= Kristin Andreassen =

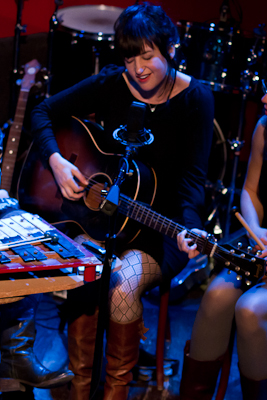

Background information
- Born: 1976 or 1977 (age 49–50)
- Origin: Portland, Oregon, US
- Genres: Old-time music, folk, indie pop
- Occupations: Singer-songwriter, dancer, square dance caller, camp director
- Instruments: Guitar, fiddle, body percussion, vocals, harmonica, keyboards, banjo, ukulele
- Years active: 1999–present
- Website: kristinandreassen.com

Kristin Andreassen (born 1976 or 1977 (age 49–50)) is an American singer-songwriter, multi-instrumentalist, dancer, old time musician and educator. Currently based in Nashville, Tennessee, she started her music career as a professional clogger with Footworks Percussive Dance Ensemble and in the early 2000s joined the folk bands Uncle Earl and Sometymes Why as a vocalist, dancer, songwriter, guitarist. She is known for using body percussion and dance in live performances.

In 2007 she released her first solo album, Kiss Me Hello, which was produced by Mark Schatz (Nickel Creek). The opening track "Crayola Doesn't Make a Color for Your Eyes" won the John Lennon Songwriting Contest in the Children's Category, also becoming a hit on children's radio despite the fact that the overall album was intended for adult listeners. Since charting on SiriusXM’s Kids' Place Live, the song has been covered by artists including Tyne Daly. Andreassen's second full-length solo album, Gondolier, was released on February 17, 2015.

With her bands, Andreassen has performed at festivals such as Bonnaroo, the Telluride Bluegrass Festival, the Greyfox Bluegrass Festival and internationally at the Port Fairy Festival in Australia and Celtic Connections in the UK. In 2008, she appeared on A Prairie Home Companion as a solo artist. She has recently toured as a harmony singer, fiddler and harmonica player with Aoife O'Donovan, Dawn Landes, Jeffrey Lewis & the Junkyard, Lucius and Jefferson Hamer. In 2011, Andreassen and Laura Cortese co-founded Miles of Music Camp, an all-ages artist retreat that operates weekend and week-long workshops in New Hampshire, Brooklyn and Boston. She appeared at the Folk Alliance International conference in Kansas City in February 2015.

== Early life and education ==
Andreassen grew up in the Portland, Oregon, suburb of Hillsboro. There she developed an early interest in dance and music. In her youth she played piano and sang in various choirs. After graduating high school, she studied history at McGill University in Montreal, Quebec, and spent time in Cape Breton studying community economic development and Cape Breton stepdance. While in school, she worked as a journalist, an Amtrak sleeping car porter, and a community development facilitator.

== Music and dance career ==
=== 1999–2006: Early years ===
Andreassen began professionally pursuing her interest in music and dance in 1999, when she was hired by Footworks Percussive Dance Ensemble in Annapolis, Maryland. Moving there, she became a principal dancer with the traditional percussive dance ensemble, and spent several years touring internationally, performing and teaching Appalachian clogging, Irish and Cape Breton stepdance, tap and other forms of traditional percussive dance. She left her full-time position in the company in 2003, though she continued to collaborate with the troupe from time to time. While working with Footworks, Andreassen recorded with friends Laura Cortese and Pierce Woodward under the name The Jolly Bankers. They released two EPs: Death & Taxes (2003), and Tax Return (2005).

In December 2003 Andreassen joined the old-time music group Uncle Earl as a guitar player, dancer and singer. She first met the founder of the group, mandolin player KC Groves at the Appalachian Stringband Music Festival (Clifftop) in West Virginia in the late 1990s. They had been friends for several years when Groves invited Andreassen to join the band officially, three years after it formed.

When she joined, the lineup featured KC Groves, Abigail Washburn and Rayna Gellert, and the group then recorded two EPs followed by two full-length albums with producers Dirk Powell and John Paul Jones of Led Zeppelin. Andreassen wrote the band's song "Pale Moon", which includes the lyric that became the title of their first Rounder Records release, She Waits For Night (2005). Her dancing feet can be heard on the Uncle Earl instrumental "Sisters of the Road," which was featured in the movie Cedar Rapids (2011).

Andreassen became a founding member of the "folk noir" singing trio Sometymes Why in 2005, when she got together with two women from other notable stringbands (Aoife O'Donovan of Crooked Still and Ruth Ungar Merenda of The Mammals) to write and record a singer-songwriter album. Their self-titled album was recorded live in May 2005 under the name Sometymes Why, and the band went on to tour the United States and Ireland, including appearances at Bonnaroo on NPR's Mountain Stage. She continued to tour with the band as she started her career as a solo artist and singer-songwriter.

=== 2006–07: Singles and Kiss Me Hello ===
Her first solo album, Kiss Me Hello, was released in early 2007 on her own Yellowcar Music label. The eclectic album featured twelve original songs with influences from old time, country, pop, and musical theater influences. Kiss Me Hello was produced by Mark Schatz, with Andreassen on guitar, vocals, and foot percussion. Schatz played bass and banjo, with guest artists such as Aoife O'Donovan, Ruth Ungar, Scott Senior, Eric Merrill, Rushad Eggleston and Oliver Steck. Most of the recording took place in Andreassen's kitchen in Annapolis, Maryland.

External videos
- Music Video for "Crayola Doesn't Make A Color For Your Eyes"
- Simmon – Kristin Andreassen with Aoife O’Donovan – Doug Fir Lounge

In 2009, Andreassen made a music video for the Kiss Me Hello song "Crayola Doesn't Make A Color For Your Eyes." Directed by Ballard C. Boyd, the video features a classroom of 2nd-graders and became popular with educators. The song went on to be covered by a number of artists, for example by Tyne Daly in her televised cabaret. Daly also performed a cover of the song at the 2009 MAC Awards. Other informal covers have been done by choirs, marching bands, and artists such as RedNo.5, Uncle Earl, Kick Up The Grass, Rather Be Giraffes, Ace's Angels, etc. Andreassen's follow-up children's music project, The Bright Siders, is a collaboration with Brooklyn-based child psychiatrist Kari Groff and features songs on mental health issues for children.

=== 2007–13: Community projects, band albums ===
Also in 2007, the same year she won in the Children's Category at the John Lennon Songwriting Contest, Andreassen was nominated in the Gospel Category for composing the Uncle Earl song "Easy in the Early." With Uncle Earl she also released the new album Waterloo, Tennessee, which a year later would win the 2008 Folk Alliance Album of the Year.

External videos
- Music Video for "Streak o' Lean, Streak o' Fat" by Uncle Earl (first filmed November 20, 2009)
- Live Video on BBC: Uncle Earl, with Andreassen on guitar and dancing

In 2007, Andreassen and filmmaker Tom Krueger created a music video for Uncle Earl featuring a Kung Fu-style clogging battle set in a Chinese restaurant. The music is the traditional fiddle tune "Streak o' Lean, Streak o' Fat," and features Washburn’s original Chinese-language lyrics and dancing by Jason Nious of Stomp, Heidi Kulas and the Bailey Mountain Cloggers, Maureen Berry and Matthew Olwell of Footworks, Emma Leahy-Good of Rhythm in Shoes, Nate Good of Cirque du Soleil, and Nic Gareiss.

Uncle Earl took a break from touring in 2010, but played a reunion show at Planet Bluegrass’ Rockygrass Festival in July 2014.

Sometymes Why's second album, Your Heart is a Glorious Machine, was released in March 2009 on Signature Sounds and was produced by José Ayerve. Among various gigs in support of the album, Sometymes Why opened two tours for the progressive bluegrass group Punch Brothers. Sometymes Why also performed as The Fates in Anaïs Mitchell's folk opera Hadestown.

Since moving to Brooklyn, New York in 2009, Andreassen began focusing on community projects as well. She co-founded a Monday night old time music session at the Lowlands Bar in 2010, hosted a series of variety shows at the now-defunct Banjo Jim's in the East Village, and taught dance and performed regularly at the Jalopy Theatre in Brooklyn. She became the co-director of Miles of Music Camp, an all-ages artist retreat she co-founded with Laura Cortese. She also joined Jeffrey Lewis & the Junkyard for two European tours and one in America in 2012–2013.

=== 2014–15: Gondolier ===
In 2014 she announced the upcoming release of her sophomore solo album Gondolier, with the full album due out on February 17, 2015. A number of the album's tracks were made available for download along with pre-orders, and the first single, "Azalea," debuted on December 4 on CMT Edge, with the publication calling it a "delicate beauty" with a "sleepy, contented feel... backed by a gentle accompaniment of woodwinds." A second song from the album, "The New Ground," premiered in December 2014 on PopMatters.

Seven of ten tracks were produced by Robin MacMillan, and three were produced by Lawson White. Recorded in Brooklyn, New York, it features a multitude of guest artists, including vocalists Aoife O'Donovan, Ruth Ungar Merenda, and Cassandra Jenkins. Guest instrumentalists include bassist Paul Kowert (Punch Brothers), woodwind player Alec Spiegelman (Cuddle Magic), cellist Rushad Eggleston (Crooked Still), bassist Tony Maimone, keyboard players Frank LoCrasto and Erik Deutsch, guitarist Jefferson Hamer, and fiddler Stephanie Coleman. For March 2015, Andreassen has announced a full band tour of New England, including Joe's Pub in New York City, and Club Passim in Cambridge, Massachusetts.

== Personal life ==
Andreassen is married to American guitarist Chris Eldridge.

== Awards and nominations ==
- 2007 John Lennon Songwriting Contest – Grand Prize (Children's Category) for "Crayola Doesn't Make A Color For Your Eyes"
- 2007 John Lennon Songwriting Contest – Finalist (Gospel Category) for "Easy in the Early"
- 2008 Folk Alliance Album of the Year – Winner for Waterloo, Tennessee by Uncle Earl
- 2009 John Lennon Songwriting Contest – Finalist (Children's Category) for "Sad is Not Forever", co-written with Kari Groff

== Discography ==
=== Solo albums ===
- 2007: Kiss Me Hello
- 2013: 'Simmon – EP
- 2015: Gondolier

=== Collaborative albums ===
With The Jolly Bankers

- 2003: Death & Taxes
- 2005: Tax Return

With Uncle Earl

- 2004: Going to the Western Slope EP
- 2004: Raise a Ruckus EP
- 2005: She Waits for Night
- 2007: Waterloo, Tennessee

With Sometymes Why

- 2005: Sometimes Why
- 2009: Your Heart is a Glorious Machine

=== Guest appearances ===
Selected albums featuring Andreassen:

- 2003: Leave No Millionaire Behind by Pierce Woodward (vocals, background vocals)
- 2005: 'Til I Know by James Leva (foot percussion, vocal harmony)
- 2006: Pine by Laura Cortese (piano, vocal harmony)
- 2011: Rose Polenzani's The Rabbit (glockenspiel, harmony vocal)
- 2012: Tumbling Bones’ Schemes EP (harmony vocals)
- 2012: Take This Song With You by Maya and the Ruins (vocal harmony)
- 2013: Departure & Farewell by Hem (choir/chorus)
- 2014: Tony Trischka's Great Big World (harmony vocals)

=== Covers ===
Incomplete list of songs written/co-written by Andreassen as covered by other artists:

- 2006: "Like the Snow" – recorded by Lissa Schneckenburger on A Different Game
- 2006: "Even the Lost Creek" (co-written with Dango Rose) – recorded by Laura Cortese on Even the Lost Creek
- 2006: "The Shiny Penny" – recorded by Flynn Cohen on Mellow Yell
- 2009: "The Red Shoes Blues" – recorded by The Sweetback Sisters on Chicken Ain't Chicken
- 2009: "Virginia is For Lovers" (co-written with Mary Lucey) – recorded by The Sweetback Sisters on Chicken Ain't Chicken
- 2010: "Send me a Letter" – recorded by Joy Kills Sorrow on Darkness Sure Becomes This City
- 2011: "Pine" (co-written with Laura Cortese) – recorded by The Poison Oaks on Pine
- 2011: "The London Devil" (co-written with Laura Cortese & Pierce Woodward) – recorded by The Poison Oaks on Pine
- 2012: "Sad is Not Forever" (co-written with Kari Groff) – recorded by The Bright Siders

=== In film and TV ===
The following is an incomplete list of songs by Andreassen or her related ensembles, as included on film and TV:

- 2009: "The Sound Asleep" from Sometymes Why’s Your Heart Is a Glorious Machine was on ABC’s Private Practice Episode 310
- 2011: "Sisters of the Road" from Uncle Earl’s Waterloo, Tennessee was featured in the film Cedar Rapids
- 2014: "Daybreak" from Simmon EP was featured in the film Angel's Perch

== See also ==
- List of singer-songwriters
