= Ben Sollee =

American musician

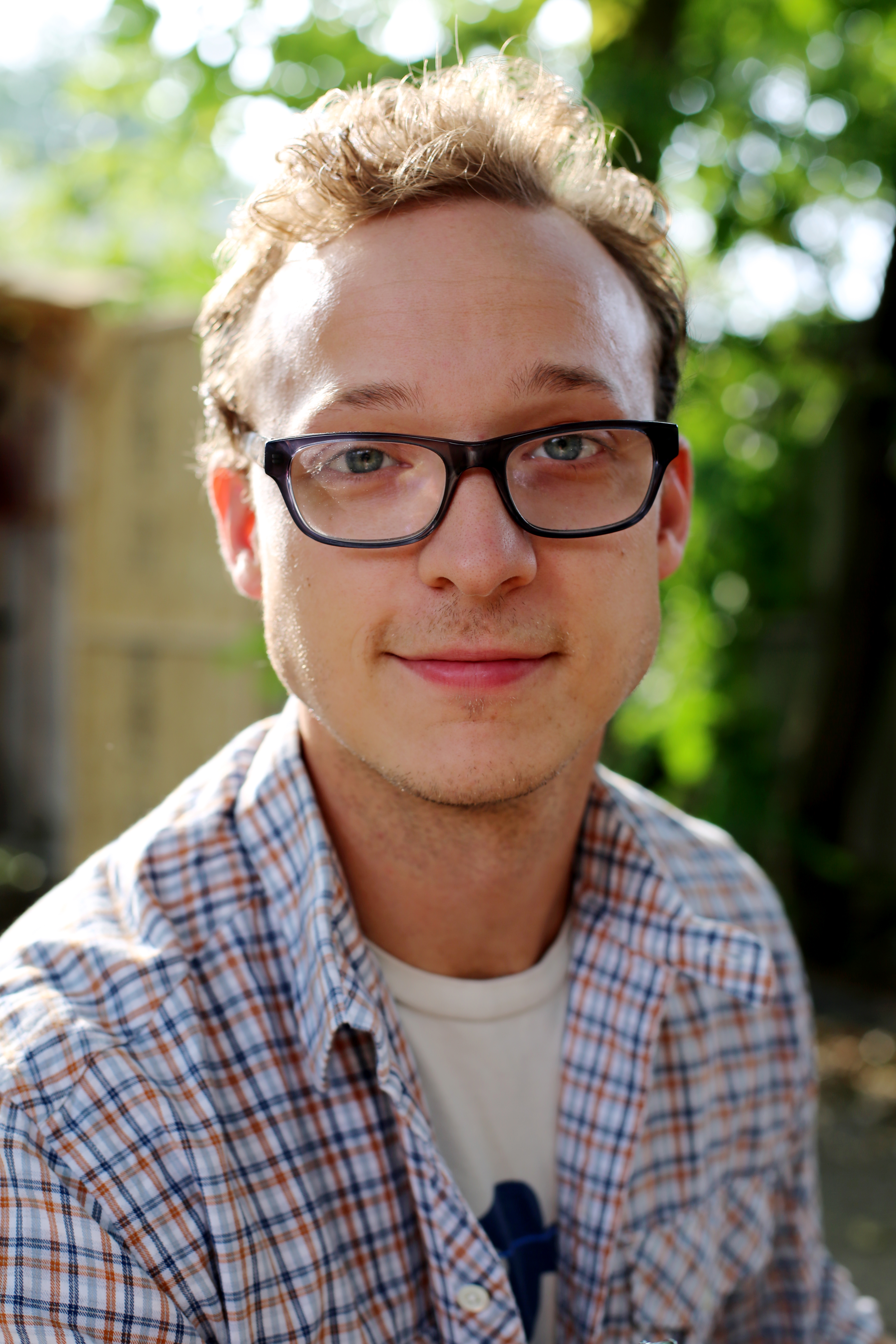
- Ben Sollee in 2014

Background information
- Origin: Lexington, Kentucky, United States
- Genres: Bluegrass; Folk; Jazz; R&B; Contemporary; Classical
- Occupations: Musician, singer, songwriter, composer
- Instrument: Cello
- Years active: 2000–present
- Labels: Tin Ear Records, Sub Pop, SonaBLAST! Records
- Member of: Sparrow Quartet
- Website: www.bensollee.com

Ben Sollee is an American cellist, singer-songwriter, and composer known for his political activism. His music incorporates banjo, guitar, and mandolin along with percussion and unusual cello techniques. His songs exhibit a mix of folk, bluegrass, jazz, and R&B elements. Sollee has also composed longer instrumental pieces for dance ensembles and for film.

== Early life and education ==
Sollee was raised in Lexington, Kentucky, and attended public schools where he was introduced to the cello in the fourth grade.

Sollee graduated from the School for Creative and Performing Arts at Lafayette High School in 2002. He was admitted to the University of Louisville's School of Music on a full-tuition scholarship to study cello.

== Musical career ==
=== Early career and Learning to Bend ===
While in college, Sollee performed and soloed in his school's classical ensembles but continued to participate in the Woodsongs programs and took part in the recording sessions of seasoned performers such as Otis Taylor and Abigail Washburn. Sollee toured off and on with Washburn as a duo from 2005 to 2008. He became a member of the Sparrow Quartet (which also included banjoist Béla Fleck and violinist Casey Driessen) when Washburn formed it in 2006, and that year the group issued an EP with five songs on the Nettwerk label. The Sparrow Quartet made a trip to perform in China in 2007 and, under auspices of the U.S. State Department, became the first American music ensemble of any kind to be permitted to enter Tibet, where it performed several shows. The group then began working on what would be its signature studio album, Abigail Washburn & The Sparrow Quartet, which was released in May 2008. That same month, Sollee came out with his first EP If You're Gonna Lead My Country The group toured widely throughout the U.S. during the period of 2006–2008. On June 30, 2008, the quartet was featured in a broadcast on PBS station KPBS in San Diego.

While Sollee had been touring commercially since his late teens with artists such as Otis Taylor and Abigail Washburn, during his senior year he began performing his first solo gigs in Louisville area, playing his own music. By this time he had already self-produced three CD albums, the last of which, Turn on the Moon, was released in March 2006. After graduating from the University of Louisville in May 2006 with a degree in cello performance, and while still touring with the Sparrow Quartet, Sollee began work on a new solo album, also self-produced, entitled Learning to Bend, which was released in an initial premium "collector's" version (1000 numbered copies) in November 2007. By December 28, 2007, on the strength of that record, NPR's Morning Edition had identified Sollee as one of the "Top Ten Unknown Artists of the Year."

A commercial version of Learning to Bend, issued on the SonaBLAST! Records label, was released in June 2008. On July 5, 2008, NPR's All Things Considered aired a feature on Sollee, describing his record as "an inspired collection of acoustic, folk, and jazz-flavored songs, filled with hope and the earnest belief that the world is good." No Depression ranked Sollee's record among its top five for 2008. Paste Magazine's September 2008 issue listed Sollee among "The Best of What's Next; Twenty-Six Emerging Artists You Must Know."

Sollee was featured on the PBS series On Canvas, broadcast by Philadelphia station WHYY on October 8, 2008, which was recorded before a performance at the First Unitarian Church of Philadelphia. On December 20, 2008, Public Radio International's "The World" program, co-produced by the BBC World Service and WBGH Boston, declared Learning to Bend one of the nine best "Global Hits" of 2008. The top nine contained only three artists from the U.S.

==== Kanye West episode ====
The 2008 Bonnaroo Music and Arts Festival was marked by controversy surrounding a performance by Kanye West. West's set was scheduled for 2:45 a.m. on June 8, the last night of the festival. The previous act had left the stage late and the time taken to remove its staging and install West's elaborate set, including a pyro and light show, delayed the show's start until 4:25 a.m. Audience members grew impatient and rebellious and some left before the show finally began. Spectators threw detritus onto the stage. The production and choreography of the show was compromised, West was outraged, and many in the audience became hostile. The resulting debacle resonated for days afterward, fanned by an angry Kanye West on his blog site.

Sollee also had performed in the 2008 Festival, as a member of the Sparrow Quartet, and so was a witness to the Kanye West episode. The next day Sollee wrote a song about it titled "Dear Kanye," framed as an "open letter" to West, which he recorded on his laptop. It was done on a whim, he later stated, for circulation among his management team. "For better or worse, they passed it along to blogs and radio" he said, and the result was "wildfire" and unexpected and unwanted attention on the national level. The song, circulated widely, acknowledged West as a major and influential artist in the rap genre and chided him for his infantile and unbecoming behavior and commercialism. Sollee withdrew the song after one local performance. He posted a statement on his website

=== Touring 2008–2010 and Dear Companion ===
Sollee toured throughout 2008 as part of the Sparrow Quartet and on his own. On September 27, the group performed a set at the Austin City Limits Music Festival. On February 8, 2009, the Sparrow Quartet performed its final show, before going into a hiatus, at Sollee's Alma Mater, the University of Louisville, where it played for a capacity crowd in Comstock Hall. Thereafter Sollee concentrated on his solo career. On February 24, 2009, he made his national television debut in a performance on ABC's Jimmy Kimmel Live program. On March 18–19, 2009 he performed for the first time as a solo artist in the SXSW Festival in Austin, Texas.

In March 2009, Sollee began touring with the Vienna Teng Trio, led by pianist/singer-songwriter Vienna Teng, and The Paper Raincoat, a band from Brooklyn, New York. On May 8, 2009, Sollee played to a sold-out house at the Bomhard Theater in the Kentucky Center for the Arts in Louisville. In September 2009, he performed as a solo artist in the Austin City Limits Festival, and on October 22 he made a first appearance as a solo artist on NPR's Mountain Stage in West Virginia. In November 2009, he toured with Cincinnati singer-songwriter Kim Taylor. Taylor and Sollee had done occasional shows together since 2007, but this tour found them playing both solo material and accompanying one another during each other's sets.

In August 2008, Sollee's song "How to See the Sun Rise" was featured in the season 4 episode "I Am the Table" of the Showtime television series Weeds. During this period Sollee worked on a new recording project with two other Kentucky musicians, Daniel Martin Moore, from Cold Spring, and Louisville's Jim James of My Morning Jacket and Monsters of Folk. The album, titled Dear Companion, was produced by James and featured Sollee and Moore singing original songs (with James providing vocal support on some). The record explored the three artists' ties to Appalachia and drew attention to the problem of mountaintop removal coal mining and its impact on the people and heritage of the central Appalachian region. The album came out on February 16, 2010, on the Sub Pop label and debuted nationally at number 6 on iTunes. In April 2010, at the invitation of the U.S. Embassy in Stockholm, Sweden, Sollee made a presentation on bike touring to the first TEDx Conference sponsored by the U.S. Embassy in that country.

=== Bike tours ===
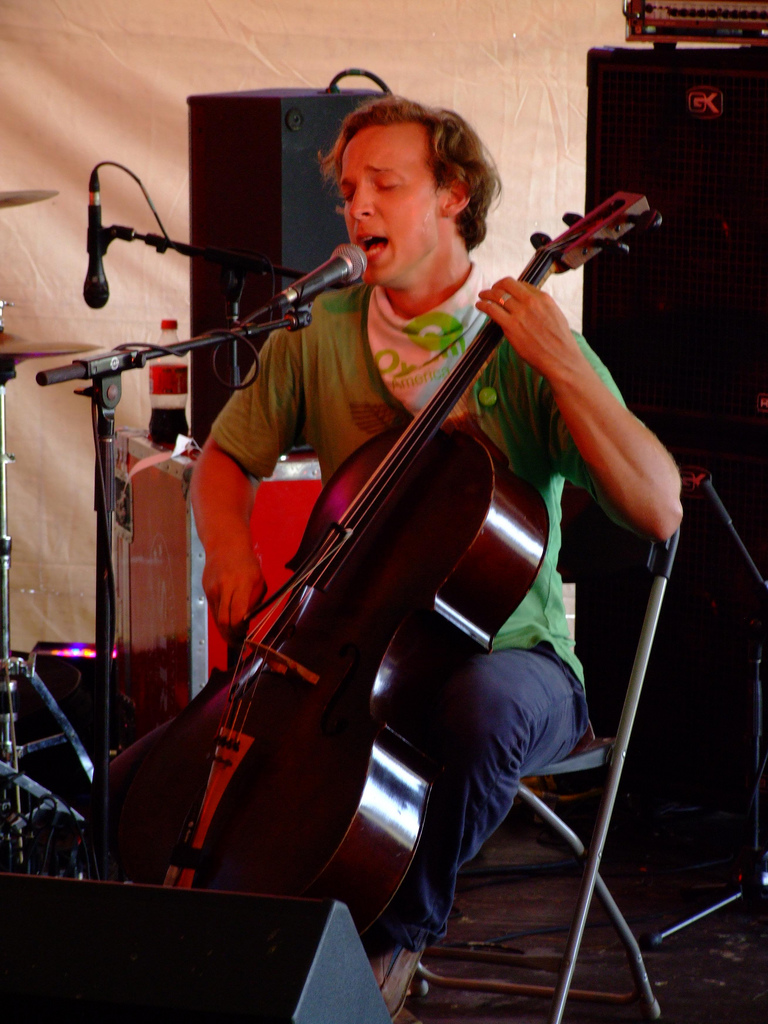
Ben Sollee performing at the Bonnaroo Music Festival in 2009

During the spring of 2009, Sollee established a tie with Oxfam America with the intent of promoting the relief and development program of this internationally affiliated organization in conjunction with his own touring and concertizing. In June 2009 Sollee embarked on an inaugural bicycle tour from Lexington, Kentucky to Manchester, Tennessee, to perform at the Bonnaroo Festival. Hauling instruments, merchandise, and baggage on their bikes or on trailers pulled behind, he and his percussionist, videographer, and tour manager traveled the 330 mile distance over a period of eight days, stopping to perform before small audiences in the communities along the way. Short narrative video summaries were made each day and posted on the internet. In the first of these videos, Sollee admitted that he was not an experienced bike rider, his longest previous riding experience being "maybe eight miles." On July 12, 2009, Kentucky Educational Television broadcast a feature on Sollee and his bike ride to Bonnaroo on its program One to One, hosted by Bill Goodman.

On August 18, 2010, with his previous bicycling companions, Sollee began his most ambitious bicycle tour to date. The "Ditch the Van" tour began its west coast leg in San Diego. Performing almost nightly as they threaded their way up the west coast, they played their final show in San Francisco on August 28. They then loaded everything aboard a train for Colorado, where they continued riding, playing shows in Fort Collins and the Denver area before again boarding a train for Baltimore. They performed in the Baltimore area before riding to Havre de Grace, where they did two nights of fundraising appearances at the Biller's Bikes cooperative. From there it was on to Philadelphia, Doylestown, Bethlehem, Kempton, York, Frederick, Bethesda, and Washington, D.C. They subsequently returned to Kentucky by train and finished the bike tour via performances at Berea, Richmond, and, finally, Frankfort, where on October 8 they sold out the Grand Theatre. Once again videos were made along the way and twelve of them were posted on the internet alongside a running commentary by Sollee. The July–August issue of American Bicyclist Magazine cover photo was of Sollee and his biking companions and contained an article on his tours by bike. Sollee, responding to widespread speculation that the bicycle tours were driven by the motive of being "green," explained during his appearances and in the media that his purpose was to slow down the travel in order to better connect with the communities he was visiting and the people he performed for.

On October 27, 2011, Sollee and his three companions began a ditch-the-van tour with a performance at the Preservation Hall in New Orleans, Louisiana. The tour was to wind along the southern coast to Orlando, Florida, with concert stops along the way. Glide Magazine noted Sollee's goal to "gain a deeper connection to his fans... slow things down, meet new people and take in the local scenery and culture that most travelers bypass completely." On the fifth day on the road, he aborted the effort, saying he wished touring by bicycle "to be reviving, not death defying... Regrettably, due to a lack of transportation infrastructure and the unsafe driving habits of many Gulf Coast drivers, I have to cancel the remaining portion of this tour." All of the remaining appearances except the final one on November 13, as part of the Orlando Calling Fest, were cancelled. Another bike tour followed Sollee's appearance on July 28, 2012, at the Newport Folk Festival through New England 230 miles to a final show in Portland, Maine, on August 5.

=== Inclusions and the Live at the Grocery on Home album ===
During the latter half of 2010, Sollee worked on an album entitled Inclusions, produced by Duane Lundy. By this time Sollee was working consistently with the percussionist Jordon Ellis, whom he had known since his high school days. The two musicians established a tight musical relationship that became highly facilitative to Sollee's musical expression. Inclusions set a new standard for Sollee's music, with more percussive elements and some prominent parts for wind instruments. Released in May 2011, the record was generally well received by critics but startled many listeners. It contained a dramatic but dissonant opening fanfare "inspired by a field recording from Basque Country, Spain", arranged for woodwinds and percussion and performed by Jacob Duncan and Jordon Ellis. There were other astringent moments through the album that made it challenging for listeners looking for an unmitigatedly "sweet" sound. Jim Fusilli of The Wall Street Journal interviewed Sollee and opined that the record "really broadens [Sollee's] musical palate and introduces us to new sounds," and "that there is a kind of warmth to the arrangement, a kind of burnished quality to it that's richer than the arrangements on [Sollee's] earlier album." Fusilli described it as "delightful, interesting, a thoughtful piece of work, very moving as well." A song from Inclusions, "Embrace," was featured in Season 3, Episode 6 of the TV show Parenthood on NBC.

In June 2011, Sollee performed again at the Bonnaroo Music Festival in Manchester, Tennessee, both as an individual artist and with My Morning Jacket. Among the 170 acts that were booked for the festival, The Wall Street Journal placed Sollee among the "ten acts you won't want to miss. On 11 July 2011, Sollee did a "Tiny Desk" concert for NPR, accompanied by violinist Phoebe Hunt and percussionist Jordon Ellis, with whom he was then touring.

In early December 2011, Sollee spent a four-night residency at The Grocery on Home, an art house in Atlanta, Georgia, where he performed with his percussionist, Jordon Ellis, and his former colleague from the Sparrow Quartet, violinist Casey Driessen. The recordings of these evenings were the basis of a new album titled Live at The Grocery on Home, which was issued on May 1, 2012. In a novel marketing arrangement, the albums were sold through the nine-store Heine Bros. coffee house chain in Louisville where the release party had been held, and online.

=== Half-Made Man and other activities, 2012–2013 ===
Sollee began working on a new self-produced album, to be titled Half-Made Man, in January 2012. For the first time in such a project, Sollee sought direct financial help by appealing to his fans through an online campaign via the website, PledgeMusic. He set a goal of raising $18,000 over a 120-day period to cover the substantial production and marketing costs anticipated for the project. The effort was immediately successful, bringing in pledges of more than $21,000 in the first 72 hours. The approach used on this project was to produce a "band" style record, i.e., one that was based mostly an actual ensemble performance. Supporting musicians included Carl Broemel (guitars), Jeremy Kittel (violin, viola), Alana Rockland (bass), and Jordon Ellis (percussion). The album was released on September 25, 2012. Stephen Thompson at NPR said of Half-Made Man that it "positively soars, with cellos used to feed the drama and fuel Sollee's ruminations in the pursuit of meaning in modern life."

During the period March 3–23, 2012, Sollee conducted his first solo tour of Australia, which included individual shows as well as performances in the Port Fairy Folk Festival (Victoria, March 10–12), the Brunswick Music Festival (Brunswick, March 16), the Mossvale Music Festival (Victoria, March 17), and the Blue Mountains Music Festival (Katoomba, March 18).

On May 7, in one of his many collaborations, Sollee performed as a guest of the Portland Cello Project in a show at Centre College in Danville, Kentucky. In June he served on the faculty at the 2012 Mark O'Connor Summer String Program in Boston. On July 15 Sollee played a set in the Forecastle Festival in Louisville. Later in July he performed in the Newport Folk Festival, at which Paste Magazine ranked Sollee among its ten "great non-headlining acts" to see. Sollee toured during much of the fall. In early December he made a presentation on touring by bicycle at the 2012 TEDx Conference in San Diego.

Sollee was the subject of a 23-minute documentary film entitled Wooden Box produced by California filmmaker Kyia Clayton that was introduced at the Macon Film Festival in Georgia, February 14–17, 2013. The film's title was based on Sollee's frequent reference to his cello as just "a wooden box with strings" and focussed on his attempts to inspire young people's interest in music through his workshops in both public and private schools. On March 26, Sollee was again the featured guest on NPR's World Cafe, and in April he toured with Over the Rhine. During the spring of 2013, he conducted workshops in schools around the Midwest. Sollee was the featured performer in the finale of the Lincoln Center's American Songbook series at the Stanley H. Kaplan Penthouse on April 20, 2013. The New York Times' review by Stephen Holden praised Sollee's work, summing up that, "Joy peeked through the music like rays of sunshine in the Kentucky woods."

=== 2014 and The Paul Simon Tribute Concert ===
On March 31, 2014, Sollee was invited to participate in a Paul Simon tribute concert "The Music of Paul Simon" at Carnegie Hall in New York City. Promoter Michael Dorff had heard Sollee's performance of "Obvious Child" (on his album The Hollow Sessions) and invited Sollee to join the bill for the show. During an interview with Paste, Sollee stated: "I think I like the fact that [Simon] went and grabbed sounds from a lot of different places, based solely on nothing more than a love for those sounds...[and]...That's the thing that inspires me most about him is he's always telling a story." Sollee performed Simon's "Wartime Prayers" at the tribute and The New York Times writer Jon Pareles described it as "a solo for voice and cello that captured its hope and mourning".

On April 28 Sollee was invited to be the keynote speaker for the earth-day celebration put on by the Bluegrass Youth Sustainability Council held at Transylvania University in Lexington. Sollee Spoke about sustainability and about how many resources he uses while touring and what he does to reduce his use of natural resources as well as performed songs with his cello to the students of his alma maters Yates Elementary, Windburn Middle School, and Lafayette High School.

=== 2015 and "The Fall Migration" tour ===
In January, Sollee was invited to compose an original score for Naomi Iizuka's At the Vanishing Point, a play about Butchertown, one of Louisville's oldest neighborhoods located east of downtown. The play originally premiered in 2004 at the Humana Festival at Actors Theatre of Louisville and was revisited in 2015 with local collaborations. Sollee played himself in the production as well as provided the soundtrack throughout the show.

In the fall of 2015, Sollee and Jordon Ellis embarked on a U.S. tour with Austin, Texas-based band Mother Falcon, naming the tour "The Fall Migration". The two bands toured extensively throughout the fall of 2015 supporting each other and collaborating on stage. "The Fall Migration" tour lasted approximately 26 dates between the months of October and December. During the tour, the two groups collaborated and recorded a song by Daft Punk titled "Lose Yourself to Dance".

In July, Sollee performed at the Calgary Folk Music Festival in Calgary, Canada. After playing his set, Sollee stayed on stage for a World Music Workshop titled "War on Error". Sollee was joined on stage by Davide Salvado, Söndörgö and The Stray Birds as they discussed how some of their failures have become learning experiences and successes. The groups also performed various tunes together that displayed a wide range of musical styles and instrumentation.

From March 27 through April 12, Sollee was named the music director of a play directed by Pirronne Yousefzadeh titled "That High Lonesome Sound" which displays the rich history of Kentucky and its bluegrass music. The play was written by Jeff Augustin, Diana Grisanti, Cory Hinkle, and Charise Castro Smith and was performed by the Actors Theatre Apprentice Company. Annette Skaggs, a writer from arts-louisville.com gave a positive review of the play saying "The collaboration that the Acting Apprentice Company had with Ben Sollee was certainly evident in capturing the spirit of the deep-rooted musical heritage of Kentucky."

=== Infowars release and other 2016 activities ===
On October 21, 2016, Sollee released his fifth studio album, Infowars on Tin Ear Records. The record is a result of the time both Ellis and Sollee have spent together collaborating and touring over the years. The two spent the first part of 2016 writing and recording using a variety of techniques to create the "live" sound one would here at a concert as well as using electronic instruments and live field recordings. On the record, Sollee gives artist credit to his longtime friend and collaborator Jordon Ellis.

In late fall, Sollee and Ellis toured the U.S. in support of Infowars opening for the band Elephant Revival, and for the majority of the tour opening up for The Wood Brothers. While touring with The Wood Brothers, the two groups often collaborated and performed together on stage and in January 2017 released a video of the two groups performing a song titled "Little Liza Jane" at the Ogden Theatre in Denver, CO

In March, Sollee released part two of his Steeples series. Steeples Part two consists of three songs, just as part one and demonstrates the skill set of storytelling and musicianship of Sollee.

On March 22, Actors Theatre of Louisville announced the reception of a forty-thousand-dollar exploratory grant from the Doris Duke Foundation to use in collaboration with Sollee. The grant is set to find and explore new ways to use technology and social media to interact with audiences and to build a demand for performing arts.

On April 21 Sollee was a featured performer at the 2015 WEDAY Kentucky celebration. WEDAY is a youth organization program that inspires kids across the city to tap into their creativity and learn and promote sustainability to their lives and city. WEDAY is a program that was formulated in Seattle, WA and has since expanded its program to Kentucky, WEDAY Kentucky.

In May 2016 Sollee recorded Stephen Foster's "My Old Kentucky Home" live in Kentucky's Woodford Reserve Distillery in honor of the annual Kentucky Derby Festival. The video was recorded inside the barrel house of the distillery and was released on the Woodford Reserve website and Facebook page accumulating over 191,000 views.

On May 2, Sollee received the Smoky Mountain Music Award from the Scruffy City Film Festival for his various works on film scores.

On June 2, Sollee stopped by the Chicago-based Audiotree Live studios to perform an intimate set of seven songs including songs from Infowars (the latest release at the time) and songs from previous releases.

In 2016, Sollee was asked to provide sounds/music for an interactive water monitoring system that doubles as an art installation by Kiersten Nash and a soundscape at Jacobson Park in Lexington. This installation is the first of its kind in Kentucky and has been tremendously successful since its debut. The water monitoring pipes protrude form the ground in various areas of the park and translate data from the water source into the sounds of which Sollee has created. The data comes from the waters conductivity, temperature and flow. The Idea behind the project is to bring awareness of the importance water in Kentucky, where it comes from, its susceptibility to contamination, the need to protect it, and over all environmental literacy. The project was commissioned by LexArts and LFUCG's Department of Environmental Quality and Public Works, and funded in-part by a $40,000 National Endowment for the Arts ART WORKS grant. The Kentucky Geological Survey was also a partner in the project.

In March 2016 in collaboration with Stage One Family Theatre in Louisville, Sollee was asked to participate in the creation and technological infused performance of Crockett Johnson's 1955 classic book Harold and the Purple Crayon. Sollee wrote an original score for the piece and performed it live for 30 performances for schools and four public performances.

== Film and dance works ==
On April 13–14, 2012, the Louisville Ballet gave the world premier of a ballet choreographed by Mikelle Bruzina for which Solllee had written the music, entitled sansei. The theme of the ballet, subtitled "Third Generation," was "Celebrating the endurance of family." Sollee's music took the form of a three-movement work for quintet (violin, cello, bass, clarinet, and percussion) and was performed by him and a small ensemble from the pit. (this was actually the second work Sollee had created for the Louisville Ballet). On April 26–28, Sollee performed a much larger piece (51 minutes) commissioned by the North Carolina Dance Theater for Choreography by Sasha Janes in a dance adaptation of the complex drama Dangerous Liaisons. A unique feature of this production had Sollee playing his amplified cello while riding a moving platform suspended by cables and hovering above the action. The reviewer for the Charlotte Observer, Steven Brown, described Sollee's music for the tangled drama "by turns melancholy, raucous, and ethereal."

During the spring of 2013, Sollee produced and performed a film score for the Maidentrip, an 82-minute documentary by filmmaker Jillian Schlesinger about Laura Dekker the youngest person at 14, to successfully sail around the world solo. The film debut debuted at the 2013 SXSW film festival. Sollee performed lead cello solos in the musical score for the 2013 film Killing Season starring Robert De Niro and John Travolta, and composed and performed an original song to be heard during the credits of the film. He is set to score Robin Wright's directorial debut Land.

== Musical styles and innovations ==
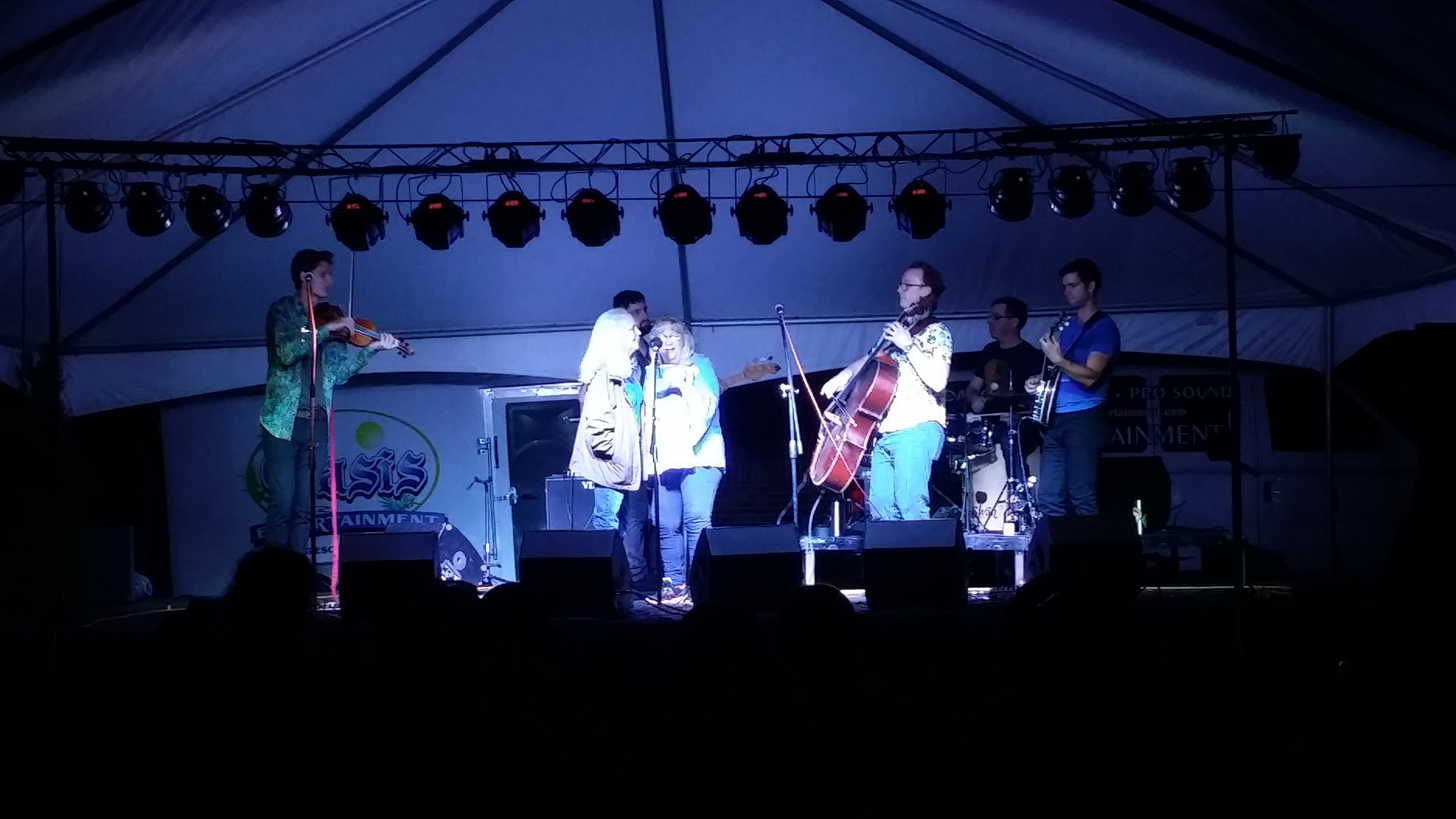
Ben Sollee performing with his mother and aunt at a concert in Corbin, KY in 2017

Characterizing Sollee's music with any precision is a challenge, since it fuses elements from a wide variety of sources. In describing his music, Sollee told Jim Fusilli of The Wall Street Journal that, "Phrasing-wise, [it's a] free story-telling style of singing where its about moving the story line along. [My influences have been] Paul Simon, Nina Simone, Ani DiFranco, Louis Armstrong, Lauryn Hill, Sam Cooke, Phoebe Snow."

Sollee's cello work is the element that seems to most impact audiences that have not previously seen him perform. The initial reaction is often one of surprise, if not shock, since most listeners' familiarity with the cello, if any, is in formal classical settings, primarily as a part of an orchestra. Sollee shows up in a T-shirt instead of a tux. He plucks the cello's strings as frequently as he bows them, plays without printed music, and rarely concentrates his gaze on the instrument while performing. Mostly, he is singing, coordinating with his fellow performers, and connecting with the audience, in much the manner that many guitar players do. In Response to a probe about the uniqueness of what he is doing as a musician, Sollee has said he's "just continued with stuff thats been going on in banjo, guitar, mandolin, fiddle, and bass" In explaining his bond to the cello, Sollee told CNN interviewer that the cello is "a great Swiss Army Knife...It always does the different things I need it to do in ensembles. I can take the lead. I can play rhythm. It always creates a sound that works in the environment I'm playing in."

Sollee is a very animated cello player, so much so that it does not seem to register, for the most part that he's actually stuck in a seated position in a single spot. The playing is sometimes so energetic, even aggressive that colleagues such as Jim James have expressed surprise that the instrument is still in one piece at the end of the show. [JIM 01] Ali Marshall, reviewing a Sollee show at the Orange Peel for Mountain Xpress in Asheville, NC, said: "To describe what Sollee does in a few words is tricky....As soon as Sollee opened his set, the energy level in the room increased a hundred fold....He doesn't so much play the cello as concur sound from it. He hammers it, beats it, strokes it, strums it like a harp, slaps it like a bass. He seems to breathe with it and through it, pulling its notes from a source deep within his own creative well."

Sollee began to experiment with sampling after spending some time with DJs. Sollee worked intensively during 2010 with D. L. Jones (Detroit) and DJ 2nd Nature (Atlanta), as he was ramping to do his Inclusions album, and told Wall Street Journal music critic Jim Fusilli that he had learned much about the DJ techniques using existing materials and layering sound to create something new, but that he realized that it was hard to make a performance out of such a procedure, that "as a classical musician, I'm trained to make things from scratch... I'm coming from a world where performance is everything and the hand of the player in the sound is very important."

From very early on in his career, Sollee has shown a penchant for collaboration with other artists, musical and otherwise. In 2007 he worked with dancer and choreographer David Ingram by performing live musical accompaniment for ballets produced by Empujon, an independent dance collective. Sollee and Ingram have continued to collaborate on various projects, particularly dance videos using Sollee's music, e.g., "It's Not Impossible," "Bible Belt," and "Embrace." Sollee has established a reputation for performing widely with other artists. A notable example was at the 2012 Newport Folk Festival where, in addition to his own set, he sat in with four other acts—Trampled by Turtles, Apache Relay, The Head and the Heart, and My Morning Jacket. One Blogger described Sollee as "Definitely easy to spot in a concert setting. In fact, Sollee was considered by many to be [the festival's] MVP."

== Political activism ==
Sollee's music frequently touches on social issues including poverty and environmental issues. As a person from Kentucky he is especially passionate about the issue of mountain top removal in coal mining. This is one of the themes of his collaboration album Dear Companion. He frequently plays benefit concerts for the organizations Kentuckians for the Commonwealth and Oxfam America, and has made several tours of Kentucky on his bicycle, stopping in smaller towns between his headlining performances. Of specific note is the tour in the summer of 2009 which was put on in conjunction with Oxfam America, in which he traveled 330 miles to the Bonnaroo festival with his supplies and cello strapped to his bicycle. He uses a special long-frame bicycle made by Xtracycle which weighs about 60 lbs when fully packed.

== Discography ==
- If You're Gonna Lead My Country EP (2008)
- Something Worth Keeping EP (2008)
- Learning to Bend (sonaBLAST! Records, 2008)
- Dear Companion (with Daniel Martin Moore) (2010)
- Inclusions (2011)
- Live at The Grocery On Home (sonaBLAST! Records, 2012)
- Half-Made Man (2012)
- The Hollow Sessions (2013)
- Steeples Part One (2015)
- Steeples Part Two (2016)
- Kentucky Spring (2016)
- Infowars (with Jordon Ellis) (2016)
- Ben Sollee and Kentucky Native (2017)
