= City of Refuge (Abigail Washburn album) =

Studio album by Abigail Washburn
- Released: January 4, 2011
- Genres: Folk; Americana; bluegrass; singer-songwriter
- Length: 40:40
- Label: Rounder Records
- Producer: Tucker Martine

Abigail Washburn chronology
Abigail Washburn & the Sparrow Quartet (2008)	City of Refuge (2011)	Béla Fleck & Abigail Washburn (2014)

Professional ratings
Aggregate scores
Source	Rating
Metacritic	82/100
Review scores
Source	Rating
AllMusic	4.5/5 stars
American Songwriter	4/5 stars
The Austin Chronicle	4/5 stars
Entertainment Weekly	B+
Los Angeles Times	3/4 stars
Mojo	4/5 stars
musicOMH	3.5/5 stars
Paste	8.7/10
PopMatters	9/10
The Sydney Morning Herald	4/5 stars

City of Refuge is the third album by singer, songwriter, and banjoist Abigail Washburn. Produced and mixed by Tucker Martine, City of Refuge boasts an extensive list of collaborators, players, and singers, including Bill Frisell, Jeremy Kittel, Viktor Krauss, guzheng master Wu Fei, and Kai Welch. It was engineered by Kevin Dailey

== Track listing ==
No.	Title	Writer(s)	Length
1.	"Prelude"	Traditional	0:52
2.	"City of Refuge"	James Wallace; Abigail Washburn	3:42
3.	"Bring Me My Queen"	Kai Welch; Washburn	4:14
4.	"Chains"	Tommy Hans; Welch	3:51
5.	"Ballad of Treason"	Welch; Washburn	3:07
6.	"Last Train"	Welch; Washburn	3:55
7.	"Burn Thru"	Welch; Washburn	4:26
8.	"Corner Girl"	Abigail Washburn	3:24
9.	"Dreams of Nectar"	Welch; Washburn	5:51
10.	"Divine Bell"	Ketch Secor; Washburn	2:38
11.	"Bright Morning Stars"	Traditional	4:40
Total length:			40:40
