= Abigail Washburn =

American musician (born 1977)

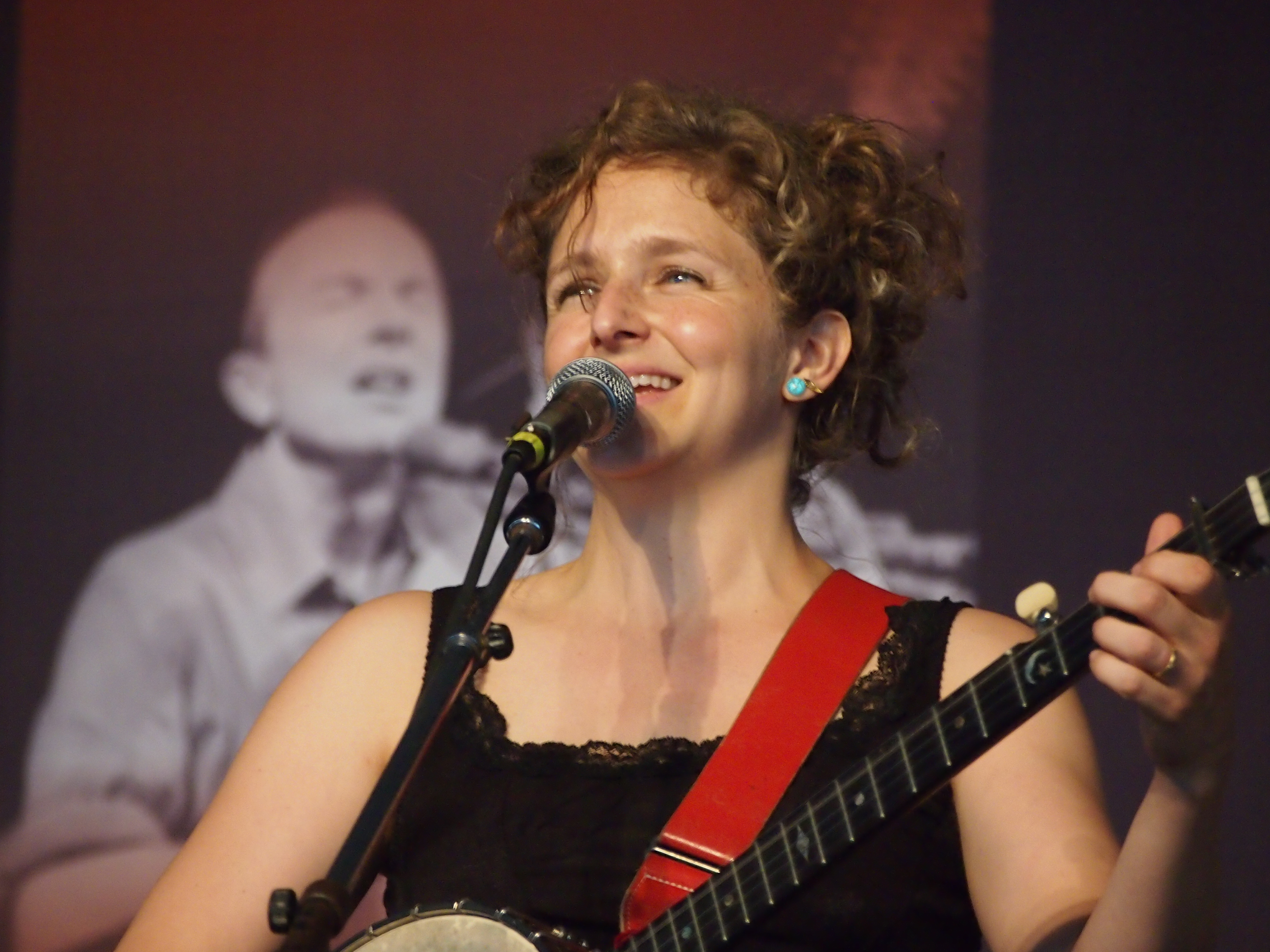
- Washburn at the Smithsonian Folk Festival, 2014

Background information
- Born: November 10, 1977 (age 48); Evanston, Illinois, U.S.
- Genres: Americana; old-time
- Instruments: Vocals, Clawhammer Banjo
- Labels: Nettwerk, Rounder Records
- Member of: The Sparrow Quartet
- Formerly of: Uncle Earl
- Website: www.abigailwashburn.com

Abigail Washburn (born November 10, 1977) is an American clawhammer banjo player and singer. She performs and records as a soloist, as well as with the old-time bands Uncle Earl and Sparrow Quartet, the experimental group The Wu Force, and as a duo with her husband Béla Fleck.

== Early life ==
Washburn was born in Evanston, Illinois, and spent her elementary and part of her junior high school years in a suburb of Washington, D.C. She attended high school in Minnesota, then attended Colorado College, where she was the school's first East Asian studies major. She learned Mandarin during the summers in intensive programs at Middlebury College, Vermont. Following this, she spent some time living in China, where she had dreams of being a lawyer (having first visited that country in 1996). After living in Vermont for three years, Washburn traveled down south before a planned trip to China to become a lawyer. She stopped at the Barre Center for Buddhist Studies and spent five days meditating. After what became a life-changing experience, Washburn left the Center ready to pursue her musical career and was quickly offered a record deal in Nashville, Tennessee.

== Uncle Earl ==
In Tennessee, she met KC Groves, one of the founding members of the band Uncle Earl, and she went on to spend five years touring with the band. The "all G'earl" group has released two records on the Rounder Records record label, She Waits for the Night (2005) and Waterloo, TN (2007), which was produced by John Paul Jones of Led Zeppelin.

== Song of the Traveling Daughter ==
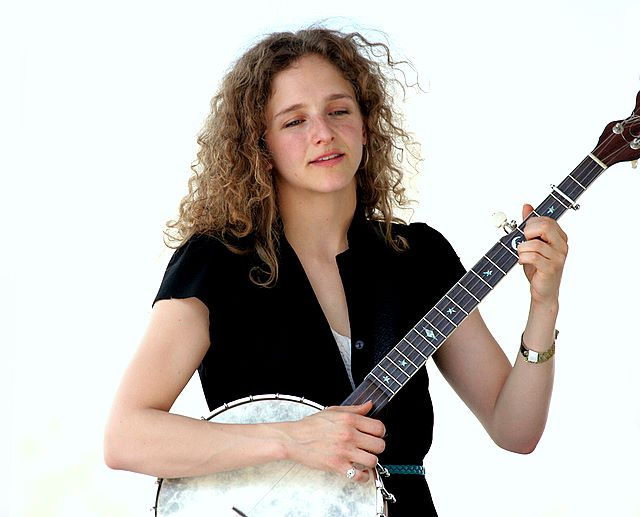
Abby Washburn at Merlefest 2007

Washburn entered the Chris Austin Songwriting Contest at the 2004 MerleFest (a bluegrass music festival in North Carolina), winning second place for her song "Rockabye Dixie", and gaining the attention of the Nettwerk record label.

Her first solo album, Song of the Traveling Daughter, was produced by Béla Fleck and features Ben Sollee, a cellist, and Jordan McConnell, guitarist for the Canadian traditional and soul music fusion band The Duhks.

== Sparrow Quartet ==
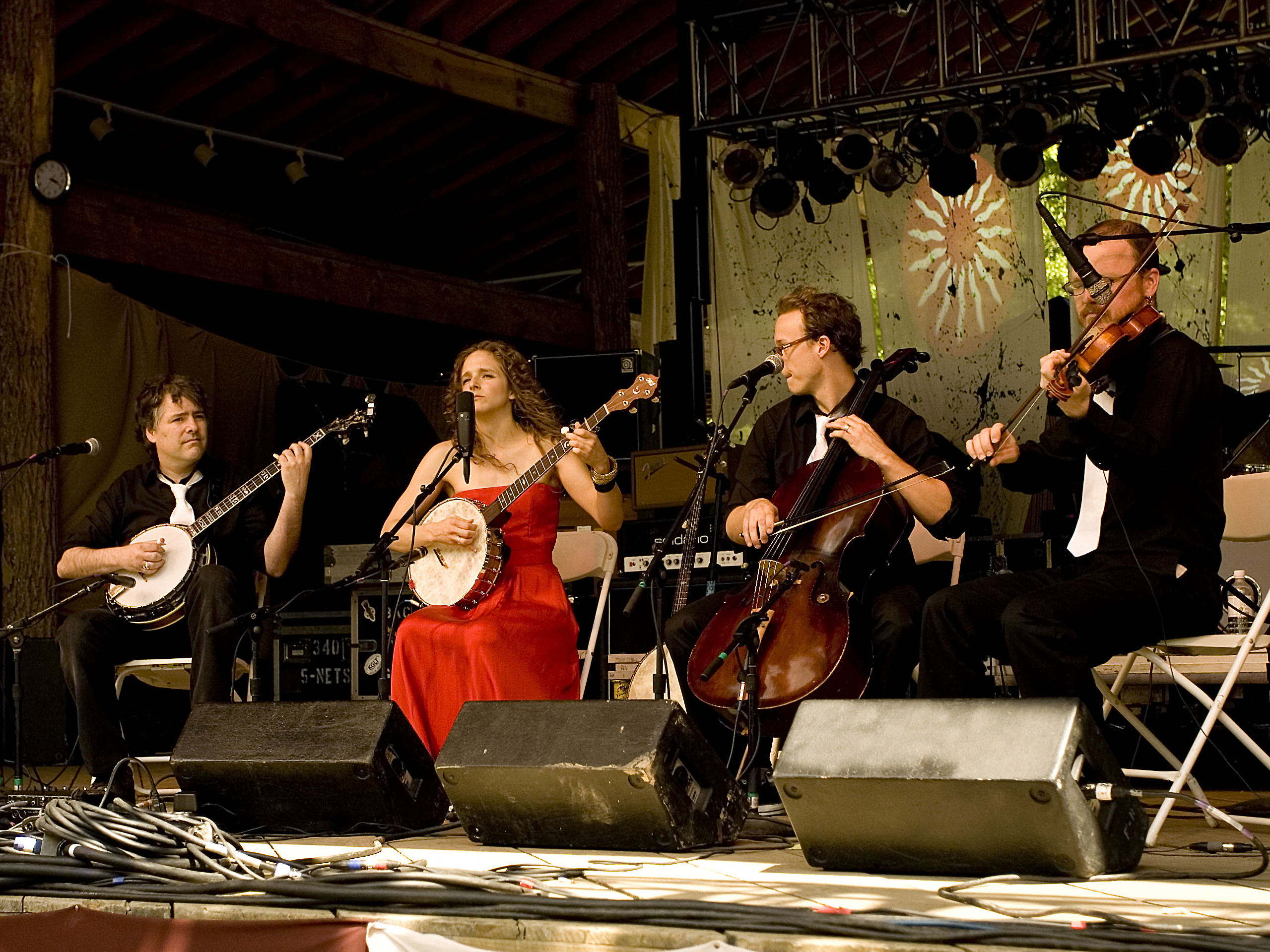
Sparrow Quartet in Asheville, North Carolina, 2008

In 2005, Washburn returned to China with a group called the Sparrow Quartet, composed of Sollee, Fleck and Grammy Award nominated fiddler Casey Driessen. The group then recorded an EP, Abigail Washburn The Sparrow Quartet. Two songs on the album were recorded in the Mandarin Chinese language, which she learned while living in China.

At the request of the U.S. government, the Sparrow Quartet toured Tibet in 2006—something no other American band had done—and performed in Beijing during the 2008 Olympics. Also in 2008, Washburn was a teacher of American folk music in Sichuan University for six weeks, "where they promptly told me that I wasn't teaching folk music correctly, because, surely there would be a correct way to do hand gestures for every song." Also that year, Washburn and the Sparrow Quartet recorded a full-length album, Abigail Washburn and the Sparrow Quartet. It was produced by Béla Fleck and composed and arranged by the foursome.

After the release of the album, Washburn and the Sparrow Quartet turned their attention to touring North America, with appearances at festivals including New Orleans Jazz & Heritage, MerleFest, Bonnaroo Music Festival, Vancouver Folk Festival and others. They returned to China for performances during the 2008 Summer Olympics in Beijing. The quartet was later featured on National Geographic Live and, in 2009, each participated in the Clearwater Concert, a benefit concert in honor of Pete Seeger's 90th birthday that featured many of the world's most well-known musicians.

== Afterquake ==
Inspired by a 2008 volunteer experience for Sichuan Quake Relief in China, Washburn joined forces with Shanghai Restoration Project's Dave Liang in March 2009 to create a musical project called Afterquake. The benefit EP a portion of each sale to benefit Sichuan Quake Relief was released on May 12, 2009, the first anniversary of the 2008 Sichuan earthquake. Over the course of two weeks, Washburn and Liang recorded and produced the entire project, which features electronic mixes of student voices and sounds from the disaster zone.

== City of Refuge ==
In early 2010, Washburn began recording her second solo album with producer Tucker Martine and collaborator Kai Welch.

Washburn embarked upon "The Silk Road Tour" with her band "The Village" from Hohhot to Ürümqi, stopping to perform and collaborate all along the way with only the goal of building bridges and dissolving difference by communing in good music. Supported by the US Embassy and the Chinese International Center for Exchange, they performed extensively at schools, universities & theaters, and spontaneously on city walls and in town squares all across China's "Wild West". They also collaborated with local musicians all along the route including Han Chinese, Mongolian, Tibetan, Hui and Uyghur musicians. The journey was chronicled in a series of videos available to view on YouTube.

In September 2012, she was featured in a campaign called "30 Songs / 30 Days" to support Half the Sky: Turning Oppression into Opportunity for Women Worldwide, a multi-platform media project inspired by Nicholas Kristof and Sheryl WuDunn's book.

== Post-American Girl ==
During the spring of 2013, Washburn debuted her first theatrical production Post-American Girl, at Joe's Pub at The Public Theater March 28–30 as part of New York Voices, the venue's popular commission series designed to help musicians make the leap from songwriting and performance to theatrical production. Washburn's new stage piece was about an American girl coming-of-age in a swiftly changing global order. It featured folk arts of China and Appalachia in shadow puppetry, sacred harp song, traditional music as well as new compositions. The production included Chinese Theatre Works' Kuang Yu Fong (founder and Master Vocalist); Stephen Kaplin (Puppeteer & Set Design); composer, violinist and violist Jeremy Kittel; Chinese percussion master Tian Gang; cellist Tristan Clarridge and Guzheng master Wang Jungling. Post-American Girl was directed by Meiyin Wang, Associate Artistic Producer of The Public's Under The Radar.

== The Wu-Force ==
The Wu-Force played their first show together at the Yugong Yishan music club in Beijing in late 2011 and came back together in early 2014. The Wu-Force made an appearance at TEDxUNC's American Global South conference on March 3, 2013, performing their song "Floating". On January 12, 2014, Washburn performed with a band known as The Wu-Force at Global Fest in New York City. This marked the US debut of the self-described "kung fu-Appalachian avant-garde folk-rock" musical group. The band's multilingual songs feature a variety of content varying between commentary on international relations to environmental issues in China to Chinese folk and operatic reinterpretations to cheeky instrumental pieces. The band also includes multi-instrumentalist and frequent collaborator Kai Welch, and Chinese zither (guzheng) player Wu Fei. In addition to playing in New York, the trio played a residency in Nashville and set of tour dates scattered throughout the United States while simultaneously recording together. The trio also played the World Music Festival Chicago in September 2014. They released a self-titled EP On January 27, 2017.

Wu Fei and Washburn released a self-titled album on April 3, 2020, produced by Béla Fleck.

== Béla Fleck & Abigail Washburn ==
With the birth of their son in May 2013, Washburn began a new era in her career. With the intent to keep the family together, the two began to make public appearances as a duo collaboration. Beginning in August 2013, Fleck and Washburn began a steady tour schedule of duo dates (sometimes affectionately referred to as "trio") billed as "Béla Fleck & Abigail Washburn". A year later, they announced that their first duo album, featuring only banjos and their voices, would be released on Rounder Records. The two recorded their album in their home and produced the record themselves. The album debuted at #1 on the Billboard Bluegrass charts and won the duo a Grammy Award for Best Folk Album.

== Personal life ==
Washburn is married to banjo player Béla Fleck. Washburn first met Fleck in Nashville at a square dance where she was dancing and he was playing. In August 2007, Washburn was reported as being the "girlfriend" of Fleck. In May 2009, the Bluegrass Intelligencer website satirized the union, with Driessen joking that the couple promised a "male heir" who will be the "Holy Banjo Emperor". In February 2010, The Aspen Times reported that Fleck was Washburn's husband. On Sunday May 19, 2013, Washburn gave birth to their son in Nashville. Their second son, Theo, was born in 2018.

== Activism ==
Washburn, along with 24 other innovative and creative thinkers worldwide, was named a TED fellow and gave a talk at the 2012 TED Convention in Long Beach about building US-China relations through music. On November 19, 2013 Washburn was officially named the first US-China Center Fellow of Vanderbilt University because of her work as an ambassador of American culture to China and her enthusiasm and willingness to help the US-China Center at Vanderbilt University in any way possible.

== Discography ==
Title	Album details	Peak chart positions			
Title	Album details	US Grass	US	US Heat	US Folk
She Waits for Night ( as a member of Uncle Earl)	Release date: July 19, 2005; Label: Rounder	6	—	—	—
Song of the Traveling Daughter	Release date: August 2, 2005; Label: Nettwerk	3	—	—	—
The Sparrow Quartet EP	Released date: May 29, 2006; Label: Nettwerk	—	—	—	—
Waterloo, Tennessee ( as a member of Uncle Earl)	Release date: March 13, 2007; Label: Rounder	2	—	—	—
Abigail Washburn & The Sparrow Quartet (with the Sparrow Quartet)	Released date: May 20, 2008; Label: Nettwerk	1	—	—	—
Afterquake (with Shanghai Restoration Project)	Released date: May 5, 2009; Label: Afterquake Music	—	—	—	—
City of Refuge	Release date: January 11, 2011; Label: Rounder	2	—	9	—
Béla Fleck & Abigail Washburn (with Béla Fleck)	Release date: October 7, 2014; Label: Rounder	1	118	3	8
Banjo Banjo (EP) (with Béla Fleck)	Release date: August 21, 2015; Label: Rounder	13	—	—	—
Echo in the Valley (with Béla Fleck)	Release date: October 20, 2017; Label: Rounder	—	—	—	—
"—" denotes releases that did not chart
