= Béla Fleck & Abigail Washburn =

Studio album by Béla Fleck & Abigail Washburn
- Released: October 7, 2014
- Genres: Folk; bluegrass; Americana
- Length: 45.55
- Label: Rounder Records
- Producers: Béla Fleck; Abigail Washburn

Béla Fleck chronology
The Impostor (2013)	Béla Fleck & Abigail Washburn (2014)	Two (2015)

Abigail Washburn chronology
City of Refuge (2011)	Béla Fleck & Abigail Washburn (2013)	Banjo Banjo (EP) (2015)

Professional ratings
Review scores
Source	Rating
The Guardian	link

Béla Fleck & Abigail Washburn is the first album for Béla Fleck & Abigail Washburn as a duo. It won the 2016 Grammy for Best Folk Album.

== Track listing ==
No.	Title	Writer(s)	Length
1.	"Railroad"	Traditional	3:38
2.	"Ride to U"	Abigail Washburn	4:17
3.	"What'cha Gonna Do"	Béla Fleck	3:48
4.	"Little Birdie"	Béla Fleck; Abigail Washburn	4:21
5.	"New South Africa"	Béla Fleck	4:36
6.	"Pretty Polly"	Traditional	3:45
7.	"Shotgun Blues"	Abigail Washburn	3:18
8.	"For Children: No. 3 Quasi Adagio/No. 10 Allegro Molto - Children's Dance"	Béla Bartók	2:16
9.	"And Am I Born to Die"	Traditional	4:02
10.	"Banjo Banjo"	Béla Fleck; Abigail Washburn	3:51
11.	"What Are They Doing in Heaven Today?"	Traditional	4:37
12.	"Bye Bye Baby Blues"	Béla Fleck; Juno Fleck; Little Hat Jones; Abigail Washburn	3:26
Total length:			45:55
