= Uncle Earl =

American old-time music group

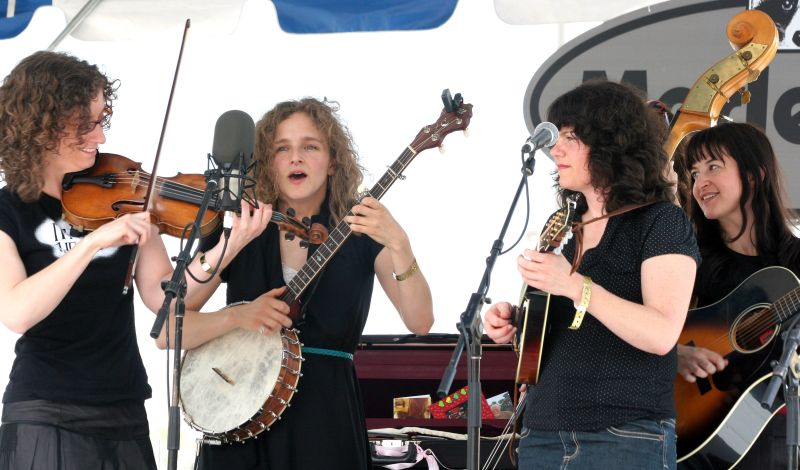
- Uncle Earl in 2007; from left to right: Rayna Gellert, Abigail Washburn, KC Groves and Kristin Andreassen

Background information
- Origin: United States
- Genres: Americana, Old-time music
- Years active: 2000–present
- Label: Rounder
- Members: KC Groves, Kristin Andreassen, Stephanie Coleman, Paula Bradley, Rachel Eddy
- Past members: Jo Serrapere, Tahmineh Gueramy, Amanda Kowalski, Sharon Gilchrist, Casey Henry, Sally Truitt, Rayna Gellert, Abigail Washburn, Bryn Davies
- Website: uncleearl.net

Uncle Earl is an American old-time music group, formed in 2000 by KC Groves and Jo Serrapere. Currently the lineup consists of four women, all of whom share vocal duties: KC Groves, Kristin Andreassen, Abigail Washburn, and Rayna Gellert. They have released three albums and two EPs, and their fifth album Waterloo, Tennessee was produced by John Paul Jones of Led Zeppelin.

== History ==
=== 1999-2002: Founding ===
Groves and Serrapere, both American songwriters and multi-instrumentalists, started the band in 2000. (The Uncle Earl biography, however, had 1999 as the founding year.) According to the founders, they had no original interest in starting a band. Instead, they wanted to promote a CD with traditional material they had recorded, and put together a small temporary lineup to play a few shows. After the initial performances went well, the group decided to stay together. Until the end of 2003 the line-up of the band had changed several times. Amongst the members in this period where Tahmineh Gueramy (fiddle, vocals), Amanda Kowalski (bass, vocals), Casey Henry (banjo, vocals) and Sally Truitt (bass, vocals).

Groves mentioned in an interview how the band got its name, "We just thought it would be a funny name for an all-women's group," she says. "But we are fans of Earl Scruggs, Steve Earle, and Uncle Tupelo. It did come up in our discussion that there's some important Earls in this business. And Uncles." They refer to themselves as "the g'Earls," while their fans have been nicknamed "g'Earlfriends."

=== 2002-2010: Albums ===
External videos
- Music Video for "Streak o' Lean, Streak o' Fat" by Uncle Earl (Nov 20, 2009)

In 2002 the band released their album She Went Upstairs.

Founding member Serrapere left in 2003, and as of 2008 played with the Willie Dunns. By the end of 2003 a long-lasting lineup was in place, with all the band members serving as co-vocalists. The 2003 lineup consisted of KC Groves on mandolin and guitar, Abigail Washburn on banjo, Rayna Gellert on fiddle and Kristin Andreassen, guitarist, fiddler, and clogging. There was no permanent bass player.

In 2004, the group released their first EP, titled Going to the Western Slope. Several months later, they released their sophomore EP Raise a Ruckus. In 2005 the band was signed to Rounder Records, who released their first full-length album, She Waits for Night, later that year. Their second full-length album, Waterloo, TN, was released on Rounder Records in 2007.

In late 2009, the band failed to go on tour, quoting trouble coordinating band members' schedules.

=== 2010-present ===
In 2010, the band announced that Gellert and Washburn had left on amicable terms, and were pursuing other musical projects. The new Uncle Earl line up is Andreassen, Groves, Stephanie Coleman on fiddle, Paula Bradley on banjo, banjo ukulele and clogging, and Rachel Eddy on banjo, fiddle, and bass. The lineup toured in support of their previous album in 2010, and continue to periodically perform.

== Members ==
=== Current as of 2014 ===
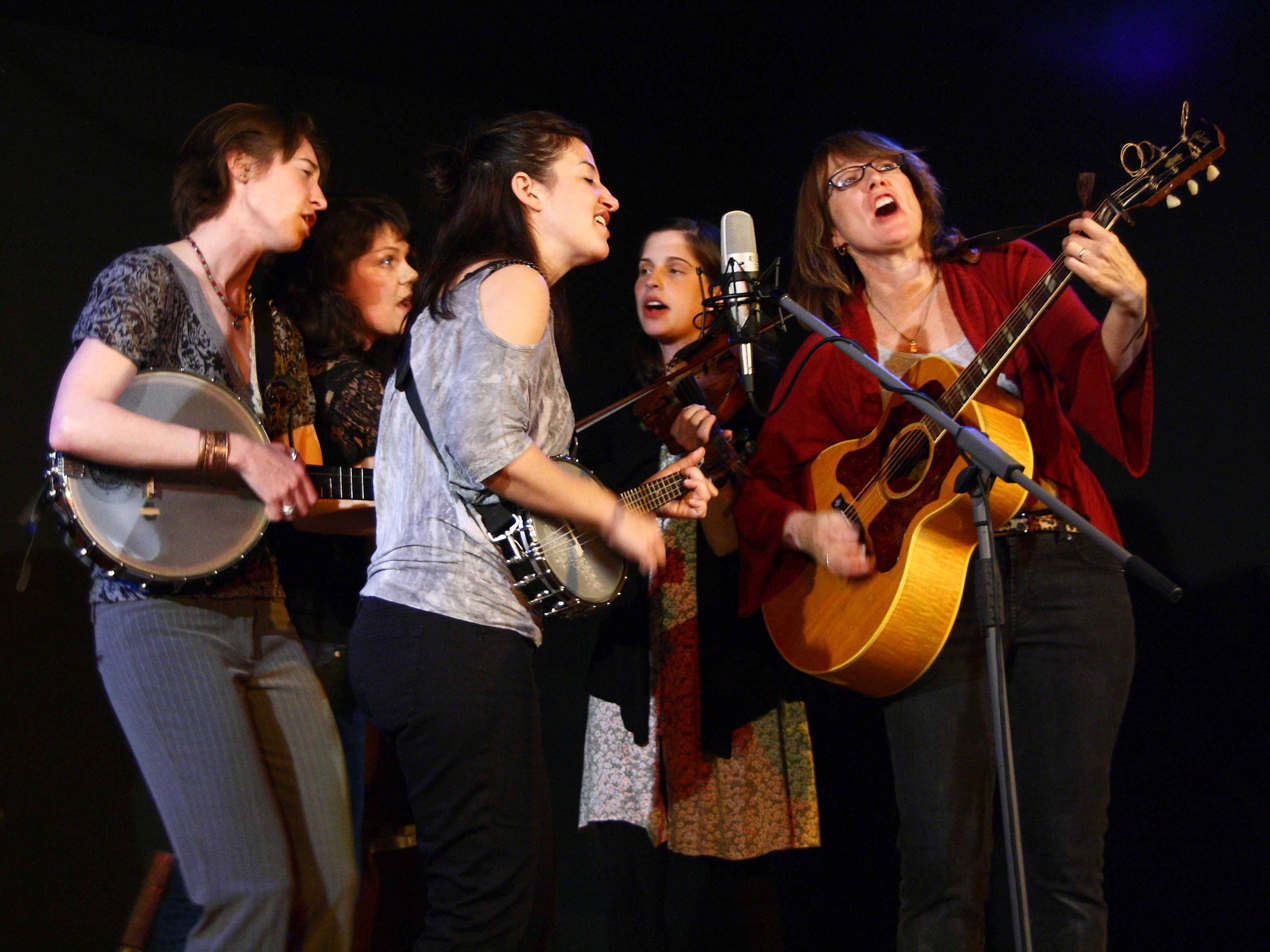
European tour 2010 at Kult, Niederstetten; from left to right: Rachel Eddy, KC Groves, Kristin Andreassen, Stephanie Coleman and Paula Bradley

- KC Groves (1999–present) - vocals, mandolin and guitar
- Kristin Andreassen (2003–present) - vocals, guitarist, fiddler, and clogging
- Stephanie Coleman (2010–present) - fiddle
- Paula Bradley (2010–present) - banjo, banjo ukulele and clogging
- Rachel Eddy (2010–present) - banjo, fiddle, and bass

=== Past members ===
- Jo Serrapere (1999-2003) - vocals, etc.
- Amanda Kowalski (~2000-2003) - bass, vocals
- Casey Henry (~2000-2003) - banjo, vocals
- Sally Truitt (~2000-2003) - bass, vocals
- Tahmineh Gueramy (~2000-2003) - fiddle, vocals
- Rayna Gellert (2003-2010) - vocals, fiddle
- Abigail Washburn (2003-2010) - banjo, vocals
- Sharon Gilchrist (2004-2005, 2010) - bass
- Bryn Davies - bass

=== Bass players ===
The band has had a mostly rotating line-up of bass players. For nearly four years Amanda Kowalski played upright bass with Uncle Earl. Sharon Gilchrist joined the band in late 2004 and can be heard on the seven song EP Raise a Ruckus. There is a long list of other bassists with whom Uncle Earl have performed. On their website the band mentions Eric Thorin, Sally Truitt, Erin Coats Youngberg, Alana Rocklin, Mary Lucey, Bryn Davies, Laura Cortese, Kyle Kegerreis, Missy Raines, and Dan Rose, with whom they recorded the album She Waits for Night. Youngberg and Thorin play bass on the album Waterloo, Tennessee.

Bassist Sharon Gilchrist left the band in early 2005 to play mandolin in the Peter Rowan and Tony Rice Quartet. However Gilchrist played again at their 2010 Australian Tour. Rachel Eddy joined so KC Groves largely handles the bass.

== Discography ==
Studio albums

- 2002: She Went Upstairs...
- 2005: She Waits for Night (Rounder Records)
- 2007: Waterloo, Tennessee (Rounder Records)

EPs

- 2004: Going to the Western Slope EP
- 2004: Raise a Ruckus EP

== Gallery ==
Main gallery: Uncle Earl at WikiCommons

== See also ==
- Old-time music
