= Mother Falcon =

- Origin: Austin, Texas, United States
- Genres: Symphonic rock; art rock; orchestral pop
- Years active: 2008–present
- Labels: Creme Fraiche; Punctum Records; We Are: The Guard
- Website: motherfalconmus.com

Mother Falcon is a symphonic rock band from Austin, Texas, known for their wide-ranging instrumentation and collaborative songwriting. Formed by bandleader Nick Gregg in 2008, the group grew to include a collective of more than twenty musicians playing strings, horns, guitars, and percussion. The group was most active between 2010 and 2016, after which they scaled back and began new projects including theatrical scores and an annual music education camp. Since the release of their final album Good Luck Have Fun, released in 2015 by Universal, the band has continued to perform in the Austin area.

== History ==
=== 2008–2012: Formation and first releases ===
Nick Gregg formed Mother Falcon in 2008 with members of the Red Armada String Quartet, a high school ensemble that had studied with the noted Austin composers Graham Reynolds and Peter Stopschinski at the Austin Chamber Music Center. The name derived from a scene in the censored version of the 1988 action film Die Hard, where main character John McClane's speech is altered to say "mother falcon" instead of the original "motherfucker". Additional members came from McCallum High School, Westlake High School, St. Edward's University, and the University of Texas at Austin, where Gregg graduated in architecture.

As Mother Falcon grew in number, live performances could include as few as eleven and as many as twenty musicians. The core group of vocalists came to include Gregg, as well as guitarist Claire Puckett and accordionist-pianist Tamir Kalifa. The collective self-released their debut EP Still Life in 2010. In 2011, the collective released their first full-length album Alhambra. Their music was reviewed positively by the local press and placed twice on the cover of the Austin Chronicle. At the 2010, 2011 and 2012 Austin Music Awards, Mother Falcon won the "Best None of The Above" award. In 2011, the group performed at the abandoned Seaholm Power Plant in Austin at the opening of the Fusebox Festival. In 2012, Mother Falcon headlined The Austin Chamber Music Festival. Around this time, the band began to perform in all black clothing with red accents, which bandleader Nick Gregg says allows audiences to focus on the music but is also an homage to the band's classical roots.

=== 2013–2016: You Knew and acclaim ===
In May 2013, Mother Falcon released their sophomore album You Knew. The release coincided with many of the members' college graduations. The band began to garner national attention, including press from NPR, The Daily Beast, The Washington Post, The New York Times, and Texas Monthly.

After the release of You Knew, Mother Falcon began touring regularly. In June 2013, the band relocated to New York City for the month where they had residencies at Joe's Pub in Manhattan and Littlefield in Brooklyn, followed by residences at The Echo in Los Angeles and Soda Bar in San Diego later in the year. While in New York, the band collaborated with other composers and performers including Jherek Bischoff, Amanda Palmer, Raul Midon, Tony Trischka, Ben Sollee, Kelli Scarr, and Gary Lucas. They toured the West Coast in August 2013 and again in February 2014, and headlined the IdeaFestival in Louisville, Kentucky in September 2013. The band returned to the Northeast in January 2014, playing as a part of the Winter Jazz Festival at Le Poisson Rouge in New York City.

During some of these shows, Mother Falcon would play two sets; the first set focused on the collective's original music and the second set would see them play Radiohead's OK Computer in its entirety. In March 2014, the band released their reimagining of OK Computer as a digital album.

In October 2015, Mother Falcon released a new studio album Good Luck Have Fun. Originally slated to be released in August 2015, the record was picked up and released through Universal Music Group's Classics division in the Fall; Good Luck Have Fun was Mother Falcon's major label debut, despite not being signed to the label at the time. The first half of the record is a collection of symphonic pop songs while the second half is the contemporary classical Starnation Suite, a seven-song score written for the independent e-sports documentary ProGamer. In 2015, Mother Falcon co-headlined a major American tour with Ben Sollee called The Fall Migration. The last show they played during this album cycle outside of their hometown was a show at Joe's Pub in New York City in July 2016.

=== 2017–present: New projects and transformation ===
The beginning of 2017 marked a new era for Mother Falcon. Around this time, the band faced crossroads as a whole and as individuals. Some members wanted to or had already moved cross country to pursue further degrees or focus more on their professional careers. Ultimately, the group had to redefine its goals and the scope of the collective. In December 2016, the group turned down a recording contract with Universal Music Classics which would have required the group to produce three more albums after Good Luck Have Fun. That same month the band played a retrospective show in Austin to mark the end of this era.

From 2017 through 2019, the group was involved a smaller but more diverse set of projects. These included members continuing to conduct the Mother Falcon Music Lab, composing and performing scores for live theater, and continuing to perform from time to time around Austin, particularly at the SXSW music festival.

Many of the members were involved in Lionheart Youth Theatre/Glass Half Full Theatre's original production Petra and the Wolf. Mother Falcon composed the score which is performed live by the band at the shows. Petra and the Wolf premiered in Austin in December 2015. The following December, the production ran in Austin again. Following this, the entire production began to tour nationally. This included one-off shows for different organizations as well as a November 2017 East Coast Tour and a January-April 2018 Midwest/West Coast tour. Mother Falcon plans to release the score in late 2019.

On Valentine's Day 2018, Mother Falcon released a new single, a reworking of their 2015 song "You Are" on the We Are: The Guard record label. In March 2019, the group released their cover of "I Can't Stand the Rain" as a single and hinted at new music to come.

During the first half of August 2019, Mother Falcon performed original music for Trouble Puppet Theater Company's American Blood Song: A Puppet Operetta of The Donner Party. Mother Falcon performed as a cello-guitar-saxophone trio.

In March 2022, Mother Falcon performed as a 9-piece at the Parker Jazz Club in Austin, where they performed 3 new songs along with material from their past studio albums, indicating a return to the studio and a new album cycle.

== Summer camp ==
Since 2011, Mother Falcon has hosted a summer camp, the Mother Falcon Music Lab, for middle and high-school aged musicians in Austin, Texas. The band has played and curated a series of benefit shows over the years to support the camp's need-based scholarship program.

== In media ==
In 2012, Mother Falcon was featured in two episodes of the James Franco-produced documentary web series Undergrads: South. The show premiered at the 2012 SXSW Film Festival. Later that year, they were the featured artist in an episode of Arts in Context, a series produced by Austin PBS station KLRU.

The band wrote the original score of the independent esports documentary ProGamer, which premiered at the 2016 Austin Film Festival.

== Members ==
- Clara Brill – violin (2010–present)
- Diana Burgess – cello (2010–present)
- Tamir Kalifa – accordion, piano, synthesizer, bouzouki, vocals, guitar (2010–present)
- Nick Gregg – vocals, cello, guitar, mandolin; producer (2010–present)
- Evan Kaspar – pedal steel, percussion, vibraphone; producer, engineer (2010–present)
- Matt Krolick – trumpet (2010–present)
- Claire Puckett – guitar, vocals, bouzouki, mandolin, banjo, trumpet, piano (2010–present)
- Dusty Rhodes – electric bass, upright bass (2010–present)
- Sterling Steffen – tenor saxophone, clarinet (2010–present)
- Isaac Winburne – drums, percussion, alto saxophone, vocals (2012–present)
- Andrew Fontenot – tenor sax, vocals (2010–2016; contributing 2016–present)
- Roy Thomas – trumpet (2013–present)

Former members

- Matt Puckett – guitar, banjo, piano, alto saxophone, percussion, synthesizer; producer (2010–2016)
- Laura Andrade – cello (2010–2016)
- Rita Andrade – viola (2010–2016)
- Hannah Mohan – vocals (2014)
- Thor Harris – vibraphone, dulcimer (contributing c. 2012)
- Kira Bordelon – violin (2010–2014)
- Nick Calvin – cello (2010–2014)
- Maurice Chammah – violin, viola, vocals, piano (2010–2014)
- Austin Harris – violin (2010–2014)
- Gilman Lykken – bassoon (2010–2014)
- Josh Newburger – violin (2010–2014)
- Lisa Lam – violin (2010–)
- Yun Du – violin (2010–2012)
- Luke Stence – upright bass (2010–2012)

== Discography ==
=== Studio albums ===
| Title | Album details |
|---|---|
| Still Life EP | Released: March 1, 2010; Label: self-released; Format: CD, digital |
| Alhambra | Released: February 26, 2011; Label: Creme Fraiche; Format: CD, digital |
| You Knew | Released: May 7, 2013; Label: Creme Fraiche; Format: CD, digital |
| Good Luck Have Fun | Released: October 9, 2015; Label: Universal Music Classics, Punctum Records; Format: CD, digital |

=== Other albums ===
- Alive at IdeaFestival (2013) – self-released
- MF Computer (Radiohead's OK Computer Reimagined) (2014) – Creme Fraiche

=== Scores ===
- Petra and the Wolf (Lionheart Youth Theatre/Glass Half Full Theatre, 2015 and 2018)
- ProGamer (documentary film, 2016); released as part of Good Luck Have Fun
- The Messengers (documentary film, 2017)
- American Blood Song: A Puppet Operetta of The Donner Party (Trouble Puppet Theater Company, 2019)

=== Singles ===
As lead artist

| Title (A-side/B-side) | Year | Album | Notes |
|---|---|---|---|
| "Pennies" | 2012 | non-album single | |
| "Dirty Summer" / "Alligator Teeth" (Alternative Version) | 2013 | You Knew | |
| "Lose Yourself to Dance" (Daft Punk cover) (featuring Ben Sollee) | 2013 | non-album singles | |
| "Dirty Summer" / "Alligator Teeth" | 2014 | non-album singles | 7" rerelease |
| "You've Got Everything Now" (The Smiths cover) | 2015 | Tease Torment Tantalize | The Smiths tribute compilation |
| "You Are" / "Scene 5" | 2018 | Petra and the Wolf Suite | Original theatrical score |
| "You Are" | 2019 | non-album singles | Rerecorded version |
| "I Can't Stand the Rain" (Ann Peebles cover) | 2019 | non-album singles | |

As featured artist

| Title | Year | Album | Notes |
|---|---|---|---|
| "The Anthem Part 2" (Tim Kubart feat. Mother Falcon) | 2013 | Anthems for Adventure | |
| "Sacramento & Polk" (Alejandro Escovedo feat. Mother Falcon) | 2013 | All Atx | Compilation album |
