= Daniel Martin Moore =

American singer-songwriter

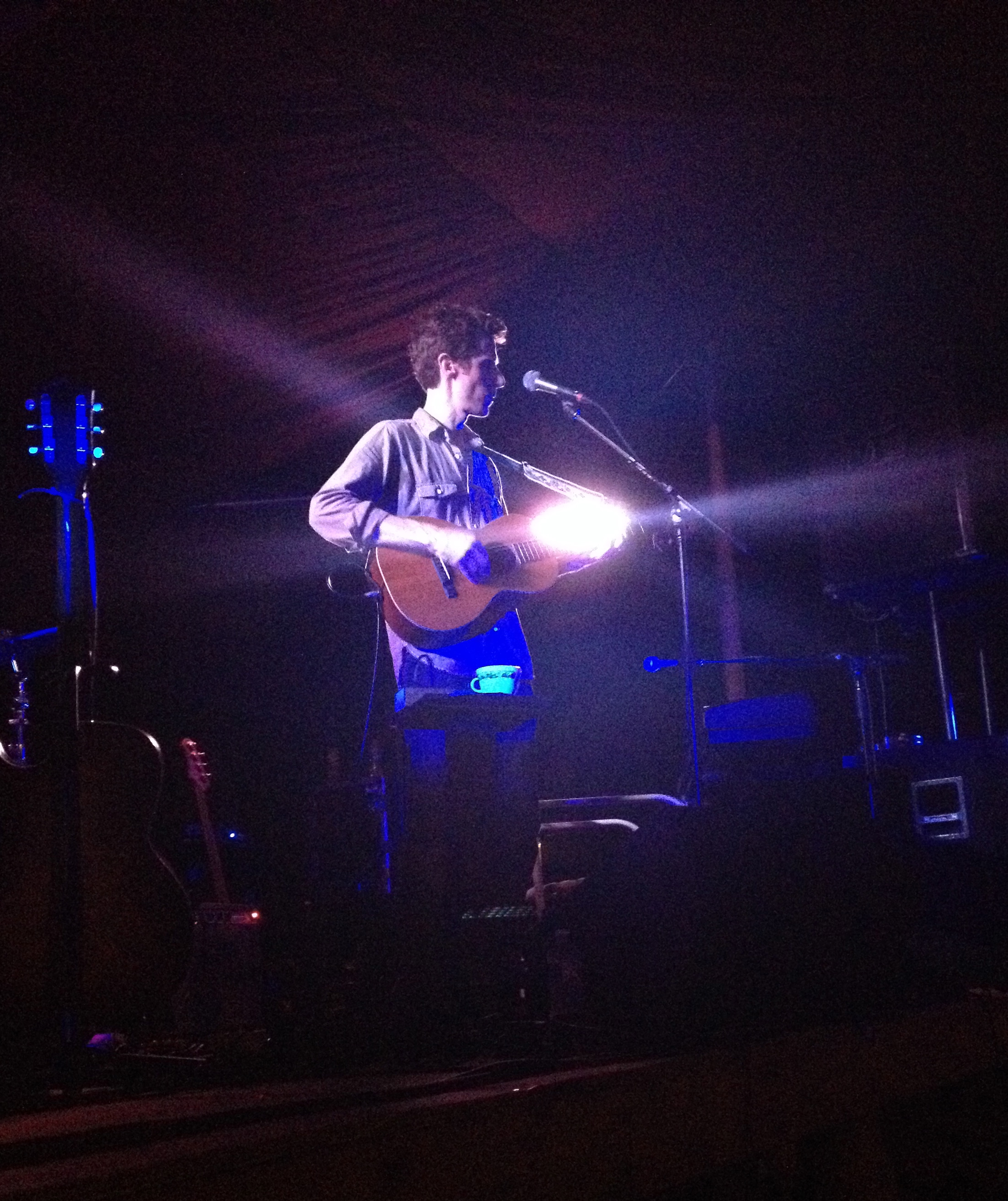
- Moore performing on June 21, 2014

Background information
- Born: Elizabethtown, Kentucky, United States
- Origin: Cold Spring, Kentucky, United States
- Genres: Folk
- Occupation(s): Musician, singer-songwriter, producer
- Instrument(s): Vocals, guitar, piano, banjo
- Years active: 2008–present
- Labels: Sub Pop
- Website: www.danielmartinmoore.com

Daniel Martin Moore is an American singer, musician, songwriter, and producer.

== Musical career ==
After leaving the Peace Corps, Moore mailed Sub Pop Records a four-song unsolicited demo in January 2007 and was signed by the label to record his first album Stray Age, which was co-produced by Joe Chiccarelli.

In 2010, Moore joined with fellow Kentucky musician Ben Sollee to record an album titled Dear Companion, which was produced by and also features Jim James of My Morning Jacket and Monsters of Folk. Dear Companion aims to create awareness of the problems surrounding mountaintop removal coal mining in Appalachia, with Moore and Sollee donating their artist profits from the album to Appalachian Voices in support of the organization's national campaign to end mountaintop removal mining. In 2010, Moore toured with Ben Sollee and Jim James with stops in Brooklyn and at the Newport Folk Festival where Moore also performed with the Preservation Hall Jazz Band.

In January 2011, Moore released a gospel album, In the Cool of the Day, which was inspired by an old in-house Steinway piano he played during a studio session at WVXU Radio in Cincinnati. To promote his new album, Moore toured the UK and Ireland with Iron and Wine in March 2011. Also in 2011, Moore founded the record label Ol Kentuck Recordings. The first Ol Kentuck release was Maiden Radio's Lullabies.

In May 2012, Moore released Farthest Field on the Ol Kentuck Recordings label. The album is a duo-project between Moore and frequent collaborator, Joan Shelley, a Louisville, Kentucky-based singer and songwriter.

In August 2013, Moore announced that his next album would be a collection of rare, previously unreleased recordings and collaborations with Jim James, Haley Bonar, Joan Shelley, and others. The album titled Archives Vol. I was released in October 2013 through the direct-to-fan platform PledgeMusic.

== Discography ==
- Stray Age (2008)
- Dear Companion (with Ben Sollee) (2010)
- In the Cool of the Day (2011)
- Farthest Field (with Joan Shelley) (2012)
- Archives Vol. I (2013)
- Golden Age (2015)
- Turned Over To Dreams (2017)
- Never Look Away (2019)

== Production credits ==
- Living Room - Daniel Joseph Dorff, 2011 (Produced, recorded and mixed as "DMM")
- Ginko - Joan Shelley, 2012 (As "DMM")
- The Quiltbox Sessions - Daniel Joseph Dorff & Ronnie Kuller, 2013 (Produced, recorded and mixed as "DMM")
- So It Was - So It Was, 2019 (Produced, recorded and mixed as "DMM")
