= Rayna Gellert =

American singer-songwriter (born 1975)

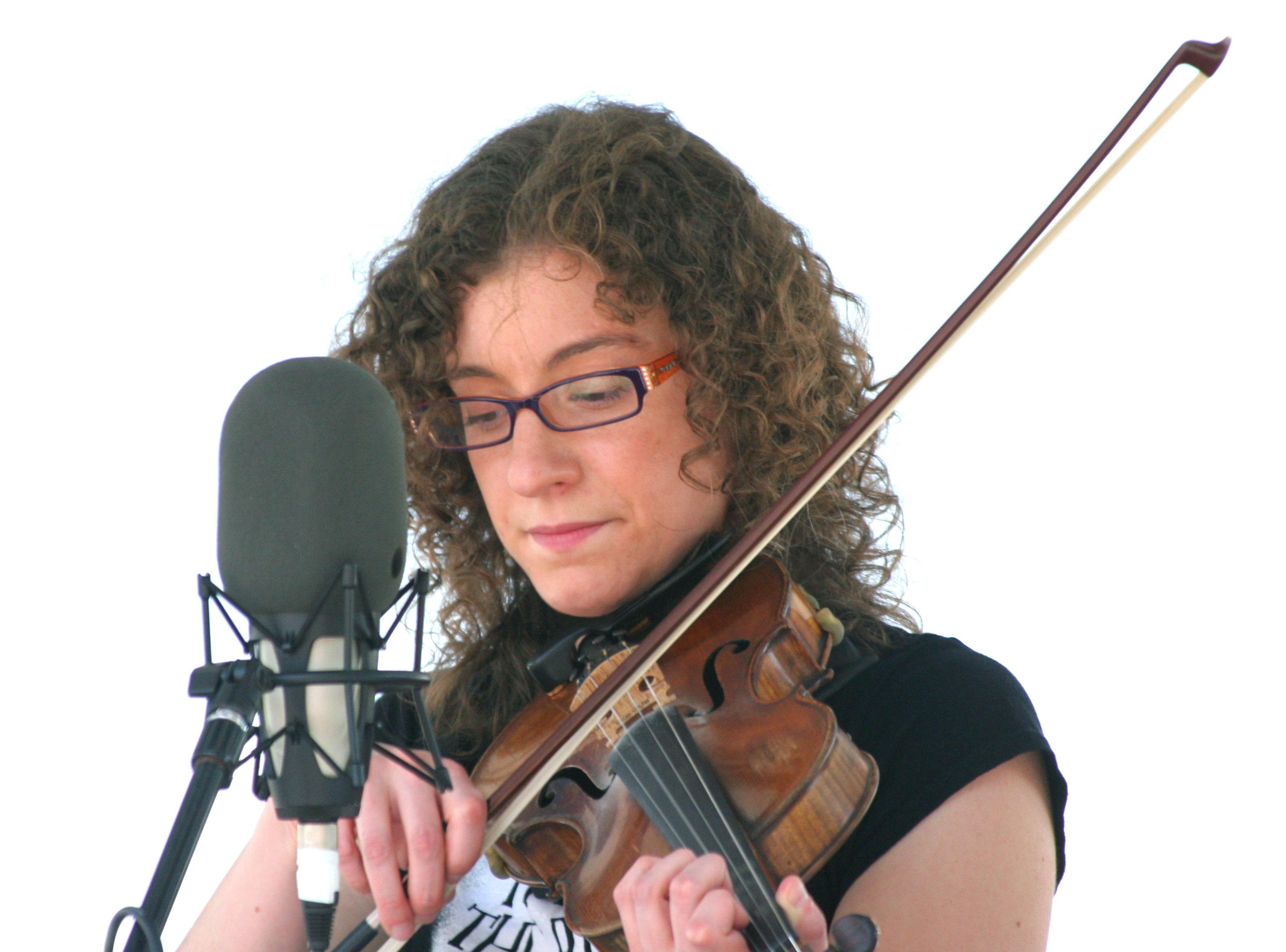
- Gellert at MerleFest 2007

Background information
- Born: Rayna Gellert; December 15, 1975 (age 50)
- Origin: Indiana, U.S.
- Genres: Folk, americana, bluegrass
- Instruments: Violin, acoustic guitar, vocals
- Website: Rayna Gellert's website

Rayna Gellert (born December 15, 1975) is an American fiddler, acoustic guitarist, singer, and songwriter specializing in old-time music.

Gellert is a former member of the Freight Hoppers. From 2003 to 2009 she performed and recorded with the all-female old-time band Uncle Earl. In 2003, she was a featured performer at the Smithsonian Folklife Festival. She has also performed with the dance company Rhythm in Shoes, the West African-influenced band Toubab Krewe, Abigail Washburn, and Scott Miller. She has toured throughout the United States, Europe, and Chile.

She has been a finalist at the Appalachian String Band Music Festival in Clifftop, Fayette County, West Virginia several times.

== Early life and education ==
Rayna Gellert was born on December 15, 1975. She grew up in Elkhart, in northern Indiana, formerly lived in Asheville, North Carolina, and is currently based in Nashville, Tennessee. Her father is the traditional fiddler, banjo player, and singer Dan Gellert. Originally a classically trained violinist, she took up the old-time fiddle in 1994, when she moved to North Carolina to attend Warren Wilson College. She received a bachelor's degree from Warren Wilson College. Gellert plays a fiddle that belonged to her great-grandfather, a Hungarian orchestral musician, and guitar.

== Career ==
Gellert has played and recorded with Abigail Washburn, Loudon Wainwright III, Tyler Ramsey, Robyn Hitchcock, and others. She has appeared at music festivals including Bonnaroo, Telluride Bluegrass Festival, and RockyGrass. She has also taught at the John C. Campbell Folk School.

== Discography ==
=== As leader ===
- Ways of the World (2000)
- Old Light- Songs from my Childhood & Other Gone Worlds (2012)
- Workin's Too Hard (2017)

=== With Uncle Earl ===
- 2004 - Going to the Western Slope (EP)
- 2004 - Raise A Ruckus (EP)
- 2005 - She Waits For Night (Rounder)
- 2007 - Waterloo, Tennessee (Rounder)

=== With Susie Goehring ===
- Starch & Iron (2005)

=== With Scott Miller ===
==== Extended plays ====
- CoDependents (2012)

=== With The Brothers K ===
==== Extended plays ====
- Rayna Gellert & the Brothers K (2015)

=== With Kieran Kane ===
- The Ledges (2018)
- When the Sun Goes Down (2019)
- The Flowers That Bloom in Spring (2022)

=== Filmography ===
Killers of the Flower Moon (2023)
