= Casey Driessen =

American bluegrass fiddler and singer

Casey Christopher Driessen (born December 6, 1978, in Owatonna, Minnesota, United States) is an American fiddler, singer, educator, and recording artist known for his work in bluegrass, Americana, and experimental string music. He plays acoustic and electric five-string violins. The five-string violin has an additional low C string not found on the standard violin. He is recognized as a fiddle-singing pioneer.

He is a graduate of the Berklee College of Music, where he studied with Matt Glaser, and an alumnus of Homewood-Flossmoor High School in Flossmoor, Ill. He served as the director of the master’s degree program in contemporary performance with production concentration at Berklee's campus in Valencia, Spain, from 2015 to 2019.

He has performed with Béla Fleck, Abigail Washburn, Steve Earle, Tim O'Brien, Darrell Scott, Jim Lauderdale, Lee Ann Womack, Mark Schatz, John Doyle, and Chris Thile. He has recorded with Darol Anger, John Mayer, Jerry Douglas, Jamey Haddad, and Blue Merle. He performed with Dave Matthews Band on May 16, 2026 in Charlotte, North Carolina, and again on June 11, 2026 in Queens, New York. He has also recorded on the soundtrack for the Johnny Cash film Walk the Line. He has toured with The Duhks, replacing Tania Elizabeth.

In November 2006 Driessen toured China and Tibet with the Sparrow Quartet (which also includes Béla Fleck, Abigail Washburn, and cellist Ben Sollee). He also has his own band, the Colorfools, which includes Matt Mangano on bass and Tom "Tommy G" Giampietro on drums.

His first solo recording, 3D, was released in May 2006 on Sugar Hill Records. The track Jerusalem Ridge received a 2007 Grammy Award nomination for Best Country Instrumental Performance. With fiddler Darol Anger and Rushad Eggleston, he has released an instructional DVD entitled Chops & Grooves: Rhythmic Explorations for Bowed Instruments.

He contributed to Crooked Still's CD Shaken By A Low Sound (2006), and Taarka's The Martian Picture Soundtrack. He released his second solo recording, "Oog" (2009), on Red Shoes Records.

== Discography ==
Title	Year	Role / Notes
3D	2006	Solo album; debut release on Sugar Hill Records
Oog	2009	Solo album
The S1ngularity	2013	Solo looping album; self-recorded and self-produced
Eeva Talsi & Casey Driessen	2016	Collaboration with Eeva Talsi
Baaro Saadhanakerige	2020	Collaboration project (track on Otherlands)
Otherlands:ONE	2021	Album from the *Otherlands: A Global Music Exploration* project
