= Sharon Gilchrist =

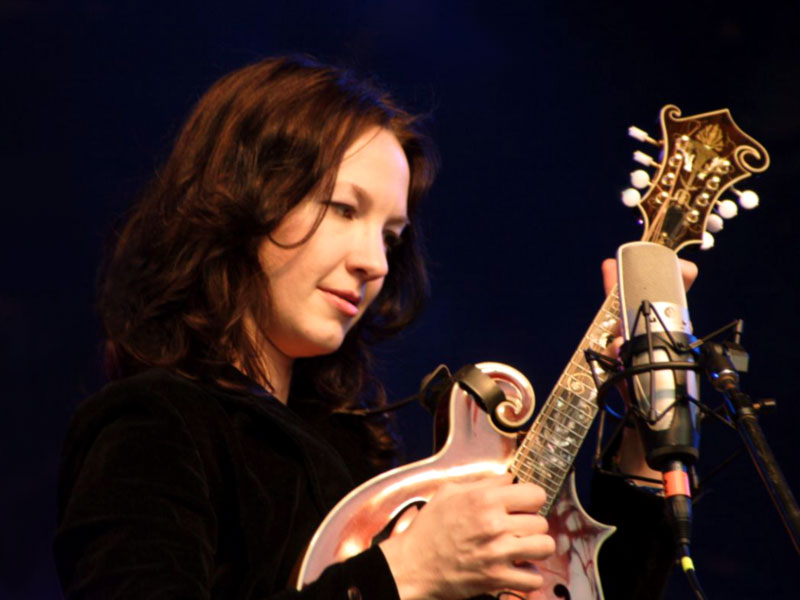
- Gilchrist in 2005

Background information
- Born: 6 October 1972 (age 52)
- Origin: Southlake, Texas; United States
- Genres: Americana; Bluegrass; Country
- Instrument(s): Mandolin, Octave Mandolin, Bass, Vocals
- Labels: Rounder Records

Sharon Gilchrist is an American musician, singer, composer, mandolin instructor and the sister of Troy Gilchrist, also a bluegrass musician.

== Biography ==
=== Youth ===
Raised in Southlake, Texas, a suburb of Dallas, Sharon Gilchrist started playing the mandolin at the age of eight. Kevin Kirckpatrick was her first teacher. Her family moved to the country and Sharon and her brother Troy started taking lessons from Brad and Greg Davis in nearby Grapevine. When she was nine years old, she and her older brother played in a band called "Blue Night Express". The personnel changed and Martie Erwin joined to play the fiddle; later, Martie's sister Emily joined the band (when Todd VanTrice left). Over the next five to six years, Blue Night Express played as a full-time band while the Erwin sisters were still attending the private Greenhill School, in nearby Addison. (Sharon attended Carroll Senior High School in Southlake.) The band appeared with such bluegrass performers as Bill Monroe, Ralph Stanley, Del McCoury, and New Grass Revival. Sharon was playing a Kentucky F5 copy by this time; by fourteen, she was playing an R.L. Givens F5 copy. The Blue Night Express band lasted for nearly seven years and Sharon played with the band from age nine to sixteen. Eventually, the Erwin sisters teamed up with Robin Lynn Macy and Laura Lynch, two women they had met over the years, forming the first lineup of a new band playing predominantly bluegrass, named the Dixie Chicks. Sharon and Troy played as a duo for a couple of years called "Acoustic Manor".

== Leaving Texas ==
Upon graduating from high school, Sharon moved to Nashville, Tennessee to study mandolin at Belmont University where she received a BA in Mandolin Performance.

In Nashville, Sharon played for several years with banjo player James McKinney in Danger in the Air. She also performed and arranged music for Rebecca Stout and the Circus Inebrious a nine-piece alternative-rock/funk band. She worked with many singer-songwriters including Jenny Hall, Jennifer Niceley, Mary Beth Cysewski and Audra and Alayna Maxwell. In 2000, she toured with Josh Rouse and recorded on several of his records. There she also worked as a composer and music director for the conceptual art collective "DddD" and developed an interest for composing music for dance and film. The collective installed work in the Parthenon Gallery and Cheekwood Museum.

=== Mary and Mars ===
In 2001, Sharon moved to Santa Fe, New Mexico. There she met guitarist Ben Wright and bassist Josh Martin and in April 2002 they formed the bluegrass project "Mary and Mars". They recorded two albums while together, and toured for two years throughout the southwestern and northwestern United States, where Sharon had the opportunity to experiment with playing with a variety of bands in related genres: bluegrass, folk and the roots music termed "Americana". The trio was signed to the booking roster of Madison House in Boulder Colorado. In 2004–2005 she played with an early inception of the Bill Hearne Trio, with Susan Holmes on bass. Gilchrist also moved on, in Colorado, meeting the women who comprise the band, Uncle Earl. When "Mary and Mars" separated in August 2004, Sharon began playing with the band.

=== Uncle Earl and Quartet ===
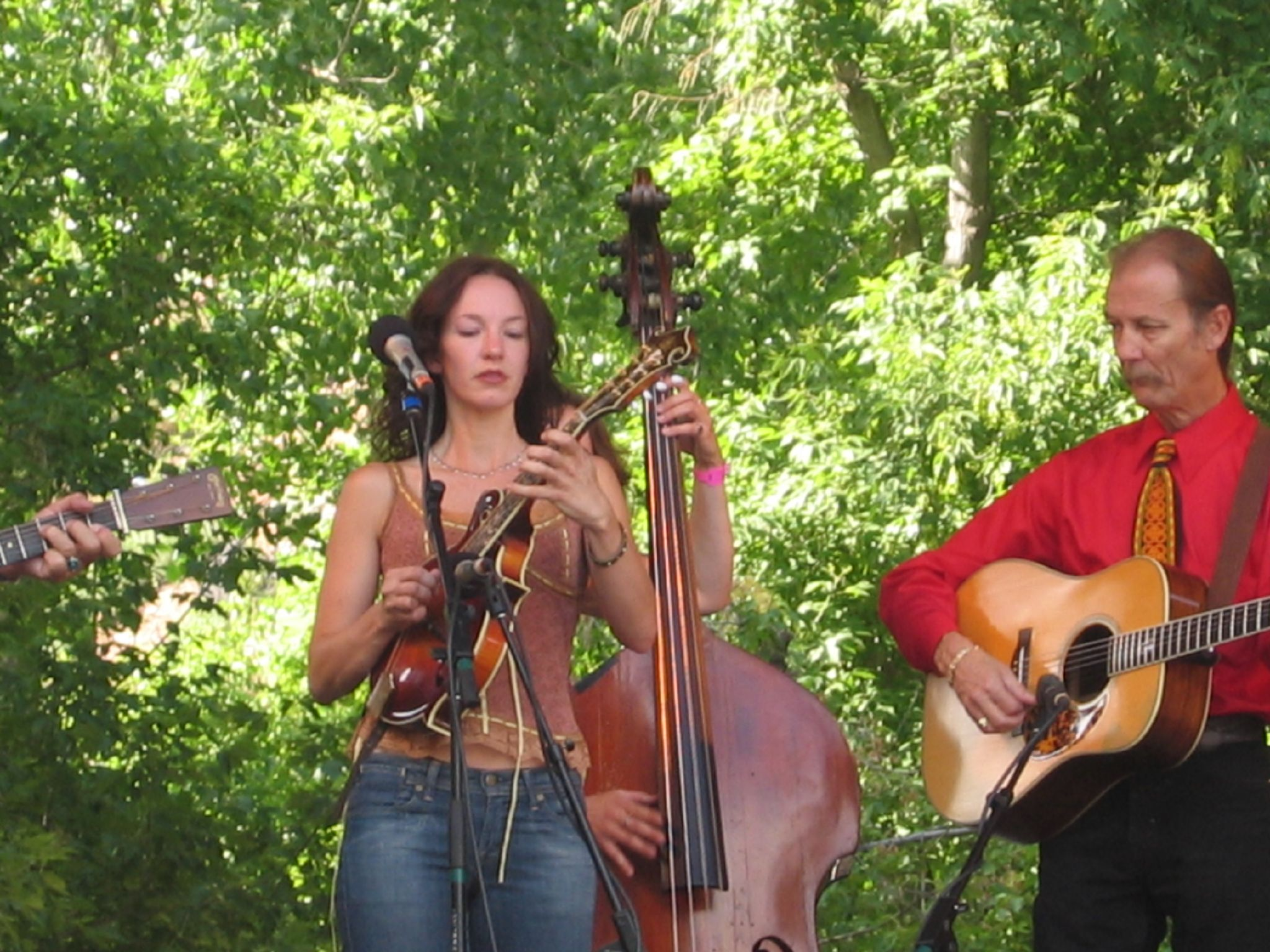
Sharon Gilchrist and Tony Rice in 2005

Sharon joined up with Uncle Earl, an eclectic group of female musicians incorporating dance into their act, playing bass until 2006. In 2005, she also became a full-time member of the Peter Rowan and Tony Rice Quartet joined by bassist/vocalist Bryn Davies. Gilchrist received a glowing review saying she "continued to shine" in 2007, in "Rowans Quartet", appearing at the Americana festival, Merlefest alongside stars of many genres.

== Current work ==
After touring with the Quartet, Sharon's played regularly with Joe West, Susan Holmes and Ben Wright as the "Santa Fe All-Stars". She continued to teach mandolin in the College of Santa Fe (now Santa Fe University of Art and Design) and recently in California. In 2008, Sharon composed music for two film shorts produced by the New Mexico Film Intensive – "Milagros" (sound-track recorded by musician and recording engineer Jono Manson and another entitled, "La Sevillana" composed with Ben Wright and Ezra Bussman. During this time she also began teaching at music camps around the nation (see below). In 2010, Sharon began performing with Darol Anger in several configurations including a special guest performance with The Republic of Strings in 2010, the Cascadia Yulegrass project in 2009 and 2010, with a trio including guitarist, singer-songwriter Scott Law in 2010 and most recently in 2012 with Darol Anger and The Furies. She moved to Oakland, California in 2012 and plays on occasion with Bay Area-based musicians Laurie Lewis and the Right Hands as well as Kathy Kallick and Annie Staninec.

=== Private Mandolin Lessons and Instruction ===
Sharon served as an adjunct professor teaching private mandolin lessons at the College of Santa Fe from 2004 to 2011. She has taught private mandolin lessons since 2001 and has also taught at national music camps and workshops including Bluegrass Week at Augusta Heritage Center in Elkins, West Virginia (2008, 2009, 2010); Mandolin Camp North (2010, 2011, 2012), ZoukFest (2006) Steve Kaufman Kamp (2010), Grand Targhee Bluegrass Camp (2012) and leads mandolin workshops corresponding to her touring schedule. She taught private mandolin lessons at the 5th String music store in Berkeley, California until the store closed. She currently teaches several online mandolin courses and workshops on Peghead Nation.

== Discography ==
- Mary & Mars (w/Mary & Mars 2003)
- Live at the Blinking Light (w/Mary & Mars 2004)
- Raise A Ruckus (EP) (w/Uncle Earl 2004)
- Quartet (w/Peter Rowan, Tony Rice and Bryn Davies 2007)
- Santa Fe All-Stars (EP) (w/Joe West, Ben Wright and Susan Holmes 2008)
