= Sparrow Quartet =

American acoustic music group

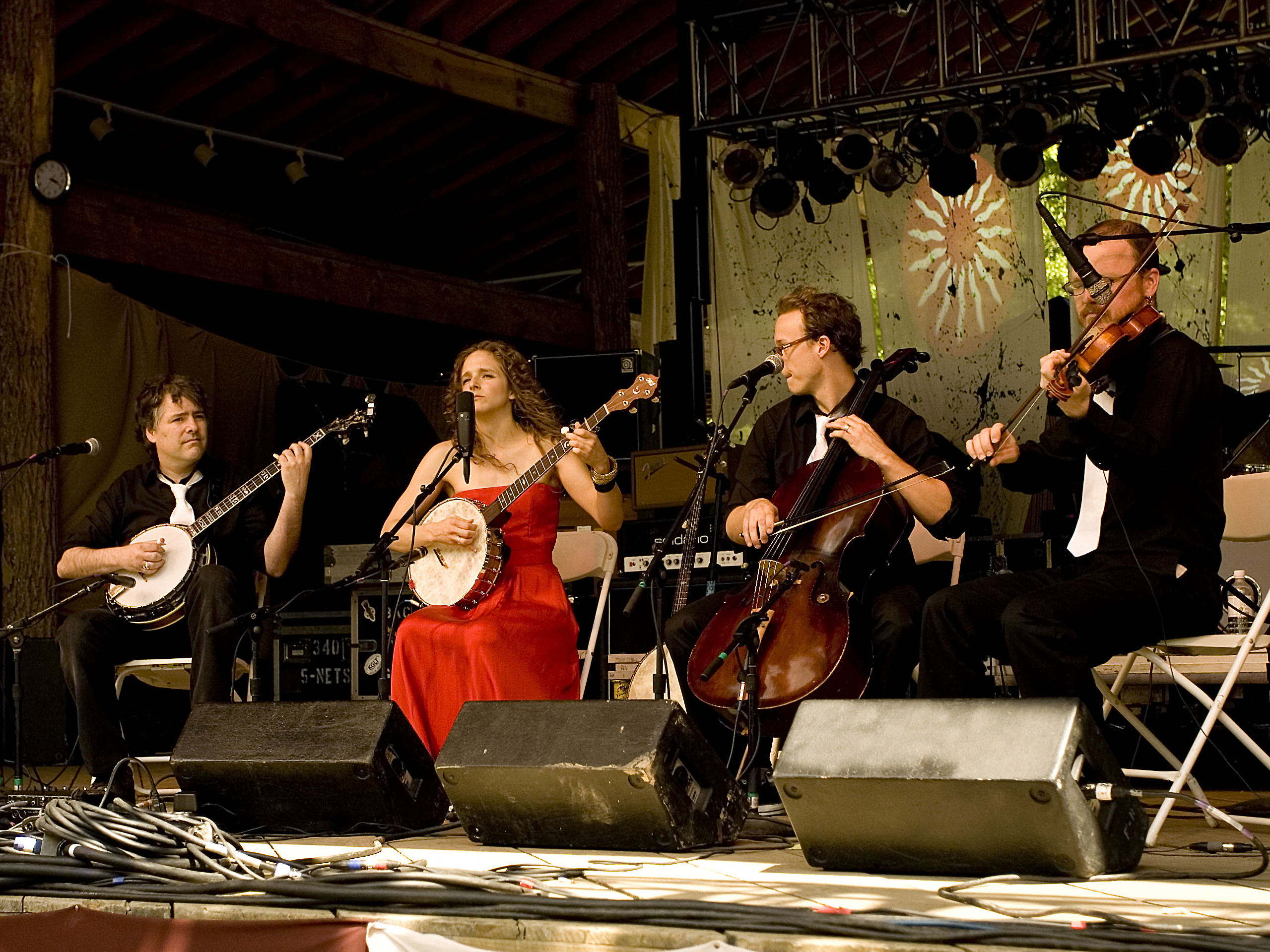
- Sparrow Quartet in Asheville, North Carolina, 2008

Background information
- Origin: United States
- Genres: Bluegrass; acoustic; old-time; Chinese
- Years active: 2005–present
- Label: Nettwerk
- Members: Abigail Washburn; Bela Fleck; Casey Driessen; Ben Sollee

Sparrow Quartet is an American acoustic music group that formed in 2005. Its members include Abigail Washburn (banjo and vocals), Béla Fleck (banjo), Casey Driessen (violin), and Ben Sollee (cello). The group is known for its mixture of old-time music with Chinese lyrics and melodies, owing to Washburn's long-standing interest in Chinese culture.

The band released their debut album, Abigail Washburn & The Sparrow Quartet, on May 20, 2008, on Nettwerk Records. Following the album's release, the Sparrow Quartet embarked on a one-hundred plus date tour of North America which included a stop in Seattle opening for Earl Scruggs in which Fleck performed onstage with Scruggs.

== Discography ==
- Abigail Washburn & The Sparrow Quartet (2008)
- The Sparrow Quartet EP (2009)
