= MerleFest =

Annual "traditional plus" music festival

Coordinates: 36.1333°N 81.1812°W

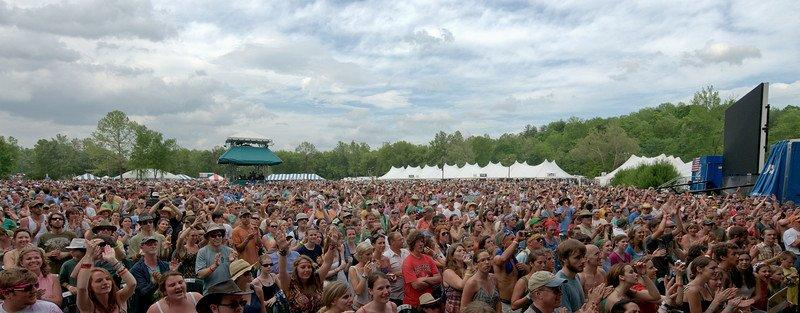
- Record-breaking crowd at MerleFest during Avett Brothers performance
- Genre: "Traditional plus"; bluegrass; folk; old-time; country; gospel; blues; Americana; rock; jam band; world music
- Dates: last weekend in April
- Locations: Wilkes Community College; Wilkesboro, North Carolina
- Years active: 1988 to present
- Founders: Doc Watson
- Website: merlefest.org

MerleFest is an annual "traditional plus" music festival held in Wilkesboro, North Carolina on the campus of Wilkes Community College. The festival, which is held the last weekend in April, was hosted by Grammy Award winner Doc Watson prior to his death and is named in memory and honor of his son, Eddy Merle Watson, who died in a farm tractor accident in 1985.

== History ==
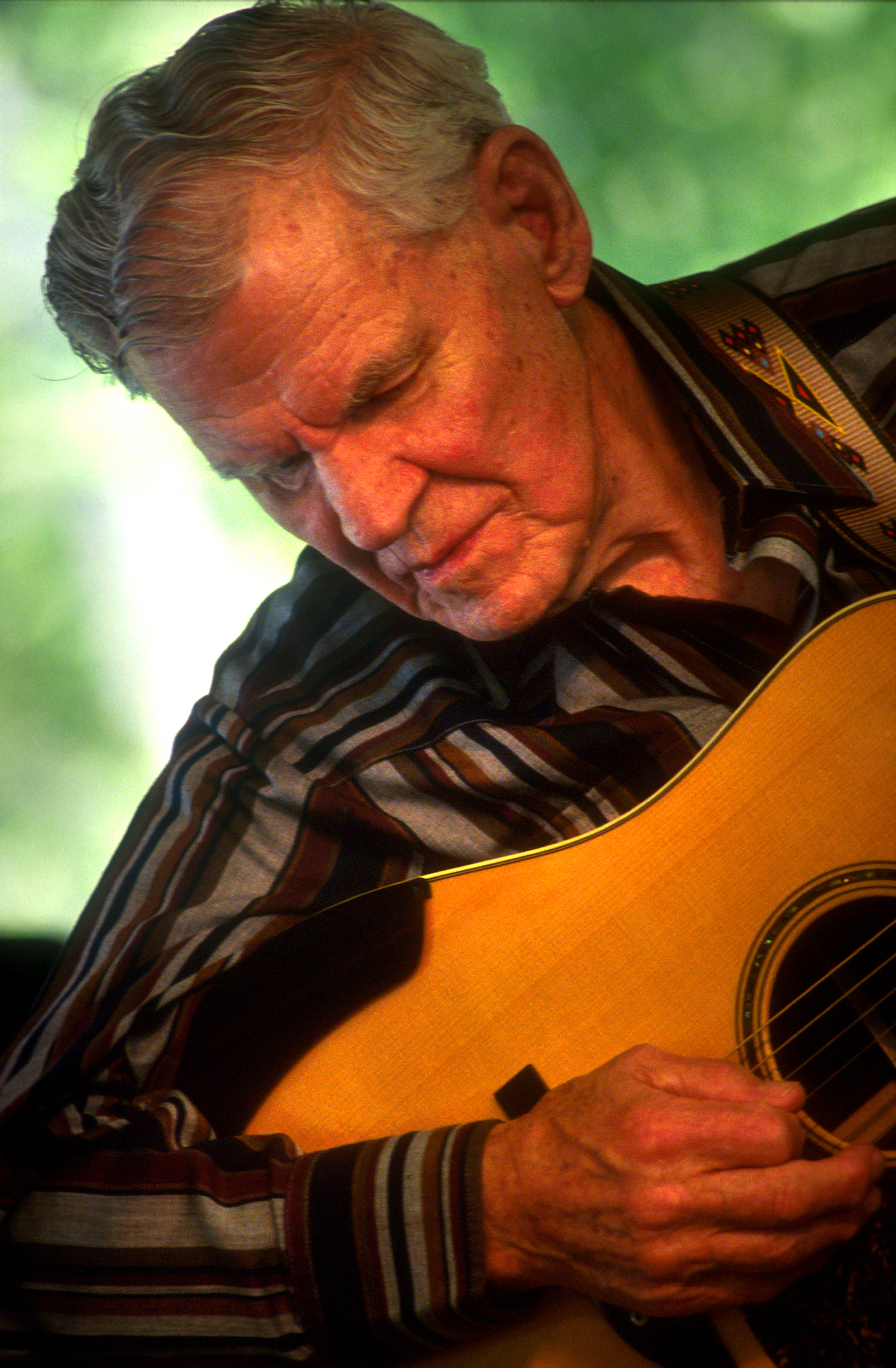
Doc Watson

Originally, the festival was an annual homecoming event in memory of Merle Watson. It is believed the festival got its name when a woman called asking for tickets to "Merlefest".

The festival, founded in 1988 by Doc Watson, is the primary fundraising event for Wilkes Community College and attracts crowds consistently exceeding 75,000 in number, making it one of the largest music festivals in the United States. It is estimated that the festival brings over $10 million in business and tourist revenue to Wilkes County and surrounding areas each year.

The music is spread across 13 different stages and four days, which provides festival visitors with a wide variety of musical venues, groups, and styles to choose from. MerleFest offers a mix of traditional and contemporary roots music, a music blend that Doc himself named "traditional plus." It brings together Bluegrass, contemporary acoustic, blues, folk, old-time music, Cajun, jazz, country, Celtic, Americana, rock and singer-songwriter music. Artists can often be enjoyed in on-stage jam sessions featuring unusual combinations of musicians, such as Bob Weir, formerly of the Grateful Dead singing with Sam Bush and Gillian Welch with the Waybacks.

Other artists who have performed on MerleFest's 14 stages over 27 years have included Dolly Parton, Willie Nelson, Earl Scruggs, The Kruger Brothers, Carolina Chocolate Drops, John Prine, Alison Krauss and Union Station, Donna the Buffalo, Natalie MacMaster, Vassar Clements, Hot Tuna, Alan Jackson, Darius Rucker, David Grisman, Ricky Skaggs, Emmylou Harris, Jerry Douglas, Del McCoury, Billy Strings, Junior Brown, Mary Chapin Carpenter, Claire Lynch, Elvis Costello, Howard Armstrong, Randy Travis, Lyle Lovett, The Doobie Brothers, Robert Plant and the Band of Joy, Sharon Gilchrist, The Avett Brothers, Tony Rice, François Vola, Old Crow Medicine Show, Steve Martin and the Steep Canyon Rangers, Zac Brown Band, Dierks Bentley, Linda Ronstadt, Levon Helm, Taj Mahal, Bruce Hornsby, Cadillac Sky, Vince Gill, Little Feat, and Bonnie Raitt

== See also ==
- List of bluegrass music festivals
- List of country music festivals
- List of folk festivals
