= Davide Salvado =

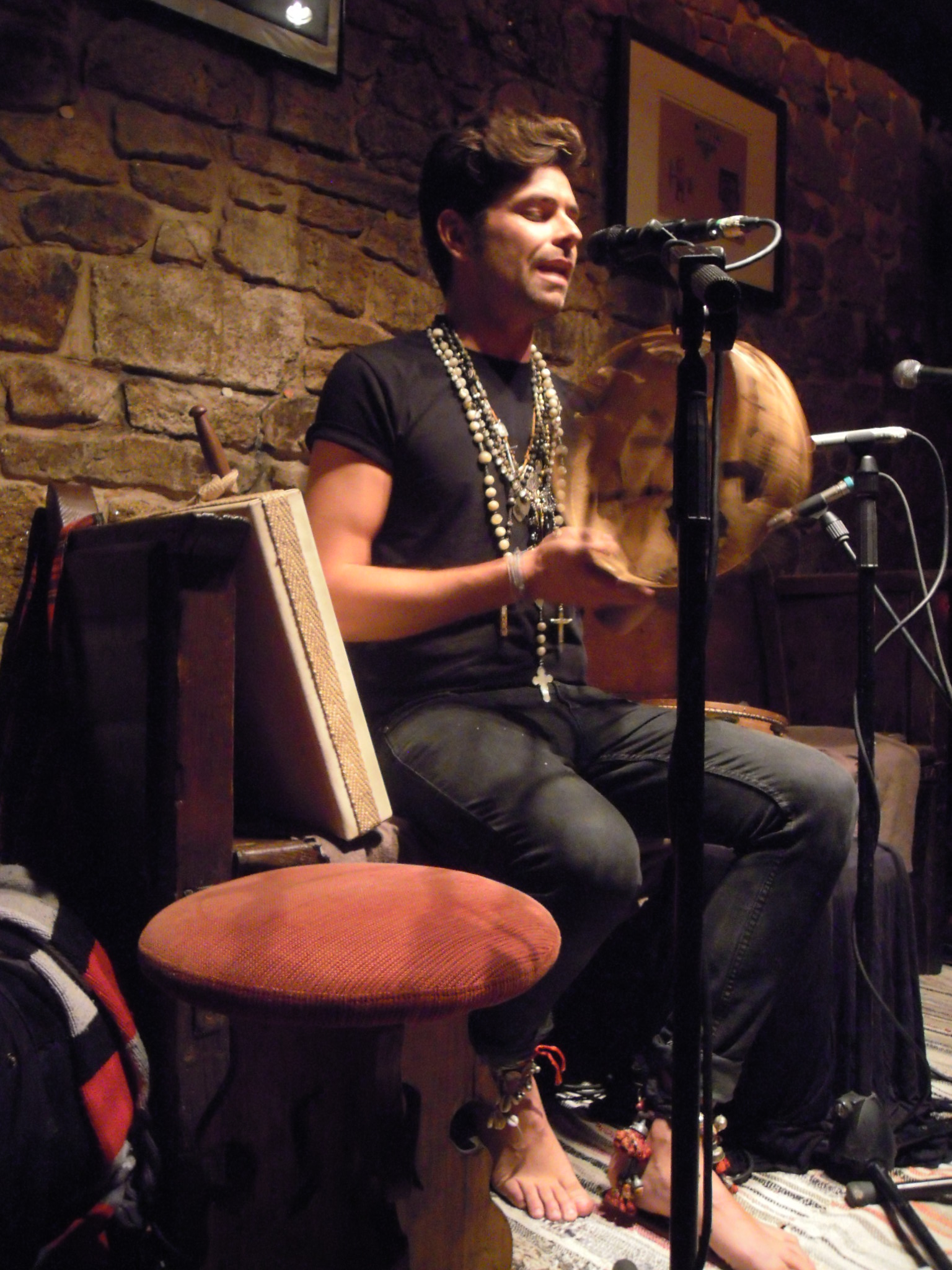
- Davide Salvado, 2012

Background information
- Born: July 24, 1981 (age 44); Marín, Galicia
- Origin: Spain
- Genres: Traditional music of Galicia; World music
- Occupation: Singer
- Instruments: Vocals; Tambourine
- Website: Davide Salvado on facebook

Davide Salvado is a Galician Traditional music and World music singer from Galicia, Spain. He performed at World Music Expo 2014 in a trio with accordionist Santi Cribeiro and Cristian Silva on pipes and percussion.

== Biography ==
He is self-taught and has travelled all over Galicia to collect traditional music. In 2004, he joined the Ecléctica Ensemble group, together with Ugía Pedreira, Ramón Pinheiro and Richard Rivera. Shortly after, he joined Xosé Manuel Budiño's band as a singer and percussionist, with whom he toured half of the world. He is a singer in Banda das Crechas.

He has been part of Pepa Yáñez's Cabaret d'Aquí company, which has performed shows such as Unha noite no muíño non é nada or O negro vai con todo, together with Nacho Muñoz. In the world of theatre, he has participated in the play As Dunas, from the Galician Drama Centre, and in the musical Dillei by Carlos Blanco.

He has received the Martín Códax award in the traditional Galician music category in 2014 and 2017.

== Discography ==
- Árnica Pura (2011)
- Rústica (2015)
- Lobos (2015)

== See also ==
- Music of Galicia, Cantabria and Asturias
