= Laura Cortese =

American singer, songwriter, and fiddler

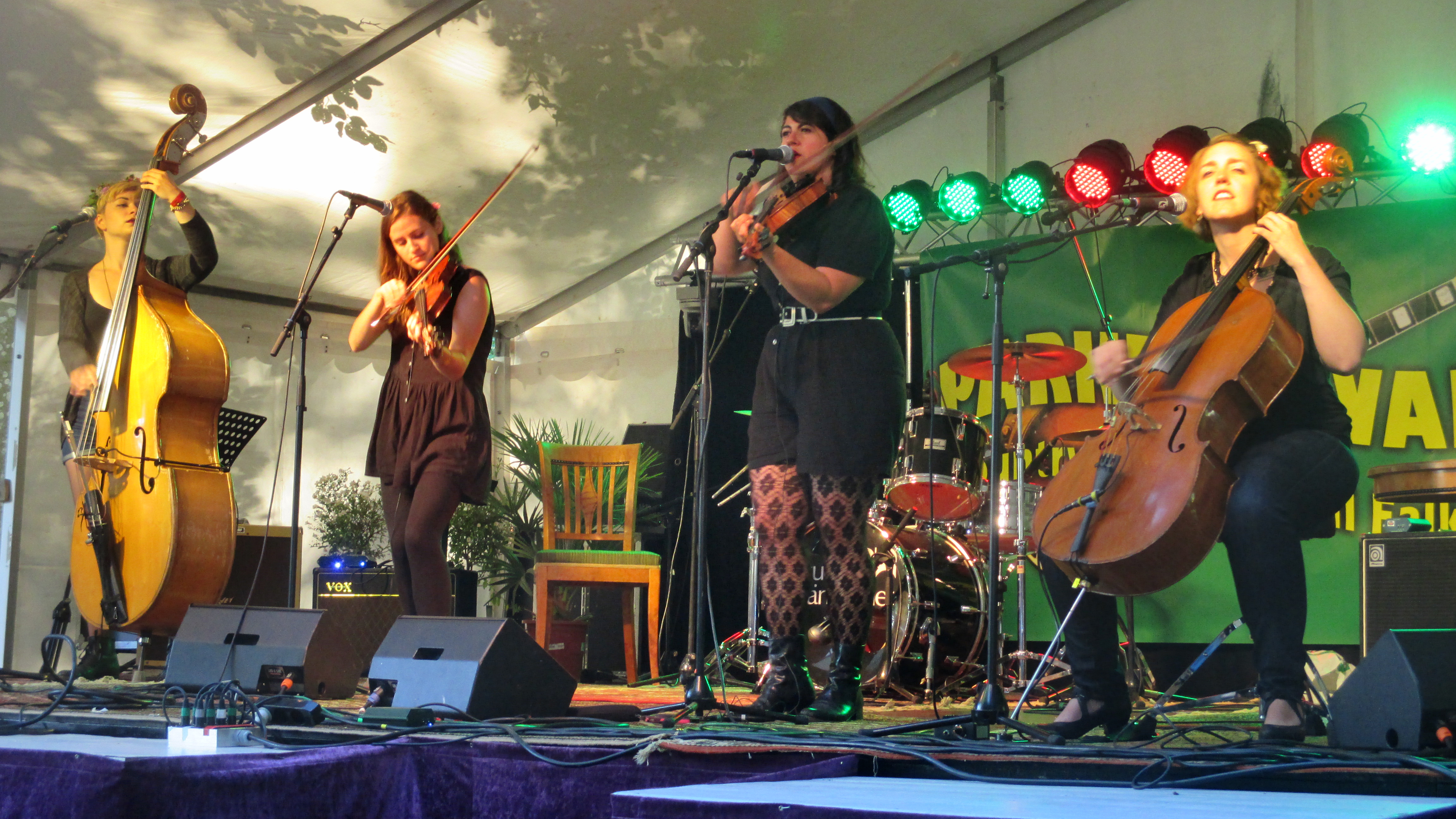
- Laura Cortese & The Dance Cards on Swedish tour 2015.

Background information
- Origin: San Francisco, California
- Instruments: Vocals, fiddle

Laura Cortese is an American singer, songwriter, and fiddler. She was born in San Francisco and attended Berklee College of Music in Boston. Cortese lives in Ghent, Belgium with her partner, Belgian accordionist, Bert Ruymbeek and their two children.

Cortese regularly performs solo, but usually with her band Laura Cortese and the Dance Cards (with Valerie Thompson, Sumaia Jackson, Zoe Guigueno, Jenna Moynihan, D. James Goodwin, Sam Kassirer and Jeni Magaña) with which she released two albums, the first of which was California Calling which debuted in 2017. She has also performed with Tao Rodríguez-Seeger in the Anarchist Orchestra, and with Hanneke Cassel and Lissa Schneckenburger in Halali. In the past she has played with acts including Uncle Earl, Band of Horses and Pete Seeger. She is also a co-founder of the Boston Celtic Music Festival.

== Laura Cortese and the Dance Cards ==
- Bitter Better (2020)
- California Calling (2017)

== Solo albums and collaborations ==
- All in Always (2016)
- Into the Dark (2013)
- Acoustic Project (2010)
- Bad Year: Single (2008)
- Blow the Candle Out (2007)
- Even the Lost Creek (2006)
- Hush (2004)
