= KC Groves =

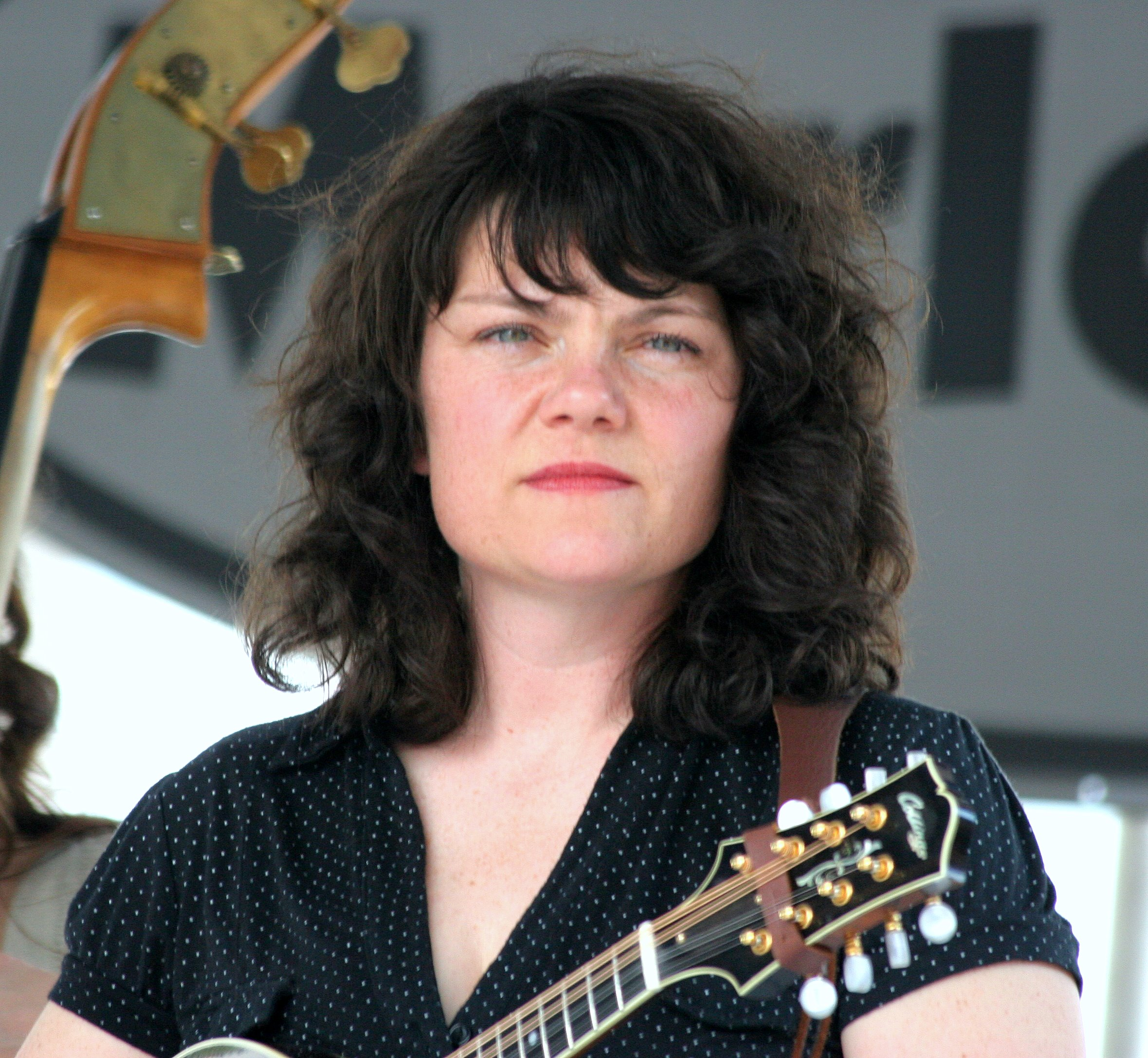
- KC Groves performing at MerleFest, 2007

Background information
- Born: 14 March 1971 (age 55)
- Origin: Dearborn, Michigan
- Genres: Americana; Bluegrass
- Instruments: Mandolin, Guitar, Vocals
- Website: KC Groves' website

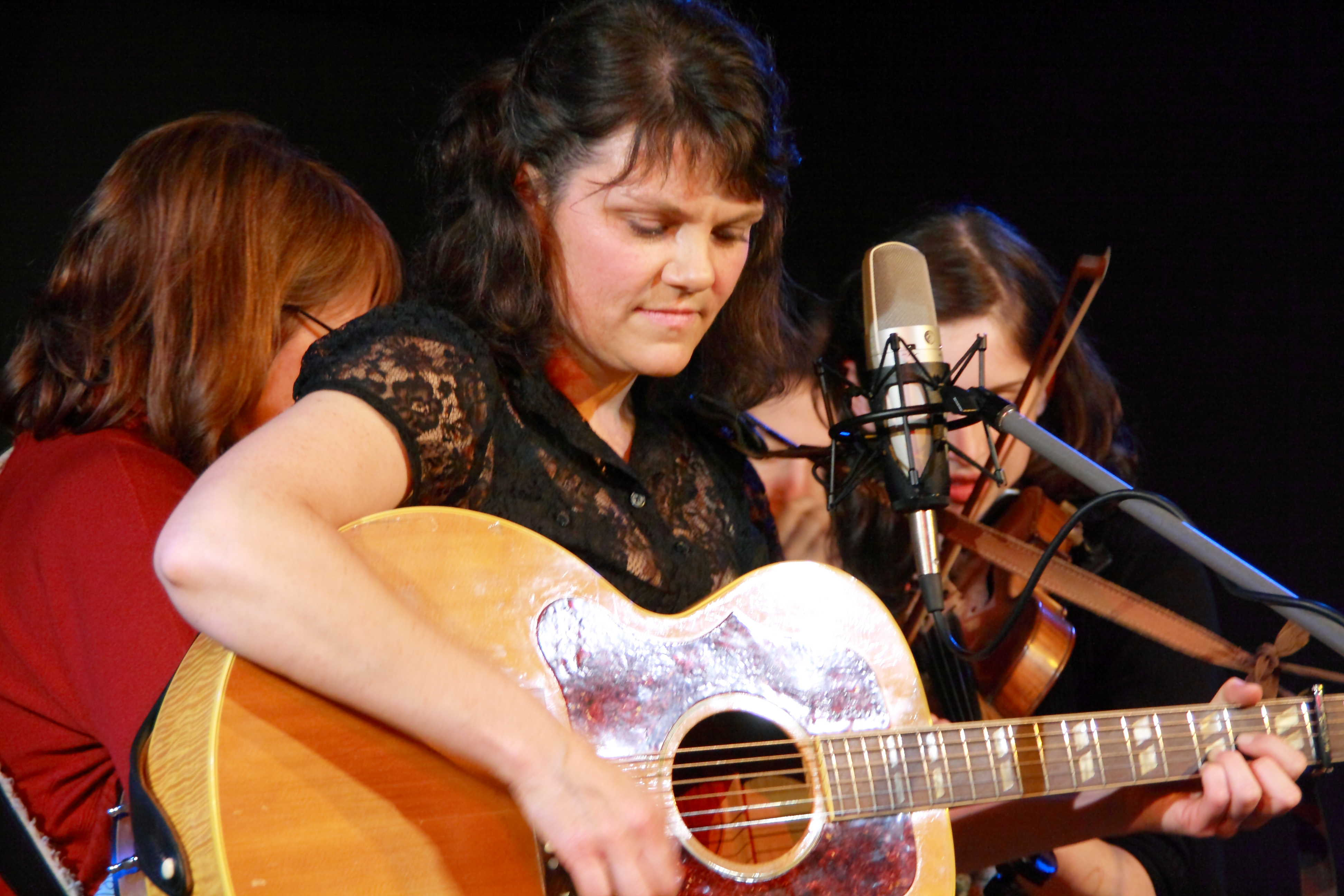
KC Groves with Uncle Earl at Kult, Niederstetten, 2010

Katherine "KC" Groves (born 14 March 1971) is an American mandolin player and singer specializing in old-time music and bluegrass. She grew up in Dearborn, Michigan and lives now in Lyons, Colorado. Coming from a musical family, her father is a singer and a country yodeler, she had piano lessons at the age of six, though she hated them.

== Life and career ==
In the early 1990s she began playing guitar, writing songs, and learning mandolin. Groves established herself in the Ann Arbor / Detroit alternative music scene. In 1999, she released her first CD, Can You Hear It, produced by Charles Sawtelle, and won the Detroit Music Award for Best Bluegrass Artist / Group. KC liked piano enough to play jazz gigs on the weekends while attending UM and played with the band Tomcat. In addition, she painted the mural on the iconic local party store: The Blue Front. Prior to 1999 She released 2 CDs in the Ann Arbor/ Ypsilanti area. The Uncle Earl Album was produced by John Paul Jones of Led Zeppelin. Together with Jo Serrapere she founded the old-time music band Uncle Earl.

Her second solo CD, Something Familiar was released in 2004.

== Discography ==
=== Can You Hear It ===
1999 (One Man Clapping Records)

1. Can You Hear It?/Lost Indian
2. Peach Pie
3. New Mexico
4. Little Sky
5. You Think We're Friends
6. Pony Days
7. When the Wind Blows Free
8. Hold On
9. Weedin' Onions
10. I'll Take You in My Arms
11. Bad Boy Blues
12. And the World Turns Around

=== Something Familiar ===
2004 (KC Groves)

1. Snapshots of a Life
2. Thinking in Terms
3. Denver to Telluride
4. Heidi
5. Soft Complaint
6. Something That Happens
7. Keep on Lookin'
8. Just Like the Snow
9. Song in My Heart
10. What Went Wrong
11. St. Vrain Waltz
