= The Mammals =

American contemporary folk rock band

- The Mammals play Woodstock

Background information
- Genres: Folk, folk rock, old-time, Americana, roots music
- Instruments: banjo, fiddle, guitar, bass, drums
- Years active: 2001–2008; 2017–present
- Labels: Signature Sounds, Thirty Tigers, Humble Abode Music
- Members: Mike Merenda; Ruth Ungar; Konrad Meissner; Jacob Silver; Ken Maiuri; Will Bryant; Brandon Morrison; Charlie Rose; Rob Stein
- Past members: Tao Rodríguez-Seeger; Chris Merenda; Alicia Jo Rabins; Pierce Woodward; Dango Rose
- Website: Official Website

The Mammals are a contemporary folk rock band based in the Hudson Valley area of New York, in the United States.

The band tours internationally and consists of founding members and principal songwriters Mike Merenda (guitar, banjo) and Ruth Ungar (fiddle, guitar) plus Konrad Meissner (drums) and a rotating cast of players on bass, organ, and pedal steel.

The Mammals sing and play in a style heavily influenced by traditional folk, soul, old-time, blues, Cajun, Celtic and rock and roll. Their lyrics sometimes address political and environmental concerns; topics such as war, social justice, and sustainability. Ungar is the daughter of fiddler and composer Jay Ungar, who is best known for his composition Ashokan Farewell which the band also performs.

== Band history ==
Merenda, Ungar and Tao Rodríguez-Seeger formed The Mammals in 2001. Initially a quartet with Alicia Jo Rabins on the fiddle^{[2]} they quickly shifted to a trio with Ungar as the sole fiddler. In 2004, they became a quintet adding drummer Ken Maiuri and bassist Pierce Woodward. Chris Merenda, brother to Mike, joined the band in 2004 replacing Maiuri on the drums. Woodward left in 2005, replaced by Dango Rose and subsequently Jacob Silver on bass.

In 2002 and 2005, they performed as part of Arlo Guthrie's annual holiday concert at Carnegie Hall. In 2005, a performance of their song The Bush Boys caused The Mammals to be censored at a Lafayette, LA festival venue.

Between 2001 and 2007, The Mammals collaborated on stage with their peers Sarah Lee Guthrie & Johnny Irion, Crooked Still, Foghorn Stringband, Uncle Earl, Nickel Creek, and The Duhks; and with their mentors Jay Ungar and Molly Mason, Arlo Guthrie, Pete Seeger, Mike Seeger, Odetta, and Utah Phillips.

In 2008, The Mammals took a hiatus to pursue other musical endeavors.

In 2017, the band re-emerged with the release of the video On My Way Home (Feb 2017) and the single Culture War (March 2017.)

In October 2017, The Mammals began soliciting support from their fans on the crowdfunding platform Patreon.

In April 2018, they released the full album Sunshiner recorded at the band's home studio Humble Abode Music with co-producer Adam Armstrong. The title track, a nod to alternative energy, was one of The Americana Music Association's "Top 100 Albums and Songs for 2018" and was nominated by the International Folk Music Awards for “2018 Song of the Year.” The album also featured the environmentally themed a capella ballad My Baby Drinks Water.

In December 2018, they announced the release of five new singles, donating 100% of download proceeds to specific causes relating to each song.

== Performances ==
The Mammals have performed nationally across the USA, and internationally in Canada, Australia, Denmark, and the UK.

In 2007 they appeared at the National Folk Festival in Canberra, Australia and the Tønder Festival in Tønder, Denmark. In 2017-18 they performed at Grey Fox Bluegrass Festival, Green River Festival, Clearwater Festival, Wintergrass Festival in Bellvue, WA, and the FreshGrass Festival at Mass MOCA. In 2019 they are scheduled to perform at the Suwannee Spring Reunion in Live Oak, FL and the Four Corners Folk Festival in Pagosa Springs, CO. They have performed multiple times at Levon Helm Studios in Woodstock, NY and regularly perform at the Winter Hoot and Summer Hoot folk music festivals, which have been produced by Merenda and Ungar bi-annually at the Ashokan Center in Olivebridge, NY since 2013.

== Side projects ==
In 2006, Rodríguez-Seeger recorded the album Que Vaya Bien with Roy Brown, Puerto Rican folk singer; and Tito Auger, lead singer for Puerto Rican rock group Fiel A La Vega. In collaboration with Jacob Silver, Laura Cortese and Robin McMillan, Rodríguez-Seeger released an EP as The Anarchist Orchestra in 2007 and the full-length album Rise and Bloom as Tao Seeger Band in 2010. The group performed that summer at the Newport Folk Festival.

In 2008, Merenda and Ungar began touring as Mike + Ruthy to support their duo recordings.

Ungar also recorded and performed in the bands Sometymes Why (2005-2009) and the Wayfaring Strangers (2001-2009).)

Merenda occasionally performs solo under his own name or the moniker Ruthless Mike.

== Discography ==
They have released seven albums, two EPs, and are featured on the Wheatland Music Festival compilation, ...At This Stage.:

- Born Live (2001)
- Evolver (2002)
- Migration (EP) (2004)
- Rock That Babe (2004)
- ...At This Stage (various artists) (2004)
- Departure (2006)
- Bootleg Six-Pack (EP) (2007)
- Sunshiner (2018)
- Nonet (2020)
- Touch Grass, Vols. I & II (2025)
