= Ashokan Farewell =

1982 song written by Jay Ungar

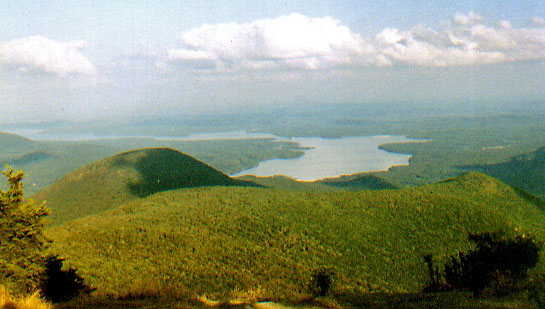
The Ashokan Reservoir, located in Ulster County, New York, United States

Ashokan Farewell
24-second sample from the soundtrack from The Civil War

"Ashokan Farewell" /əˈʃoʊˌkæn/ is a song composed by American folk musician Jay Ungar in 1982. For many years, it served as a goodnight or farewell waltz at the annual Ashokan Fiddle & Dance Camps, run by Ungar and his wife Molly Mason, who named the tune after the Ashokan Field Campus (now the Ashokan Center) of SUNY New Paltz in Upstate New York.

The tune was used as the title theme of the 1990 PBS television documentary series The Civil War. Despite its late date of composition, it was included in the 1991 compilation album Songs of the Civil War.

== Background ==
The piece is a waltz in D major, composed in the style of a Scottish lament (e.g., Niel Gow's "Lament for His Second Wife"). Jay Ungar describes the song as coming out of "a sense of loss and longing" after the annual Ashokan Music & Dance Camps ended. The most famous arrangement of the piece begins with a solo violin, later accompanied by guitar and upright bass. Another arrangement, featuring Ungar, Mason, and their family band, is performed with two violins, an acoustic guitar, and a banjo, with the piece beginning with a solo violin.

Before its use as the television series theme, "Ashokan Farewell" was recorded on Waltz of the Wind, the second album by the band Fiddle Fever. The musicians included Ungar and Mason. Ashokan was the name of a former village in the Catskill region that is now mostly covered by the Ashokan Reservoir.

== Use in The Civil War documentary series ==
In 1984, filmmaker Ken Burns heard "Ashokan Farewell" and was moved by it. He used it in two of his documentary films: Huey Long (1985), and The Civil War (1990), which features the original recording by Fiddle Fever in the beginning of the film. The Civil War drew the greatest attention to the piece. It is played 25 times throughout the eleven-hour series, including during the emotional reading of Sullivan Ballou's letter to his wife in the first episode; during another playing, its climactic fermata is timed to coincide with the reveal of the number of casualties from the conflict - the most of any in American history. The tune underlies nearly an hour of film. Viewers of The Civil War frequently believe the melody is a traditional tune from the Civil War era; in fact, it is the only modern composition on the film's soundtrack, as all other music is authentic 19th-century music.

In the wake of the success of the series and its soundtrack album, the track was released as a single by Elektra Nonesuch, backed with the "Sullivan Ballou Letter" recording featuring narrator David McCullough and actor Paul Roebling reading the part of Ballou. It subsequently received airtime on some country music-formatted radio stations, which was timely as the United States entered Operation Desert Storm. Elektra Nonesuch director of media relations Carol Yaple told Billboard magazine, "I think ['Ashokan Farewell'] was the theme that people could sort of attach the series identity to. However... [the series' music] is really all of the period. There's nothing sexy or contemporary about it, really, except that it was attached to that series and is good music, certainly."

The tune was later used in the Louie episode "The Road: Part II", where Louie dresses up in a Civil War uniform for an old-time photograph.

The tune is used in the 2018 premiere and 2024 Season 5 finale of the television series Yellowstone.

== Other versions ==
The tune has been covered and rerecorded numerous times:

- 1993 – Fiddler Mark O'Connor released Heroes, containing an "Ashokan Farewell" duet with Pinchas Zukerman.
- 1994 – Bluegrass guitarist Tony Rice covered it on his release Live.
- 1994 – Priscilla Herdman also released it on Forever and Always, with lyrics by Grian Mac Gregor. Both Ungar and Mason accompanied her.
- 1997 – James Galway and Phil Coulter, featuring James Galway on the flute.
- 2001 – A cover version appears on Chuck Leavell's solo piano recording Forever Blue.
- 2005 – The all-female Irish musical ensemble Celtic Woman released a cover version by Máiréad Nesbitt (violin/fiddle) in their first album and live DVD recording of the same name.
- 2006 – Time for Three covered it on We Just Burned this for You, recorded live at Bowling Green State University in Ohio on January 13.
- 2011 – Keith Kenniff, under his pseudonym Goldmund, covered the song on his album All Will Prosper.
- 2013 – Performed by solo violinist Major John Perkins of The Band of Her Majesty's Royal Marines was voted no. 36 in Classic FM's (UK) Hall of Fame.
- 2017 – The American Heritage Lyceum Philharmonic recorded the tune for their album Simple Gifts
- 2020 – A medley of the hymn Softly And Tenderly along with Ashokan Farewell was recorded by Keith and Kristyn Getty with Vince Gill, Sierra Hull, Ellie Holcomb, and Deborah Klemme, and appears on the Gettys’ album Evensong: Hymns and Lullabies at the Close of Day.

== See also ==
- Music history of the United States during the Civil War era
