= Sullivan Ballou =

Union Army officer

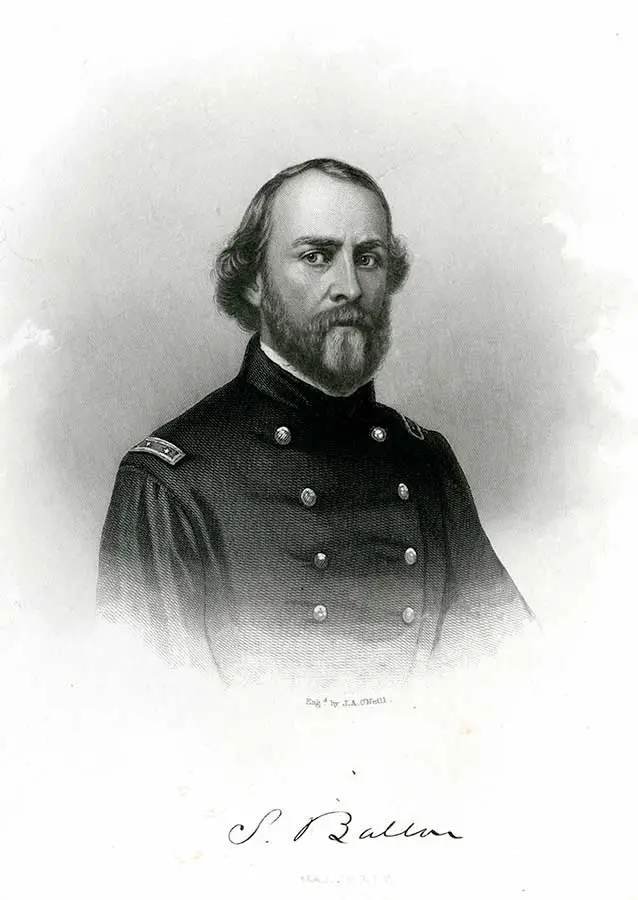
- Lithograph of Sullivan Ballou

Member of the Rhode Island House of Representatives
- In office 1853–1857

Personal details
- Born: March 28, 1829 Smithfield, Rhode Island, U.S.
- Died: July 29, 1861 (aged 32) Sudley Church, Virginia
- Resting place: Swan Point Cemetery, Providence, Rhode Island
- Spouse: Sarah Hart Shumway (m. 1855)
- Children: 2

Military service
- Allegiance: United States
- Branch/service: United States Army
- Years of service: 1861
- Rank: Major
- Commands: 2nd Rhode Island Infantry
- Battles/wars: American Civil War; First Battle of Bull Run (DOW)

Sullivan Ballou (March 28, 1829 – July 29, 1861) was an American lawyer and politician from Rhode Island who served as a Union Army officer during the American Civil War. He is remembered for an eloquent letter he wrote to his wife Sarah a week before he was mortally wounded in the First Battle of Bull Run.

== Early life ==
Ballou was born the son of Hiram (1802–1833) and Emeline (Bowen) Ballou, a distinguished Huguenot family in Smithfield, Rhode Island. He lost his father at a young age. In spite of this, he attended boarding school at Phillips Academy in Andover, Massachusetts. After graduation from Phillips, he attended Brown University, where he was a member of Delta Phi, and went on to study law at the National Law School, in Ballston, New York. He was admitted to the bar in Rhode Island and began practice in 1853.

Ballou married Sarah Hart Shumway on October 15, 1855. They had two sons, Edgar and William.

He was active in public affairs and was elected to the Rhode Island House of Representatives, serving from 1853 to 1857. He was chosen as Clerk of the House, and later as the Speaker. He was a staunch Republican and supporter of Abraham Lincoln.

== Civil War ==
After the bombardment of Fort Sumter in April 1861, President Lincoln called on the States loyal to the Union to provide 75,000 militia troops. Ballou promptly volunteered, and encouraged others to do the same. He was commissioned a major in the 2nd Rhode Island Infantry Regiment. He was third in command of the Regiment, after Colonel John Slocum and Lieutenant Colonel Frank Wheaton. He was also appointed judge advocate of the Rhode Island militia.

After training at Camp Clark in Washington D.C., the 2nd Rhode Island had joined the Union Army of Northeastern Virginia by July 1861. On July 21, the regiment took part in the First Battle of Bull Run, which was the first major battle of the American Civil War. The 2nd Rhode Island Infantry were in the Second Brigade under the command of Colonel Ambrose Burnside and were part of the Second Division in the Union Army of Northeastern Virginia.

=== Death ===
During a Confederate attack at Bull Run, Ballou was hit by a six-pounder cannonball which tore off part of his right leg and killed his horse. He was carried off the field, and the remainder of his leg was amputated in a makeshift hospital at Sudley Church, Manassas. However, after the Union Army was defeated in battle and forced to retreat back to Washington, Ballou and the other wounded were left behind.

Ballou died from his injuries a week later and was buried in Sudley Church's graveyard. He was one of 94 men of the 2nd Rhode Island killed or mortally wounded at Bull Run. He was 32 at the time of his death; his wife Sarah was 24.

The battle area was occupied by Confederate forces, and Ballou's body was allegedly exhumed, decapitated, and burned by Confederate troops; his body was never recovered. In place of his body, some charred ash and bone from Sudley were reburied in Swan Point Cemetery in Providence, Rhode Island.

Sarah Ballou never remarried. She later moved to New Jersey to live with her son, William. She died aged 82 in 1917; she is buried next to her husband.

== Letter ==
Ballou's now-famous letter to his 24-year-old wife, Sarah, was written on the eve of the Civil War.

Headquarters, Camp Clark

Washington, D.C., July 14, 1861

My Very Dear Wife:

Indications are very strong that we shall move in a few days, perhaps to-morrow. Lest I should not be able to write you again, I feel impelled to write a few lines, that may fall under your eye when I shall be no more.

Our movement may be one of a few days duration and full of pleasure and it may be one of severe conflict and death to me. Not my will, but thine, O God be done. If it is necessary that I should fall on the battle-field for any country, I am ready. I have no misgivings about, or lack of confidence in, the cause in which I am engaged, and my courage does not halt or falter. I know how strongly American civilization now leans upon the triumph of government, and how great a debt we owe to those who went before us through the blood and suffering of the Revolution, and I am willing, perfectly willing to lay down all my joys in this life to help maintain this government, and to pay that debt.

But, my dear wife, when I know, that with my own joys, I lay down nearly all of yours, and replace them in this life with care and sorrows, when, after having eaten for long years the bitter fruit of orphanage myself, I must offer it, as their only sustenance, to my dear little children, is it weak or dishonorable, while the banner of my purpose floats calmly and proudly in the breeze, that my unbounded love for you, my darling wife and children, should struggle in fierce, though useless, contest with my love of country.

I cannot describe to you my feelings on this calm summer night, when two thousand men are sleeping around me, many of them enjoying the last, perhaps, before that of death, and I, suspicious that Death is creeping behind me with his fatal dart, am communing with God, my country and thee.

I have sought most closely and diligently, and often in my breast, for a wrong motive in this hazarding the happiness of those I loved, and I could not find one. A pure love of my country, and of the principles I have often advocated before the people, and "the name of honor, that I love more than I fear death," have called upon me, and I have obeyed. Sarah, my love for you is deathless. It seems to bind me with mighty cables, that nothing but Omnipotence can break; and yet, my love of country comes over me like a strong wind, and bears me irresistibly on with all those chains, to the battlefield. The memories of all the blissful moments I have spent with you come crowding over me, and I feel most deeply grateful to God and you, that I have enjoyed them so long. And how hard it is for me to give them up, and burn to ashes the hopes of future years, when, God willing, we might still have lived and loved together, and seen our boys grow up to honorable manhood around us.

I know I have but few claims upon Divine Providence, but something whispers to me, perhaps it is the wafted prayer of my little Edgar, that I shall return to my loved ones unharmed. If I do not, my dear Sarah, never forget how much I love you, nor that, when my last breath escapes me on the battle-field, it will whisper your name.

Forgive my many faults, and the many pains I have caused you. How thoughtless, how foolish I have oftentimes been! How gladly would I wash out with my tears, every little spot upon your happiness, and struggle with all the misfortune of this world, to shield you and my children from harm. But I cannot, I must watch you from the spirit land and hover near you, while you buffet the storms with your precious little freight, and wait with sad patience till we meet to part no more.

But, O Sarah, if the dead can come back to this earth, and flit unseen around those they loved, I shall always be near you in the garish day, and the darkest night amidst your happiest scenes and gloomiest hours always, always, and, if the soft breeze fans your cheek, it shall be my breath; or the cool air cools your throbbing temples, it shall be my spirit passing by. Sarah, do not mourn me dear; think I am gone, and wait for me, for we shall meet again.

As for my little boys, they will grow as I have done, and never know a father's love and care. Little Willie is too young to remember me long, and my blue-eyed Edgar will keep my frolics with him among the dimmest memories of his childhood. Sarah, I have unlimited confidence in your maternal care, and your development of their characters. Tell my two mothers, I call God's blessing upon them. O Sarah, I wait for you there! Come to me, and lead thither my children.

- Sullivan

The letter was said to have been found in Ballou's trunk after he died. It was reclaimed and personally delivered to Ballou's widow by the Governor of Rhode Island, William Sprague, after the governor had personally gone to Virginia a year later to reclaim effects of dead Rhode Island soldiers.

=== Media ===
The letter was featured prominently in Ken Burns' 1990 award-winning documentary The Civil War, where an abridged version was read by Paul Roebling in a pairing with Jay Ungar's musical piece "Ashokan Farewell".

The letter is the inspiration for the song "Sarah" in Frank Wildhorn's musical The Civil War.

The letter is also the inspiration for the song "Dearest Sarah" by the band Goodnight, Texas.

John Kander set selections from the letter in his song “A Letter from Sullivan Ballou.”

The letter was the inspiration for the World of Warcraft quest "Sully Balloo's Letter" for the Alliance faction. The letter must be delivered to Balloo's widow, Sara Balloo.
