= The Civil War (miniseries) =

1990 documentary film series by Ken Burns

- A side portion of the 1991 VHS box set of nine volumes
- Genre: Documentary
- Written by: Geoffrey C. Ward; Ric Burns
- Directed by: Ken Burns
- Voices of: Sam Waterston; Jason Robards; Julie Harris; Morgan Freeman; Arthur Miller; George Plimpton; Paul Roebling; Garrison Keillor; George Black; Christopher Murney; Charley McDowell; Shelby Foote; Philip Bosco; Terry Courier; Jody Powell; Studs Terkel
- Narrated by: David McCullough
- Country of origin: United States
- Original language: English
- No. of seasons: 1
- No. of episodes: 9

Production
- Producers: Ken Burns; Ric Burns
- Cinematography: Ken Burns; Allen Moore; Buddy Squires
- Editors: Paul Barnes; Bruce Shaw; Tricia Reidy
- Running time: 690 minutes/11 hours 30 minutes (9 episodes)
- Production companies: Kenneth Lauren Burns Productions (Florentine Films), WETA-TV

Original release
- Network: PBS
- Release: September 23 – September 27, 1990

The Civil War is a 1990 American television documentary miniseries created by Ken Burns about the American Civil War. It was the first broadcast to air on PBS for five consecutive nights, from September 23 to 27, 1990.

More than 39 million viewers tuned in to at least one episode, and viewership averaged more than 14 million viewers each evening, making it the most-watched program ever to air on PBS. It was awarded more than 40 major television and film honors. A companion book to the documentary was released shortly after the series aired.

The film's production techniques were groundbreaking for the time, and spawned film techniques such as the Ken Burns effect. Its theme song, "Ashokan Farewell" is widely acclaimed. The series was extremely influential, and serves as the main source of knowledge about the Civil War to many Americans. However, some historians have criticized the film for its narrow focus on the battles of the war, for presenting the Lost Cause views of Shelby Foote, and for not delving into the subsequent, racially contentious Reconstruction era.

The series was rebroadcast in June 1994 as a lead-up to Burns's next series Baseball, then remastered for its 12th anniversary in 2002, although it remained in standard definition resolution. To commemorate the film's 25th anniversary and the 150th anniversary of the end of the Civil War and Lincoln's assassination, the film underwent a complete digital restoration to high-definition format in 2015.

== Production ==
Mathew Brady's photographs inspired Burns to make The Civil War, which (in nine episodes totaling more than 10 hours) explores the war's military, social, and political facets through some 16,000 contemporary photographs and paintings, and excerpts from the letters and journals of persons famous and obscure.

The series' slow zooming and panning across still images was later termed the "Ken Burns effect". Burns combined these images with modern cinematography, music, narration by David McCullough, anecdotes and insights from authors such as Shelby Foote, historians Barbara J. Fields, Ed Bearss, and Stephen B. Oates; and actors reading contemporary quotes from historical figures such as Abraham Lincoln, Robert E. Lee, Ulysses S. Grant, Walt Whitman, Stonewall Jackson, and Frederick Douglass, as well as diaries by Mary Boykin Chesnut, Samuel R. Watkins, Elisha Hunt Rhodes and George Templeton Strong and commentary from James W. Symington. A large cast of actors voiced correspondence, memoirs, news articles, and stood in for historical figures from the Civil War.

Burns also interviewed Daisy Turner, then a 104-year-old daughter of an ex-slave, whose poetry features prominently in the series. Turner died in February 1988, two-and-a-half years before the series aired.

Production ran five years. The film was co-produced by Ken's brother Ric Burns, written by Geoffrey C. Ward and Ric Burns with Ken Burns, and edited by Paul Barnes with cinematography by Buddy Squires. It was funded by General Motors, the National Endowment for the Humanities, the Corporation for Public Broadcasting, the Arthur Vining Davis Foundations, and the John D. & Catherine T. MacArthur Foundation.

=== Music ===
The theme song of the documentary is the instrumental "Ashokan Farewell", which is heard twenty-five times during the film. The song was composed by Jay Ungar in 1982 and he describes it as "the song coming out of 'a sense of loss and longing' after the annual Ashokan Music & Dance Camps ended." It is the only modern piece of music heard in the film, and subsequently became the first ever single release for the Elektra Nonesuch label, which released the series' soundtrack album. It became so closely associated with the series that people frequently and erroneously believe it was a Civil War song.

Ungar, his band Fiddle Fever and pianist Jacqueline Schwab performed this song and many of the other 19th-century songs used in the film. Schwab's piano arrangements in particular have been acclaimed by many critics. Musicologist Alexander Klein wrote: "Upon watching the full documentary, one is immediately struck by the lyricism of Schwab's playing and, more importantly, her exceptional arranging skills. What had been originally rousing and at times bellicose songs such as the southern "Bonnie Blue Flag" or the northern "Battle Cry of Freedom" now suddenly sounded like heart-warming, lyrical melodies due to Schwab's interpretations. The pianist not only changed the songs' original mood but also allowed herself some harmonic liberties so as to make these century-old marching tunes into piano lamentations that contemporary audiences could fully identify with".

A major piece of vocal music in the series is a version of the old spiritual "We Are Climbing Jacob's Ladder", performed a cappella by the African-American singer, scholar and activist Bernice Johnson Reagon and several other female voices. The song appears on Reagon's album River of Life.

=== Voices ===
- Narrated by David McCullough
- Sam Waterston as Abraham Lincoln
- Julie Harris as Mary Chesnut
- Jason Robards as Ulysses S. Grant
- Morgan Freeman as Frederick Douglass and others
- Paul Roebling as Joshua Lawrence Chamberlain, Sullivan Ballou, Washington Roebling, Oliver Wendell Holmes and others
- Garrison Keillor as Walt Whitman and others
- George Black as Robert E. Lee
- Arthur Miller as William Tecumseh Sherman and others
- Christopher Murney as Elisha Hunt Rhodes
- Charley McDowell as Sam Watkins
- Horton Foote as Jefferson Davis
- George Plimpton as George Templeton Strong
- Philip Bosco as Horace Greeley
- Terry Courier as George B. McClellan
- Jody Powell as Stonewall Jackson and others
- Studs Terkel as Benjamin Butler and others
- Hoyt Axton as various
- John Hartford as various
- Colleen Dewhurst as various
- Shelby Foote as various
- Ronnie Gilbert as various
- Jeremy Irons as various
- Gene Jones as various
- Derek Jacobi as various
- Kurt Vonnegut as various
- Laurence Fishburne (credited as Larry Fishburne) as various
- Pamela Reed as various
- M. Emmet Walsh as various

=== Interviewees ===
- Ed Bearss – Military historian and author
- Barbara J. Fields – Professor of American history at Columbia University
- Shelby Foote – American writer, journalist, and Civil War historian
- Stephen Oates – Professor of history at the University of Massachusetts Amherst
- William Safire – American author, columnist, journalist, and presidential speechwriter
- James W. Symington – former Congressman
- Daisy Turner – 104-year-old daughter of a former plantation slave, oral historian
- Robert Penn Warren – American poet, novelist, and literary critic

== Episode list ==
Each episode was divided into numerous chapters or vignettes, but each generally had a primary theme or focus (i.e., a specific battle or topic). The series followed a fairly consistent chronological order of history.

No.	Title	Original release date
1	"The Cause" (1861)	September 23, 1990
All Night Forever; Are We Free?; A House Divided; The Meteor; Secessionitis; 4:30 a.m. April 12, 1861; Traitors and Patriots; Gun Men; Manassas; A Thousand Mile Front; Honorable Manhood
2	"A Very Bloody Affair" (1862)	September 24, 1990
Politics; Ironclads; Lincolnites; The Peninsula; Our Boy; Shiloh; The Arts of Death; Republics; On to Richmond
3	"Forever Free" (1862)	September 24, 1990
Stonewall; The Beast; The Seven Days; Kiss Daniel for Me; Saving the Union; Antietam; The Higher Object
4	"Simply Murder" (1863)	September 25, 1990
Northern Lights; Oh! Be Joyful; The Kingdom of Jones; Under the Shade of the Trees; A Dust-Covered Man
5	"The Universe of Battle" (1863)	September 25, 1990
Gettysburg: The First Day; Gettysburg: The Second Day; Gettysburg: The Third Day; She Ranks Me; Vicksburg; Bottom Rail on Top; The River of Death; A New Birth of Freedom
6	"Valley of the Shadow of Death" (1864)	September 26, 1990
Grant; Lee; In the Wilderness; Move By the Left Flank; Now, Fix Me; The Remedy
7	"Most Hallowed Ground" (1864)	September 26, 1990
A Warm Place in the Field; Nathan Bedford Forrest; Summer, 1864; Spies; The Crater; Headquarters U.S.A.; The Promised Land; The Age of Shoddy; Can Those Be Men?; The People's Resolution; Most Hallowed Ground
8	"War Is All Hell" (1865)	September 27, 1990
Sherman's March; The Breath of Emancipation; Died of a Theory; Washington, March 4, 1865; I Want to See Richmond; Appomattox
9	"The Better Angels of Our Nature" (1865)	September 27, 1990
Assassination; Useless, Useless; The Picklocks of Biographers; Was It Not Real?

== Reception and awards ==
The series received more than forty major film and television awards, including two Emmy Awards, two Grammy Awards, Producer of the Year Award from the Producers Guild of America, People's Choice Award, Peabody Award, duPont-Columbia Award, D.W. Griffith Award, and the US$50,000 Lincoln Prize, among dozens of others.

The series sparked a major renewal of interest in the Civil War. It was widely acclaimed for its skillful depiction and retelling of the Civil War events, and also for drawing huge numbers of viewers into a new awareness of the historical importance of the conflict. Before the series, the Civil War had receded in popular historical consciousness since its 1960s centennial. Following the series, there was a sharp upturn in popular books and other works about the Civil War.

Robert Brent Toplin in 1996 wrote Ken Burns's The Civil War: Historians Respond, which included essays from critical academic historians who felt their topics of interest were not covered in enough detail and responses from Ken Burns and others involved in the series' production.

=== Historical accuracy ===
The series has been criticized for perceived historical inaccuracies, since it focuses mostly on the battles of the Civil War to the detriment of other areas. Some also believe it provides a weak or faulty explanation of the causes of the war. While academic historians concur that the war was fought to preserve slavery, Burns presented Shelby Foote's framing of that dispute as a "failure to compromise". Though Foote was a journalist and novelist rather than a trained historian, he was given more screen time than any other commentator. The fact that Burns himself was not a historian, nor were most of his production team, has similarly led to accusations that his series did not contain a thorough enough historical overview of its subject. That most of them were also white men has also been fingered for a lack of coverage of women, blacks, or Reconstruction. The series has also been criticized for propagating the Lost Cause of the Confederacy ideology. Because Burns' documentary has been so influential, and serves as the main source of knowledge about the Civil War for many Americans, some critics fear it has perpetuated this discredited view.

=== Legacy ===
"Pillows and Blankets", the 2012 episode of the NBC sitcom Community, is a parody of the series' distinct style.

== Remastering ==
=== 12th Anniversary ===
The entire series was digitally remastered for re-release on September 17, 2002 in VHS and DVD by PBS Home Video and Warner Home Video. The DVD release included a short documentary on how a Spirit DataCine was used to transfer and remaster the film. The remastering was limited to producing an improved fullscreen standard-definition digital video of the film's interpositive negatives, for broadcast and DVD. The soundtrack was also re-mastered and remixed in 5.1 Dolby Digital AC3 surround sound.

Paul Barnes, Editor & Post-Production Supervisor, Florentine Films at that time commented:

Ken Burns and I decided to remaster The Civil War for several reasons. First of all, when we completed the film in 1989, we were operating under a very tight schedule and budget. As the main editor on the film, I always wanted to go back and improve the overall quality of the film. The other reason for remastering the film at this time is that the technology to color correct, print and transfer a film to video for broadcast has vastly improved, especially in the realm of digital computer technology... We also were able to eliminate a great deal of the dust and dirt that often get embedded into 16mm film when it is printed.

=== 25th Anniversary ===
For the 150th anniversary of the end of the war, and the 25th anniversary of the series, PBS remastered the series in high definition. This work involved creating a new 4K ultra-high-definition digital master of the film's original camera negatives and was carried out in association with the George Eastman House, where the original 16mm negatives are preserved. It aired on PBS from September 7 to 11, 2015. Blu-ray and DVD editions were released on October 13, 2015.

== Soundtrack ==
A soundtrack featuring songs from the miniseries, many of which were songs popular during the Civil War, has been released.

No.	Title	Artist(s)	Length
1.	"Drums of War"	Old Bethpage Brass Band	0:10
2.	"Oliver Wendell Holmes"	Paul Roebling	0:32
3.	"Ashokan Farewell"	Jay Ungar, Matt Glaser, Evan Stover, Russ Barenberg, Molly Mason	4:05
4.	"Battle Cry of Freedom"	Jacqueline Schwab	1:40
5.	"We Are Climbing Jacob's Ladder"	Bernice Johnson Reagon	4:27
6.	"Dixie" / "Bonnie Blue Flag"	New American Brass Band	1:57
7.	"Cheer Boys Cheer"	New American Brass Band	1:12
8.	"Angel Band"	Barenburg, Jesse Carr	1:07
9.	"Johnny Has Gone for a Soldier"	Schwab, Carr	1:44
10.	"Lorena"	Ungar, Carr	1:44
11.	"Parade"	New American Brass Band	3:30
12.	"Hail, Columbia"	New American Brass Band	2:06
13.	"Dixie" (reprise, lament)	Bobby Horton	2:06
14.	"Kingdom Coming"	Glaser, Stover, Ungar, Art Baron, Mason	1:01
15.	"Battle Hymn of the Republic"	Ungar, Schwab	1:38
16.	"All Quiet on the Potomac"	Schwab	1:12
17.	"Flag of Columbia"	Schwab	1:03
18.	"Weeping Sad and Lonely"	Glasser, Schwab, Carr	1:10
19.	"Yankee Doodle"	Old Bethpage Brass Band	0:41
20.	"Palmyra Schottische"	New American Brass Band	3:30
21.	"When Johnny Comes Marching Home"	Old Bethpage Brass Band	0:45
22.	"Shenandoah"	John Levy, John Colby	0:47
23.	"When Johnny Comes Marching Home" (reprise)	Ungar, Yonatin Malin, Schwab, Mason, Peter Amidon	1:00
24.	"Marching Through Georgia"	Ungar, Mason, Amidon	0:57
25.	"Marching Through Georgia" (reprise, lament)	Schwab	1:14
26.	"Battle Cry of Freedom" (reprise)	Schwab	2:33
27.	"Battle Hymn of the Republic" (reprise)	Abyssianian Baptist Choir	3:22
28.	"Ashokan Farewell" / "Sullivan Ballou letter"	Ungar, Roebling, David McCullough	3:34

== See also ==
- List of films and television shows about the American Civil War
- The War, World War II documentary miniseries by Ken Burns
- The Vietnam War, Vietnam War documentary series by Ken Burns
- Still image film
- Lost Cause of the Confederacy
