= Evolver =

Evolver may refer to:

== Music ==
- Evolver (311 album), a 2003 album
- Evolver (The Choirboys album), a 2004 album
- Evolver (Godhead album), a 2003 album
- Evolver (The Grid album), a 1994 album
- Evolver (John Legend album), a 2008 album by R&B/soul singer John Legend
- Evolver (The Mammals album), a 2002 album

== Other uses ==
- Evolver (software), a genetic algorithm optimization solver program
- Evolver (film), a 1995 horror/science fiction B-movie
- Evolver (synthesizer), an analog-digital hybrid synthesizer designed by Dave Smith
- Evolver: 62, a stage show and documentary by Mark Lewisohn
