= Sometymes Why =

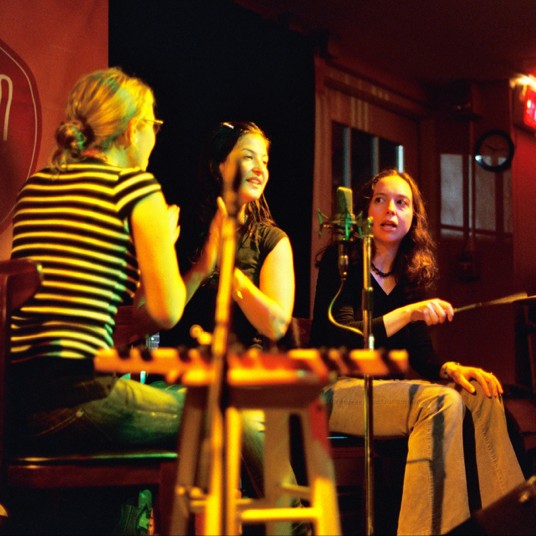

Background information
- Origin: United States
- Genres: Americana, Folk Noir
- Years active: 2005–Present
- Label: Signature Sounds
- Members: Kristin Andreassen, Aoife O'Donovan, Ruth Ungar
- Website: sometymeswhy.com

Sometymes Why is an American Folk Noir group, formed in 2005 by Kristin Andreassen, Aoife O'Donovan, and Ruth Ungar. Its members all live in New York City, though the band tours frequently at festivals such as Bonnaroo. The band has released two records. Their last CD, Your Heart is a Glorious Machine, was released in 2009 on Signature Sounds. Allmusic called their sound a "heady blend of Americana, old-timey/alternative country and alternative folk."

== History ==
=== 2005: Founding and debut ===
Contemporary/neo-traditional folk noir trio Sometymes Why was formed in 2005 by O’Donovan, Kristin Andreassen and Ruth Ungar. They came together from other bands, including Uncle Earl the Jolly Bankers (Andreassen), Crooked Still, the Wild Band of Snee, the Wayfaring Strangers (O’Donovan), The Mammals and Jay Ungar & Molly Mason’s Family Band (Merenda). Sometymes Why released their debut CD in 2005 titled Sometimes Why. Allmusic called their sound a "heady blend of Americana, old-timey/alternative country and alternative folk."

=== 2009: Your Heart is a Glorious Machine ===
Your Heart Is a Glorious Machine is a very earthy, organic-sounding album - organic when it comes to production...organic when it comes to the often clever lyrics, organic when it comes to the sheer rootsiness of it all...Sometymes Why incorporate everything from bluegrass to jazz to rural blues...

— Alex Henderson of Allmusic (Mar 2009)

Sometymes Why's last CD, Your Heart is a Glorious Machine, was released in March 2009 on Signature Sounds and was produced by José Ayerve. Allmusic gave Your Heart Is a Glorious Machine 3.5/5 stars and a positive review, praising the diverse combinations of genres. Wrote No Depression about the release, the songwriting was "whimsical and honest," while their musicianship was of the "highest quality. Their voices, separately and together, are extraordinary, and lovely." Among various gigs in support of the album, Sometymes Why opened two tours for the Brooklyn progressive bluegrass group Punch Brothers.

=== 2010-14: Recent projects ===
Since touring in support of their sophomore album in 2009, the members have pursued their individual solo careers while also periodically touring as Sometymes Why. Since moving to New York in 2009 Andreassen continues to be active with both Uncle Earl and Sometymes Why, as well as with other local groups as a guest artist. As of June 2014 Andreassen was touring with O'Donovan, with both singers performing material from their respective solo albums.

== Members ==
Current as of 2014

- Kristin Andreassen (2005-2014) - vocals, guitar, harmonica, glockenspiel, tambourine
- Aoife O'Donovan (2005-2014) - vocals, guitar, piano, baritone ukulele, Wurlitzer, soprano ukulele, glockenspiel
- Ruth Ungar (2005-2014) - vocals, fiddle, soprano ukulele, guitar, baritone ukulele, glockenspiel

Producers

- José Ayerve

== Discography ==
Albums by Sometymes Why
Year	Album title	Release details
2005	Sometimes Why	Released: Aug 12, 2005; Label: Self-released
2007	Sometimes Why Silver Edition	Released: 2007; Label: Self-released
2008	Your Heart is a Glorious Machine	Released: Jun 3, 2008; Label: Signature Sounds

== See also ==
- Neo-folk
