= Juliet =

Character in Shakespeare's Romeo and Juliet

Juliet Capulet
- Romeo and Juliet character
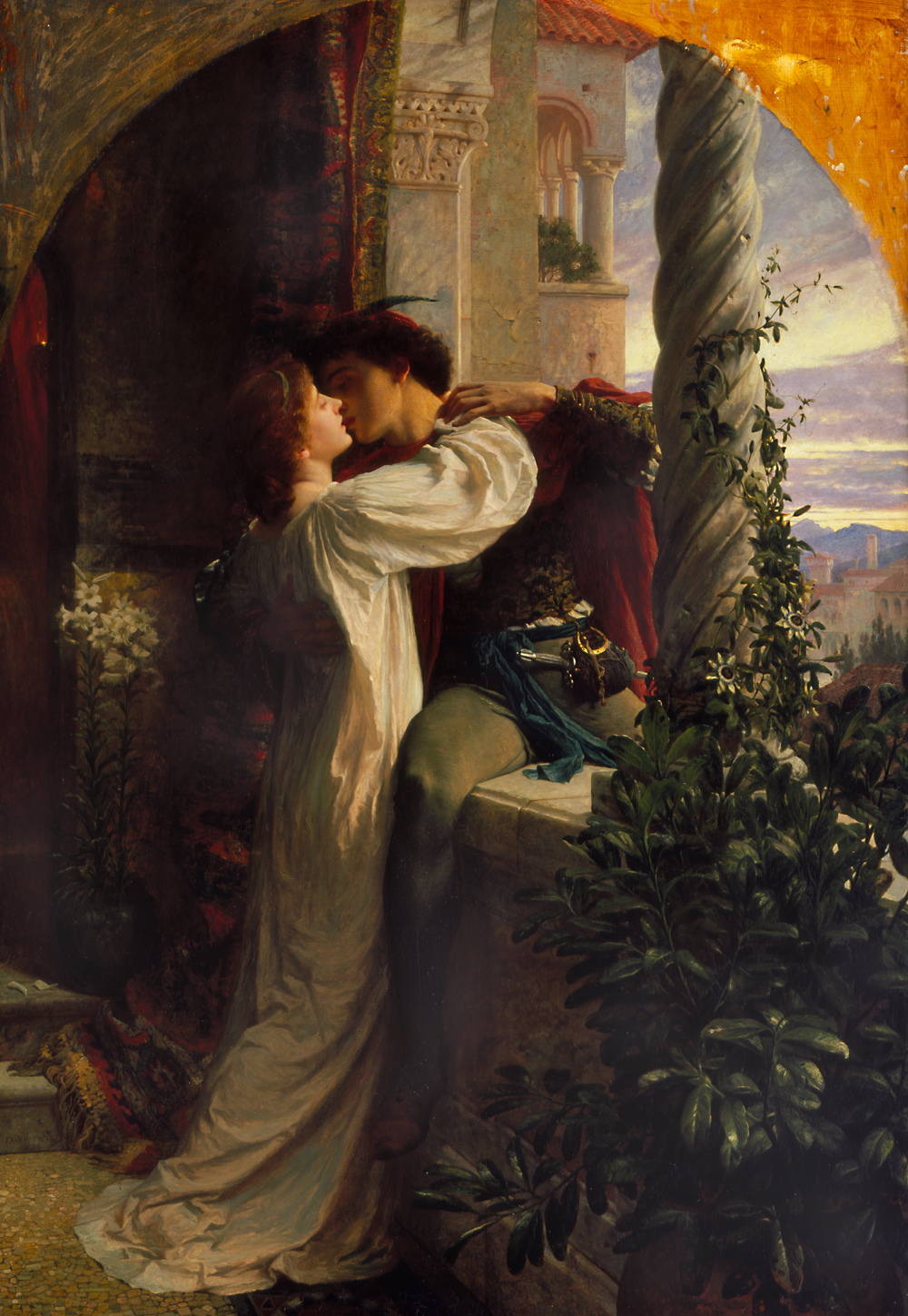
- The balcony scene in Romeo and Juliet as depicted by Frank Dicksee (1884)
- First appearance: Romeo and Juliet; c. 1591–95
- Created by: William Shakespeare
- Based on: Juliet from The Tragical History of Romeus and Juliet (1561)

In-universe information
- Family: Lord Capulet (father); Lady Capulet (mother); Lord Montague (father-in-law); Lady Montague (mother-in-law); Tybalt Capulet (cousin); Rosaline Capulet (cousin); Benvolio Montague (cousin by marriage)
- Spouse: Romeo Montague
- Nationality: Italian

Juliet Capulet (Italian: Giulietta Capuleti [dʒuˈljetta kapuˈleːti]) is the female protagonist in William Shakespeare's romantic tragedy Romeo and Juliet. A 13-year-old girl, Juliet is the only daughter of the patriarch of the House of Capulet. She falls in love with the male protagonist Romeo, a member of the House of Montague, with which the Capulets have a blood feud. The story has a long history that precedes Shakespeare himself.

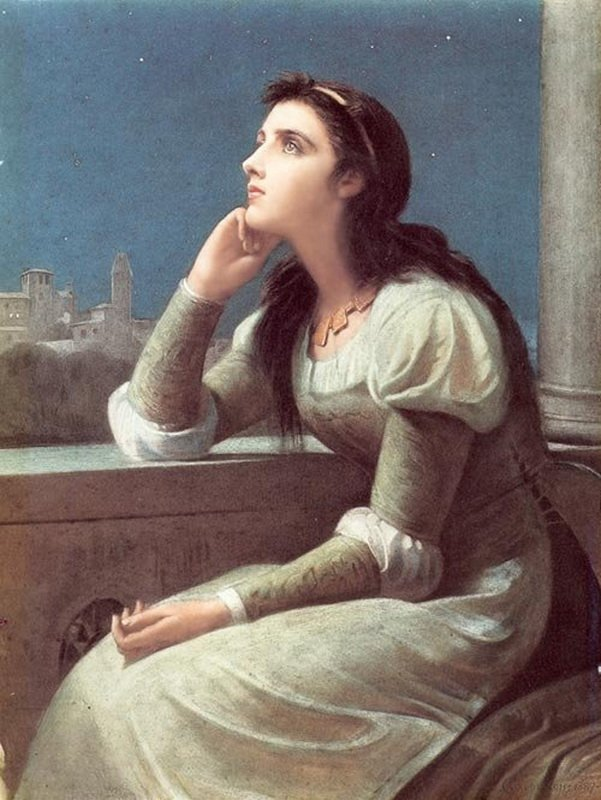
Juliet by Philip H. Calderon (1888)

== Juliet's age ==
As the story occurs, Juliet is approaching her fourteenth birthday. She was born on "Lammas Eve at night" (1 August), so Juliet's birthday is 31 July (1.3.19). Her birthday is "a fortnight hence", putting the action of the play in mid-July (1.3.17). Her father states that she "hath not seen the change of fourteen years" (1.2.9). In many cultures and time periods, women married and had children at a young age. Lady Capulet had given birth to her first child by the time she had reached Juliet's age: "By my count, I was your mother much upon these years that you are now a maid." (1.3.74–75).

Even Capulet tries to encourage Count Paris, a wealthy suitor, to wait a little longer before even thinking of marrying his daughter, feeling that she is still too young; "She hath not seen the change of fourteen years, Let two more summers wither in their pride, Ere we may think her ripe to be a bride". However, in the English poem the story is based on (Romeus and Juliet by Arthur Brooke) Juliet is approaching her sixteenth birthday and Romeo is the same age whereas in the Bandello novella she is nearly eighteen with Romeo about twenty. The common English people of that age were very rarely in their teens when they married and even among the nobility and gentry of the age, brides 13 years of age were rare, at about one in 1,000 brides; in that era, the vast majority of English brides were at least 19 years of age when they first married, most commonly at about 23 years, and most English noblewomen were at least 16 when they married. That the parts of young women were played by pre-adolescent boys in Shakespeare's day also cannot be overlooked; it is possible that Shakespeare had the physique of a young boy in mind during composition, in addition to the fact that Romeo and Juliet are of wealthy families and would be more likely to marry earlier than commoners. At the time, English noblewomen married on average at 19–21 years (compared to 24–26 years for English noblemen) while the average marriage age in England was 25–26 years for women and 27–28 for men.

The common belief in Elizabethan England was that motherhood before 16 was dangerous; popular manuals of health, as well as observations of married life, led Elizabethans to believe that early marriage and its consummation permanently damaged a young woman's health, impaired a young man's physical and mental development, and produced sickly or stunted children. Therefore, 18 came to be considered the earliest reasonable age for motherhood and 20 and 30 the ideal ages for women and men, respectively, to marry. Shakespeare might also have reduced Juliet's age from 16 to 13 to demonstrate the dangers of marriage at too young an age; that Shakespeare himself married Anne Hathaway when he was 18 might hold some significance.

== In modern-day Verona ==
=== Casa di Giulietta ===
Bronze statue of Juliet in Verona

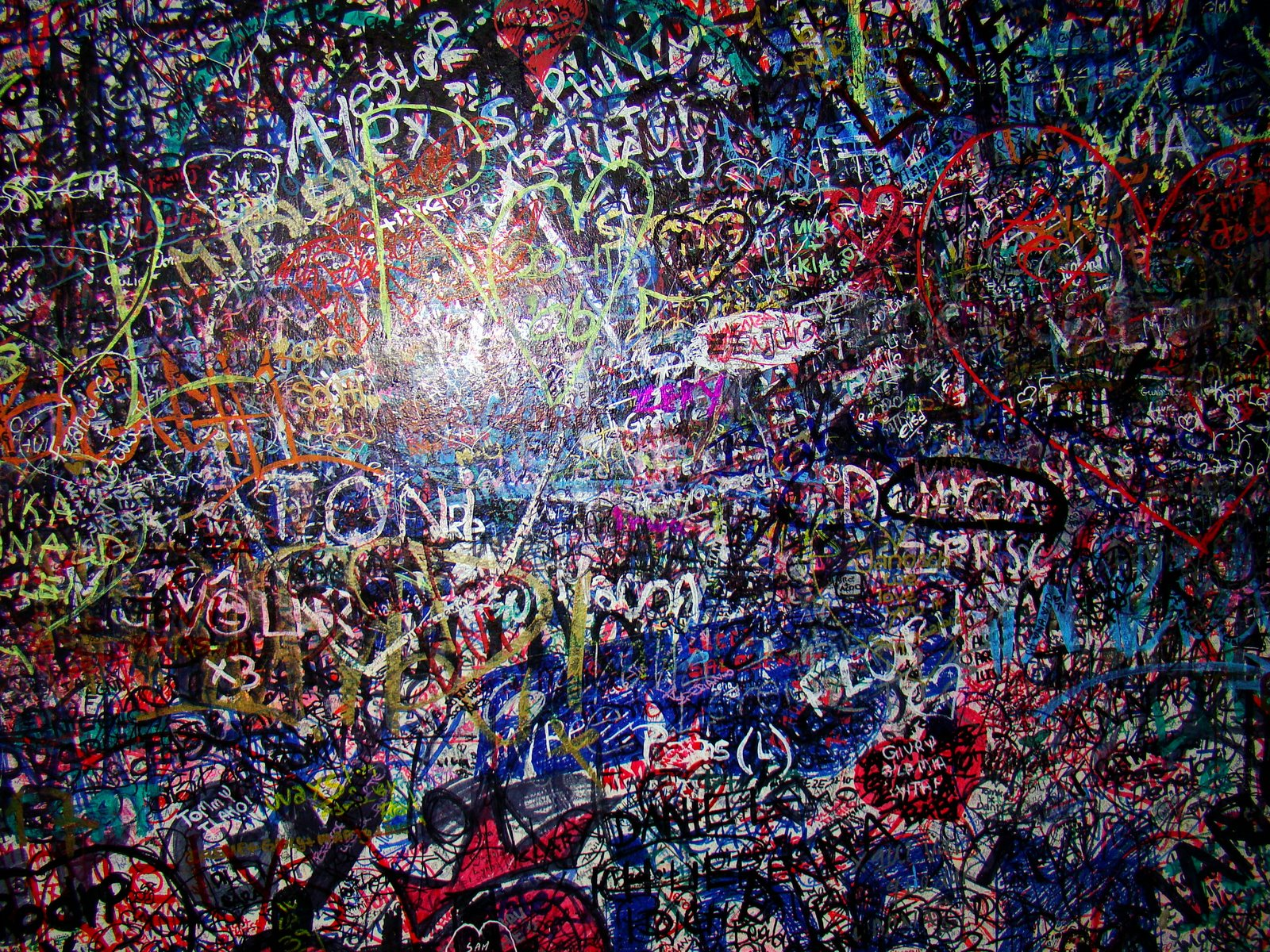
The entrance wall known as Juliet's wall

In Verona, an early 14th-century house at Via Cappello no. 23, claiming to be the Capulets' has been turned into a tourist attraction. It is, however, mostly empty. The actual family name in Italian was Cappelletti, a noble family, and not Capuleti. Cappelletti had in the past been members of the light cavalry of the Republic of Venice and had fought for it since the 13th century. They were originally from Dalmatia and Albania. The house, with its distinctive balcony, is one of the most visited sites in Verona. In its small courtyard is a bronze statue of Juliet. The metal surface across its chest is polished from constant handling, due to a legend stating that if a person strokes the right breast of the statue, they will have good fortune and luck in love.

Many people write their names and the names of loved ones on the walls of the entrance, known as Juliet's wall. In 2019, after a restoration and cleaning of the building, it was intended that further writing should be on replaceable panels or white sheets placed outside the wall.

It is also a tradition to put small love letters on the walls (which is done by the thousands each year), which are regularly taken down by employees to keep the courtyard clean.

Another tradition that occurs in Juliet's courtyard is writing one's name and that of a loved one on a lock and attaching it to a large ornamental gate in the back left.

=== Club di Giulietta ===
Since the 1930s, letters addressed to Juliet have arrived in Verona. As of 2010, more than 5,000 letters were received annually, three-quarters of which were from women. The largest single group of senders was American teenagers. The letters are read and replied to by local volunteers, organised since the 1980s in the Club di Giulietta (Juliet Club), which is financed by the City of Verona. The club has been the subject of a book by Lise and Ceil Friedman and is the setting for a 2010 American film, Letters to Juliet.

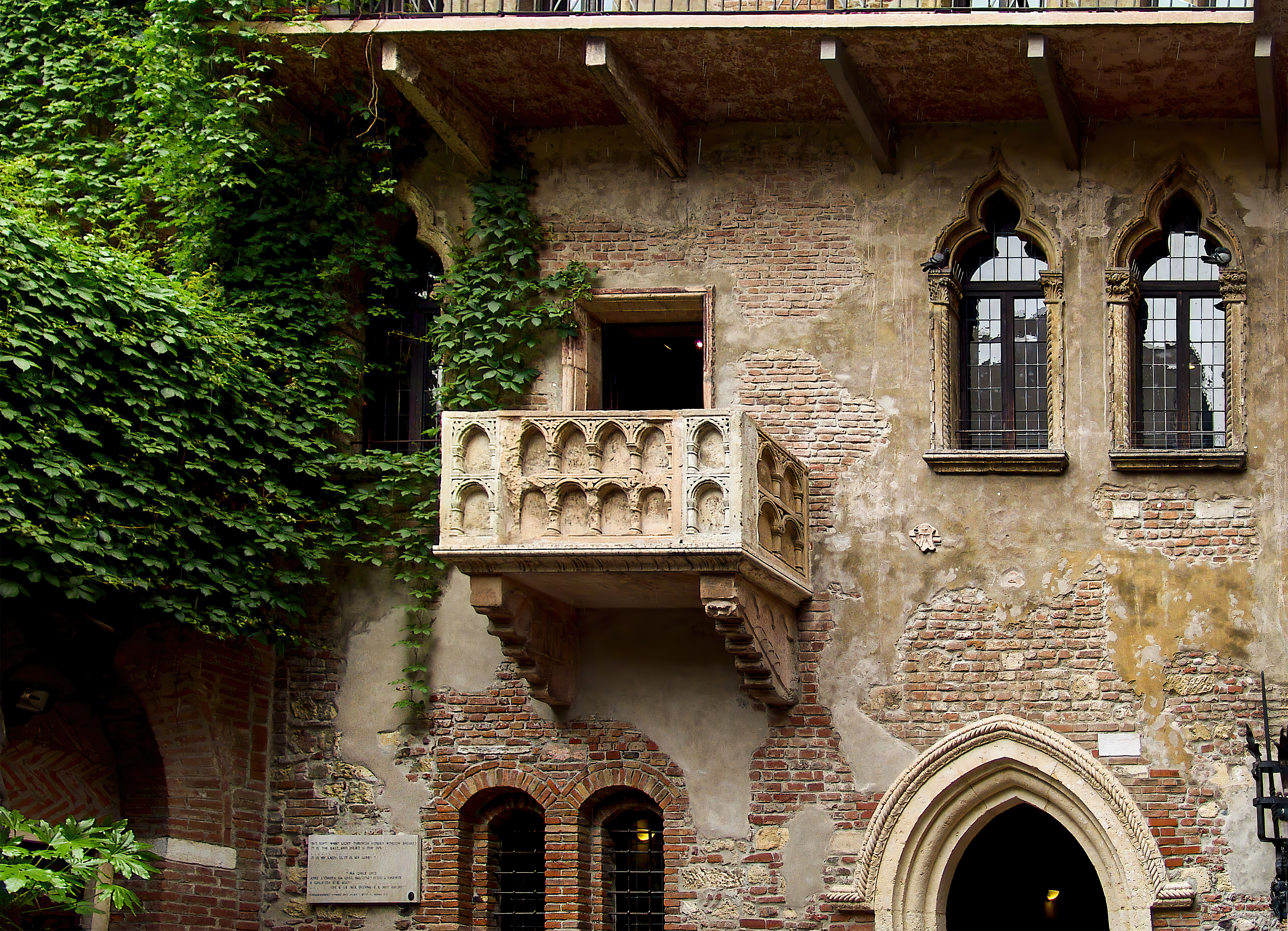
Juliet's purported balcony, in Verona. Beneath it, on the walls, there are love letters.

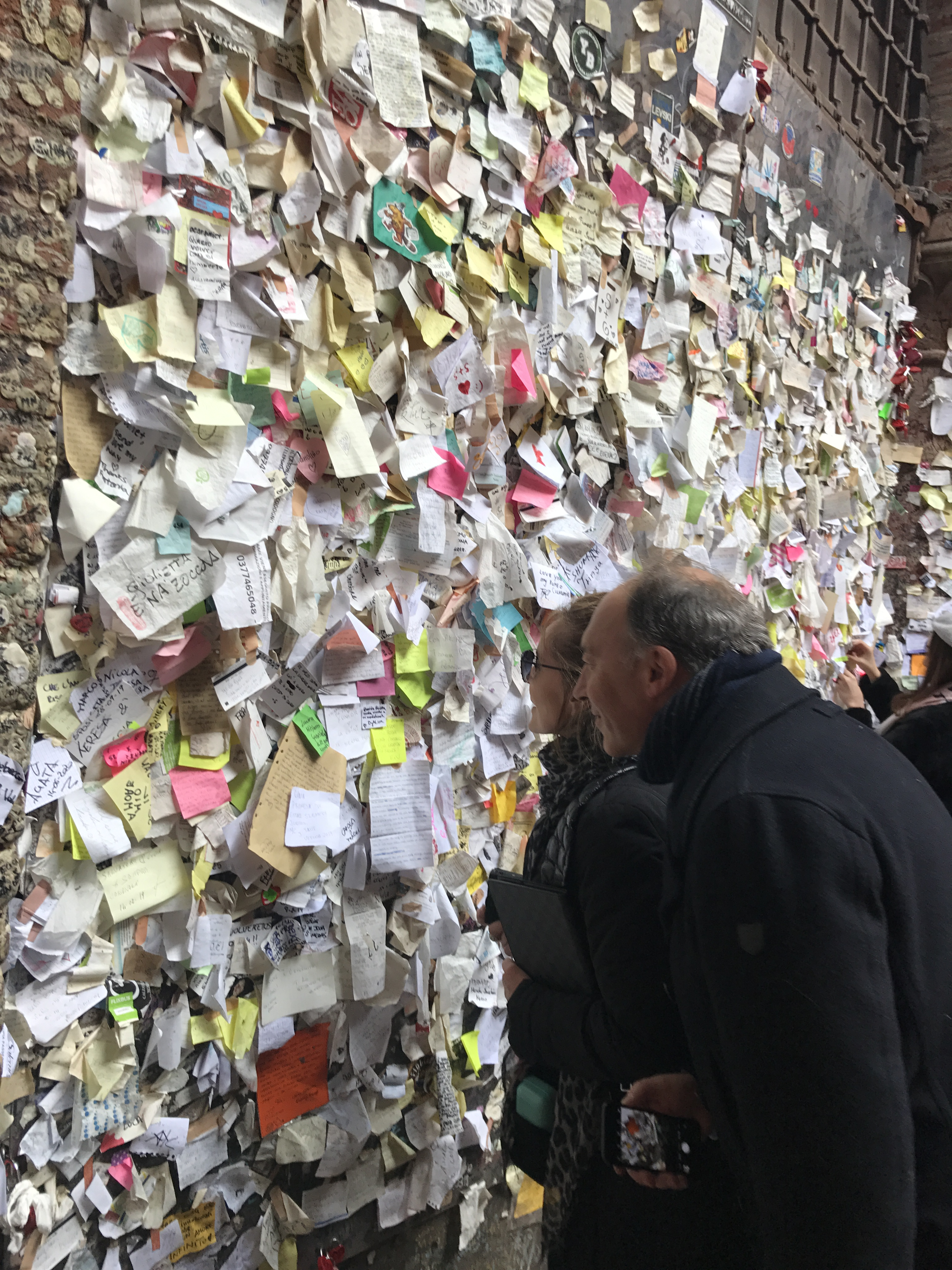
Love letter wall, Verona

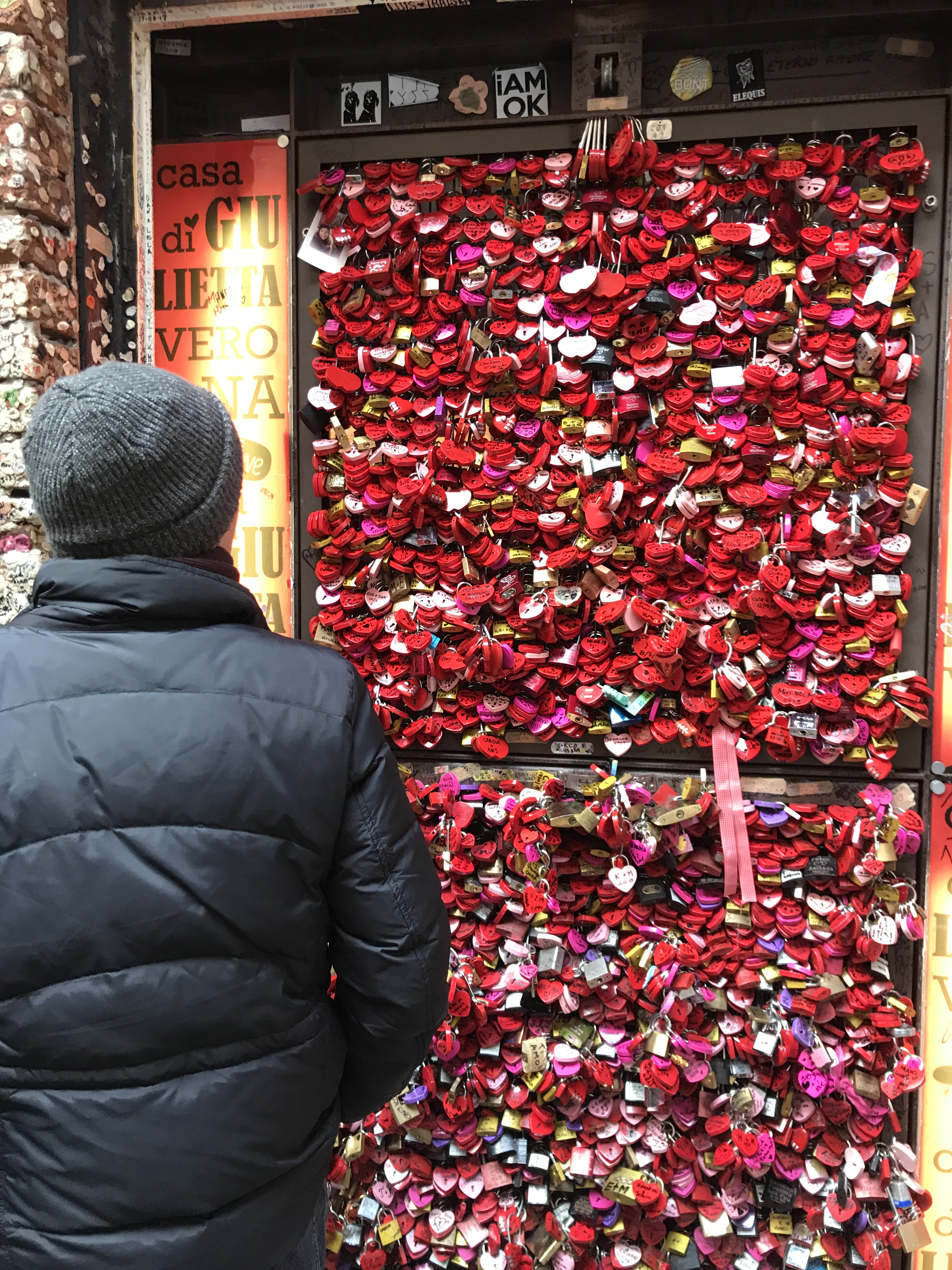
Love locket wall beneath the balcony, Verona

== Performers ==
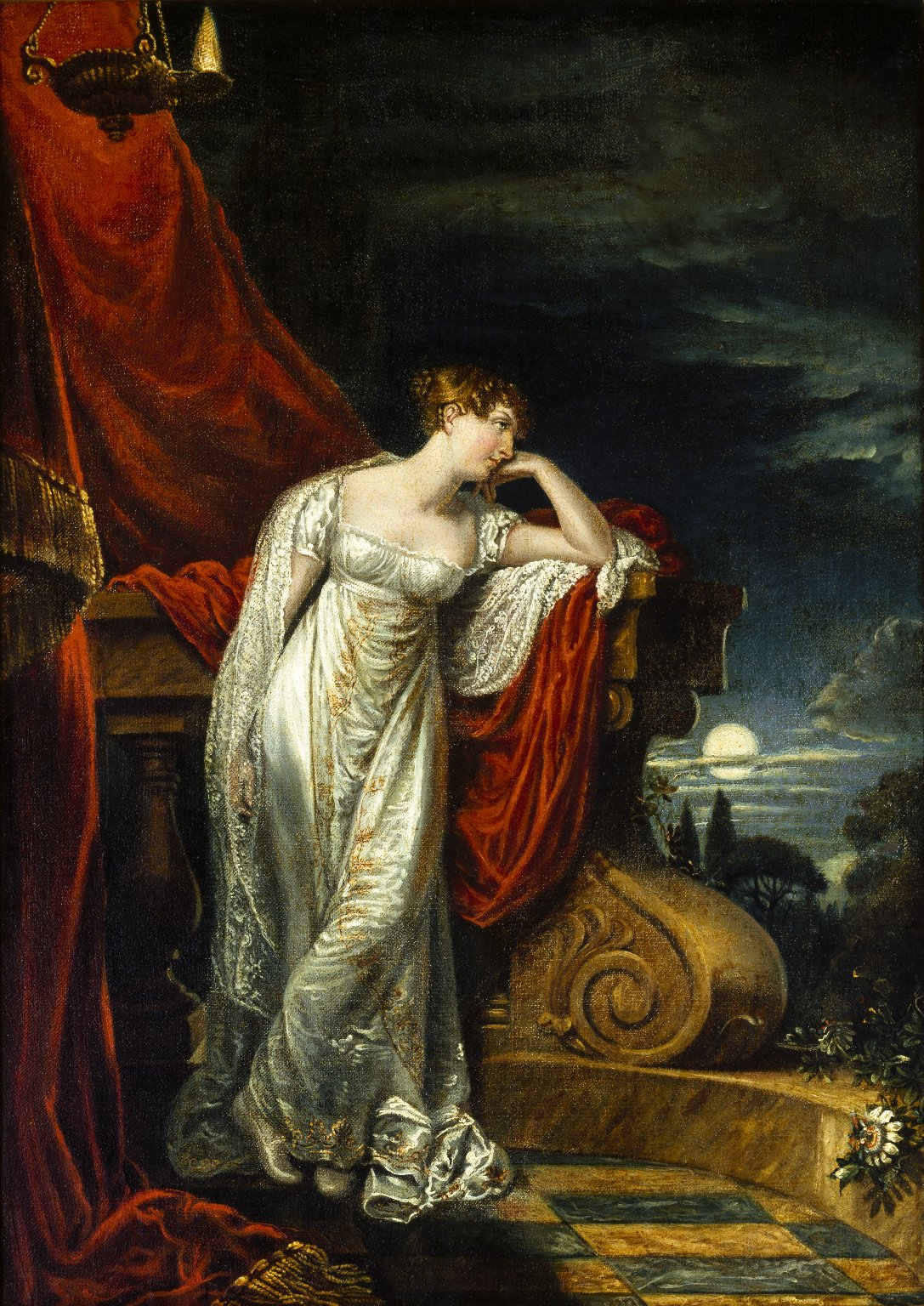
George Dawe's 1816's Study for Miss O'Neill as Juliet

A number of famous actresses and some actors have portrayed the role of Juliet:

- Mary Saunderson was the first woman to play Juliet professionally. Previous actors had all been males.
- Eliza O'Neill played Juliet at Covent Garden in 1814.
- Katharine Cornell had a notable Broadway success as Juliet opposite Basil Rathbone as Romeo in 1934, and revived the production with Maurice Evans as Romeo and Ralph Richardson as Mercutio the following year.
- Peggy Ashcroft was one of the most well-known Juliets in history, most famously in the 1935 London production directed by John Gielgud, in which Gielgud and Laurence Olivier alternated the roles of Romeo and Mercutio.
- Norma Shearer in George Cukor's Romeo and Juliet (1936). Leslie Howard was her Romeo.
- Adriana Caselotti as Juliet in the Tin Man's song in Victor Fleming's The Wizard of Oz (1939).
- Judi Dench portrayed Juliet in Franco Zeffirelli's 1960 London production at the Old Vic theatre.
- Olga Bellin and her husband Paul Roebling performed the balcony scene, as the first segment in the 4-part Group W-produced special Romeos and Juliets – A Theme With Variations, which debuted in the fall of 1963 and was rebroadcast numerous times over the next eight months as part of 1964's Shakespeare Quadricentennial
- Olivia Hussey portrayed Juliet in Zeffirelli's 1968 film, Romeo and Juliet, opposite Leonard Whiting as Romeo.
- Niamh Cusack portrayed Juliet in 1986 with The Royal Shakespeare Company. Sean Bean was her Romeo.
- Kirsten Bloom Allen portrayed Juliet in 1993 and 2000, the latter with the Sacramento Ballet.
- Claire Danes was Juliet in Baz Luhrmann's modernized 1996 version, Romeo + Juliet, alongside Leonardo DiCaprio as Romeo.
- Cécilia Cara originated the role of Juliet in the French musical Roméo et Juliette in 2001.
- Gugu Mbatha-Raw portrayed Juliet at the Royal Exchange Theatre's 2005 production.
- James Patrick Davis portrayed Juliet in an all-male 2008 production with Shakespeare Theatre Company, opposite actor Finn Wittrock as Romeo.
- Ellie Kendrick portrayed Juliet in Dominic Dromgoole’s 2010 production, filmed at Shakespeare's Globe.
- Hailee Steinfeld portrayed Juliet in Carlo Carlei's film adaptation, opposite Douglas Booth as Romeo.
- Deepika Padukone portrayed Juliet in Sanjay Leela Bhansali's 2013 Hindi adaptation of Romeo and Juliet, Goliyon Ki Raasleela Ram-Leela (translated as "A Play of Bullets: Ram-Leela"), opposite Ranveer Singh as Romeo.
- Teresa Palmer portrayed Julie Grigio, Juliet's analogue in the 2013 zombie movie adaptation Warm Bodies, opposite Nicholas Hoult as R, the film's zombified Romeo analogue
- Lily James starred as Juliet in a 2016 West End production of Romeo and Juliet.
- In the 2019 West End musical & Juliet, Juliet is played by actress Miriam-Teak Lee.
- Lorna Courtney portrayed Juliet in the 2022 Broadway version of "& Juliet".
- Francesca Amewudah-Rivers, born to a Ghanaian father and Nigerian mother, was cast to portray Juliet in a 2024 West End production, alongside Tom Holland as Romeo.
- Rachel Zegler, was cast to portray Juliet in a 2024 Broadway production, alongside Kit Connor as Romeo.
- Clara Rugaard as Juliet in the 2017 television series Still Star-Crossed and the 2025 musical film Juliet & Romeo.

=== Animation ===
- In Romeo & Juliet: Sealed with a Kiss, Juliet is portrayed as a white seal and is voiced by Patricia Trippett, while her brother Daniel was the voice of the brown seal Romeo.
- Fumie Mizusawa voices Juliet in the heroic fantasy adaptation Romeo x Juliet by the Japanese animation studio GONZO, with Takahiro Mizushima voicing Romeo; Brina Palencia and Chris Burnett portrayed the characters in the English-language dub.
- Kristin Fairlie voices Juliet in the children's TV series Peg + Cat.
- In Gnomeo & Juliet, Juliet is a Lawn gnome voiced by Emily Blunt. She reprises the role for the film's sequel Sherlock Gnomes.
- The Sea Prince and the Fire Child is a loosely-based Japanese animation film adaptation, with Mami Koyama voicing Malta the Fire Child and Tōru Furuya as Sirius the Sea Prince; Tony Oliver and an uncredited voice actress portrayed the characters in the English adaptation.

=== Fictional performers ===
- The Academy Award-winning film Shakespeare in Love depicts history's first Juliet as being illegally played by a noblewoman named Viola de Lesseps (Gwyneth Paltrow), who is romantically involved with William Shakespeare (Joseph Fiennes).
- In her music video Love Story, American singer-songwriter Taylor Swift played the part of Juliet. The plot was transformed to a happy ending, instead of tragic.
- In the credits of Toy Story 3, one of the Squeeze Toy Aliens/LGMs play the role of Juliet while wearing a dress, a wig and a princess hat.
- In the climax of "Casting Call" from The Mysteries of Alfred Hedgehog, after Camille Wallaby solves the episode's mystery with help from fellow protagonists Alfred and Milo, she is chosen to portray Juliet in a production of the play.
- In The Sims 2, Juliet reappears as Juliette Capp.
- In the episode "Chem Gems" from Danger Rangers, during the song called "Don't Touch That", the pink cat Kitty portrays Juliet.
- In the sitcom Wizards of Waverly Place, actress Bridgit Mendler portrays Juliet (as a vampire) and the Romeo of the show was Justin Russo, portrayed by actor David Henrie. In this episode, their families' feud is a result of rival submarine sandwich shops).
- The internet franchise Epic Rap Battles of History features Grace Helbig as Juliet, alongside Nice Peter as Romeo rapping against a fictionalized depiction of Bonnie and Clyde.
- Isabela Merced plays the character in Rosaline (2022).

== See also ==
- & Juliet, 2019 musical
