= Ken Maiuri =

- Born: Kenneth Maiuri; 1971 (age 54–55); Springfield, Massachusetts
- Genres: Rock, new wave
- Occupations: Musician, composer, writer
- Instruments: Keyboards, guitar, drums, vocals
- Years active: 1989–present

Kenneth Maiuri (born 1971) is an American multi-instrumentalist and composer based in Florence, Massachusetts. Since early 2016, he has been the keyboardist for The B-52's. He has played in numerous other bands, such as Pedro the Lion and The Mammals. He has been part of the live band for performances of "Picture-Stories" created by Ben Katchor and Mark Mulcahy, including The Slug Bearers of Kayrol Island, or, The Friends of Dr. Rushower; A Checkroom Romance; and Up from the Stacks. Maiuri co-composed the music to Jason Mazzotta's 2015 short film The Century of Love, Part I. In 2023, he backed up Eggstone’s Per Sunding for his first-ever US tour. He has appeared on Jimmy Kimmel Live! (with The B-52's), The Tonight Show with Jay Leno and The Ellen DeGeneres Show (as a member of the Young@Heart Chorus band), Fresh Air (with Mark Mulcahy), and Mountain Stage (with Mark Mulcahy and The Mammals).

== Career ==
- MediaDarlings (1989–1994) (guitar/vocals, with Cullen Faugno on bass/vocals)
- Sourpuss (1994–1995) (guitar, with Alyssa Marchese on bass, Brian Marchese on drums and Todd McMurray on vocals)
- Ribboncandy (1996–present) (guitar/vocals, with Joel Boultinghouse from Tizzy on bass and Rich Germain from Stringbean on drums)
- Encyclopedia Brown (drums)
- King Radio (keyboards)
- Mission Orange (keyboards)
- Michael Merenda Jr. & The Voltage Box (drums, glockenspiel, backing vocals)
- Dew Claw (guitar)
- The New Harmful (guitar)
- The Greenbergs (bass)
- TW Walsh (drums, guitar, bass)
- New Radiant Storm King (bass, guitar, keyboards)
- The Aloha Steamtrain (keyboards)
- The Tealights (bass)
- The National Convention (keyboards)
- The Maggies (guitar, keyboards)
- The Mammals (2002-late 2003: bass, guitar, drums, keyboards)
- School for the Dead (2001–2014) (keyboards)
- The Soft Drugs (bass)
- Pedro the Lion (2004 – 2005: bass, backing vocals)
- The Fawns (keyboards)
- Young@Heart Chorus (bass, accordion, piano)
- Marykate O'Neil (keyboards, backing vocals)
- Mark Mulcahy (keyboards, drums, guitar, bass)
- Gentle Hen (2014 – present: keyboards, guitar)
- The B-52's (2016 – present: keyboards, guitar)

Ken Maiuri wrote the weekly music column "Clubland" for the Daily Hampshire Gazette from April 1995 to February 2020.

He hosts the long-running radio programs "Wiggly World" (a freeform mix, Monday nights 8 – 11 p.m. ET) and the "Saturday Jazz Show" (Saturdays 11 a.m. – 2 p.m. ET) online, on the Mixlr broadcast platform.

== Discography ==
=== 1994 ===
- Sourpuss – Rocket Day (7-inch EP)

=== 1996 ===
- Ribboncandy - Dynamic Ribbon Device (cassette EP)

=== 1998 ===
- Ribboncandy - Girlfriend Is Mad (cassette EP)
- King Radio – Mr. K is Dead, Go Home (Tar Hut)
- The Maggies – Homesick (ChickenMan Records)

=== 1999 ===
- Chappaquiddick Skyline – S/T (Sub Pop)

=== 2000 ===
- Joe Pernice – Big Tobacco (Glitterhouse)
- Spouse – Nozomi (Pigeon/Wormco)
- Pernice Brothers – E.P. (Ashmont Records)

=== 2001 ===
- Michael J. Merenda Jr. – Trapped In the Valley (Humble Abode)
- The Maggies – Robot Stories (Garageband Records)
- TW Walsh – Blue Laws (Truckstop)
- The Maggies – Breakfast at Brelreck’s (ChickenMan Records)
- Hit the Hay Vol. 5 (Sound Asleep Records)

=== 2002 ===
- King Radio – The Mission Orange EP (Not Lame)
- The Mammals – Evolver (Humble Abode)
- New Radiant Storm King – Winter's Kill (Rainbow Quartz)
- The Aloha Steamtrain – The Aloha Steamtrain (Rub Wrongways)

=== 2003 ===
- Pierce Woodward – Leave No Millionaire Behind
- The Pelicans – London Crawling (Rub Wrongways)
- School for the Dead – The Chain CD (Rub Wrongways)
- Sitting Next To Brian – A Cartoon, A Joke (Rub Wrongways)
- The New Harmful – Hum In My Home (Youth Electronix)

=== 2004 ===
- King Radio – Are You the Sick Passenger? (Spirithouse)
- Pedro the Lion – Tour EP (Self-released)
- Miranda Brown – Baystate (Pigeon)
- School for the Dead – The New You (Rub Wrongways)
- The Mammals – Rock That Babe (Signature Sounds)
- Spouse – Are You Gonna Kiss Or Wave Goodbye? (Pigeon)
- The Q People: A Tribute To NRBQ (Spirithouse)
- Michael J Merenda Jr – Election Day
- At This Stage: 30 Years At The Wheatland Music Festival

=== 2005 ===
- Mark Mulcahy – In Pursuit of Your Happiness (Mezzotint)
- Pierce Woodward – Blow Them Away
- Mark Mulcahy – Franks and a Flag (Mezzotint)
- Mark Mulcahy – Love’s the Only Thing That Shuts Me Up EP (Mezzotint)
- Headphones – Headphones (Suicide Squeeze)

=== 2006 ===
- The Soft Drugs – In Moderation EP
- The Mammals - Departure (Signature Sounds)
- The Ray Mason Band – Don't Mess With Our Routine (Hi-N-Dry)
- The Fawns – A Nice Place To Be (Rub Wrongways)
- Michael J Merenda Jr. – Quiver (Humble Abode)
- A Case for Case (A Tribute to the Songs of Peter Case) (Hungry for Music)

=== 2007 ===
- Spouse – Relocation Tactics (Pigeon)

=== 2008 ===
- Marykate O'Neil – mkULTRA EP (2008)
- The National Convention – The Many Moods of The National Convention (Sweatervest)
- Mike + Ruthy – The Honeymoon Agenda (Humble Abode)
- School for the Dead – A Telephone Built for Two (Rub Wrongways)
- Sitting Next To Brian – Polite (Rub Wrongways)
- José Ayerve – Nuclear Waste Management Club (Pigeon Records)
- Young@Heart Chorus – Mostly Live (Rhino 2CD Version) (Rhino Records)
- Katie Sawicki – Time Spent Lost
- The Amity Front - Border Towns (self-released)

=== 2009 ===
- The National Convention – The Sexy Sound of The National Convention (Sweatervest)
- Marykate O'Neil – Underground (Circle C)
- Ciao My Shining Star – The Songs of Mark Mulcahy (Shout! Factory)

=== 2010 ===
- Spouse – Confidence (Nine Mile Records)
- Mike + Ruthy – Million To One (Humble Abode)
- Chris Pureka – How I Learned To See In the Dark (Sad Rabbit Music)
- Mark Mulcahy – Low Birthweight Child (7-inch single, Tongue Master Records)
- TW Walsh – Badge (single)
- Senator and the New Republic – Senator and the New Republic
- Thane Songs (Rub Wrongways)

=== 2011 ===
- Dennis Crommett – In the Buffalo Surround (Signature Sounds/Soft Alarm)
- Sarah Lee Guthrie & Johnny Irion – Bright Examples (Ninth Street Opus)
- Henning Ohlenbusch – Coming Home Alone On Christmas Eve (single) (Rub Wrongways)
- Doctor Mirabilis – A Matter of Mind (Laredo Records)

=== 2012 ===
- Young@Heart Chorus – Now
- Friends: A Tribute of the Songs of Lesa Bezo (Rub Wrongways)

=== 2013 ===
- Mark Mulcahy - Dear Mark J. Mulcahy, I Love You (Mezzotint)
- Scud Mountain Boys – Do You Love the Sun (Ashmont)
- Heather Maloney – Heather Maloney (Signature Sounds)
- TW Walsh – The Soft Drugs (Tower of Song)
- Spouse – There Goes the Road (live 2003 – 2010)

=== 2014 ===
- J Mascis - Tied to a Star (Sub Pop)
- AG Berg – Alive (single)
- Mystics Anonymous – Dreaming For Hours (Centerlight)
- Sitting Next To Brian – The Cobbler (Rub Wrongways)

=== 2015 ===
- Adam Dunetz – The Backup Plan
- Jason Bourgeois – Jason Jr. (Rub Wrongways)

=== 2016 ===
- The Fawns – Goodnight, Spacegirl (Rub Wrongways)
- If It Feels Good, Do It: A Sloan Tribute (Futureman Records)
- Gentle Hen – The Bells On the Boats On the Bay (Rub Wrongways)
- Mystics Anonymous – She Wanted the Future EP (Centerlight Records)
- The Aloha Steamtrain – Golden Hits (Rub Wrongways)

=== 2017 ===
- Mark Mulcahy – The Possum In the Driveway (Mezzotint)
- Gentle Hen – Sneaking Up On the Moon (Rub Wrongways)

=== 2018 ===
- The Mammals – Sunshiner (Humble Abode)
- J Mascis – Elastic Days (Sub Pop)
- Gentle Hen – Be Nice To Everyone (Rub Wrongways)

=== 2019 ===
- Mark Mulcahy – The Gus (Mezzotint)
- K & A Surplus – C’mon C’mon
- J Mascis – Don’t Do Me Like That (single) (Sub Pop)
- Brandi Ediss – This Christmas Day (single)
- Hit the Hay Vol. 11 (Sound Asleep Records)
- Mark Mulcahy – Taking Baby Steps (single) (Formosa Punk Records)

=== 2020 ===
- The Mammals – Nonet (Humble Abode)
- Brandi Ediss – Bees and Bees and Bees (Futureman Records)
- The Fawns – TLA EP (Rub Wrongways)
- Jason Bourgeois – Let Me Into Your Life (single) (Rub Wrongways)
- Gentle Hen – Turn It Down (single) (Rub Wrongways)
- Beige – Medium Length Ostrich Ride
- Miranda Brown – Sweet Love (single)
- Garden of Earthly Delights – An XTC Celebration (Futureman Records)
- Young@Heart Chorus – Miss You

=== 2021 ===
- Spouse – Emergency! (Pigeon Records)
- Havin’ a Good Time: A Tribute To Lord Russ (Rub Wrongways)
- Jake Manzi – Whatever My Heart Allows
- Mystics Anonymous – Soft Shoulder (single)
- Spouse – The Weather Nut Theme (single)

=== 2022 ===
- Singing Next to Brian: A Tribute to Brian Marchese (Rub Wrongways)
- Spouse – Love Won’t Always Love You Back (single)
- Ribboncandy – Clearinghouse Sweepstakes

=== 2023 ===
- Ken Maiuri – Four Color Press
- Sourpuss – Mob Again Together: Sourpuss 1994–1995
- Ken Maiuri – The Pop-Up Book EP
- Ray Mason – Is There Wiggle Room? (Captivating Music)
- Jeremy Dubs and Ken Maiuri - You And Me (Sing the Songs of the World) (single) (self-released)
- Spouse - You Are No Clone (Pigeon Records)
- Kate Pierson - Every Day Is Halloween (single) (Lazy Meadow Music)
- Gentle Hen - The Whole Point of the Trip (Rub Wrongways Records)
- Mystics Anonymous - Dining and Lodging (Centerlight)

=== 2024 ===
- J Mascis - What Do We Do Now (Sub Pop)
- Mark Mulcahy - The Tinsler EP (Mezzotint)
- Pierce Woodward - Against the Strong Water (self-released)
- Mark Mulcahy - You Can See the Future EP (Mezzotint)
