= Tao Rodríguez-Seeger =

American musician (born 1972)

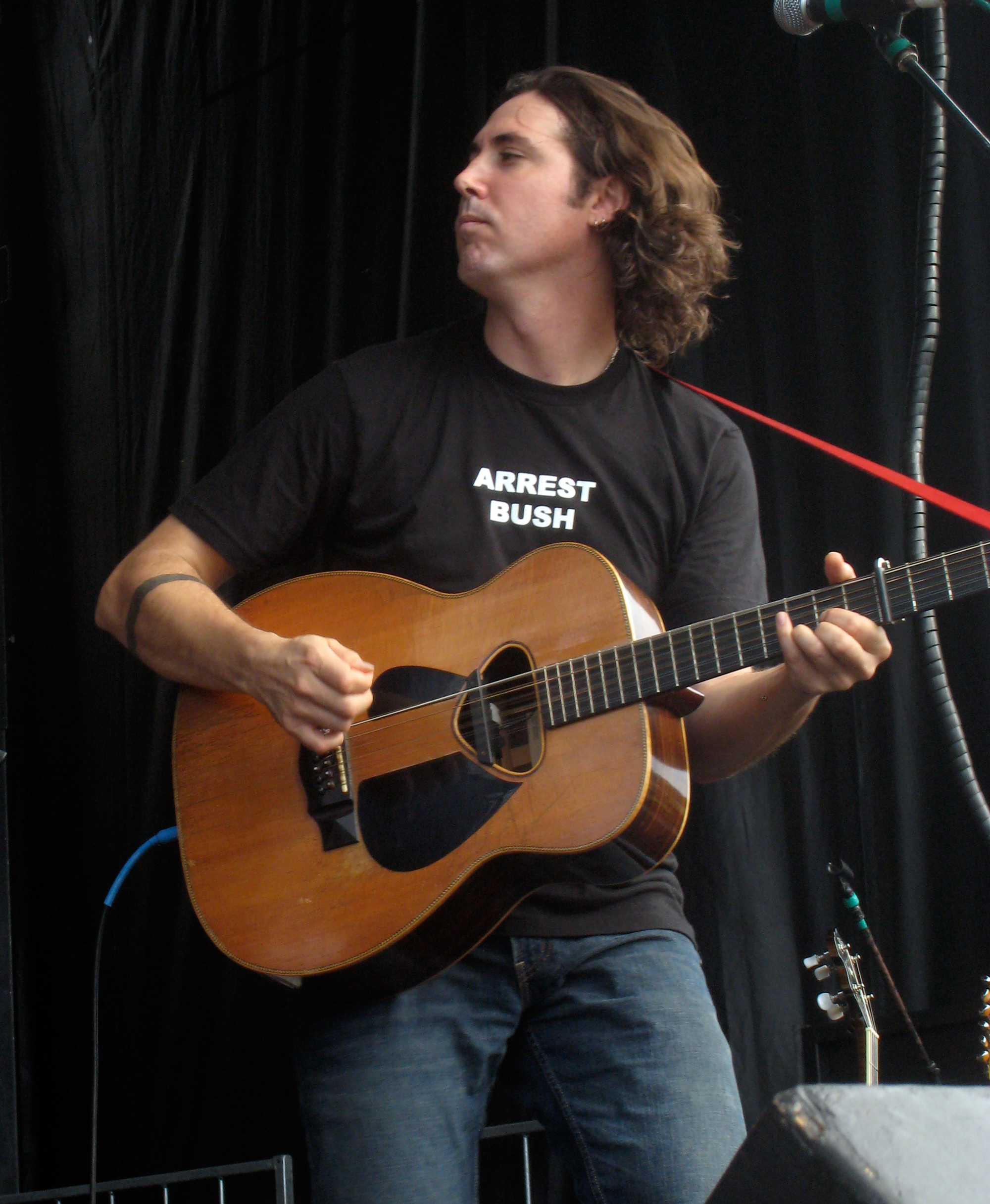
- Rodriguez-Seeger performing in 2007

Background information
- Born: 1972 (age 53–54); Poughkeepsie, New York, U.S.
- Genres: Folk; folk rock; old-time music
- Occupation: Musician
- Instruments: Banjo; guitar; harmonica; vocals
- Years active: 1986–present
- Formerly of: The Mammals
- Website: The Mammals.net

Tao Rodríguez-Seeger (born 1972) is an American contemporary folk musician. A founder of the Mammals, he is the grandson of folk musician Pete Seeger. He plays banjo, guitar, harmonica and sings in English and Spanish.

== Biography ==
Rodríguez-Seeger is the son of Mika Seeger and Emilio Rodríguez, a Puerto Rican filmmaker. After his father was invited by the Sandinistas to document the nation's civil war, Seeger spent nine years of his childhood in Nicaragua.

In 1986, Rodríguez-Seeger started performing with his grandfather, Pete Seeger. In 1999 he was a member of the band RIG, with Sarah Lee Guthrie and Johnny Irion. In 2001, he founded the Mammals with Michael Merenda and Ruth Ungar. In 2006 he recorded an album, ¡Que vaya bien!, with Puerto Rican folk singers Roy Brown and Tito Auger of the Puerto Rican rock band Fiel a la vega and he formed the Anarchist Orchestra (now known as the Tao Rodriguez-Seeger band) with Jacob Silver, also of the Mammals, Laura Cortese and Robin McMillan.

Seeger had a radio show, The Tao of Tao, on WAMC.

=== Barack Obama inaugural celebration ===
On January 18, 2009, Seeger performed with his grandfather Pete Seeger, Bruce Springsteen and a youth chorus at the We Are One Inaugural Celebration of President Barack Obama. They sang Woody Guthrie's famous song "This Land Is Your Land" during the finale, before an audience estimated at 400,000. The performance included two of Guthrie's original verses to the song that have often been omitted; one verse mentions "private property" and the other refers to a depression era relief office.

On October 21, 2011, Seeger was part of The Pete Seeger March which walked in solidarity with Occupy Wall Street to Columbus Circle. There he performed with his grandfather Pete Seeger, Arlo Guthrie, David Amram, and other musicians.

== Discography ==
=== With the Mammals ===
- Born Live (2001);
- Evolver (2002);
- Migration (EP)(2004);
- Rock That Babe (2004);
- Departure (2006).

=== With Roy Brown and Tito Auger ===
- Que Vaya Bien (2006)

=== With the Anarchist Orchestra/the Tao Rodriguez-Seeger Band ===
- The Anarchist Orchestra (EP) (2006)

=== With the Tao Seeger Band ===
- Rise and Bloom (2010)
