= Olga Bellin =

American actress (1929–1987)

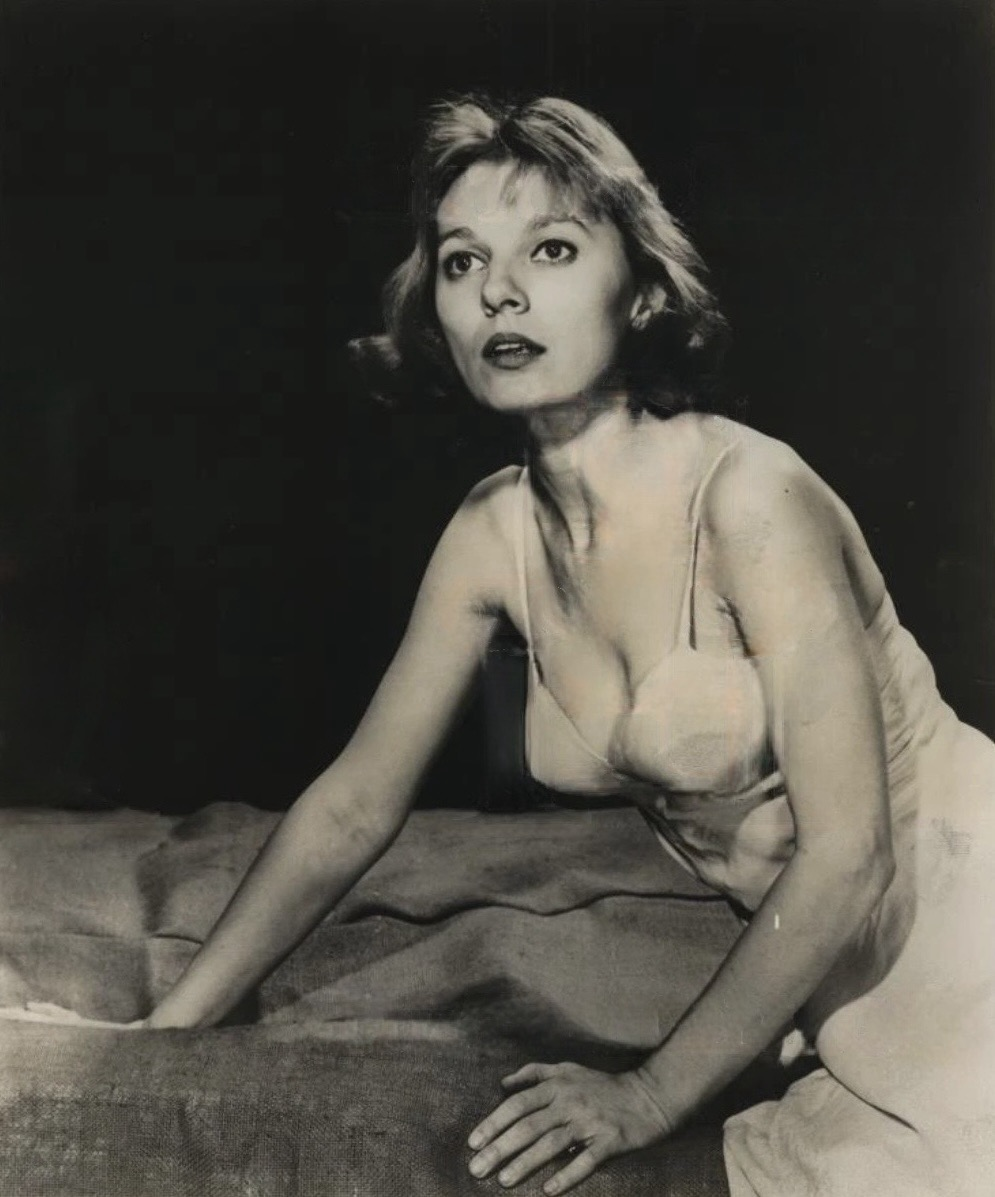
- Bellin in 1958
- Born: Olga Bielinska; August 17, 1933; Milwaukee, Wisconsin
- Died: November 8, 1987 (aged 54); New York City, U.S.
- Other names: Olga Winters, Olga Bielinski
- Education: Milwaukee-Downer College
- Occupation: Actress
- Years active: 1948–1984
- Known for: Tomorrow (1972)
- Spouse: Paul Roebling (m. 1958)
- Children: 1

Olga Bellin (born Olga Bielinska; August 17, 1933 – November 8, 1987), also known as Olga Winters, was a Polish-born American actress who worked primarily in theater and television, but is best known for her sole big screen credit, as Robert Duvall's co-star in the critically acclaimed Faulkner adaptation, Tomorrow. She also played Margaret Roper—née More, daughter of Paul Scofield's Thomas More–in the original Broadway production of A Man for All Seasons and played the lead in HB Studio's The House of Mirth, adapted from Edith Wharton's like-named novel.

== Early life and career ==
Born in 1929 to Polish emigres Walter Bielinska and Helen Jarzembinski, Bellin attended Milwaukee-Downer College, graduating Phi Beta Kappa in 1951. By that point, Bellin had, since 1949, performed extensively in summer stock with Milwaukee's Tower Ranch Tent-House Theatre, in such roles as Mrs. Bramson in Night Must Fall, Amanda Wingfield in The Glass Menagerie, O'Neill's Anna Christie, Shaw's Candida, Billie Dawn in Born Yesterday, Kate Keller in All My Sons, Alma Winemiller in Summer and Smoke, and Amanda in Noël Coward's Private Lives. Following her graduation, Bellin received a scholarship to study dance with Martha Graham in New York, where she would also study acting with Uta Hagen at the Herbert Berghof Studio.

Beginning in January 1954 and continuing for approximately 18 months, Bielinska performed under the name Olga Winters, both in New York and in Ontario, giving well-received lead performances in plays such as Gigi, The Philadelphia Story, The Hasty Heart, Dear Barbarians, and A Streetcar Named Desire. One of her chief colleagues during this period, Canadian director/voice actor Vern Chapman, later recalled their collaboration.

I was fortunate to have in the first show Jill Foster, Diane Vickers, Bernard Slade, Warren Hart, and a splendid, sensitive young actress, Olga Winters, who was studying with Uta Hagen at the Herbert Berghoff Studio in New York. Originally from Wisconsin, her real name was Olga Bielinska, a beautiful name worthy of a ballerina but one which Olga thought would be too restricting in Manhattan theatre agents’ offices. Here was an actress who knew how to act in depth without sitting around for weeks analyzing the character and all its relatives for generations back. Even in the lightest of comedy, Olga managed to imbue rather surface characters, as written, with a depth that made them more believable.

In 1962, Bellin received the Charlotte Cushman Award as "the year's best actress in a non-featured role" for her portrayal of Margaret More in A Man for All Seasons.

One viewer who was particularly struck by Bellin's performance in Tomorrow, Horton Foote's adaptation of the like-named short story from Knight's Gambit, is Faulkner biographer Carl Rollyson.

Bellin seems to play Sarah perfectly. Without histrionics she is plain spoken and reserved, in spite of the lengthy speech she must deliver. Bellin clearly and confidently acts the role of a proud, independent woman, who has never asked for anyone's help. In her self-reliance, her suppressed tenderness, and loneliness she again resembles Fentry. Out of her isolation, she peaks to the isolation in him. This moment in the film is a revelation for Sarah, for Fentry, and for the viewer. There is nothing like it in the short story, which depends for the most part upon retrospective summary of events, and brief but vivid description and dialogue. Neither Fentry nor Sarah has any self-pity; Sarah cries but does not sentimentalize her grief. They are a perfect match, so much so that Fentry is willing to admit to feelings that he would not usually acknowledge [...] perhaps even to himself.

In 1984, Bellin starred in the professional premiere of William Luce's Zelda, his one-woman show about the latter days of Zelda Fitzgerald, directed by Bellin's husband and staged at the American Place Theater. In his review, Record theater critic Robert Foldberg detected "little new insight" in the play itself yet found the performance "quite affecting."

Bellin's portrayal is so intensely touching that the familiar often becomes fresh. [...] Whatever the cause of Zelda's agony, it is harrowingly portrayed by Bellin. Her performance is sensitive but unyielding in its depiction of Zelda's mental anguish.

== Personal life and death ==
In May 1958, Bellin married fellow Herbert Berghof alumnus Paul Roebling. They had one child, a son, Kristian (Kriss Roebling).

On November 8, 1987, approximately two years after being diagnosed, Bellin died of cancer at age 54 in New York City. She was survived by her son and her husband, Paul Roebling, who would take his own life seven years later.

== Filmography ==
Olga Bellin film and television credits
Year	Title	Role	Notes
1957	United States Steel Hour	Pepe's Mother	Episode: "The Little Bullfighter" (S4.E20)
1958	Camera Three		Episode: "Notes from the Underground: Part 3" (S4.E5)
1959	The Edge of Night	Peggy Collins	2 episodes
1959	The Play of the Week	Vera	Episode: "A Month in the Country" (S1.E5)
1960	Look Up and Live	Sonia	Episode: "The Perilous Adventure, Part II: The Guilty Man" (1960-02-14)
1960	CBS Repertoire Workshop	Tanya	Episode: "The Seven Who Were Hanged" (S2.E9)
1961	Naked City	Jeannie Clinton	Episode: "A Hole in the City" (S2.E13)
1962	Armstrong Circle Theatre	Ilsa Daum	Episode: "The Assassin" (S13.E6)
1963	Golden Showcase	Juliet	Episode: "Romeos and Juliets – A Theme with Variations" (1963-10-31)
1963	Route 66	Min Kronberg	Episode: "93 Percent in Smiling" (S4.E12)
1964	The Doctors and the Nurses	Mrs. Hartman	Episode: "Nurse Is a Feminine Noun" (S2.E21)
1964	Another World	Ann Fuller	2 episodes
1965	The Holy Terror	The Holy Terror Elizabeth Herbert	TV movie. Hallmark Hall of Fame
1966	The Doctors and the Nurses	Ann Fuller	1 episode
1972	Tomorrow	Sarah Eubanks	Film
1984	The Shakers: Hands to Work, Hearts to God	Herself (voice)	Documentary film by Ken Burns
1986	The Equalizer	Mrs. Winslow	Episode: "Joyride" (S2.E4)
