= Ruth Ungar =

American singer-songwriter

Ruth Ungar Merenda
- Ruth Ungar, Newport Folk Festival 2005

Background information
- Born: February 19, 1976 (age 50); Mt. Kisco, NY, United States
- Genres: folk, folk rock, old time music
- Instruments: fiddle, guitar, banjo, ukulele, vocals, songwriter
- Member of: Mike + Ruthy, The Mammals, Sometymes Why
- Website: http://mikeandruthy.com

Ruth Ungar Merenda was born February 19, 1976, in Mount Kisco, New York. She is a singer-songwriter and multi-instrumentalist who plays fiddle, ukulele and guitar. She is the daughter of fiddler/composer Jay Ungar and singer Lyn Hardy and a graduate of Bard College in Annandale-on-Hudson, New York.

Her song Four Blue Walls, inspired by the play Danny and the Deep Blue Sea by John Patrick Shanley was recorded by Canadian band The Duhks, on their eponymous 2005 album produced by Béla Fleck and Gary Paczosa. Her song Simple and Sober was recorded by Lindsay Lou on her 2018 album Southland.^{[1]}

Ungar resides in the Hudson Valley of New York State with her husband Michael J. Merenda, Jr and their two children, Willy and Opal Merenda. The couple produce a bi-annual music festival at the Ashokan Center called The Hoot which they launched in 2013.

== Bands ==
Ungar and Merenda perform as the duo Mike + Ruthy and as founding members of the folk-rock band The Mammals. They also both appear with the Jay Ungar and Molly Mason Family Band.

From 2005 to 2009 Ungar also recorded and performed in the trio Sometymes Why (2005–2009) with Kristin Andreassen of Uncle Earl and Aoife O'Donovan of Crooked Still.

== Discography ==
=== Solo ===
- Jukebox (2002)

=== The Mammals ===
- Born Live (2001)
- Evolver (2002)
- Migration (EP) (2004)
- Rock That Babe (2004)
- Departure (2006)
- Sunshiner (2018)

=== Sometymes Why ===
- Sometymes Why (2005)
- Your Heart is a Glorious Machine (2009)

=== Mike + Ruthy ===
- The Honeymoon Agenda (2008)
- Waltz of the Chickadee (2009)
- Million to One (2010)
- The NYC EP (2012)

=== The Mike + Ruthy Band ===
- Bright as You Can (2015)

=== Dances ===
At the age of twelve, she wrote the Contra dance The Wizard's Walk. It is set to music by the same name composed by her father Jay Ungar.
