= Tomorrow (1972 film) =

1972 film directed by Joseph Anthony

- Directed by: Joseph Anthony
- Written by: Story: William Faulkner; Screenplay & Play: Horton Foote
- Produced by: Gilbert Pearlman; Paul Roebling
- Starring: Robert Duvall; Olga Bellin
- Cinematography: Allan Green
- Edited by: Reva Schlesinger
- Music by: Irwin Stahl
- Distributed by: Filmgroup Productions
- Release date: 9 April 1972 (US)
- Running time: 103 minutes
- Country: United States
- Language: English

Tomorrow is a 1972 American Southern Gothic drama film directed by Joseph Anthony and starring Robert Duvall and Olga Bellin. The screenplay was written by Horton Foote, adapted from a play he wrote for Playhouse 90 that was itself based on a 1940 short story by William Faulkner in the short story collection Knight's Gambit. The PG-rated film was filmed in the Mississippi counties of Alcorn and Itawamba. Although released in 1972, it saw limited runs in the U.S. until re-released about ten years later. Duvall called the film one of his personal favorites.

== Plot ==
An isolated and lonely farmer named Fentry, in rural Mississippi takes in a pregnant drifter who has been abandoned by the father of her child. Told in flashback, twenty years later, the farmer is on a jury and the film, narrated by the defense attorney in the case, explores why he is the lone guilty vote in the trial of a man who killed a man most people considered worthless and of no account. In a steady and methodic fashion, it is revealed the victim was the son of Sarah Eubanks, the pregnant drifter, with whom Fentry had had an intense personal involvement after he found her in a destitute state and nursed her back to health. She later died, after he had promised he'd take care of her son. He raised the boy for a time, but the boy was taken from him by force by the brothers of the boy's mother. Their poor upbringing led to the boy becoming a man whom people held in such low regard that his murder was regarded as a public service. Fentry remembers only the child he'd cherished and nurtured, and can't accept his death being treated as an event of no significance. The attorney looks at Fentry, and realizes this is someone society treats as insignificant, but who is actually a person of tremendous character and determination, like so many others who die unnoticed: “The lowly and invincible of the earth—to endure and endure and then endure, tomorrow and tomorrow and tomorrow.”

== Main cast ==
- Robert Duvall as Jackson Fentry
- Olga Bellin as Sarah Eubanks
- Sudie Bond as Mrs. Hulie
- Richard McConnell as Isham Russell
- Peter Masterson as Douglas
- Johnny Mask as Jackson
- William Hawley as Papa Fentry
- James Franks as Preacher Whitehead

== Production ==
The opening courthouse scenes of Tomorrow were shot at the historic Jacinto Courthouse in Alcorn County, Mississippi. The courthouse, built in 1854, has been refurbished and is listed in the National Register of Historic Places. The majority of the film was shot in the Bounds Crossroads community of Itawamba County, at the sawmill on the farm of Chester Russell, the grandfather of singer Tammy Wynette (Virginia Wynette Pugh), who lived most of her young years there with her grandparents until she married in 1960. The sawmill building, where much of the film was shot, was built just for the film. Chester Russell played one of the jurors and can be seen when the jury is deliberating in the opening courthouse scenes. Some of the film props were also leased from James Franks Antique Museum of Tupelo, Mississippi.

== Release ==
The film opened at the 68th Street Playhouse in New York City and only played 32 playdates around the United States. It was re-released in June 1978 at The Public Theater in New York City.

=== Critical reception ===
The film was praised by Rex Reed, Gene Shalit, Archer Winsten and Jeffrey Lyons, with Reed stating that he believed it was the best depiction of Faulkner ever screened. Vincent Canby of The New York Times overall did not care for the film but acknowledged it was well-intentioned:

[T]he Horton Foote screenplay is less an adaptation than an enlargement, in the playwright's dumbest, television-fake literary style of the 1950s. Tomorrow is not one of Faulkner's most interesting works... Mr. Foote's attempts at pretty po' fo'k dialogue come very close to the ludicrous... Even if the movie's intentions are decent, as reflected in the accurate look of the production, filmed in Mississippi, the effect is mostly patronizing.

In the annual Leonard Maltin's Movie Guide, the film was rated 3½ stars, noting that "Bellin is excellent. Duvall astonishingly good in best-ever screen presentation of the author's work".

== See also ==
- List of American films of 1972
