= Marykate O'Neil =

American singer-songwriter (born 1968)

- Born: May 18, 1968 (age 58); Hudson, Massachusetts, U.S.
- Genres: Pop
- Occupations: Singer, songwriter
- Instruments: Vocals, guitar
- Label: Nettwerk
- Website: Official website

Marykate O'Neil (born 1968) is an American indiepop singer-songwriter and visual artist from Massachusetts, currently based in New York City. Known for her quirky, literate pop sensibilities, she has released four solo albums and several singles to critical acclaim. Her work has been hailed as "witty, angsty goodness", and "pure magic".

== Early life ==
Born in Hudson, Massachusetts in 1968, O'Neil began singing in school assemblies as a shy fourth-grader at Forest Avenue Elementary School in Hudson. She was elected president of her senior class at Hudson High, where she performed in school plays and musicals. She earned a bachelor's degree in 1990 from Boston University as a dual major in philosophy and psychology, and completed a Juris Doctor in 1994 at the University of Connecticut.

== Career ==
O'Neil began singing and playing guitar in the indie-pop group piewackit while she was attending college in Boston. Although the band had a deal with I.R.S. Records and was playing shows with Ida, Mary Lou Lord, Juliana Hatfield, Lois, and Elliott Smith, piewackit disbanded, and O'Neil moved to New York City in 1997.

In 2002, she recorded her self-titled debut album. The record caught on with fans of literate pop, and reached the Top 10 of the CMJ college radio charts. Marykate O'Neil was included on CMJ's "Best of 2002" list, and three songs from the album were covered by Japanese film and television star Tomoyo Harada.

Her independently self-released followup album, 1-800-Bankrupt, was soon picked up by the Nettwerk music group in North America and by MVS Records in France. Both labels re-released it in 2006, broadening O'Neil's exposure. Also in 2006, her song "Mundane Dream" was featured in the Sundance award-winning film Stephanie Daley starring Tilda Swinton, Amber Tamblyn, and Timothy Hutton.

The making of 1-800-Bankrupt continued the trend of O'Neil enlisting many of the likeminded musicians and writers she had befriended along the way to participate. Among them: Matthew Caws (of Nada Surf), Jim Boggia, Lianne Smith, Ken Maiuri (of Pedro the Lion and The Soft Drugs), Brad Jones (a bassist and producer working with Josh Rouse, Marshall Crenshaw and many others); and the album's co-producers: Roger Moutenot (who's worked with Yo La Tengo and Sleater-Kinney) and Jill Sobule, who co-wrote (and performed on) several songs on the album. Sobule and O'Neil had first met in the '90s when both piewackit and Sobule were playing a festival in Los Angeles along with Frente! and The Murmurs.

O'Neil is known for her DIY ethic and typically records tracks at home, as well as doing her own album artwork. She also works is a visual artist, creating paintings, collages and graphic design work. Since 2021, she has exhibited her art in solo and group juried shows in galleries and museums nationwide, and in online project spaces. Her art credits also include the cover art for Monster Protest Jamz (Volume 1), a 2016 project organized by Jill Sobule – a compilation album of various artists performing protest songs for social change. The artwork was inspired by 1970s K-Tel LPs and latter-day Now That's What I Call Music! compilations.

== Discography ==
=== piewackit ===
- sockmonkee (1997, Rock-It Records; Space Chicken Records) - produced by Michael Deming (Lilys, Apples in Stereo, The Pernice Brothers)
- "boyfriend" 7" single (1997, Aargh Records)
- "prime time" 7" single (1997, Aargh Records)
- "Tattoo" - featured on Somewhere Between Heaven and Xanax cassette compilation (1995, Pop Narcotic; Casseil Records)

=== Solo ===
- Marykate O'Neil (2002, 71 Recordings), produced by Michael Deming & Jill Sobule
- 1-800-Bankrupt (2006, 71 Recordings), produced by Roger Moutenot & Jill Sobule
- mkULTRA (EP) (2008, Nettwerk/71 Recordings), produced by Marykate O'Neil, Roger Moutenot & Jill Sobule
- Underground (2009, Nettwerk/71 Recordings), produced by Marykate O'Neil, Jacob Lawson, Roger Moutenot, & Jill Sobule

=== Compilation tracks ===
- "Pleasant Valley Sunday" on Through The Looking Glass: Indie Pop Plays The Monkees (2000) and Indie Pop Dance Party (2001) (both: Planting Seeds Records)
- "Mundane Dream" on Dreaming Up the Perfect Pop (2002, Planting Seeds Records)
- "Getting Out of Bed" on Redeye Distribution Fall Sampler 2002 (Redeye USA)
- "Get Down (Gilbert O'Sullivan song) on Right to Chews: Bubblegum Classics Revisited (2002, Not Lame Records)
- "Today" on Zombies of the Stratosphere (2002, Logan Tapes - Germany)
- "Another Saturday" on Mars 2003 (Les Inrockuptibles - issue no. 383)
- "Traffic Jam" on What a Concept!: Tribute to Teenage Fanclub, (2004, Not Lame Records)
- "Stay" on Pssst! - Spring 2006 (Filter)
- "Green Street" on Landmark Music: Fall 2008 (Landmark Theatres/Filter)

International Pop Overthrow CD series (all: Not Lame Records):

- "Mundane Dream" on Vol. 4 (2001)
- "Still Waiting" on Vol. 5 (2002)
- "You'll Be Sorry" on Vol. 7 (2004)
- "Susan Fingerle" on Vol. 9 (2006)

== Music videos ==
- "Nashville" , off Underground, directed by Michael K. Anderson
- "I Sleep With My Clothes On" , off 1-800-Bankrupt, directed by Marianne Petit
- "Past All The Stars" , off 1-800-Bankrupt, directed by Marianne Petit. This video was featured in a 2006 IFC short film series.
- "The Sky Is Falling" , off 1-800-Bankrupt, directed by Marianne Petit
- "Secret War" , off 1-800-Bankrupt, directed by Craig Eastland
- "Secret War" live from the Living Room in NYC, April 12, 2007
- "Green Street" live from World Cafe Live in Philadelphia, October 9, 2008, by Frantone

== Selected press ==
- Artist spotlight & interview from NewBeats, 2002
- Review of Marykate O'Neil from Splendid E-Zine, Jul. 23, 2002
- Review of 1-800-Bankrupt from Filter Magazine, May 2, 2006
- "My Favorite Things" feature article on PopMatters, Jun. 7, 2006
- Feature in Worcester Telegram, Jul. 7, 2007
- Single review of 'Green Street' (off Underground) in the Boston Globe, Oct. 7, 2008
- Interview feature in the Cambridge Chronicle, Oct. 10, 2008
- "Under the Radar" feature on Metromix, Dec. 19, 2008
- Underground included in Most Anticipated Albums of '09 from Blurt, Jan. 02, 2009
- Review of Underground from Allmusic
- Review of Underground from Sentimentalist Magazine, Feb. 3, 2009
- Feature in the Hudson Sun, Feb. 4, 2009
