= Old-time photography =

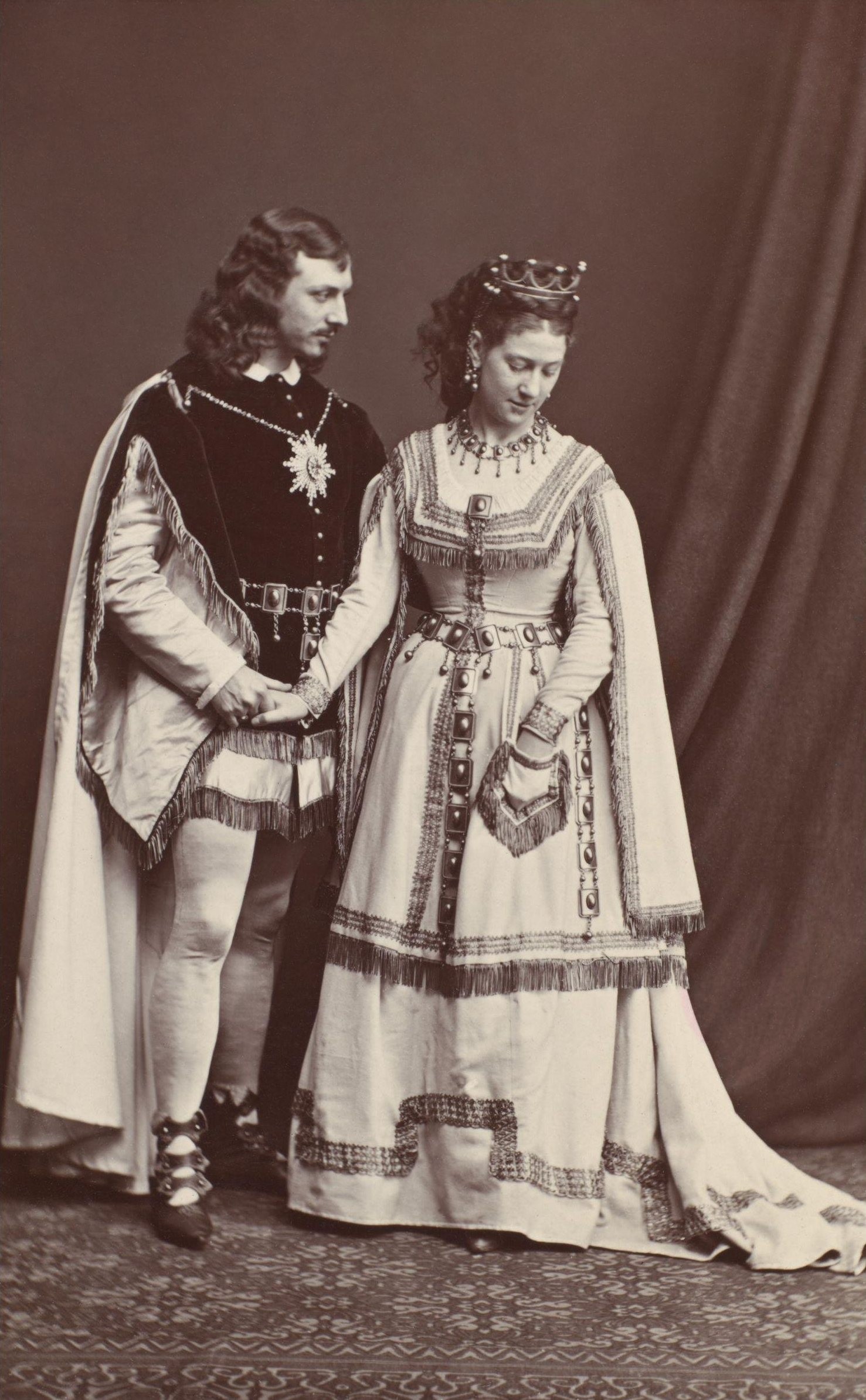
W.H. Kendal as Prince Philamir and Madge Robertson (a.k.a. Madge Kendal) as Princess Zeolide in W.S. Gilbert's The Palace of Truth, original 1870 production. 9.3cm x 5.7cm

Old-time photography, also known as antique and amusement photography, is a genre of novelty photography.

Old-time photography allows consumers to pose as if for an antique photo in costumes and props from a particular period, sometimes printed in sepia tone to give the photo a vintage look.

Popular themes include the Old West, the Victorian era, or the Roaring Twenties.

Some studios specialize in the genre, and others ply their trade at festivals and historical reenactment events. It is a popular family activity at amusement parks and other tourist destinations, mostly in the United States. Many of these old-time photography studios are located in historic cities that naturally draw visitors looking to experience how people lived in past eras. Some photo booths will do sepia toned prints for a similar look.

Photographers in the genre originally used specialized Agfa and later Polaroid equipment, but have largely moved to digital photography along with the industry.
