= Evolver (The Mammals album) =

Studio album by the Mammals
- Released: November 19, 2002
- Genre: Folk
- Length: 61:03
- Label: Humble Abode Music
- Producers: The Mammals, Max Feldman

The Mammals chronology
Born Live (2002)	Evolver (2002)	Rock That Babe (2004)

Evolver is the debut studio album by folk supergroup the Mammals, released on November 19, 2002, by Humble Abode Music.

Evolver is the band's first studio album and the second released, along with the live compilation album Born Live (2001). It was recorded at Humble Abode Music by Max Feldman with guest appearances by Ken Maiuri, Jay Ungar, Pete Seeger and more.

== Critical reception ==
Professional ratings
Review scores
Source	Rating
AllMusic	3/5 stars

AllMusic editor Zac Johnson called it "a warmly inviting collection of original tunes and updated traditionals", despite pushing the "rock-style drumming" throughout the album, saying it "stands as a fine document of these musicians' accomplishments in the studio and points to fine futures for all involved."

== Track listing ==
1. "Way Down the Old Plank Road" Traditional - 2:29
2. "House Carpenter/Pipeline" Rodriguez, Seeger ... - 4:30
3. "69 Pleasant St." Merenda - 4:06
4. "John Brown's Dream" Traditional - 4:05
5. "1952 Vincent Black Lightning Thompson - 4:16
6. 'Lady Margaret" Traditional - 3:55
7. "Stairway to the Stars" Malneck, Parish, Signorelli - 2:39
8. "Wandering Boy" Merenda, Traditional - 2:36
9. "Chinese Irishman" Rodriguez, Seeger - 3:09
10. "Infinity Medley: Hook 'N' Line/Martha Campbell/Yellow Barber/Shiverin'" Merenda, Traditional - 10:45
11. "Profit" Merenda, Ungar - 3:52
12. "City Never Sleeps" Ungar - 4:26
13. "Haircut Money" Merenda, Ungar - 3:34
14. "Industrial Park" Eisenhower, James, Rodriguez ... - 6:01
