= Molly Mason =

American musician and composer

- Born: Washington, US
- Instruments: Bass Guitar, Violin
- Member of: Jay and Molly
- Spouse: Jay Ungar

Molly Mason is an American musician and composer who performs as the duo Jay & Molly with her husband Jay Ungar. Jay's composition, Ashokan Farewell, became the title theme of Ken Burns' The Civil War on PBS. The soundtrack won a Grammy and Ashokan Farewell was nominated for an Emmy.

Mason grew up in Washington state. She plays traditional American fiddle and acoustic bass guitar. She is married to Jay Ungar, whom she had first met during the late 1970s in Beacon, New York while performing. Jay & Molly continue to perform as a duo, with their band, Swingology, and as the Jay Ungar and Molly Mason Family Band with Jay's daughter Ruth Ungar (her mother is Lyn Hardy) and Ruth's husband Michael Merenda.

In 1992, Ungar and Mason provided the soundtrack to the acclaimed documentary film Brother's Keeper, released as a music CD entitled Waltzing with You (1998).

They have contributed soundtracks to several of Ken Burns documentaries.

They have performed on Great Performances, A Prairie Home Companion, All Things Considered. They have also performed at the White House for two sitting Presidents, as well as having performed for Jimmy Carter after his term.

In 2006, they headlined the Northwest Folklife Festival in Seattle.
