= American Heritage Lyceum Philharmonic =

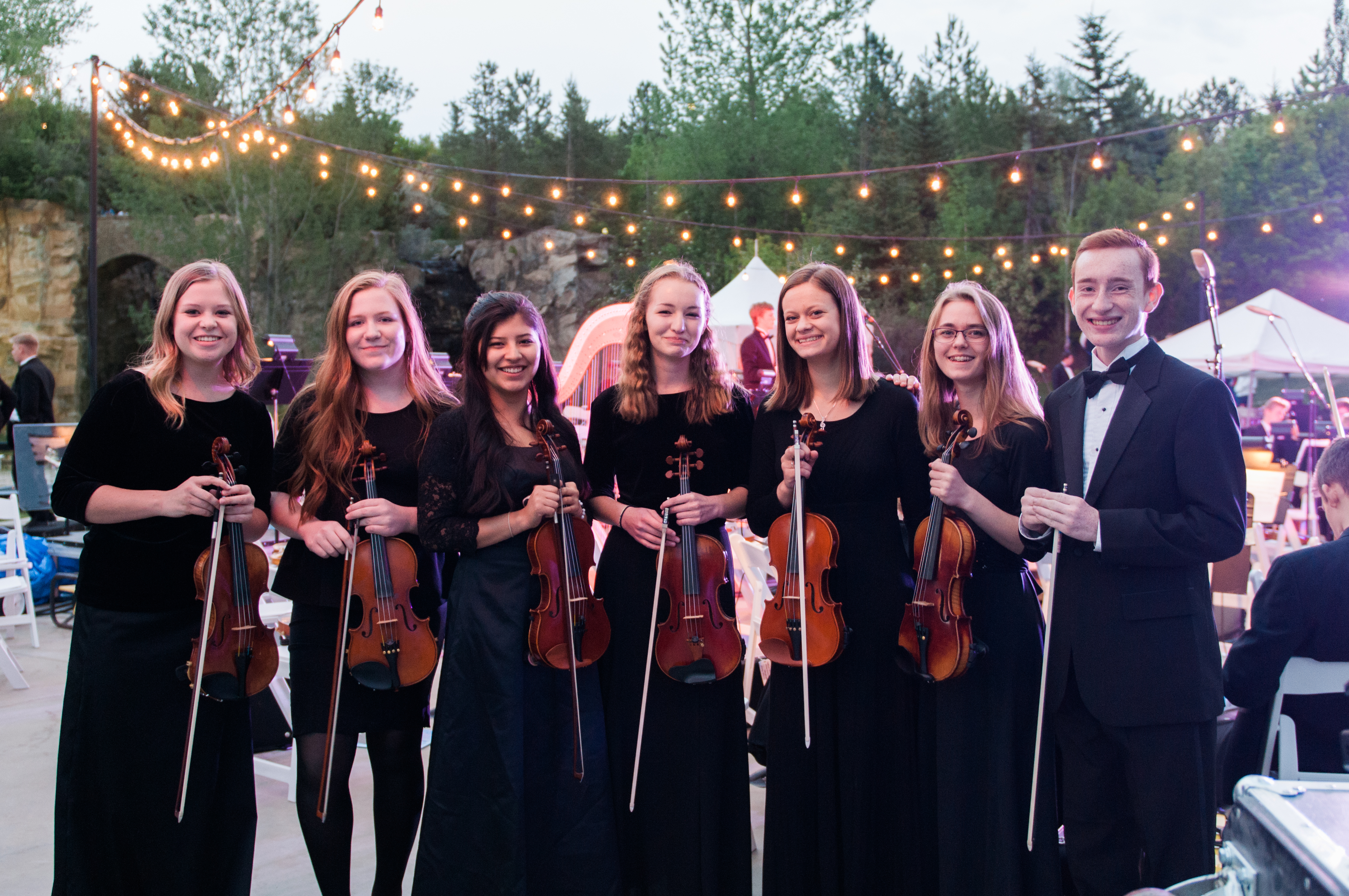
Simply Three Concert in 2017

The American Heritage Lyceum Philharmonic is an audition-only ensemble for advanced high-school-aged musicians. Students perform masterworks of the repertory alongside sacred music. The philharmonic was named the "Best Youth Performing Ensemble" by Best of State Utah in 2009 to 2015. Lyceum Philharmonic is one of the nation's premier youth orchestras. Located in American Fork, Utah, the group is led by conductor Kayson Brown.

In 2011, the Lyceum Philharmonic made its YouTube debut in the music video for "Beethoven's 5 Secrets" by The Piano Guys. The video has had over 100 million views as of March 2020.

== Recordings ==
- Hearts & Minds: released November 2011. This is the orchestra's first commercial album recorded in Abravanel Hall featuring guest artists Jenny Oaks Baker, Dallyn Vail Bayles, and Jordan Bluth, is available through Deseret Book Stores throughout the United States.
- The Piano Guys Live from Red Butte Gardens: concert performance with the Piano Guys released December 2012 on PBS.
- A second album featuring only the orchestra was scheduled to be released Spring 2014.

== Events ==
In 2012, the Lyceum Philharmonic was also featured in the Public Broadcasting Service (PBS) Special: The Piano Guys.

In 2013, the Lyceum Philharmonic played in the Days of '47 annual concert.

The group also played in the Muzart Foundation "We are Hope" concert in November 2013.

The orchestra has played with renowned guest artists such as: Jenny Oaks Baker, The Five Browns, Paul Cardall, Alex Boye, David Archuleta, Peter Breinholt, Mark Wood, and Jackie Evancho, among others.

== Director ==
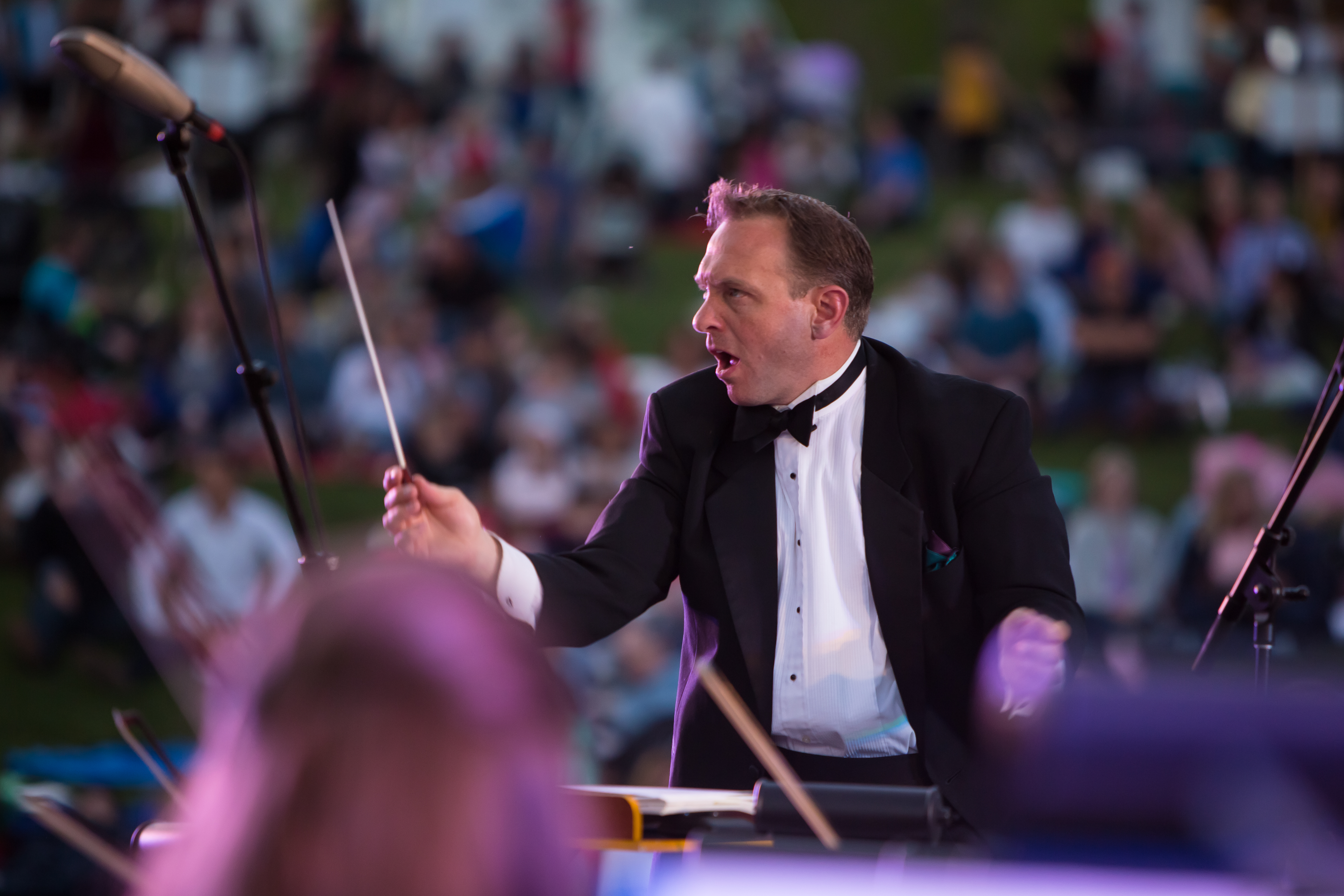
Kayson Brown directing Lyceum Philharmonic at Simply Three Concert in 2017

Kayson Brown completed a master's degree in orchestral conducting from Brigham Young University (BYU). He has directed over 25 orchestras including the Omaha Symphony, Round Rock Symphony, all five orchestras at Brigham Young University, The University of Utah Philharmonia, New Music Ensemble, Cleveland Institute of Music Orchestra, Brevard Music Center Orchestra, Savior of the World pit orchestra, The Pearl Awards Orchestra, Pleasant Grove Civic Symphony, Celebration Chamber Orchestra, and Student Honors Orchestras in Salt Lake and Cache Counties

== History ==
The Lyceum Chamber Ensemble was founded in 1987 by Denise Willey. Under her direction, they performed side by side the Utah Symphony and the Utah Valley Symphony. In 2006, The Lyceum Chamber Ensemble was acquired by The Music School in American Fork and became the Lyceum Repertory Orchestra. Director Kayson Brown added winds and brass to the core of strings existent in the chamber orchestra. The American Heritage School, based in American Fork, UT acquired the program in 2008 when The Music School closed.

== Concerts and guest artists ==
2012–2013 season:

- The Piano Guys at Red Butte Gardens
- A Time of Forgiving: The Christmas Musical. Music and lyrics by Paul “Cactus Jack” LA MARR
- Lyceum Philharmonic One Nation Tour. Performances at American Heritage School (American Fork, UT), Tuacahn Center for the Arts (St. George, UT), Las Vegas Academy of Performing Arts (Las Vegas, NV), Mesa Arts Center (Mesa, AZ), Snow College (Ephraim, UT)
- Peter Breinholt and Lyceum Philharmonic at Thanksgiving Point
- The Days of ’47 KUTV Pops Concert performed at Abravanel Hall (SLC, UT)

2015:

- World Congress of Families IX (SLC, UT)
