= Ashokan Center =

Coordinates: 41°55′46″N 74°12′8″W

- Ashokan Field Campus Historic District
- U.S. National Register of Historic Places
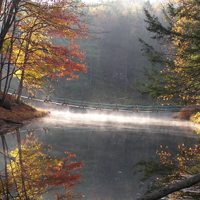
- The Wiggly Bridge

- Location within New York Location within the United States
- Location: Olive Bridge, New York
- Area: 385 acres (156 ha)
- Built: 18th century-1967
- Website: www.ashokancenter.org
- NRHP reference No.: 100003622
- Added to NRHP: 16 April 2019

The Ashokan Center (formerly the Ashokan Field Campus, listed on the National Register of Historic Places (NRHP) as the Ashokan Field Campus Historic District, is a 385-acre (156-hectare) outdoor education, conference, and retreat center located in the Catskill Mountains of New York. Schools have explored and been inspired by Ashokan's forests, waterfalls, stream-fed ponds, and open meadows since 1967. Music camps, blacksmithing conferences, and retreat groups have called Ashokan home while schools are not in residence. The name Ashokan means "place of many fishes," or "where rushing waters meet" in the Lenape language.

The location was the inspiration for Jay Ungar's song "Ashokan Farewell", which was used as the theme music for PBS's The Civil War. In 2019 it was listed on the National Register of Historic Places.

== History ==
The first homesteaders on the land were a third generation Dutchman named Jacobus Bush and his wife, Eycke Vandermerke, born in Marbletown, Ulster County, New York in 1692 and 1687 respectively. Jacobus Jr. and his wife Annetje Merkel recorded their ownership on a deed of remembrance in 1732. In 1755, his brother Thomas and his wife's sister Elizabeth built a homestead a few hundred yards up the road. This is the house from which his son Fredrick's children were kidnapped by Tory-inspired Indians. Thomas was an outspoken proponent of the patriot cause. This was the frontier during the American Revolutionary War and it was a common practice for Tories and their Indian allies to raid frontier homes. It had become such a problem that General Washington authorized the building of a fort at Shokan, now under the waters of the Ashokan Reservoir.

The property was owned and operated by SUNY New Paltz's College Auxiliary Service as the Ashokan Field Campus from 1967 until 2008.

The land was sold in 2008 to the Open Space Conservancy, part of the Open Space Institute. The property was divided with a portion sold to the New York City Department of Environmental Protection and the rest to the non-profit Ashokan Foundation. The Ashokan Foundation continues to support and develop environmental education programs for schools in partnership with non-profit partner the Ashokan Center. Additionally Ashokan's Music & Dance Camps for adults and families have remained in continuous operation since 1980 and additional new arts programs are currently in the works.

== Geology ==
The story of Ashokan begins over 400 million years ago during the Devonian Period. The vastly swollen Esopus Creek struggled to find its present path through Ashokan which was well-blocked by glacial moraine. Winchell's Falls and Cathedral Gorge are relatively recent (past ten-thousand years) features. The newly uncovered till (glacial soil) was rocky and sterile, and much like northern Canada today. It was covered by tundra where feeding mammoths and other ice age mammals migrated along the un-crossable Esopus. As the climate continued to warm, the open landscape gave way to spruce and fir of the boreal forest. Mastodons and woodland caribou took over the trail blazing begun by earlier mammals. At some point during this time, the first people entered the area hunting the ice-age "mega-fauna". Evidence of these first people is scant in this area, but they undoubtedly followed the game trails along the Esopus.

== See also ==
- National Register of Historic Places listings in Ulster County, New York
