= Michael J. Merenda Jr. =

American singer-songwriter

- Michael (right) and Ruth Ungar Merenda in Woodstock, NY, 2007

Background information
- Born: 1976; Durham, New Hampshire, U.S.
- Genres: folk, folk rock, old time music
- Instrument(s): Guitar, banjo, ukulele, vocals, songwriter
- Member of: The Mammals

Michael J. Merenda Jr. is a singer-songwriter with the American folk band, the Mammals. He plays guitar, banjo, ukulele and percussion. He also has a solo career and performs with the Jay Ungar and Molly Mason Family Band.

== Biography ==
Merenda was born and grew up in Durham, New Hampshire, where his father is a faculty member at the University of New Hampshire. In 1998, he graduated with a creative writing degree from Bowdoin College in Maine and he then moved to New York City.

As a teenager Merenda started out playing guitar with the band Skarotum with his brother Chris. He started playing drums in elementary school, started playing the guitar in sixth grade and picked up the banjo after he met Ruth Ungar in 1998, daughter of Jay Ungar and Lyn Hardy. Merenda later married Ruth Ungar.

In 2000, Merenda moved to Western Massachusetts. In 2001, he, Ruth, and Tao Rodriguez-Seeger started The Mammals.

As well as being a member of the Mammals, Merenda has an active solo career with three CDs in his own name. He was supporting act for Dan Bern in November 2006. In 2008, he and Ruth released their first duo cd, The Honeymoon Agenda, on their own record label, Humble Abode Music.

== Discography ==
=== Solo ===
- Trapped in the Valley (2000)
- Election Day (2004)
- Quiver (2006)

=== Mike and Ruthy ===
- The Honeymoon Agenda (2008)
- Waltz of the Chickadee (2009)
- Million to One (2010)

=== With The Mammals ===
- Born Live (2001)
- Evolver (2002)
- Migration (EP)(2004)
- Rock That Babe (2004)
- Departure (2006)
