= Paul Roebling =

American actor

- Paul Roebling in Miami Vice 1984
- Born: March 1, 1934; Philadelphia, Pennsylvania, U.S.
- Died: July 27, 1994 (aged 60); Teec Nos Pos, Arizona, U.S.
- Occupations: Actor, Producer
- Spouse: Olga Bellin
- Children: 1

Paul Roebling (March 1, 1934 – July 27, 1994) was an American actor noted for Blue Thunder, Prince of the City and Carolina Skeletons. In the 1990 Ken Burns PBS documentary The Civil War, Roebling was the voice of Joshua Lawrence Chamberlain and read the famous letter written by Sullivan Ballou. He also directed his wife, Olga Bellin, in Zelda.

== Life ==
Roebling was a descendant of John Roebling and Washington Roebling, the designers and engineers of the Brooklyn Bridge. In Ken Burns' documentaries on the Brooklyn Bridge and the Civil War, Roebling was the voice of Washington Roebling.

Roebling died by suicide on July 27, 1994, in Teec Nos Pos, Arizona. His wife had died from cancer several years earlier. They had one child, a son, Kristian (Kriss Roebling). Kriss had two sons; Augustus and Patrick Chase Roebling.

== Awards ==
- Roebling won the 1962 Obie Award for Distinguished Performance by an Actor for his performance in This Side of Paradise.

== Filmography ==
Year	Title	Role	Notes
1981	Prince of the City	Assistant U.S. Atty. Brooks Paige	
1982	The End of August	Leonce	
1983	Blue Thunder	Icelan	
