= Jay Ungar =

American musician (born 1946)

- Born: November 14, 1946 (age 80); The Bronx, New York City, United States
- Occupations: American folk musician, composer
- Instruments: fiddle, mandolin

Jay Ungar (born November 14, 1946) is an American folk musician and composer.

== Life and career ==
Ungar was born in the Bronx, New York City. He frequented Greenwich Village music venues during his formative period in the 1960s. In the late 1960s, he became a member of Cat Mother and the All Night News Boys and later, the Putnam String County Band. Although he performs with David Bromberg, he is probably best known for "Ashokan Farewell" (1982), composed as a lament, and used as the theme tune to the Ken Burns documentary The Civil War (1990). Many of his other compositions are familiar as contradance tunes, notably "The Wizard's Walk".

In 1991, Ungar married fellow musician Molly Mason. They met during the 1970s. They continue to perform as a duo, with their band, Swingology, and as the Jay Ungar and Molly Mason Family Band with Jay's daughter and son-in-law, Ruth Ungar and Michael J. Merenda Jr.

In 1992, Ungar and Mason provided the soundtrack to the acclaimed documentary film Brother's Keeper, released as an album entitled Waltzing with You (1998). In 2006, the duo headlined the Northwest Folklife Festival in Seattle.

== Discography ==
With Lyn Hardy

- Jay & Lyn: Songs, Ballads & Fiddle Tunes (Philo, 1975)
- Catskill Mountain Goose Chase (Philo, 1977)

With Lew London

- Lew London – Swingtime In Springtime (Philo, 1976)

With Molly Mason

- Brother's Keeper (Angel Records, 1993)
- Live At Gettysburg College (Fiddle & Dance Records, 1994)
- The Lovers' Waltz (Angel Records 7243 5 55561 2 7, 1997)
- The Catskill Collection (Fiddle & Dance Records FDCD103, 1998)
- Harvest Home (Angel Records 7243 5 56720 2 5, 1999)
- A Song Of Home (An American Musical Journey) (with James Galway) (BMG, RCA Victor, RCA Victor Group, 2002)
- Relax Your Mind (with Swingology) (Angel Records, 2003)
- The Pleasures Of Winter (Fiddle & Dance Records, 2008)
- A Fiddler's Holiday (Rounder Records 11661–9153–2, 2012)
- The Quiet Room (Fiddle & Dance Records FDCD105, 2018)

With Stephen Foster, Thomas Hampson, Molly Mason, and David Alpher

- American Dreamer: Songs of Stephen Foster (Angel Records, 1992)

With Molly Mason and Anjelica Huston

- Rip Van Winkle (Rabbit Ears Productions RCE 74041-70738-2, 1992)

With The Newman & Oltman Guitar Duo, Turtle Island String Quartet, and Sally Rogers

- Laments & Dances (Music From The Folk Traditions) (Musicmasters Classics 01612-67145-2, 1994) (Musical Heritage Society 5169768, 2003)

With David Levine and Molly Mason

- Dance Of A Child's Dreams (misc.) (Angel Records, 1995)

With Howie Bursen, Molly Mason, and Bob Pasquarello

- Banjo Manikin (Folk-Legacy Records CD-130, 2001)

With Fiddle Fever

- Fiddle Fever (Flying Fish FF247, 1981)
- Waltz Of The Wind (Flying Fish FF303, 43725, FF90303, 1984)

With Putnam String County Band

- Home Grown (Rounder Records, 1973)

With Cat Mother and The All News Boys

- The Street Giveth.. And The Street Taketh Away (Polydor, 1969)
- Albion Doo-Wah... (Polydor, 1970)
- Cat Mother (Polydor, 1972)
- Cat Mother Last Chance Dance (Polydor, 1973)

With Ocean

- Ocean (The Lollipoppe Shoppe LLP006, 2020)

== Videography ==
With Fiddle Fever

- Sullivan Ballou Letter / Ashokan Farewell (Elektra Nonesuch)

With The Transatlantic House Band

- The Original Transatlantic Sessions - Transatlantic Sessions 1 (Whirlie Records, 2008)

== Compilations ==
With Stephen Foster, Thomas Hampson, Molly Mason, and David Alpher

- Ashokan Farewell - Beautiful Dreamer: Songs Of Stephen Foster (Classics For Pleasure 0946 3 82225 2 1, 2007)
- Songs; The Rose Of The Night; Eight Poems Of Emily Dickinson (w/ Charles Tomlinson Griffes, Aaron Copland, Deborah Voigt, Brian Zeger, and Barbara Hendricks) (EMI Classics, EMI Classics 2 34479 2, 50999 2 34479 2 9, 2008)

With Aly Bain and others

- The Original Transatlantic Sessions, Volume 1 (Whirlie Records WHIRLIECD15, 1, 2009)
- The Original Transatlantic Sessions, Volume 2 (Whirlie Records WHIRLIECD16, 2, 2009)
- The Original Transatlantic Sessions, Volume 3 (Whirlie Records WHIRLIECD17, 3, 2009)
