= Wheatland Music Festival =

Music and arts festival in Remus, Michigan, US

- Genre: Traditional arts and music
- Date: Weekend after Labor day
- Frequency: Annual
- Locations: Remus, Michigan, United States
- Inaugurated: 1974
- Previous event: 2025
- Next event: 2026
- Website: Wheatlandmusic.org

The Wheatland Music Festival is a music and arts festival organized by the Wheatland Music Organization, a non-profit organization specializing in the preservation and presentation of traditional arts and music. Community outreach services include programming for Senior facilities and schools across mid-Michigan, year-round instrument lessons, scholarship programs, Jamborees, Traditional Dances, and Wheatscouts - a free program educating children through music, dance, storytelling, crafts and nature. Each year, the organization holds its annual Traditional Arts Weekend the weekend of Memorial Day, and its annual festival during the second weekend in September in the unincorporated community of Remus in the state of Michigan, in the United States. The first Wheatland Music Festival was held August 24, 1974.

== History ==
In the early 1970s a small group of Mt. Pleasant Food Co-Op (now the GreenTree Cooperative Grocery) members and local musicians were staging free concerts and benefits around the Big Rapids and Mt. Pleasant, Michigan areas. Common sites were city parks and public halls. Proceeds enabled the food co-op to pay rent and utilities. Meanwhile, founders of the Wheatland Music Organization were organizing about two concerts a month during the summer.

The First Wheatland Bluegrass Festival was held as a benefit for the Mt. Pleasant Food Co-Op, August 24, 1974. It was a one-day event held on the Rhode family farm, located four miles east of Remus on M-20. June Rhodes' utility room became festival headquarters, her backyard was the backstage area, and her sister-in-law's yard across the road was the parking lot. The flatbed trailers were in place along with the first-aid tent, a sound system, and a hotdog stand.

By 1975 Wheatland was born. Elections were held and the board of directors was established. Many of the first directors are still active in the organization. This can be attributed to their faith in each other, their commitment to community service, and passion for preserving and presenting traditional music and arts.

With the 47th annual festival being deferred to 2021, officials blamed the COVID-19 pandemic as the result of 2020's cancellation.

2021 festival and lineup were announced in June 2021, however due to rising rates of COVID-19 the 2021 festival was cancelled on August 11, with the next festival deferred to September 2022.

== Timeline ==
=== 1970s ===
1974

- 1st Wheatland Music Festival (one-day event on Aug 24)

1975

- Board of Directors Established (May 13)
- Articles of Incorporation filed as "Wheatland Music Organization" (May 29)
- Festival moved to Wernette Farm

1976

- Wheatland Music Festival becomes a 2-day event
- Information tent was born: rented from the Beal City Knights of Columbus

1977

- Wheatland Bylaws are ratified/amended
- Non-Profit Status is awarded
- 1st Wheatlan Music Festival album is produced
- 1st WMO Reunion is held at Central Michigan University

1978

- 1st "Main Stage" is built

1979

- "Our Front Porch" radio show is developed
- Costabella Cloggers make 1st appearance at Wheatland Music Festival
- Public Transportation 1st used at Wheatland Music Festival

=== 1980s ===
1980

- Day-long textile arts workshops held at Wheatland in March
- 6 Albums are now on Wheatland's Record Label
- 1st Grant was received to host a Community Education Program in October

1981

- 1st WMO Newsletter is established

1982

- WMO purchases their 1st computer
- WCMU Begins taping the music festival

1983 Land purchase: WMO puts $100 down on Gunnison Property

- WMO Sponsors 1st Music Conference
- WMO Begins Old Time Country dances in Mt. Pleasant

1984

- "Our Front Porch" radio show is offered to National Public Radio
- Land Contract signed to purchase 20 acres from Mark and Gladys Wernette

1985

- Wheatland Cabin is built
- Kids Hill Playhouse is built

1986

- More work done at Kids Hill: 5 picnic tables built along with a wood-framed swing and fenced-in area for sheep

1987

- A recycling program is introduced at Wheatland
- Ice made available for sale on site for first time
- Wheatscouts program for children begins at Wheatland
- WMO monthly Jamboree begins at Wheatland

1988

- "Third Stage" Dance Pavilion is built
- WMO added "Inc." to its name
- WMO Logo Trademarked/Patented
- Teen Dance at the Festival is established

1989

- Elyce Fishman Scholarship established
- 1st Wheatland Dance Camp is held over Memorial Day Weekend (May 26–28)
- WMO collaborates with MSU to produce "Michigan In Song" Michigan performers cassettes
- WMO Presented with "Ambassador's Award" by Mecosta County Chamber of Commerce

=== 1990s ===
1990

- 140 Acres purchased from Mark and Gladys Wernette
- WMO Board develops revised mission statement, bylaws and organizational goals
- WMO Copyright registration process begins
- The Gladys Wernette Classroom Building is built

1991

- Kitchen Building is built
- Wheatland Memberships begin
- Mark and Gladys Wernette celebrate their 55th wedding anniversary

1992

- Information Building is built
- Electricity became available at all work stations and lighting is added to the campgrounds
- Orientation Workshops begin for campground volunteers
- "Peace Train" added to Kids Hill

1998

- Original "Main Stage" is moved to Kids Hill
- The structure now known as "Main Stage" is built

=== 2000s ===
2001

- The Hospitality Building known as the "Post Office" is built in honor of Mark Wernette

== Performers by year ==
=== 2020s ===
2025

- Critton Hollow String Band
- Nikki D. and the Sisters of Thunder
- The Gibson Brothers
- Catfish Keith
- Kittel & Co.
- Ladama
- La R’Voyure
- AJ Lee & Blue Summit
- Steve Poltz
- The Revelers
- Solas
- Cristina Vane
- The Wild Shoats

CENTENNIAL STAGE

- All American Funk Parade
- Crazy Chestur
- The Go Rounds
- The Johns
- The Lucky Nows
- Road Warriors: RJ Cowder, Joel Mabus & Dana Cooper
- The Rebel Eves
- Wild Honey Collective
- Community Sing

Schafer Song Stage Performers

- Andy Baker
- Caroline Barlow
- Jen Cass
- Rachel Dresselhouse
- Ed Dupas
- Steff Kayser
- Audra Kubat
- John D Lamb
- Michael Robertson
- Kait Rose
- Mark Schrock & Mary Sue Wilkinson
- Sarah Schingeck
- Alex Teller
- Mike Ward

Dance Stage Performers

- Bayou Rhythm Aces
- Blue Water Ramblers
- Dave Goodwin
- Hawks & Owls
- Becky Hill
- Palooka Brothers
- K Jones and the Benzie Playboys
- Third Coast Swing
- The Velvet Boys

Workshop Lane

- Rachael Davis
- Mike Ross
- Round Creek String Band
- Andy Wilson

Kids Hills Performers

- Amanda McCarty-Bucket Band
- Blue Water Ramblers
- Benjammin Educational Music Program
- Bruce Bauman – fiddle
- Carolyn Koebel & Samuel Nalangira
- Clear Sky Sound
- Cory Cole – Bongos
- Craig Van Otteren – Drums
- Guitar for Kids with Patrick Knotts
- Jay’s Jaw Harp Workshop
- Kevin Murphy & Ted Bergin – Harmonica
- Maciek Biezunski
- Rootbears Family Hour
- Agnes Su & The Wildflowers
- Nola Dekam – Origami
- Surcadiana
- The Jump Bunny String Band
- Susan Harrison and Palamazoo
- The Porters
- Ron Fowler
- Kyle Joe & The Real Humdingers
- Tunes and Tales by Tricia

Rhythm Stage

- Samba Batucada
- Japanese Taiko
- The Art of Pandeiro (Brazilian Tambourine)
- Afro-Cuban Drumming (Conga Conga Conga)
- Community Drum Circle (Sundance & Solair)
- East African Dance Workshop

2024

- Sierra Hull
- Shemekia Copeland
- BeauSoleil avec Michael Doucet
- KíLA
- Tony Trischka
- Chris Smither
- Mireya Ramos & The Poor Choices
- The Joy Lapps Project
- Steam Machine
- Twisted Pine
- Alexis Chartrand & Mélissandre Trembley-Bourrassa
- The Flint Southernaires
- Peter Mulvey
- Badass Women Band
- Rachael & Dominic Davis
- Samuel Nalangira
- Wilson Thicket
- The Howdy Boyz
- Silver Creek Revival
- Whorled
- Joe Hertler (solo)
- The Schrock Bros Band
- Sam Robbins
- Spencer LaJoye
- Kyle Rasche
- Jill Jack
- Sierra Cassidy
- Round Creek String Band
- K. Jones & the Benzie Playboys
- The Palooka Bros
- The Blue Water Ramblers
- Rick Thum
- Dan Hazlett
- Chris Buhalis
- Eliza Thorp
- Michael Robertson

2023

- The Sensational Barnes Brothers
- Jake Blount Band
- Sam Bush
- The BIG Family Business
- Ruthie Foster
- Nic Gareiss and Allison de Groot
- Eilen Jewell
- Jourdan Thibodeaux & Les Rodailleurs
- Le Vent Du Nord
- Lone Piñon
- Lúnasa
- The Onlies
- Tuba Skinny
- Adrian & Meredith
- Scott Cook
- Full Cord
- Gasoline Gypsies
- Gerald Ross & Frank Youngman
- Kait Rose and the Thorns
- Michael McNevin
- Planet D Nonet
- Josh Rose & the Founding Fathers
- Round Creek String Band
- Samuel Nalangira
- Claudia Schmidt
- Annie Bacon
- Andy Baker
- Caroline Barlow
- Jim Bizer
- Ralston Bowles
- Jen Cass
- Scott Cook
- Lauren Crane
- Dave Boutette & Kristi Davis
- Eric Engblade
- Michelle Held
- Audra Kubat
- Michael McNevin
- Sean Miller
- Nicholas James Thomasma

2022

- Blue Highway
- Joe Troop
- Foghorn Stringband
- Racines featuring Steve Riley & friends
- Joe Luis Walker
- Big Sandy & His Fly-Rite Boys
- Sweet Water Warblers
- Evie Ladin Band
- Keith Terry and Crosspulse
- Eileen Ivers
- Dirk Powell
- Kane and Gellert
- Northern Kentucky Brotherhood
- The Family Business
- Djangophonique
- Jill Jack Band
- Annie and Rod Capps Band
- Via Mardot
- Hawks and Owls
- Jive at Five
- Blue Water Warblers
- The Palooka Brothers

2021

- - Canceled due to COVID

2020

- - Canceled due to COVID - Online Festival streamed "Wheatland Worldwide"

=== 2010s ===
2019

- Robbie Fulks and Linda Gail Lewis
- Red Squirrel Chasers
- Freddy & Francine
- Hazmat Modine
- The Mammals
- The Jones Family Singers
- Short Round String Band
- The Quebe Sisters
- Alsadair Frasier and the New World Assembly
- Tim O'Brien Band
- De Temps Antan
- The Special Consensus
- Dead Horses
- K. Jones and The Benzie Playboys
- Escaping Pavement
- Roosevelt Diggs
- The Journeymen
- May and The Motivations
- Sally Rogers and Claudia Schmidt
- Dick Siegel
- Forest Huval

2018

- John McCutcheon
- Darrell Scott
- Thornetta Davis
- Kittel & Co.
- Town Mountain
- Charley Crockett
- Las Cafeteras
- Front Country
- Altan
- Steppin' In It
- Corn Potato String Band
- Nora Jane Struthers
- SHIFT
- Joe Hall & The Cane Cutters
- The Schrock Brothers
- Jen Sygit
- Elephant Rescue
- Diamonds In The Rust
- Rollie Tussing
- Nickolas James & The Bandwagon
- Emily Rose
- Andy Baker
- John D. Lamb
- Josh Rose
- Sam Corbin
- Jan Krist & Jim Bizer
- Annie & Rod Capps
- Anne Heaton & Frank Marotta

2017

- Michael Cleveland & Flamekeeper
- Radney Foster
- Luke Winslow-King
- Gaby Moreno
- Molsky's Mountain Drifters
- Ruthie Foster
- Jayme Stone's Folklife and Lomax Project
- La Cave Tap Reunion
- The Defibulators
- Feufollet
- Don Julin's Mr. Natural Project
- The Northern Kentucky Brotherhood Singers
- Drew Nelson and Highway 2
- The Bootstrap Boys
- T-Mart Rounders/Milnes, Chesser, & Hill
- Diff and Dudley
- The Avi Lesser Jug Band
- Planet D Nonet

2016

- Asleep at the Wheel
- Charlie Musselwhite
- The Gibson Brothers
- Solas
- Bruce Daigrepont
- Haas Kowert Tice
- Mike + Ruthy
- Footworks
- Nic Gareiss & Friends
- Three Women and the Truth (Mary Gauthier, Gretchen Peters, Eliza Gikyson)
- Adonis Puentes & The Voice of Cuba Orchestra
- The Cactus Blossoms
- Black Twig Pickers
- Luke Winslow-King
- Red Tail Ring
- Stella!
- The Go-Rounds
- Delilah DeWylde & The Lost Boys
- Mark Lavengood Bluegrass Bonanza!
- Soltre
- Ralston Bowles
- Chris Buhalis
- Ira Bernstein
- Frank Allison
- May Erlewine
- Natalie Mae
- Joe Shields
- Michelle Chenard & Pete Kehoe
- Jan Krist & Kim Bizer

2015

- Joshua Davis
- Dervish
- Rock My Soul- The McCrary Sisters & The Fairfield Four
- Foghorn Stringband
- Balsam Range
- Savoy Family
- Bill Kirchen
- California Feetwarmers
- Jerron "Blind Boy" Paxton
- Peter Mulvey
- Wild Ponies
- Samantha Martin and Delta Sugar
- Rapetipetam
- Gerald Ross
- Lindsay Lou & The Flatbellys
- Rollie Tussing & The Midwest Territory Band
- Gifts or Creatures
- The Mudpuppys

2014

- Rodney Crowell
- Pokey LaFarge
- Sarah Jarosz
- Sharon Shannon
- The Steel Wheels
- Eden Brent
- Bonsoir Catin
- Ira Bernstein
- The Asham Stompers
- Billy Strings & Don Julin
- Big Foot String Band
- Detour
- Nic Gareiss & Maeve Gilchrist
- Claudia Schmidt & Dean McGraw
- Rachael Davis
- Red Tail Ring
- Alafrique
- The Madcat Midnight Blues Journey
- The Accidentals
- Bennett
- Kavazabava
- Michigan Songwriters- Justin VanHaven, "E" Minor, Michael Crittenden, Tracy Kash

2013

- Bela Fleck & Abigail Washburn
- La Bottine Souriante
- The Reverend Peyton's Big Damn Band
- The Duhks
- Big Sandy and His Fly-Rite Boys
- Billy Strings & Don Julin
- Carry it on... Dance Project
- The Revelers
- The Boxcars
- Run Boy Run
- The Waymores
- Henrie Brothers
- Northern Kentucky Brotherhood Singers
- The Appleseed Collective
- Bennett
- Steppin’ In It
- The Palooka Brothers
- Michigan Songwriters: Rachael Davis, Kitty Donohoe, Michelle Chenard

2012

- Eric Bibb Stringband
- Hoots & Hellmouth
- Cedric Watson & Bijou
- De Temps Antan
- Ruthie Foster
- Hogwire Stringband
- Gibson Brothers
- Deke Dickerson
- Paul Thorn
- Good Foot Dance Ensemble
- Drew Nelson and Highway 2
- The Crane Wives
- Lindsay Lou & the Flatbellys
- Black Jake and The Carnies
- Planet D Nonet

2011

- The Freight Hoppers
- Abigail Washburn & the Village
- Craver, Hicks, Watson & Newberry
- Los Texmaniacs
- Peter Rowan Bluegrass Band
- Rhythmic Circus
- The Starlight Six
- Ray Bonneville
- Wayne “The Train” Hancock & Willie “Big Eyes” Smith
- An Dro
- Black Jake and The Carnies
- Blue Water Ramblers
- Jessie Nieves & Nic Gareiss: Life After Limerick
- Shades of Grey
- The Laws
- Old Foresters
- Red Sea Pedestrians
- Michigan Songwriters: J. Oscar Bittinger, Karisa Wilson, Kirby & Susan Harrison

2010

- Dave Alvin & the Guilty Women
- Joel Mabus Trio
- Big Medicine
- BeauSoleil
- Rory Block
- Laura Cortese
- Delilah DeWylde and the Lost Boys
- The Hotmud Family
- Genticorum
- Nic Gareiss & Friends
- The Paschall Brothers
- Slide Ireland
- Jeff & Vida
- The Cornfed Girls
- Ralston Bowles
- Open Range
- Davis vs. Davis
- The Red Sea Pedestrians
- Seth and May
- The Wild Turkeys
- Starlight 6
- Steppin’ In It
- Michigan Songwriters: Jill Jack, Barbara Jordan, John Latini, Josh Rose

=== 2000s ===
2009

- Crooked Still
- The SteelDrivers
- Aubrey Ghent Band
- Red Stick Ramblers
- Ruthie Foster
- Rhythm in Shoes
- Delilah DeWylde and the Lost Boys
- The Radiators
- The Deadly Gentlemen
- De Temps Antan
- The Wilders
- Ginny Hawker and Tracy Schwarz
- Sam Amidon
- Robin and Linda Williams and Their Fine Group
- Bruce Molsky and Big Hoedown
- Detour
- Drew Nelson
- Michigan Songwriters: Dave Boutette, Robin Lee Berry, Michael Camp, Dan Hazlett

2008

- Crooked Still
- David "Honeyboy" Edwards
- The Pine Leaf Boys
- The Freight Hoppers
- The Tarbox Ramblers
- The Ragbirds
- Dale Watson
- Cheryl Wheeler
- The Cherryholmes Family
- The Chicken Chokers
- Tim Graves & Cherokee
- The Refugees
- Sole Impact
- Slide
- Bichini Biz Congo Dance Theater Co.
- Michael Smith
- The Jeremy Kittell Band
- Lost World String Band
- Nic Gareiss & Friends
- Madcat, Kane, Schrock & Shimmin
- Curly Miller and Carole Anne Rose and the Old 78's
- The Rhythm Billies
- Michigan Songwriters: Jen Cass, Jen Sygit, John Lamb, Michael Camp

2007

- Eric Bibb
- Uncle Earl
- Aubrey Ghent
- The Duhks
- The Gimbles
- GiveWay
- The Lost Bayou Ramblers
- Orpheus Supertones
- Seth Bernard & Daisy May Erlewine
- Mountain Heart
- Earthworks Music
- The Tarbox Ramblers
- Rusty Blaides
- Rhythm in Shoes
- Tom Russell
- Like Water Drum & Dance
- Detour
- The Great Lakes Ceili Band
- The Milroys
- The Schrock Brothers
- Floyd King and the Bushwhackers
- Michigan Songwriters: Drew Nelson, Ralston Bowles, Jen Sygit, Jen Cass

2006

- Seth Bernard and Daisy May
- Ira Bernstein and Riley Baugus
- The Biddies
- Calvin Cooke
- Detour
- The Duhks
- Foghorn Stringband
- Freshwater
- Grada
- Green Grass Cloggers
- Whit Hill and The Postcards
- Hurry The Jug
- Jay and Molly and Their Family Band
- Jive At Five
- Randy Kohrs and The Lites
- Lafayette Rhythm Devils
- Los Bandits
- Pat Madden
- Mamadou Diabate Ensemble
- Michigan Songwriters in the Round
- Mountain Town Moonshiners
- Tim O'Brien
- Sally Potter
- The Ragbirds
- Rootstand

2005

- Charivari
- Hillbilly Idol
- Robert Jones
- King Wilkie
- Laurie Lewis
- Maria Muldaur and Her Red Hot Bluesiana Band
- Pierce Pettis
- Red Stick Ramblers
- Rhythm In Shoes
- The Rockinghams
- Steppin' In It
- Le Vent du Nord
- The Wilders

2004

- Campbell Brothers
- Footworks
- Whit Hill and The Postcards
- King Wilkie
- Louisiana Red
- The Mammals
- Mollie O'Brien and Jive At Five
- Steve Riley and the Mamou Playboys
- Darrell Scott
- Solas
- Dale Watson and His Lone Stars
- The Wilders
- Robin and Linda Williams and their Fine Group

2003

- Big Sandy and His Fly-Rite Boys
- Charivari
- The Dixie Hummingbirds
- Donna the Buffalo
- Door Nails
- Grasshoppah
- Josh Graves and Kenny Baker
- Jive At Five
- The Mammals
- Tim O'Brien
- Ramble Shoe
- Red Clay Ramblers
- Rhythm In Shoes
- Saffire - The Uppity Blues Women
- Dick Siegel
- Chris Smither
- Rodney Sutton
- Blake Travis
- Vishten

2002

- Aztec
- Eric Bibb
- Norman and Nancy Blake
- Clayfoot Strutters
- Geno Delafose
- Rachael Davis
- Johnny Gimble and the Hot Club of Cowtown
- Buddy and Julie Miller
- Millish
- Melvin Mosley and The Spirit of Memphis
- Mountain Heart
- Rhythm In Shoes
- April Verch

2001

- Balfa Toujours
- Barachois
- Big Sandy and His Fly-Rite Boys
- Blue Highway
- Calvin Cooke Sacred Steel Ensemble
- Chief O'Neill's House Band
- Guy Clark
- Stacey Earle
- Footworks
- John Hammond, Jr.
- Ill-Mo Boys
- Tom, Brad, and Alice
- The Whites

2000

- Howard Armstrong Trio
- Lee Benoit and the Bayou Stompers
- Ira Bernstein and Company
- Blue Highway
- Blues Swingers
- Guy Davis
- Fat City String Band
- Hillbilly Idol
- Lynn Morris Band
- Tim O'Brien and The Crossing
- Los Pleneros de la 21
- Claudia Schmidt
- Tongue and Groove
- Volo Bogtrotters

=== 1990s ===
1999

- Los Bandits
- Barton and Sweeney
- Blues Swingers
- Lee Benoit and the Bayou Stompers
- Cephas and Wiggins
- Guy Clark
- The Dixie Hummingbirds
- Footworks
- Freight Hoppers
- Hillbilly Idol
- Improbabillies
- Patty Larkin
- Claire Lynch

1998

- Ira Bernstein
- Ralph Blizard and the New Southern Ramblers
- Continental Divide
- Critton Hollow String Band
- De Dannan
- The Dixie Hummingbirds
- Iowa Rose
- Jive At Five
- Joel Mabus
- Tim and Mollie O'Brien with Jerry Douglas
- Steve Riley and the Mamou Playboys
- Rhythm In Shoes
- Sally Rogers
- Saffire - The Uppity Blues Women
- Samite
- Robin and Linda Williams and their Fine Group

1997

- Bone Tones
- Continental Divide
- Ramblin' Jack Elliott
- Footworks
- Freight Hoppers
- Johnny Gimble
- Jive At Five
- Los Bandits
- Larry Penn
- Rhythm Rats
- Paul Rishell and Anne Raines
- Schryer Triplets
- Solas
- Rosalie Sorrels
- Gillian Welch and David Rawlings

1996

- Mac Benford and His Woodshed Allstars
- Benoit Bourque and Gaston Bernard
- Ira Bernstein
- Bing Brothers
- Burns Sisters
- Johnny Gimble and Texas Swing
- Laurie Lewis and Grant Street
- Raisin Pickers and Crows Feet
- Red Mules
- Rhythm In Shoes
- Peter Rowan and Jerry Douglas
- Saffire - The Uppity Blues Women
- Dick Siegel
- Pop Wagner and Glenn Ohrlin

1995

- Amaryllis
- Critton Hollow String Band
- Del McCoury Band
- Footworks
- Jive At Five
- Si Kahn
- Los Bandits
- Kate MacKenzie
- Tim and Mollie O'Brien and the O'Boys
- Open House
- Raisin Pickers
- Renegades
- Steve Riley and the Mamou Playboys
- Saffire - The Uppity Blues Women
- Samite
- Second Opinion

1994

- Kitty Donohoe
- Gospel Warriors
- Indian Creek Delta Boys
- Jive At Five
- John Hartford
- Kapelye
- Lonesome River Band
- Poodles
- Rhythm In Shoes
- Steve Riley and the Mamou Playboys
- Jody Stecher and Kate Brislin
- Thundering Cannonballs
- Claude "Fiddler" Williams

1993

- Ira Bernstein
- Bone Tones
- Critton Hollow String Band
- Dry Branch Fire Squad
- Feltliners
- Fiddle Puppets with Rodney Sutton
- Heartbeats
- Lonesome River Band
- Joel Mabus
- Peter Ostroushko and Dean Magraw
- Utah Phillips
- Red Mule String Band
- Peter Madcat Ruth and Shari Kane
- Reunited Gospel Echoes
- Sally Rogers and Claudia Schmidt
- Trian
- Volo Bogtrotters
- Robin and Linda Williams with Jim Watson and Kevin Maul

1992

- Ira Bernstein
- Bone Tones
- Bryan Bowers
- Cephas and Wiggins
- Cathy Fink and Marcy Marxer
- Ginny Hawker and Kay Justice
- Hoosier Humdingers
- Tim and Mollie O'Brien
- Tim O'Brien and the O'Boys
- Old time Missouri Fiddlers and Dancers
- Pashami Dancers
- Porkypines
- Red Mule String Band

1991

- Howard Armstrong and Ray Kamalay
- Mac Benford and His Woodshed Allstars
- Bone Tones
- Cobb Brothers
- Drummers and Dancers
- Fiddle Puppets
- Holmes Brothers
- Alison Krauss and Union Station
- Lost World String Band
- Tim and Mollie O'Brien
- Old Time Missouri Fiddlers
- Robin Petrie and Danny Carnahan
- Ranch Romance
- Saginaw Ojibwe Singers
- Dick Siegel

1990

- Birmingham Sunlights
- Ralph Blizard and The New Southern Ramblers
- Kevin Burke, James Kelly, and Gerry O'Beirne
- Critton Hollow String Band
- Drummers and Dancers
- Henrie Brothers
- David Holt
- Santiago Jimenez, Jr.
- Laurie Lewis and Grant Street
- North Carolina Blues Revue
- Maura O'Connell
- Rhythm In Shoes
- Saginaw Ojibwe Singers
- Dick Siegel
- Song Sisters
- Volo Bogtrotters

=== 1980s ===
1989

- Ira Bernstein
- Ralph Blizard and The New Southern Ramblers
- Delton Broussard and The Lawtell Playboys
- Cephas and Wiggins
- Fiddle Puppets
- Henrie Brothers
- Johnny Gimble
- Howard Levy
- Laurie Lewis and Grant Street
- Joel Mabus
- Memphis Beck and the Red Hots
- Millie Ortego
- Song Sisters
- Sukay
- Wildcats
- Robin and Linda Williams

1988

- Ralph Blizard and The New Southern Ramblers
- Greg Brown
- Chicken Chokers
- Les Danseurs de la Rivière-Rouge
- Fiddle Puppets
- Johnny Gimble
- David Holt
- Heartbeats
- Iowa Rose
- Laketown Buskers
- Nashville Bluegrass Band
- LaVaughn Robinson
- Odetta
- Terrance Simien and The Mallet Playboys
- Song Sisters
- The Tannahill Weavers
- Dick Tarrier
- Volo Bogtrotters

1987

- Chicken Chokers
- Lotus Dickey and Bob Lucas
- Kitty Donohoe
- Fairfield Four
- Fiddle Puppets
- Folktellers
- Green Grass Cloggers
- The Horse Flies
- Denny Jones, Paul Kovac, and Clear Fork
- Kentucky Warblers
- Red Clay Ramblers
- Peter Madcat Ruth
- Johnny Shines, Peter Ostroushko and the Mando Boys
- Volo Bogtrotters

1986

- Ira Bernstein
- Ken Bloom
- Bob Brozman and Brownie McGhee
- The Dixie Hummingbirds
- Lost World String Band
- Reel World String Band
- Riders In The Sky
- Peter Madcat Ruth
- Savoy-Doucet
- Howard "Sandman" Sims
- Skylark
- Rosalie Sorrels
- Pete Sutherland
- Dick Tarrier
- Uncles and the Footnotes
- Robin and Linda Williams

1985

- O.J. Anderson
- Dewey Balfa
- Ira Bernstein
- Costabella Cloggers
- Critton Hollow String Band
- Percy Danforth
- Sheila Dailey
- The Dixie Hummingbirds
- Doug dillard Band
- Eclectricity
- Fiddle Puppets
- Cathy Fink
- Friends of Fiddlers Green
- The Horse Flies
- Hot Rize
- Iowa Ros
- Ray Kamalay
- Joel Mabus
- Malone, Carroll, Keane and O'Connell
- Red Knuckles and the Trailblazers
- Rugcutters
- Dick Tarrier

1984

- O.J. Anderson
- Beausoleil
- Ken Bloom
- Canebrake Rattlers
- Costabella Cloggers
- Double Decker String Band
- Dave and Kay Gordon
- Hot Rize
- Iowa Rose and Riff Raff
- Ira Bernstein
- Si Kahn
- Kinvara
- Red Clay Ramblers
- Red Hot Peppers
- Claudia Schmidt
- Shuffle Creek Dancers
- Sweet Honey in the Rock
- Dick Tarrier
- Trapezoid

1983

- Beausoleil
- Sandy Bradley and The Small Wonder String Band
- Major Contay and the Canebrake Rattlers
- Costabella Cloggers
- Jean Denny
- Robert Dodson
- Double Decker String Band
- Fiddle Puppets
- Foot Loose
- Day and Kay Gordon
- Henrie Brothers
- Hot Mud Family
- Lost World String Band
- Joel Mabus
- Na Cabar Feidh
- Reel Union
- Sally Rogers
- Claudia Schmidt
- Mike Seeger
- Dick Tarrier

1982

- Blue Velvet
- Boreal String Band
- Dan Brandon, Rex and Letha Raymond
- Bryan Bowers
- Costabella Cloggers
- De Dannan
- Fiddle Puppets
- Hotfoot Quintet
- Hot Mud Family
- Lost World String Band
- Mulligan Dancers
- New Pairie Ramblers
- Northland College Voyageurs
- Utah Phillips
- Riders In The Sky
- Sally Rogers
- Dick Tarrier
- Will White and Paul Gifford
- Robin and Linda Williams

1981

- Bosom Buddies
- Wilma Lee Cooper and the Clinch Mountain Clan
- Dance All Night
- De Dannan
- Rick and Maureen Del Grosso
- Fiction Brothers
- Fiddle Puppets
- Henrie Brothers
- Hot Mud Family
- Ken Bloom
- Mulligan Dancers
- Na Cabar Feidh
- Percy Danforth
- Red Clay Ramblers
- Sally Rogers
- Dick Tarrier
- John Turner and the Fiddletree Band
- Whetstone Run
- Williams Family

1980

- Backwoods String Band
- Tony Barrand
- Costabella Cloggers
- Hazel Dickins
- Fiction Brothers
- Fiddle Puppets
- Henrie Brothers
- Si Kahn
- Lost World String Band
- Michael, McCreesh, and Campbell
- Quackgrass
- Reel World String Band
- Jim Ringer and Mary Caslin
- Roustabouts
- Sweet Corn
- John Turner
- Whetstone Run
- Robin and Linda Williams

=== 1970's ===
1979

- Backwoods String Band
- Costabella Cloggers
- Patrick Couton
- Dekalb
- Dutch Cove String Band
- Green Grass Cloggers
- Gypsy Gypo String Band
- Henrie Brothers
- Hot Mud Family
- Lost World String Band
- Joel Mabus
- Port City Bluegrass Boys
- Quackgrass
- Red Clay Ramblers
- Reel World String Band
- Jean Ritchie
- Roustabout String Band
- Tracy and Eloise Schwarz
- Mike Seeger and Alice Gerrard
- Sinclair Bros.
- Carl Story
- Williams Family with Jay Round

1978

- Patrick Couton
- Kitty Donohoe
- Fall City Ramblers
- Flat Pickers Local No. 169
- Green Grass Cloggers
- Highwoods String Band
- Hot Mud Family
- Lost World String Band
- Joel Mabus
- Wade Mainer
- Martin, Bogan and Armstrong
- New Pine River Valley Boys
- Quackgrass
- Quality Quinn
- Red Clay Ramblers
- Sinclair Bros.
- Swamp Cats
- Jay Ungar and Lynn Hardy
- Vice Versa
- Williams Family

1977

- Bluegrass Extension Service
- Bluegrass Reunion
- Cabbage Crik
- Alice Gerrard
- Hot Mud Family
- McLain Family Band
- Red Clay Ramblers
- Jean Ritchie
- Mike Seeger
- Sounds of the South
- Williams Family

1976

- Cabbage Crik
- Easy Pickins
- Highwoods String Band
- Pine River Valley Boys
- Mike Seeger
- Stillhouse String Band
- Sweet Corn
- Williams Family

1975

- GLA Grass
- Kathy Ann and the Sounds of the South
- Kentucky Grass
- Pine River Valley Boys
- RFD Boys
- Stillhouse String Band
- Don Stover and the White Oak Mountain Boys
- Sunset Express
- Williams Family

1974

- Bean Town Valley Ramblers
- Easy Pickins
- Kentucky Grass
- Roy McGinnis and the Sunnysiders
- Pine River Valley Boys
- Tennessee Valley Boys
