= List of Rounder Records artists =

List of artists signed to Rounder Records

As of September 2019, the following artists were signed to Rounder Records.

- Abigail Washburn
- Alan Lomax Collection
- Alison Krauss
- Alison Krauss & Robert Plant
- Alison Krauss & The Cox Family
- Alison Krauss & Union Station
- Allen Toussaint
- Trace Adkins
- Bear's Den
- Béla Fleck
- Bill Morrissey
- Billy Strings
- Blackberry Smoke
- Blue Highway
- Bobby Osborne
- Bobby Rush
- Bruce Cockburn
- Bryan Sutton (Sugar Hill)
- Carlene Carter
- Caroline Spence
- Chris Hillman
- Cody Jinks
- Dailey & Vincent
- Dan Tyminski
- Darin and Brooke Aldridge
- David Bromberg
- David Davis and the Warrior River Boys
- Della Mae
- Delta Spirit
- Dawes
- Doc Watson
- Doug Seegers
- Doyle Lawson and Quicksilver
- The Earls of Leicester
- George Thorogood
- Gibson Brothers
- Gregg Allman
- Honeyhoney
- I'm with Her
- Indigo Girls
- Irma Thomas
- J.D. Crowe and the New South
- James Booker
- James King
- JD McPherson
- Jelly Roll Morton
- Jerry Douglas
- Jillette Johnson
- Katie Pruitt
- Kathleen Edwards
- Leon Redbone
- Linda Thompson
- Liz Longley (Sugar Hill)
- Logan Ledger
- Lonely Heartstring Band
- Madeleine Peyroux
- The McCrary Sisters
- Michael Cleveland and Flamekeeper
- Mikaela Davis
- Nanci Griffith
- Noam Pikelny
- Norman Blake
- O'Connor Band
- Pete Rowan and Tony Rice
- Po' Ramblin' Boys
- Pokey LaFarge
- Pony Brandshaw
- Professor Longhair
- Brad Paisley
- Raffi
- Jimmy Buffett
- Rhonda Vincent
- Riders in the Sky
- Rush
- Ruston Kelly
- Sam Bush
- Samantha Fish
- Sarah Jarosz
- Sean McConnell
- Shelby Lynne
- Sierra Ferrell
- Sierra Hull
- Son Volt
- Sondre Lerche
- Steep Canyon Rangers
- Steve Martin
- Steve Martin and Edie Brickell
- Susto
- Sweet Honey in the Rock
- The Offspring
- The Seldom Scene
- The SteelDrivers
- The Time Jumpers
- The Tragically Hip
- The War and Treaty
- Tim McGraw
- Old Dominion
- Midland
- Gary Allan
- They Might Be Giants
- Mark Wills
- Luke Bryan
- Chris Stapleton
- Chuck Wicks
- Tony Rice
- Tony Trischka
- Woody Guthrie
- Kotoko

== Artists formerly on Rounder Records ==
The following is an incomplete list of artists who have released records on Rounder.

- Darol Anger
- Etta Baker
- The Balfa Brothers
- Marcia Ball
- Russ Barenberg
- Pierre Bensusan
- Big Shoulders
- Tony Bird
- Rory Block
- Blue Rodeo
- The Blue Sky Boys
- The Bobs
- BoDeans
- Roy Book Binder
- Sandra Boynton
- Brave Combo
- Bob Brozman
- Clarence "Gatemouth" Brown
- Buckwheat Zydeco
- Solomon Burke
- JJ Cale
- Chuck Carbo
- Carter Family (Victor reissues)
- Cephas & Wiggins
- Marshall Chapman
- Vassar Clements
- Bruce Cockburn
- The Cottars
- Cowboy Junkies
- The Damnwells
- Delta Spirit
- Dennis DeYoung
- Hazel Dickens
- Disappear Fear
- Dirty Dozen Brass Band
- Michael Doucet
- Dry Branch Fire Squad
- Ronnie Earl
- John Fahey
- Cathy Fink
- Benton Flippen
- The Freight Hoppers
- Jeffrey Frederick and the Clamtones
- J. Geils
- Jimmie Dale Gilmore
- Girl Authority
- Philip Glass
- Mike Gordon
- Bill Grant and Delia Bell
- The Grascals
- David Grier
- David Grisman
- John Hartford
- Cheb Hasni
- Juliana Hatfield
- Tish Hinojosa
- The Holy Modal Rounders
- Michael Hurley
- Do'a - Randy Armstrong & Ken LaRoche
- Mississippi John Hurt
- The Incredible Casuals
- Jack Ingram
- Cody Jinks
- Tutu Jones
- Johnson Mountain Boys
- Bill Keith
- The Kids of Widney High
- Bnois King
- King Wilkie
- Shel Silverstein
- Sleepy LaBeef
- David Laibman
- Lead Belly
- John Lee
- The LeRoi Brothers
- John Linnell
- Lisa Loeb
- Magic Dick
- David Mallett
- Mike Marshall
- Del McCoury
- John McCutcheon
- Natalie MacMaster
- John Mellencamp
- The Meters
- Whistlin' Alex Moore
- Lynn Morris
- Nashville Bluegrass Band
- Tracy Nelson
- Carrie Newcomer
- NRBQ
- Alecia Nugent
- Laura Nyro
- Danny Paisley and the Southern Grass
- Ellis Paul
- Tom Paxton
- Carl Perkins
- Grant-Lee Phillips
- Pianosaurus
- Robert Plant
- Preacher Jack
- Brad Paisley
- Raffi
- Ed Reavy
- Wyatt Rice
- Jonathan Richman
- Riders in the Sky
- Butch Robins
- Jimmie Rodgers (Victor reissues)
- Johnny Sansone
- Mike Seeger
- Peggy Seeger
- Amanda Shaw
- Allen Shelton
- Jon Sholle
- Junior Sisk
- Ricky Skaggs
- Smokin' Joe Kubek
- Jo-El Sonnier
- The Soul Rebels
- SteveSongs
- Don Stover
- Billy Strings
- Tut Taylor
- Ten Shekel Shirt
- Vienna Teng
- They Might Be Giants
- Happy & Artie Traum
- Dan Tyminski
- Uncle Earl
- Joe Val
- Guy Van Duser
- Loudon Wainwright III
- Martha Wainwright
- Doc Watson
- Ween
- Cheryl Wheeler
- The Wild Magnolias
- Bob Wills
- String County Band
- Jay Ungar & Molly Mason
