= Wishing Chair =

American folk-roots music duo

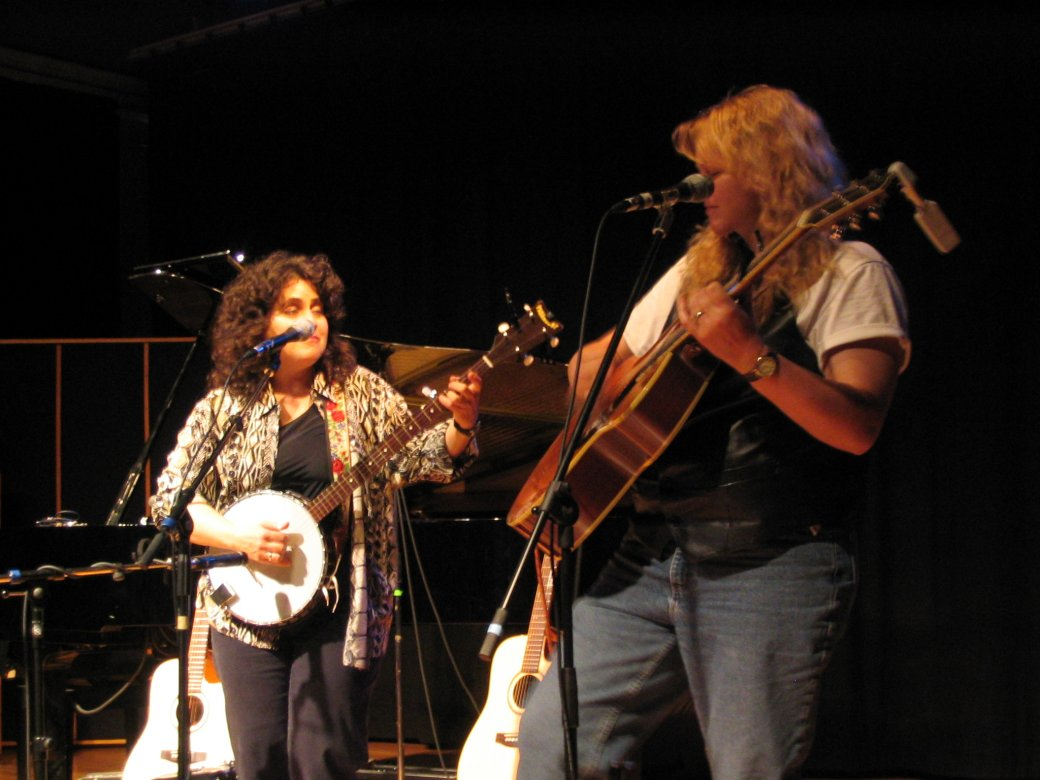
- Wishing Chair at the Western Front; Vancouver, BC; May 7, 2005

Background information
- Origin: Lexington, Kentucky, United States
- Genres: Folk rock, Roots rock
- Years active: 1995-2013
- Label: Terrakin Records
- Members: Kiya Heartwood, Miriam Davidson

Wishing Chair is an American folk-roots duo, consisting of songwriter Kiya Heartwood and multi-instrumentalist Miriam Davidson. The band formed in 1995 and has since then released eight recordings on their own independent label, Terrakin Records. They are best known for their creative musical arrangements, dynamic stage presence, and Heartwood's thoughtful lyrics.

== Biography ==
Heartwood began her professional music career in a Lexington, Kentucky band called Radio Café with drummer Kopana Terry. The band later changed its name to Stealin Horses and was signed by the Arista label. The self-titled recording received some national acclaim. After the label dropped the band, they released one recording for Malaco/Waldoxy Records (Mesas and Mandolins) and then dissolved. Heartwood went on to record a solo album (True Frontiers) after the breakup of Stealin Horses. Heartwood did not earn money for this album, motivating her to start her own label Terrakin Records, which published Wishing Well albums.

Davidson is a native of Long Island, comes from a musical family and has been playing a variety of instruments for most of her life. Her father is a Jewish cantor and composer, and her mother was a music teacher. Before joining Heartwood and forming Wishing Chair, she performed with Bev Futrell and Karen Jones of the Reel World String Band in a trio known as Tall, Dark and Handsome.

== The band ==
Heartwood and Davidson met at a summer music program in Toronto, where Miriam was the program director and Kiya was on faculty. After performing together at a faculty recital, Heartwood invited Davidson to perform on her next solo album. By the end of the recording process, the two decided to form a band together, and Singing with the Red Wolves was released under the band name Wishing Chair.

In 2001, they met trad-folk musician Kara Barnard while performing at the National Women's Music Festival in Muncie, Indiana. They performed a few sets together, and due to the enthusiastic reaction of the audience, they decided to record an album. Dishpan Brigade was released two years later. They coined the term folk 'n' roll to describe their musical style. In 2006, their CD Underdog won Best New Folk album from Just Plain Folks, and was reviewed in Dirty Linen Magazine as "a lively batch of original songs that follow onto two of the oldest traditions of folk music: storytelling and political broadside."

In 2012, Davidson became the director of the Anna Crusis Women's Choir in Philadelphia, and Heartwood was touring solo at this time. Heartwood lives in Austin, TX.

== Discography ==
- Singing with the Red Wolves (1995)
- Undisputed Country (1998)
- Ghost of Will Harbut (2000)
- Crow (2002)
- Dishpan Brigade (2003, with Kara Barnard)
- Underdog (2005)
- Folk and Roll: Live in Austin (2007)
- Stand Up 8 (2009)

== Awards and honors ==
- Emerging Artist Finalist, Falcon Ridge Folk Festival, 2002
- Best Overall Song & Best Mellow Song Winner, South Florida Folk Festival, 2003
- Best Recording Duo/Band and Best Songwriter Winner, Outmusic, 2003
- Best New Folk CD Winner for Underdog, Just Plain Folks, 2006
- Best Roots Song Winner for "Sue Mundy," Just Plain Folks, 2006
- Jane Schliessman Award for Outstanding Contributions to Women's Music, 2008
