= Samit =

Samit could refer to one of the following:

- Sámi peoples
- Samit Basu Indian novelist
- Samit Bhanja Indian actor
- Samit Hota Indian CyberSecurity Expert

== See also ==
- Samite (disambiguation)
