= Arm-of-the-Sea Theater =

Theater troupe active since the 1980s

- Industry: Theatre
- Founded: 1982; 44 years ago
- Founder: Marlena Marallo, Patrick Wadden
- Headquarters: Saugerties, New York, United States
- Website: armofthesea.org

Arm-of-the-Sea Theater is a puppet theatre company based in Saugerties, New York. They draw their name from the Hudson River Estuary, the tidal ecosystem that reaches up from the Atlantic Ocean into New York State, upon which they are located. Their performances focus on local mythology, history, and ecology, and stress the interconnected nature of humanity and the rest of the natural world. Their style features colorful large-scale puppetry and live music.

== History ==
The troupe got its beginning at the 1982 Clearwater Pumpkin Festival, a fall festival in the Hudson Valley organized by the environmental advocacy group founded by Pete and Toshi Seeger. The inaugural cast, alongside founders Patrick Wadden and Marlena Marallo, was the volunteer crew of the Sloop Clearwater, performing at various stops as they sailed up the river that year. Although they are no longer an offshoot, the troupe has stayed affiliated with the Clearwater organization and continues to perform each year as part of Clearwater's annual summer festival, the Great Hudson River Revival, throughout the years to the present day.

For much of the group's history they have functioned primarily as a traveling theater troupe, performing at schools, children's museums, and parks from New York City to Wisconsin. They perform between 50 and 100 times a year.

In 2001, the troupe began a tradition of performing a yearly summer show, the Esopus Creek Puppet Suite, at Tina Chorvas Park, a small waterfront park alongside the Esopus in Saugerties. This eventually led the group to evolve to a more sedentary performance schedule. Although they still travel throughout the summer performance season, their main focus has shifted to developing a more grounded, local practice in Saugerties. In 2020, Wadden and Marallo bought a piece of property alongside the creek, the ruins of an old paper mill, where they began developing a permanent performance and education space, which they call the Tidewater Center. The property, which used to be the location of the Sheffield Paper Mill, was purchased by the Clearwater organization in the year 2000. They hoped to use it as a winter docking area for the Sloop before realizing that that water in the Esopus there was too shallow. Because of that, Wadden and Marallo were able to purchase the land, and in the summer of 2021 began performing there nearly full time. The Tidewater Center, as it is planned, is still incomplete.

== Artistry and Mission ==
Arm-of-the-Sea Theater's style involves both large- and small-scale puppets, mostly made of recycled and repurposed materials such as paper-mache, cardboard, and hand dyed cloth. This low-tech practice is characterized by the artists as an antidote to consumer culture and the electronic age. Despite this commitment, the show does have an electronic component, with one performer acting as the musician and narrator often using looping petals and playing multiple physical and electronic instruments live to create the effect of a larger band. Most shows have only one speaking performer, who narrates the actions of the miming puppet performers, and voices the characters played by other performers in masks or working as puppeteers. This goes back to the troupe's roots, where much of the meaning of the performance was conveyed through broad gesture and symbolic action.

The troupe combines mythological and elemental imagery, alongside scientific and historic fact, in order to better convey complicated and difficult concepts to an audience of all ages. Their mission is to bring together arts, ecology, history, and social action, in the accessible and often participatory medium of puppet theater, in order to foster understanding about humanity's place in the world.

== Works ==
=== Full list of productions ===
Below is a full list of their productions since their troupe's inception, in chronological order by year of each play's first performance. Shows with asterisks have been recorded and are available to watch online.

- The Fight Against the End of the World (1982)
- Scenes from the Invisible World (1983)
- Estuary Tales (1984)
- Give Us This Day (1985-1986)
- Somos El Barco (1986)
- A Silver Swarming (1987)
- Force of Habit (1988-1990)
- The Great Tablecloth (1989)
- Secret Lives of the Estuary (1990)
- The Water Tree (1992-2000)*
- Feast of Life (1992)
- Dreambones & Lightning (1993-1996)*
- Pulling the Plug (1995-1999)
- Seed Story (1996-2000)*
- Parable of the Great Fish (1997-2002)
- Color's Journey (1998)
- City that Drinks the Mountain Sky (1999-2018)
- Rip Van Winkle on the River of Time (1999-2001)
- The Plundered Temple (2000)
- 2001 Esopus Creek Puppet Suite: Saugerties on Hudson (2001)
- 2002 Esopus Creek Puppet Suite: Pipelinistan (2002)
- At the Turning of the Tide (2002-2009)
- 2003 Esopus Creek Puppet Suite Segment: To Defy the Beast (2003-2006)*
- From Hodu to Cush, A Purim Spiel (with Zoe B. Zak) (2004-2005)
- 2004 Esopus Creek Puppet Suite: When in the Course of Human Events (2004)
- The Panama Suitcase Show (2004-2026)
- 2005 Esopus Creek Puppet Suite: A Tale of Two Tribes (2005-2006)
- La Cosecha/The Harvest (2005-2018)
- Turtle Island Medicine Show (2006-2012)
- 2007 Esopus Creek Puppet Suite: The Illuminated Life of Rip Van Winkle
- Into the Light (with the Vanaver Caravan) (2008-2025)*
- Mutual Strangers: Henry Hudson & the River That Discovered Him (2009-2010)*
- 2010 Esopus Creek Puppet Suite: To Fuel the Fire (2010-2012)
- Criss-Crossing Borders/Cruzando Fronteras (2011-2012)*
- 2012 Esopus Creek Puppet Suite: Under Mill Wheels (2012)
- The Rejuvenary River Circus (2012-2018)
- 2013 Esopus Creek Puppet Suite: A Bend in the Crick of Time (2013)
- 2014 Esopus Creek Puppet Suite: To Rise Again (2013)
- Hook, Line & Sinker (2015-2016)
- Dirt: The Secret Life of Soil (2017-2026)*
- 2018 Esopus Creek Puppet Suite: Into the Ruins (2018)
- City that Drinks the Mountain Sky: Part Two (2018-2026)
- 2019 Esopus Creek Puppet Suite: Keep that Lamp Trimmed 'N Burning (2019)
- 2021 Esopus Creek Puppet Suite: Floodplain Rhapsodies and Taproot Remedies
- One Blue Sky (2022)*
- Riparian Rhapsody (2023- 2026)
- Estuary Tales of Wonder and Woe (2023-2026)
- Rags to Riches to Ruin (2025)
