= Barbara Armstrong =

Barbara Armstrong may refer to:

- Barbara Nachtrieb Armstrong (1890–1976), American lawyer and law professor
- Barbara Ward Armstrong (1940–2013), American artist
