= Tennessee Chocolate Drops =

- Also known as: Martin, Bogan, and Armstrong; Tennessee Trio
- Genres: Old-time, blues
- Years active: 1930–1941; 1970–1979
- Labels: Vocalion, Flying Fish Records
- Past members: Howard Armstrong; Roland Armstrong; Carl Martin; Ted Bogan

The Tennessee Chocolate Drops were an African-American string band trio, that started recording in 1930 during the Knoxville sessions. The trio consisted of brothers from Dayton, Tennessee, Howard Armstrong (fiddle) and Roland Armstrong (guitar), as well as Carl Martin (bass) of Big Stone Gap, Virginia.

== Early beginnings ==
The trio first began playing music on street corners in Knoxville, Tennessee. Eugene Ballinger convinced them to audition for the Brunswick-Vocalion recording sessions in Knoxville. They recorded two pieces on April 3, 1930, "Knox County Stomp", and "Vine Street Rag". Howard Armstrong claimed that "Vine Street Rag" began as "The Bully of the Town", but the piece eventually turned into a rag that highlighted Carl Martin's bass playing. It got the name because they often played music on Vine Street in Knoxville. The two pieces were released on the Vocalion label: once on their "old-time series", where the group was called the 'Tennessee Trio', and once on their "race" records series under the name, 'Tennessee Chocolate Drops'.

== Martin, Bogan, and Armstrong ==
Howard Armstrong and Carl Martin went on to perform with mandolin player, Ted Bogan, whom Armstrong had started playing music with near the beginning of the Great Depression. Their trio took the name 'Martin, Bogan, and Armstrong'. They spent around ten years performing in Chicago, Illinois, where they made their most notable appearance, at the 1933 World's Fair. They split after the United States entered the Second World War. In the early 1970s, Martin, Bogan, and Armstrong reunited and made two records for the Flying Fish label. Carl Martin died in 1979, but Armstrong and Bogan kept performing as a duet. They made another appearance at the World's Fair in Knoxville, in 1982.

Howard Armstrong released his debut solo album, Louis Bluie, in 1995 for the Blue Suit label. He also had two documentaries about his life, one released in 1985, Louis Bluie, and Sweet Old Song, released in 2002. He died at the age of 94 in 2003.

== Legacy ==
The Tennessee Chocolate Drops lived on through the Carolina Chocolate Drops, who started after Dom Flemons, Rhiannon Giddens, and Justin Robinson met and formed a band at a black banjo gathering in Boone, North Carolina, in 2005. The name of their group was directly inspired by the Tennessee Chocolate Drops.
