= Ted Bogan =

American country blues guitarist, singer and songwriter (1909–1990)

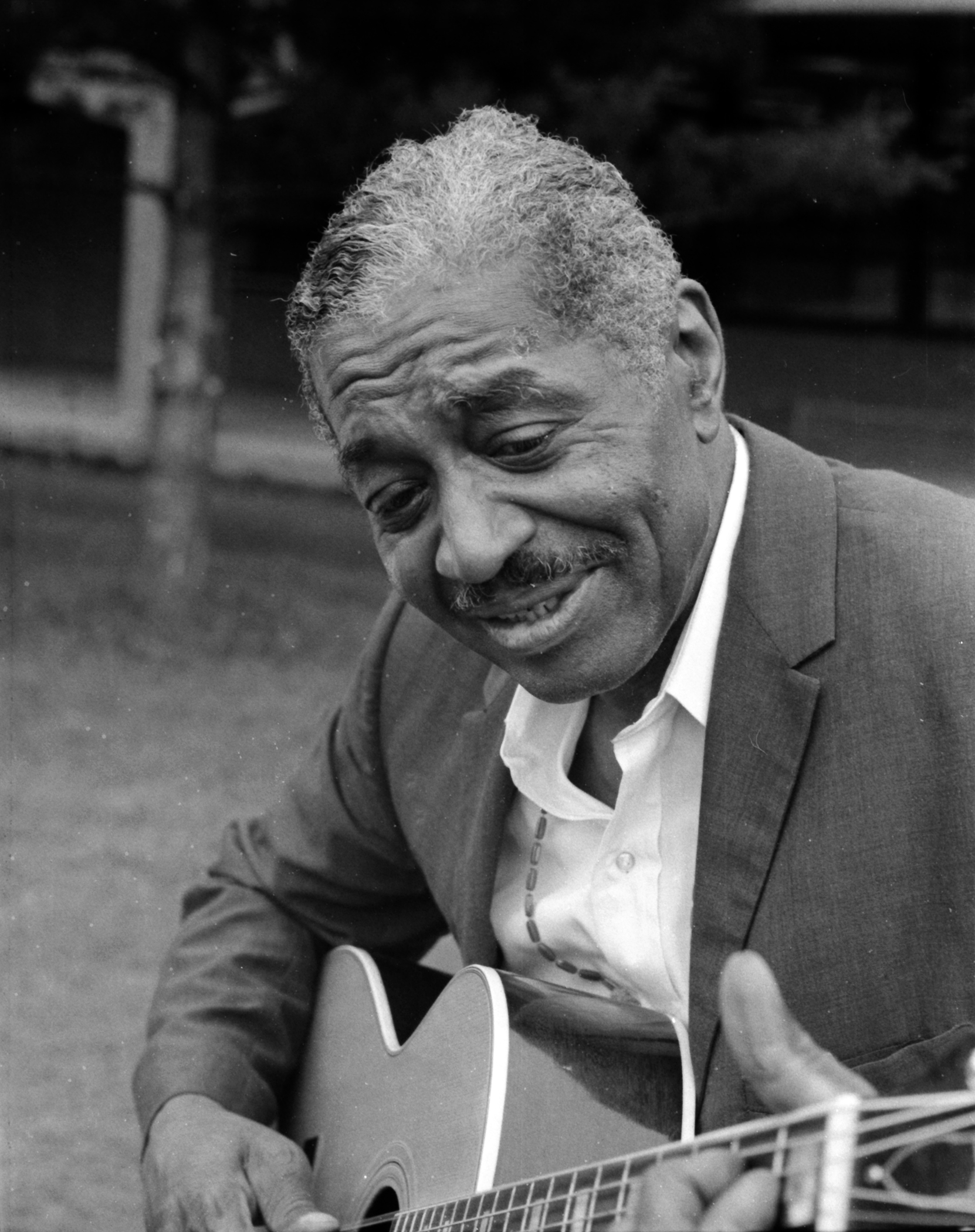
- Ted Bogan; Medford, Massachusetts, 1973.

Background information
- Born: Theodore R. Bogan; May 10, 1909; Spartanburg, South Carolina, United States
- Died: January 29, 1990 (aged 80) Detroit, Michigan, United States
- Genres: Country blues
- Occupations: Guitarist, singer, songwriter
- Instruments: Vocals, guitar
- Years active: 1930s–1990
- Labels: Bluebird, Flying Fish, Arhoolie
- Formerly of: The Four Keys; the Tennessee Chocolate Drops; Martin, Bogan & Armstrong (Martin, Bogan & the Armstrongs)

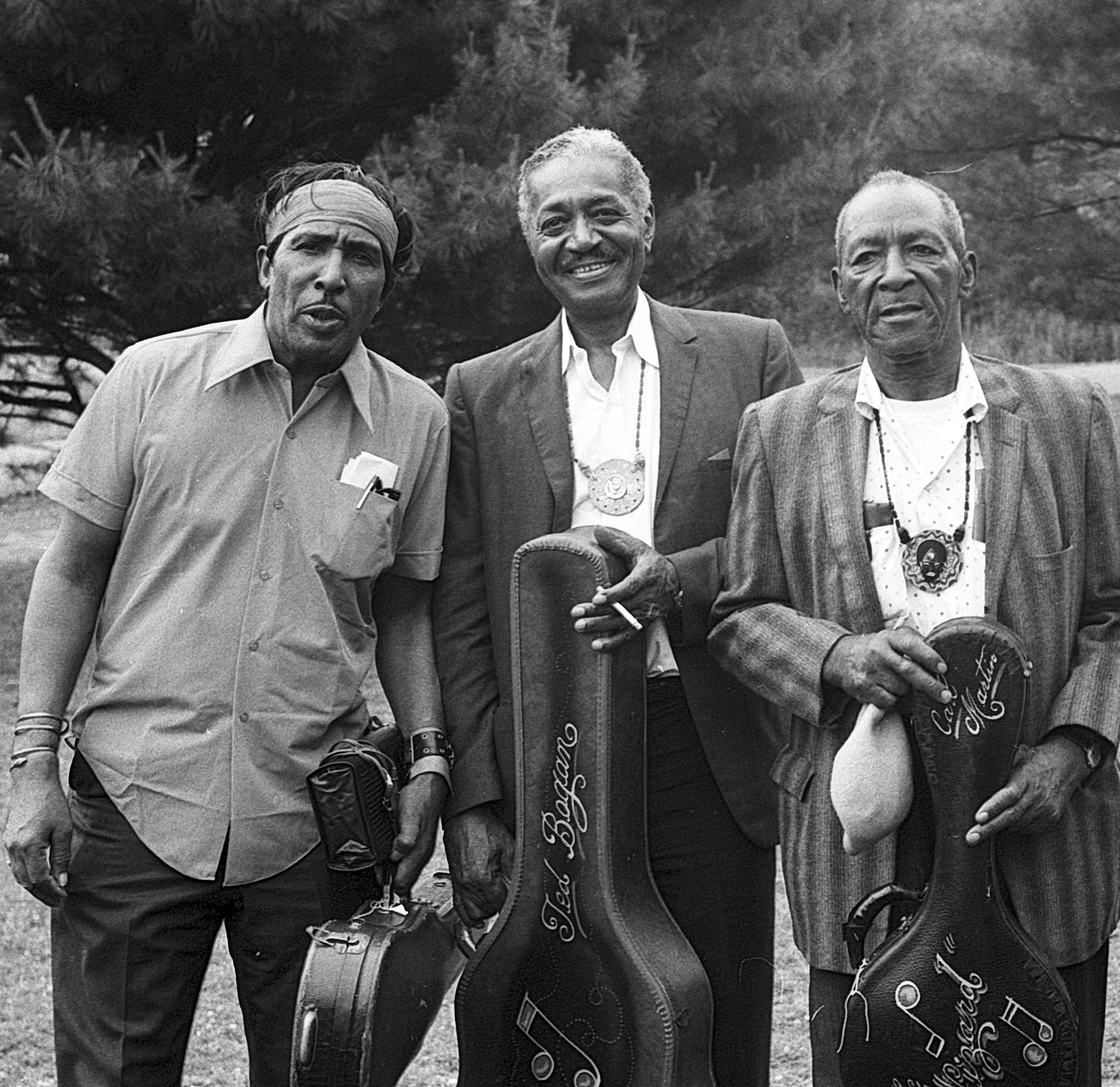
(L-R) Howard Armstrong, Ted Bogan, Carl Martin, Medford, Massachusetts, 1973.

Theodore R. Bogan (May 10, 1909 – January 29, 1990) was an American country blues guitarist, singer and songwriter, best known for his work with Howard Armstrong and Carl Martin. His career spanned over 50 years. His finger-picking guitar style was much admired. He played in various string bands for most of his career, including Martin, Bogan & Armstrong (or Martin, Bogan & the Armstrongs).

== Biography ==
Bogan was born in Spartanburg, South Carolina. He learned to play a finger-picking style of guitar in his adolescence, being initially influenced by Leroy Carr and Blind Blake, both of whom he heard on his family's radio set. It is claimed that he began performing in a medicine show, and appeared on radio broadcasts in Spartanburg. After meeting Carl Martin, Bogan moved to Knoxville, Tennessee. They played extensively on street corners, with Bogan enhancing his guitar playing to incorporate flatpicking. His first recordings were made for Bluebird Records in 1934, for which he performed with Howard Armstrong, whom he had met four years earlier. They recorded "State Street Rag" and "Ted's Stomp" for Bluebird, with Armstrong using the stage name Louie Bluie, which had been given to him by a fan.

In the 1940s, they appeared as part of the Four Keys, who toured in the Midwest. Later, in Chicago, they recorded as the backing group for Bumble Bee Slim. Their group changed its name to the Tennessee Chocolate Drops, designed to exploit opportunities in both the race record market and the audience for hillbilly music on radio and records. More often joined by Howard Armstrong, they performed for years in several acoustic string band formats under different names. The group played a mixture of musical genres and styles, including the blues, jazz, pop, country, and various non-English favorite melodies. The introduction of jukeboxes and electric musical ensembles reduced their popularity.

In the 1970s, a revival of interest in string bands saw Bogan and Martin still based in Chicago. In 1974, Martin, Bogan & Armstrong played at the 36th National Folk Festival, at Wolf Trap Farm Park in Vienna, Virginia. Martin died in 1979, but Bogan and Armstrong continued until Bogan's death.

Bogan and Armstrong appeared and performed in the 1985 documentary film Louie Bluie, directed by Terry Zwigoff, who had been inspired to seek them out after listening to "State Street Rag". The long-term relationship between Bogan and Armstrong was often frayed, rivalling the situation between Brownie McGhee and Sonny Terry.

Bogan died in Detroit, Michigan, in January 1990, aged 80.

== Partial discography ==
=== Singles ===
Year	Title	Record label
1934	"There's Nothing in This Wide World For Me" / "I'm Through With You"	Bluebird Records
1934	"State Street Rag" / "Ted's Stomp"	Bluebird Records

Both singles were credited to Louie Bluie and Ted Bogan

=== Albums ===
1974	Martin, Bogan, and Armstrong	Flying Fish
1978	That Old Gang of Mine	Flying Fish
1985	Louie Bluie	Arhoolie

== See also ==
- List of country blues musicians

== Recognitions ==
- 1989 Festival of Michigan Folklife
- Jus' Blues Museum
