= Elise Siegel =

American visual artist

- Born: 1952 (age 73–74); Newark, New Jersey, U.S.
- Education: Emily Carr University of Art and Design, University of Chicago
- Known for: Sculpture, installation art
- Awards: Anonymous Was A Woman Award, New York Foundation for the Arts, Virginia A. Groot Foundation
- Website: www.elisesiegel.com

Elise Siegel (born 1952) is an American sculptor and installation artist based in New York City. She is known for several bodies of figurative work that use subtle and ambiguous gesture and facial expression to evoke psychic and emotional states. In the 1990s, she first gained recognition for garment-like constructions that blurred boundaries between clothing, skin and body, critiquing the roles fashion and plastic surgery play in the construction of sexual and cultural identity; writer Mira Schor included Siegel among the cohort of artists she dubbed "Generation 2.5" and credited for developing the tropes of feminist art. After shifting to clay as her primary material, Siegel was one of a number of artists in the 2000s whose work spurred a rebirth in figurative ceramics emphasizing emotional expression, social conditions, identity and narrative. Her ceramic work—which ranges from roughly modeled portrait busts to highly charged, theatrical installations—is said to capture fleeting moments of internal struggle, conflict and vulnerability, creating a psychological tension with the viewer.

Elise Siegel, rough edges, partial installation view, twelve ceramic portrait busts on plywood stands, busts approx. 24”- 28”, overall dimensions variable, 2019, Studio10, Brooklyn, NY.

Siegel has exhibited at institutions including the Museum of Fine Arts Houston (MFAH), The Museum at FIT, Mississippi Museum of Art, Chazen Museum of Art, Neuberger Museum of Art and the Third World Ceramic Biennale in South Korea, among others. She has received the Anonymous Was A Woman Award and fellowships from the New York Foundation for the Arts, and her work belongs to the public art collections of MFAH and the Chazen Museum of Art. Siegel has taught ceramics at Greenwich House Pottery since 1984.

== Early life and career ==
Siegel was born in Newark, New Jersey in 1952. She studied at the University of Chicago from 1969 to 1971, before enrolling at the Emily Carr University of Art and Design in Vancouver, British Columbia, where she earned a BFA and did postgraduate studies (1980–1). She focused on ceramics as an undergraduate, but after moving to New York City in 1982, explored other materials for roughly the first decade of her professional career. Musician and songwriter, Dick Siegel, is her brother.

Siegel first received attention in the 1980s for wall and floor sculptures exhibited at Laurie Rubin Gallery (her first solo show, 1987) and SculptureCenter in New York and at the Williams Center for the Arts at Lafayette College, among other venues. Siegel made these sculptures from sheets of wire mesh that she coated with layers of pigmented or painted modeling paste. After cutting the sheets up, she sewed the pieces together with wire to make volumetric forms, then twisted the constructions, creating rich surfaces of cracks, chips, and exposed veins of underpaint and mesh. While fully abstract, the sculptures conveyed anatomical or animistic qualities, often suggesting bodies with articulated, extending appendages. ARTnews likened them in color and texture to bone or fossils with hints of prior life and weathering, and in form, to the biomorphic abstractions of Eva Hesse, Jean Arp and Constantin Brâncuși.

Elise Siegel, Portrait #6, wire mesh and acrylic modeling paste, 22" × 16" x 6", 1992.

== Mature work and critical reception ==
Throughout her mature career, Siegel has concentrated on three-dimensional work that emphasizes materials, the art-making process, and the human body and psyche. She has produced three broad bodies of work: feminist, garment-like constructions during the 1990s; figurative ceramic installations and sculpture during the latter 1990s and 2000s; and ceramic portrait busts in the 2010s.

=== Garment constructions (1990s) ===
Beginning in 1991, Siegel took a more sociopolitical direction, employing feminist critique and psychological investigation in sculptures that resembled female-gendered clothing and referenced the body metaphorically through its absence. This work developed formally and materially out of her abstract sculpture and was widely shown in the first half of the decade, in group exhibitions—at the Neuberger Museum ("Empty Dress," 1993) and Museum at FIT ("Fashion Is a Verb," 1995), among others—and a solo show, "Second Skin" (College of Charleston, 1993). Siegel animated the garments (skirts, dresses, pinafores, corsets, bras and tutus) with wires that suggested hair, creating movement and allowing her to draw in space. Their patched and cracked, pigmented surfaces evoked skin, while straps and stitched wire seams suggested bandages and psychological/cultural constriction. Curator and writer Nina Felshin identified these works as "concrete aesthetic parallels" to contemporary cultural theory, which revealed the role of clothing in definitions and transformations of female identity by, in essence, turning social construction "inside out so the stitching shows."

In her "Portrait" series, Siegel created a series of bra forms in response to the Dow Corning breast implant crisis of 1992. It included Portrait #6 (1992), a corset and tutu doubling as a female torso that drew a connection between foundational garments that "mold and shape" and bodies altered by cutting into flesh. The sculpture's rough, tangled construction equated garment straps—both intimate and strangling—with medical bandages, while its frayed, faded edges and Frankensteinian wire stitching evoked struggle and damage, conveying a sense of horror regarding the movement to surgery as reinvention, which wounded as much as enhanced women. In another series, Siegel explored apron forms, employing webs of wire that simultaneously read as (pubic) hair and skirt (e.g., Hairskirt, 1993), alluding to the garment's original function as a protection against the "polluting" power of genitalia.

Elise Siegel, Into the room of dream/dread, I abrupt awake clapping, eight life-size ceramic figures on wooden chairs, overall dimensions variable, 2001, Museum of Fine Arts, Houston.

=== Figurative ceramic installations and sculpture ===
In the mid-1990s, Siegel returned to clay, looking for a more immediate, tactile material from which to create directly figurative work. She initially produced fragments—ghostly heads, tightly clasped hands, dangling arms—before turning to installations of life-size, hollow doll or puppet-like figures, that Eleanor Heartney described as "psychologically complex tableaux of children of curiously ambiguous sexuality." Village Voice critic Robert Shuster wrote that these works derived an uncanny, foreboding power from what he called "Siegel's process of golem-like creation," a schematic form of modeling that foregrounded a sutured together look with rotating parts and misalignments. She hand-built the figures whole out of clay coils, cut them into parts to fit into the kiln, then reassembled them, leaving visible seams along shoulders, wrists and waists, with heads sometimes resting at awkward angles.

Siegel's installations combined carefully arranged stagecraft and a precise sense of gesture and choreography to create ambiguous scenes with the uncanny quality of dreams. Her first, Into the room of dream/dread, I abrupt awake clapping (2001), was installed in a heavily curtained, dimmed gallery, and consisted of seven seated children arrayed in a loose circle around another child, in an uncertain place of honor or reproach. The figures were colored a dull, even gray and modeled in doughy fashion, with simple, punched-in eyes, detailed extremities, and separately fired heads set on small wedges so they could be rotated to fix the gazes. Seated upright with tense dangling feet and hands in front of their chests arrested in the act of clapping—excepting the central child—the children tilted their heads inquisitively toward the gallery entrance, mouths slightly ajar in silence. Reviewers noted the eerie reversal of focus—which made viewers the center of attention, as if they had interrupted a conversation or game at a moment of expectancy or dread—as an effective means of evoking a sense of repression and anxiety associated with childhood.

Elise Siegel, Twenty-four Feet, twelve slightly smaller than adult-size figures, ceramic, aqua resin, fabric, wooden stands, overall dimensions variable, 2004, Garth Clark Project Space, Long Island City, NY.

Three subsequent installations employed children’s bodies divided into upper and lower halves, which Sculpture critic Edward Rubin wrote, projected "a chillingly real psychic turbulence." In Twenty-four Feet (2004), Siegel placed two neat rows of girls—lower bodies only—seated on facing chairs without seat bottoms, exposing them from below. The lower torsos were open at the waist and hollow, intensifying a sense of vulnerability already created by the open seat bottoms. The figures were arranged so that their playfully rendered stockinged feet nearly touched; Art in America's Nancy Princenthal wrote, "flexed and pointed, toes curled and spread, they communicate with uninhibited eloquence" an innocence so potent that it plunged viewers "into a total immersion in childhood."

Diametrically opposite in tone, Twenty-one Torsos (2004) depicted twenty-one upper bodies in pairs or groups of three with arms and fists waving (but never quite touching), each perched on a rolling metal stand. Siegel modeled the figures with boyish cropped hair, tight sleeveless t-shirts, and vague, somewhat helpless expressions of uncertainty that belied an aggressive scene Princenthal called "an unstable cloud of silent strife." In I am what is around me (2007), Siegel created a similar grouping of unsmiling, nearly identical boys—upper halves, mounted on black stands—that seemed to enact a cultish playground ritual or game; in his review, Robert Shuster noted one boy who comes forward to present beseeching, blackened hands, implicating the viewer as a possible intruder or corrupter.

=== Ceramic portrait busts ===
In the 2010s, Siegel has concentrated on hand-built ceramic busts that explore human interiority. This work draws on historical empowered objects, such as the Jōmon period Dogū and Haniwa funeral figures of prehistoric and third-to-sixth-century Japan, respectively, European iron helmets, Renaissance reliquary busts, idols and African masks. The life-sized to 24"-inch sculptures—presented on pedestals or plinths—are not portraits of specific people, but works created from memory and imagination. Reviews describe the heads as anonymous and universal—suggestive but indeterminate in terms of race and gender, and mutable in registering fleeting passages of disquiet, unease or indecision. Their fleshy features range in modeling from naturalistic to lumpy and crude, with glazing that shifts from subtly layered patina-like surfaces to provisional and raw; most are fired in two pieces, leaving a visible crack at the base of the neck.

Critics such as Nina Felshin and Ann Landi suggest that these features translate into emotional vulnerability and warmth and stimulate personal projection by viewers, a key to Siegel’s work. Romanov Grave described her attention to the subtleties of expression, modeling and surface application as a vocabulary evoking "the injuries of the world as worn by the body … articulating the pathos, horror and eros of daily human experience." In his review in Hyperallergic of Siegel's exhibition "Rough Edges" (2019, Studio 10), Stephen Maine commented on the faces' complex, equivocal emotions—for example, hovering between stoicism and disappointment (in Pale Blue Portrait Bust with Dark Drips, 2018) or incomprehension and muted chagrin (Portrait Bust with Amber Shirt and Lavender Hair, 2016): "the viewer is struck by these multifaceted yet understated attitudes and shaded emotional states because they are embodied in the work through such direct, primal means. We appreciate the fine-tuning wrought upon these clumps of mud even as we let ourselves be taken in by it."

== Awards and collections ==
Siegel has received fellowships from the New York Foundation for the Arts (2017, 2007, 1988), MacDowell Colony (1988) and Yaddo (1986), the Anonymous Was A Woman Award in 2014, and awards from the Virginia A. Groot Foundation (2016) and Canada Council (1982, 1981). Her work belongs to the public art collections of the Museum of Fine Arts, Houston, Chazen Museum of Art, Museum of Anthropology at UBC, and Arario Gallery (Seoul, Korea).
