= Carl Martin (musician) =

American blues musician (1906–1979)

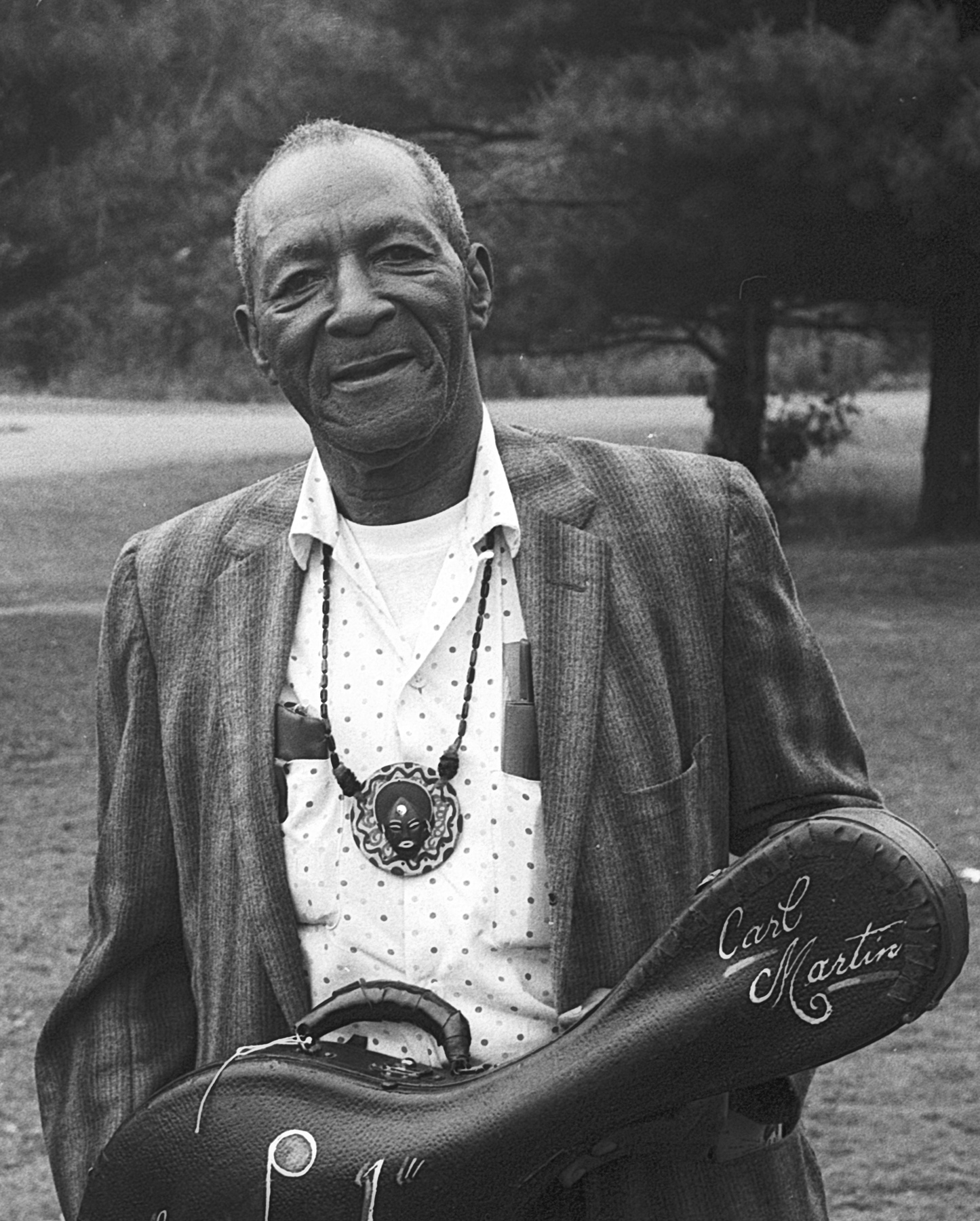
- Martin in Medford, Massachusetts, 1973.

Background information
- Born: April 1, 1906
- Origin: Big Stone Gap, Virginia, United States
- Died: May 10, 1979 (aged 73); Pontiac, Michigan, United States
- Genres: Country blues Appalachian music Old-time music Piedmont blues East Coast blues
- Occupation(s): Musician, singer
- Instrument(s): Guitar, mandolin, violin, bass violin, vocals
- Years active: 1934–1960s

Carl Martin (April 1 or 15, 1906 – May 10, 1979) was an American Piedmont blues musician and vocalist who was proficient at playing several instruments and performed in various musical styles.

Martin was born in Big Stone Gap, Virginia. He made his earliest recordings as a member of several groups, including the Four Keys, the Tennessee Chocolate Drops, and the Wandering Troubadours. He also performed in the trio Martin, Bogan, and Armstrong (with Ted Bogan and Howard Armstrong), helping keep alive the African-American old-time music string band tradition in Appalachian music.

He accompanied Chicago musicians, such as Bumble Bee Slim and Tampa Red, throughout the 1930s. His solo work recorded in the 1930s is also notable; songs such as "Crow Jane" and "Old Time Blues" feature his remarkable guitar accompaniment. From the 1930s onwards, Martin regularly played solo in the Chicago area, with a repertoire encompassing blues, jazz, pop, country, and even non-English songs. He played second guitar behind Freddie Spruell on the 1935 recording of the latter's song "Let's Go Riding". The track was featured in the soundtrack of the 2001 film Ghost World.

Martin reunited with Bogan and Armstrong in the 1970s and played at folk and blues music festivals across the United States.

Martin died in Pontiac, Michigan, in May 1979, at the age of 73.

The songwriter Steve Goodman paid tribute to Martin in his song "You Better Get It While You Can (The Ballad of Carl Martin)". On the liner notes of his posthumously released Santa Ana Winds LP record, Goodman wrote, "Carl Martin was the greatest entertainer I ever played with. He appears on several (Flying Fish and Yazoo) records, with or without his cronies Ted Bogan and Howard Armstrong... Carl and I became friends in the early Seventies, and his inspiration rules my musical character to this day. He's gone now, but I will never forget the night he met my grandmother at 'The Earl of Old Town.' Neither will she."

== See also ==
- List of country blues musicians
- List of East Coast blues musicians
- List of Piedmont blues musicians
