= Amber Moon Productions =

American nonprofit in Kentucky (1978–1980s)

- Formation: 1978; 48 years ago
- Founder: Sue Ann Salmon, Barbara Dumesnil, Jackie Gruer
- Dissolved: c. 1986
- Type: Nonprofit
- Location: Lexington, Kentucky, U.S.

Amber Moon Productions was an all-female nonprofit organization founded in 1978 in Lexington, Kentucky, dedicated to bringing nationally recognized musical acts, unique educational opportunities, and cultural arts events to central Kentucky. While their events were open to everyone, Amber Moon's programming especially resonated with women, particularly lesbians. The group placed a large focus on music, film, poetry, theater, and feminist issues.

== History ==
Amber Moon Productions started in 1976 as a business geared to marketing women's music, but was later reorganized as a women's performance collective on August 14, 1978. At the time of incorporation, the board of directors consisted of Sue Ann Salmon, Barbara Dumesnil, and Jackie Gruer. Salmon was a notable Kentucky environmentalist and community activist until her death in 2010. Some of the other women on Amber Moon's Board of Directors throughout the organization's existence include Phyllis Giberson, Mary Dunn, Laura Van Slyke, and Betsy Rodenbush.

The organization's name held personal significance to the members as they saw the rising moon as a symbol of women gaining strength. Their feminist approach to programming was intersectional in its representation of a diverse community of women. While deeply involves with the Lexington lesbian community, the group worked to counteract the lesbian label to avoid alienating other women from their events.

Amber Moon had no dedicated space and informally worked out of collective members’ homes. The organization was an affiliate member of the Lexington Council of the Arts from 1980 to 1984. While their primary funding came through grants from the Kentucky Arts Commission and the Lexington Fayette Urban-County Government, they also raised money through private contributions, ticket sales, and other grant opportunities.

Amber Moon worked to host and promote women's cultural events in Lexington and the surrounding areas. They saw their purpose as bringing uniquely talented women musicians, dancers, poets, and thespians to Lexington. While similar to other women's music organizations in the United States, co-founder Barbara Dumesnil emphasized that Amber Moon aimed to provide a more well-rounded cultural experience for women:

"Most of them do music, but we try to do more. And there aren’t many cities this size (that have a women’s arts production company). It’s hard to support a special-interest population. But we seem to do pretty well. I think Lexington supports the arts."

== List of notable performers and collaborators ==
Some notable performances produced by Amber Moon include:

- Reel World String Band
- Sweet Honey In The Rock
- Holly Near on Tour for a Nuclear-Free Future
- June Jordan
- Cris Williamson

Production company collaborations include:

- At the Foot of the Mountain
- Mentoress Productions
- Off the Wall Distribution
- WomanSound, Jubilee, WomanShine
- Women's Theater of Cincinnati
- Roadwork
- Sea Friends Records
- National Women's Music Festival
- Participated in the National Women's film circuit

== Legacy ==
According to the Kentucky Secretary of State website, Amber Moon's nonprofit status is currently inactive, with no annual reports published after July 1, 1986.

A large collection of Amber Moon records and scrapbooks are held at the University of Kentucky’s Special Collections Research Center.

The group is memorialized in a traveling LGBTQ history exhibition from the Faulkner Morgan Archive and included in a set of street banners celebrating LGBTQ history.
