= Ira Bernstein =

American dancer (born 1959)

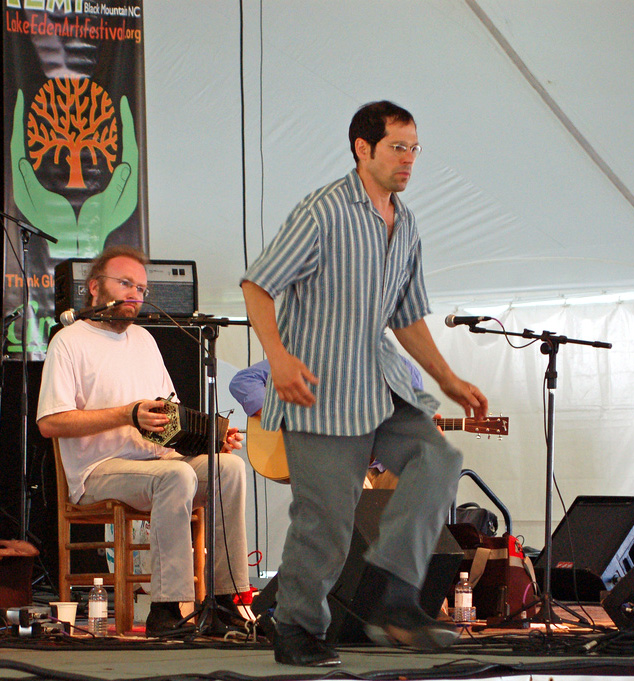
- Ira Bernstein performing with Niall Vallely in 2008
- Born: 1959 (age 66–67); Malverne, New York, U.S.
- Education: University of Pennsylvania (B.A.)
- Occupations: Dancer, teacher
- Years active: 1978-present
- Website: http://www.tentoepercussion.com/bio.htm

Ira Bernstein (born 1959) is an American dancer and teacher who specializes in traditional American dance forms such as Appalachian-style clogging, flatfoot dancing, tap dance, and step dancing. He is considered an authority on clogging, and the leading figure in this dance style. He calls himself a "percussive step dancer who specializes in Appalachian flatfooting," and also dances Green Grass style Appalachian clogging, English clogging, French-Canadian step dancing, Irish step dancing, and South African gumboot dancing.

== Background and career ==
Bernstein was born and brought up in Malverne, New York, a suburb of New York City. Three of his four grandparents were of Russian and Polish Ashkenazic descent, and immigrated to the United States through Ellis Island around 1900. The fourth, his maternal grandfather, was born in Harlem, New York and was of German descent.

He attended the University of Pennsylvania from 1977 to 1981. It was there, in 1978, that he first became interested in traditional American dance and music. He is also an old-time fiddler, having also taken up the instrument while at the University of Pennsylvania. In 1981 he received a Bachelor's degree in Biological Basis of Behavior from the University of Pennsylvania.

Following his graduation, he lived in Marlboro, Vermont, where he apprenticed with Anthony Barrand, a specialist in English clog dancing and Morris dancing. Barrand was a mentor to Bernstein and exposed him to English, Irish, and Canadian clog and step dancing. He gave Bernstein private lessons in traditional English dance styles, and gave him unlimited access to his film archive. Bernstein then lived in the Washington, D.C./Baltimore, Maryland/Annapolis, Maryland area in 1983 and 1984, while performing with Fiddle Puppets. In 1985 he moved back to Malverne, New York to study tap dancing with Sandman Sims, for which he received a National Endowment for the Arts Apprentice Fellowship grant. He moved to Asheville, North Carolina in 1996.

Bernstein has performed throughout the United States, and toured in Canada, Europe, the Middle East, Turkey, and Japan. He directs the Ten Toe Percussion Ensemble, a group of step dance soloists, and has been a member of the Mill Creek Cloggers, Fiddle Puppets, Marlboro Morris and Sword, American Tap Dance Orchestra, and The Vanaver Caravan. He was a guest soloist with Rhythm in Shoes and was the lead soloist in the show Rhythms of the Celts, which ran for six weeks at the Waterfront Theatre in Belfast. He has frequently performed with the old-time musician Riley Baugus, with the duo show Appalachian Roots. He was the co-creator and co-artistic director of Mountain Legacy, a large-scale stage show of Appalachian clogging and related percussive step dance styles. The show, which was advertised as "America's response to Riverdance!", had a successful, weekend run at the Diana Wortham Theatre in Asheville.

Bernstein won first place at the Mount Airy Fiddler's Convention old-time flatfoot dance competition (in 1989, 1991, 1994, 1997, and 2005). He has also won awards at the Old Fiddler's Convention in Galax, Virginia, and at the Appalachian String Band Music Festival in Clifftop, Fayette County, West Virginia (first place in 2000, 2004, 2006, 2007, 2008, 2009, and 2010).

== Books ==
- 1984 - American Clogging Steps and Notation
- 1992 - Appalachian Clogging and Flatfooting Steps

== Discography ==
- 1988 - Ira Bernstein: Ten Toe Percussion: Clog, Tap, and Step Dancing (Global Village Music, C-307)
- 2002 - Appalachian Roots: Ira Bernstein and Riley Baugus (Yodel-Ay-Hee, CD-0046)

== Films ==
- 1988 - The Ten Toe Percussion Ensemble in Concert (concert performance)
- 1989 - Great Performances: Dance in America: Tap Dance in America with Gregory Hines (PBS)
- 1994 - Ira Bernstein LIVE! at the Alte Oper (concert performance)
- 1996 - Flatfooting Workshop (instructional)
- 2002 - Ira Bernstein Live and Un-Cut from the Pardoe Theatre (concert performance)
