= Freddie Spruell =

Musical artist (1893-1956)

- Also known as: Papa Freddie, Mr. Freddie
- Born: December 28, 1893; Lake Providence, Louisiana, United States
- Died: June 19, 1956 (aged 62) Chicago, Illinois, United States
- Genres: Delta blues; country blues
- Occupations: Guitarist; singer; songwriter
- Instruments: Guitar; vocals
- Years active: 1920s–1940s
- Labels: Okeh, Bluebird, Paramount

Freddie Spruell (December 28, 1893 – June 19, 1956) was an American Delta blues guitarist and singer, variously billed as Papa Freddie or Mr. Freddie. He is generally regarded as the first Delta bluesman to be recorded ("Milk Cow Blues", 1926), although Mamie Smith (1920), Ed Andrews (1923) and Blind Lemon Jefferson (1925) predated him in recording the first blues records. Details of his life are sketchy and sometimes contradictory.

== Early life ==
Spruell was probably born in Lake Providence, Louisiana. He relocated with his family to Chicago, Illinois, when he was a young child. His Social Security records gave his birth date as December 1893. In spite of his urban residence, his recordings are classed as Delta blues and are noted for his musical styling.

== Career ==
On June 25, 1926, Spruell recorded "Milk Cow Blues" in Chicago. The track was released by Okeh Records, backed with "Muddy Water Blues", recorded in November that year; both sides were credited to Papa Freddie.

His second single release was "Way Back Down Home", backed with the same recording of "Muddy Water Blues". He recorded two more songs in 1928, one of which was "Tom Cat Blues", issued by Paramount Records and credited to Mr. Freddie Spruell.

Five more songs were recorded in April 1935 and released by Bluebird Records under the name of Mr. Freddie. In this session he recorded "Let's Go Riding", his best-known song. Carl Martin played second guitar accompanying Spruell on the track.

All his recorded work is on the compilation album Mississippi Blues, Vol. 2 (1926–1935), The Complete Recorded Works of Arthur Petties, Freddie Spruell, Willie "Poor Boy" Lofton.

At the insistence of his mother, Spruell stopped playing secular music in the mid-1940s. He became a Baptist preacher.

== Death ==
Spruell died in Chicago in June 1956, after a lengthy stay in hospital. He was aged 62. No death certificate has been found.

In 2016 the Killer Blues Project placed a headstone for Freddie Spruell at Restvale Cemetery in Alsip, Illinois.

== Legacy ==
"Let's Go Riding" was used in the soundtrack of the 2001 film Ghost World.

== Discography ==
- Mississippi Blues, vol. 2 (1926–1935), The Complete Recorded Works of Arthur Petties, Freddie Spruell, Willie "Poor Boy" Lofton, Document Records, 1994

== See also ==
- List of Delta blues musicians
