= Greenwich House Pottery =

Pottery studio in New York City

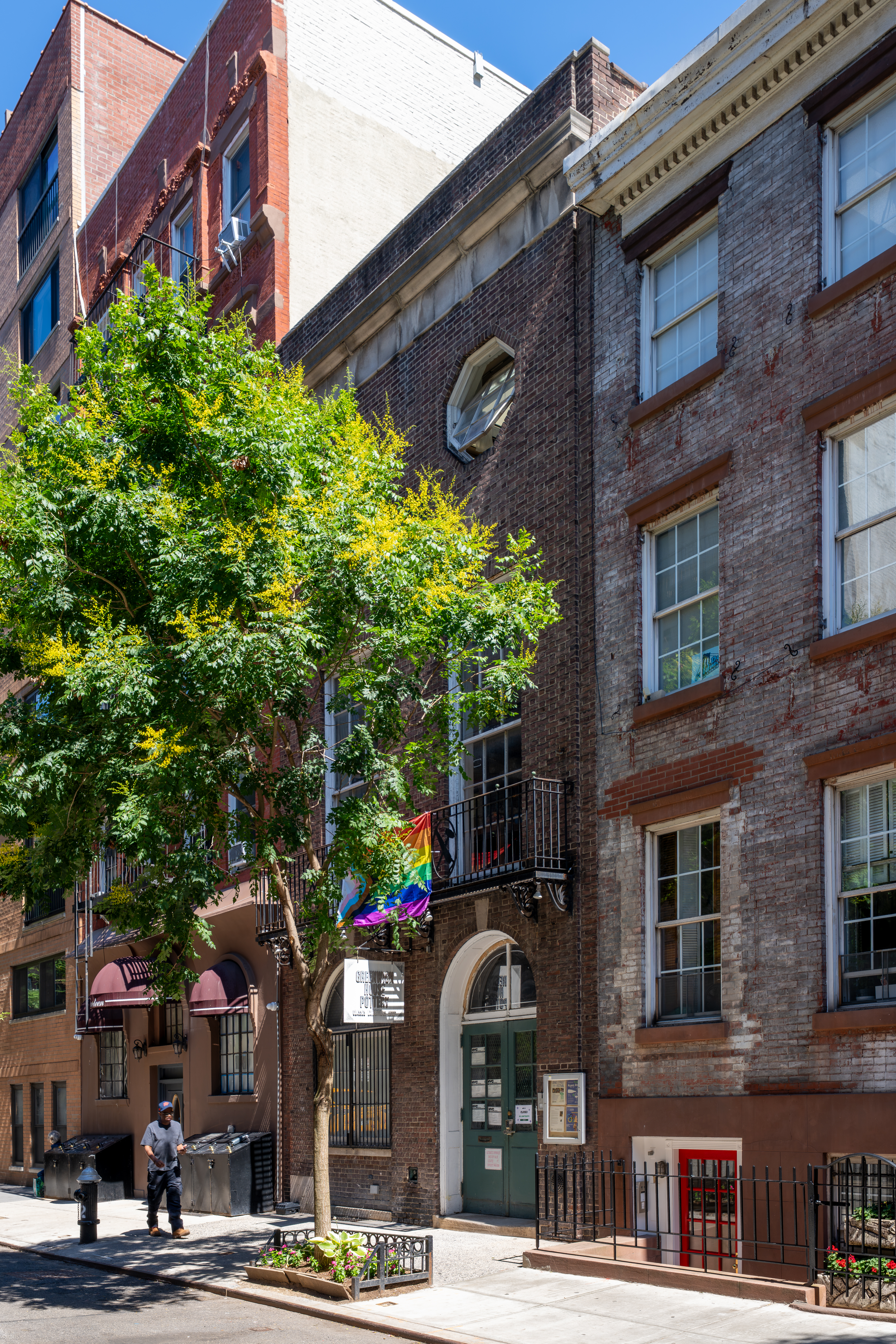
- Formation: 1909
- Type: Non-profit organization
- Location: 16 Jones Street, New York, New York
- Coordinates: 40°43′54.84″N 74°0′8.46″W
- Website: www.greenwichhouse.org/gh_pottery

Greenwich House Pottery is a non-profit pottery studio located in the West Village of New York City.

== History ==
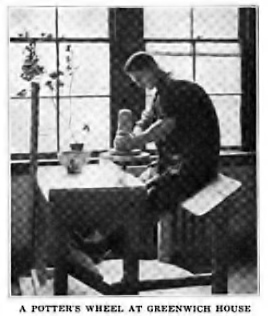
Potter's Wheel at Greenwich House Pottery

Greenwich House Pottery was founded in New York's Greenwich Village in 1909 as a part of the settlement house Greenwich House. Greenwich House provides arts education (including Greenwich House Music School, senior service and behavioral health programs.

Greenwich House Pottery was founded as a place both to teach pottery making skills by molding the clay or on a potter's wheel. It has taught children, from two years of age, since it was founded to provide a safe after-school and recreation program.

Notable ceramic artists who have taught at Greenwich House include Stanley Rosen (1956–59), Bernard Leach, Shōji Hamada, Peter Voulkos, Elise Siegel and Robert Turner. Israeli ceramist Siona Shimshi studied at Greenwich House.

== Location ==
The pottery studio is located in a Colonial Revival building designed by Delano & Aldrich at 16 Jones Street in Greenwich Village in New York City. It is located within the South Village Historic District, and was registered on February 24, 2014, as a National Register of Historic Places.

== Description ==
Greenwich House Pottery offers classes, including sculpting and firing, of six or twelve weeks in duration. There are day and evening classes for beginners to advanced students throughout the year. It teaches children, starting with toddlers, and adults. In addition to classes, it also offers lectures and workshops. It conducts exhibitions and performs outreach to the community.

Within Greenwich House Pottery is the Jane Hartsook Gallery. The Gallery was named in honor of Jane Hartsook, former Pottery Director, for her leadership role in making it "one of the nation's leading ceramic arts studios," according to Alfred University.

Owing, in part, to a renaissance in ceramics, enrollment at the pottery grew to a point where a major renovation was planned. Starting in 2019, the pottery will undergo substantial changes which include adding an elevator, expanded workspace, more kilns, and a roofdeck.
