= Samite (disambiguation) =

Samite may refer to:

- Samite, a heavy silk fabric, of a twill-type weave, worn in the Middle Ages
- Samite (musician), Ugandan-American musician
- SS Samite, a Liberty ship
