= Sally Rogers (musician) =

American folk singer

- Born: September 19, 1954 (age 71); New York City
- Occupation: Singer-songwriter
- Years active: 1979–present
- Spouse: Howard Bursen
- Children: Malana and Maya Rogers-Bursen
- Website: Official website

Sally Rogers (born September 19, 1954) is an American singer-songwriter, music educator, and Appalachian dulcimer player. She first reached a national audience in the early 1980s with her song "Lovely Agnes" and a series of appearances on A Prairie Home Companion. She is a frequent collaborator with Claudia Schmidt and Howard Bursen.

== Career ==
Sally Rogers began performing at folk festivals in 1979 after being encouraged to audition for the Canadian festival circuit by folk singer Stan Rogers. The two had met at the Ten Pound Fiddle Coffeehouse in East Lansing, Michigan, where Sally Rogers worked.

The same year, Rogers wrote the song "Lovely Agnes" for her grandmother's 92nd birthday. Never intending to perform the song publicly, Rogers sang it for her acquaintance Lisa Null, who learned it and taught it to Claudia Schmidt, Jean Redpath, and Helen Schneyer. The four performed the song on A Prairie Home Companion in 1980, resulting in host Garrison Keillor inviting Rogers to perform on the program. Rogers made a series of appearances on the show in the early 1980s, reaching a national audience.

== Awards and accolades ==
Sally Rogers' 1982 album Circle of the Sun won the "Best Folk Album of 1982" award from the National Association of Independent Record Distributors (NAIRD).

Two of Rogers' children's albums garnered the Parents' Choice Gold Award for Audio Recording: Piggyback Planet in 1990 and What Can One Little Person Do? in 1992. The latter also won the "Best Children’s Recording" award from NAIRD.

In 2017 Rogers received the Magic Penny award from the Children's Music Network.

== Discography ==
=== Solo albums ===
- The Unclaimed Pint (1980)
- In the Circle of the Sun (1982, Flying Fish Records)
- Love Will Guide Us (1985)
- Generations (1989)
- We'll Pass Them On (1995, Red House Records)
- Old Friends I’ve Never Met (2020)

==== Children's albums ====
- Peace By Peace (1988)
- Piggyback Planet (1990)
- What Can One Little Person Do? (1992)
- At Quiet O'Clock (1994)

=== Collaborations ===
==== With Howard Bursen ====
- Satisfied Customers (1984, Flying Fish Records)
- When Howie Met Sally (1990, Flying Fish Records)

==== With Claudia Schmidt ====
- Closing The Distance (1987, Flying Fish Records)
- While We Live (1991)
- Evidence Of Happiness (2012)
- We Are Welcomed (2016)

== Videography ==
- Sally Rogers Sings For Children (1994, Greenhays Recordings)
