= Barbara Ward Armstrong =

American sculptor

- Born: March 24, 1940; Cambridge, Massachusetts, U.S.
- Died: October 4, 2013; Boston, Massachusetts, U.S.
- Known for: fabric sculpture
- Spouse: Howard Armstrong (musician)
- Partner: Salim Abdul-Rahman

Barbara Ward Armstrong (March 24, 1940 - September 4, 2013) was an American artist who primarily worked in fabric sculptures, often called soft sculpture, and was heavily involved in artistic and musician communities throughout the United States.

== Early life ==
Ward Armstrong was born in Cambridge, Massachusetts to parents Frances Cole and Richard Herbert Ward and was their ninth and youngest daughter. Her father died when she was 7 years old and she was primarily raised by her grandmother, who taught her how to sew. She began sewing and creating dolls, crafts, and clothes when she was young.

After growing up in Cambridge near Harvard University, she graduated from the local Cambridge High & Latin, and then Emerson College, she then moved to New York in order to pursue dance and performance. There, she taught dance and designed costumes for the Billie Pope Dance Company.

== Artistic career ==
Ward Armstrong's work in soft sculpture began in the 70's when she made a doll for a friend's child. She was encouraged to pursue sculpture professionally by Barry Gaither and started creating larger-scale pieces depicting human-scale figures. Initially, her work was displayed mostly in the Boston area, but an installation at the California Afro-American Museum brought her work to a much wider audience.

A consistent objective in her life-size sculptures is, as Barry Gaither noted, to, "force a delightful but lasting dialogue between themselves and the viewers." Ward Armstrong frequently used bold color, fabrics from different cultures around the world, 3D objects, and abstraction to play with traditional forms of art, such as African masks and portraiture.

From 1978-1984, she was an artist-in-residence at Northeastern University. Her sculpture work has been exhibited at the Museum of Fine Arts in Boston, the California Afro-American Museum, the Harriet Tubman House, and the Institute of Contemporary Art, Boston.

She collaborated with her husband and musician Howard Armstrong on many creative ventures. A POV documentary released in 2002, Sweet Old Song, was made about their life together.

== Notable works ==
- New Race I, 1986
- New Race II, 1987-1988
- Life Begins at 70, 1988
- Let My People Go, 1989
