= Ray Kamalay =

American jazz guitarist and singer

Ray Kamalay is an American jazz guitarist and singer from Detroit, Michigan who has recorded several jazz records with his group, the Red Hot Peppers. Kamalay is noted for his work with many folk music groups and notable jazz artists such as the Chenille Sisters, Johnny Frigo, and Howard Armstrong. Kamalay is also well known for his work in music education, giving lectures and demonstrations on folk music topics.

== Career ==
After completing a degree in philosophy from the University of Detroit, Kamalay began his career as a professional musician in 1974, concentrating on historic American music such as folk and jazz. In 1983, he formed his regular band, the Red Hot Peppers. The Red Hot Peppers has included several notable jazz musicians over the years, including the Chenille Sisters, Johnny Frigo, and Howard Armstrong, and trumpet player Walter White, who formerly played with the Harry Connick, Jr. orchestra. His collaboration with Armstrong earned Kamalay a W.C. Handy Award nomination in 1998.

In 2008, Kamalay began a music education program named "Freedom, Slavery and the Roots of American Music" in which he uses the guitar to demonstrate sounds from a variety of musical movements. He connects those movements with major periods and events in American history, such as the time of slavery. He has performed the program in celebration of Black History Month throughout Michigan.

== Discography ==
Ray Kamalay

- 1993 – Vignettes

Ray Kamalay and his Red Hot Peppers

- 1988 – I Saw Stars
- 1997 – The Joint is Jumpin'
- 1997 – Love's Hope
- 2000 – Meet Me Where They Play the Blues

The Howard Armstrong Trio

- 1995 – Louie Bluie
