= Claudia Schmidt (musician) =

American musician (born 1953)

- Born: 1953 (age 71–72); New Baltimore, Michigan, United States
- Genres: Folk, jazz
- Occupation(s): Songwriter, musician
- Instrument(s): vocals, guitar, dulcimer
- Years active: 1970s–present
- Labels: Flying Fish, Rounder, Redhouse
- Website: Official website

Claudia Schmidt (born 1953) is an American musician, originally from New Baltimore, Michigan, United States, who has recorded folk, jazz, blues, and spoken word albums. She plays guitar and Appalachian dulcimer and sings. She has appeared numerous times on the radio program, A Prairie Home Companion. She has recorded with Paul Cebar and Peter Ostroushko as well as Steve Tibbetts. She also appeared in a documentary film, Gap-Toothed Women, by Les Blank.

Schmidt was interviewed about her approach to the 12-string guitar in the September 1988 Frets magazine, "Special Issue: Beyond 6 Strings"; the article, entitled 'Sweeter By The Dozen: The Magic Of The 12-String Guitar (by Mark Hansen & Richard Bamman)' features her photo on page 27 and comments on page 35.

Schmidt has been a well-known fixture in the folk/acoustic music scene since her earliest days performing in the late 1970s. She began performing at Amazingrace Coffeehouse in Evanston, Illinois. Her first self-titled recording on Flying Fish Records — since bought out by Rounder Records — was a success. She recorded four solo entrees with this label, and one duo recording with Sally Rogers. In 1987, she started a relationship with the budding record label Red House Records where she recorded another five albums, including one more duo with Sally Rogers. All ten of the above recordings were clearly in the folk/acoustic domain.

In 2001, she ventured off into independent status with her first full-fledged jazz recording, Live at the Old Rectory Pub. She has since recorded other independent efforts including two jazz CDs, and folk/acoustic CD, and a spoken word CD.

Schmidt has also made a name for herself in musical theater around the midwest. She has scored the music for several plays including a Joseph Jefferson Award winning effort for A Good Person of Szechuan mounted by the Goodman Theatre in Chicago in 1992.

In 2006, Schmidt recorded the soundtrack for a new documentary Motherhood Manifesto, by John de Graaf, author of Take Back Your Time. She also starred in a musical telling of the Edmund Fitzgerald tragedy titled The Gales of November. This theater piece tells the tragic story of the sinking of this mighty ore ship from the point of view of the wives of several fated crew members.

Schmidt continues to write and record. She maintains an active touring schedule from coast to coast. She lives in Northeast Connecticut.
