= Preacher Jack =

- Born: John Lincoln Coughlin; February 12, 1942
- Died: April 25, 2020 (aged 78)
- Occupation: Pianist

Preacher Jack was the stage name of John Lincoln Coughlin (born February 12, 1942), who is an American pianist. Coughlin taught himself piano growing up in Malden, Massachusetts, and became an underground success playing in Boston in the 1960s and 1970s. George Thorogood heard him play and had him signed to Rounder Records, for whom he would record two albums in the 1980s. He took an extended break from recording in the 1990s and continued touring, finally releasing new material, including another album on Rounder, late in the decade.

He died in Tewksbury, Massachusetts on April 25, 2020 at the age of 78, from COVID-19-related causes.

== Discography ==
Records:

Rounder Records 1979 - “Rock n Roll Preacher” - full-length record
Rounder Records 1980 - “3000 Barrooms Later” - full-length record
Solo Art Records 1996 - “Preacher Jack At The Piano Non-Stop Boogie - full-length CD
Black Rose Records 1998 - “Celebration of the Spirit” - full-length CD
Cow Island Music 2007 - “Pictures From Life's Other Side” - full-length CD

Singles:

Rounder Records 1980 - “Almost Persuaded” - 45 rpm single
Sonet Records 1980 - “Break Up/Preachers Boogie Woogie” - 45 rpm import only single (Sonet was a subsidiary of Rounder)
Baron Records 1983 (?) - “Crazy Arms/You Win Again with It'll Be Me/Don't Be Cruel” - 45 rpm red vinyl single

Compilations:

Eagle Records - 1996 - “Rare Boston Rock A Billy Fifties Volume 2” - 2 songs on this CD
Make Some Noise Records - 2007 - “Music For The Great Boston Burlesque Exposition” - 1 song on this CD
Rounder Records - 2000 - “Roots Music: An American Journey CD” - 1 song on this CD
Lap to Cry on Records - 1998 - “Jerry Lee's Nightmare” from the CD “princecharlesmingusmansonbukowski“ by Jawn P (formerly of the Boston hip-hop act Top Choice Clique) - a tribute to Preacher Jack.
