= Volo Bogtrotters =

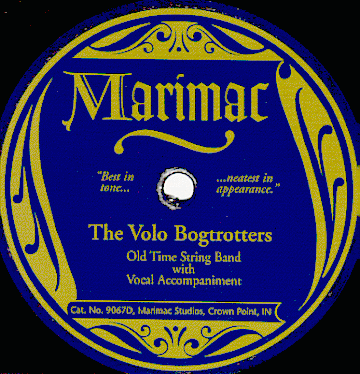

Background information
- Origin: Chicago, Illinois, U.S.
- Genres: String band

The Volo Bogtrotters are an old-time American string band, based in the Chicago area, that played songs and tunes from the string bands of the 1920s and fiddle music from the Midwest, as well as from other new and traditional sources. The band was together from circa 1984 to 2002 and during that period made four recordings on the Marimac Label. They played at many music festivals and traditional dance venues and were known for their driving twin fiddle sound and old songs gleaned from 78 rpm recordings. Six members of the band have recently united again (2011) to play occasional dances and festivals.

Members of the band included:

- Lynn Smith, fiddle, mandolin and vocals, formerly of the "Indian Creek Delta Boys" of Charleston, Illinois
- Fred Campeau, fiddle, banjo, guitar, slide guitar, ukulele and vocals, a popular fixture in the Chicago folk scene.
- Steve Rosen, banjo, fiddle, guitar, vocals.
- Tony Scarimbolo, bass and vocals, with the band from 1985-2002, 2011-.
- John Terr, guitar, with the band 1984-85.
- Mo Nelson, bass and vocals, with the band from 1984-85.
- Jim Nelson, guitar and vocals, with the band from 1985–91, 2011-.
- Larry MacBride, guitar and vocals, founder and owner of Marimac Recordings, with the band 1991-93.
- Paul Tyler, guitar, fiddle, mandolin, vocals, 1993–2002, 2011-.

== Discography ==
- "Volo Bogtrotters"
- "Tough Luck"
- "Backside of Buncombe"
- "Stringband With Vocal Accompaniment"
- "Hell Broke Loose in Volo"
