= Howard Armstrong (musician) =

American string band and country blues musician (1909–2003)

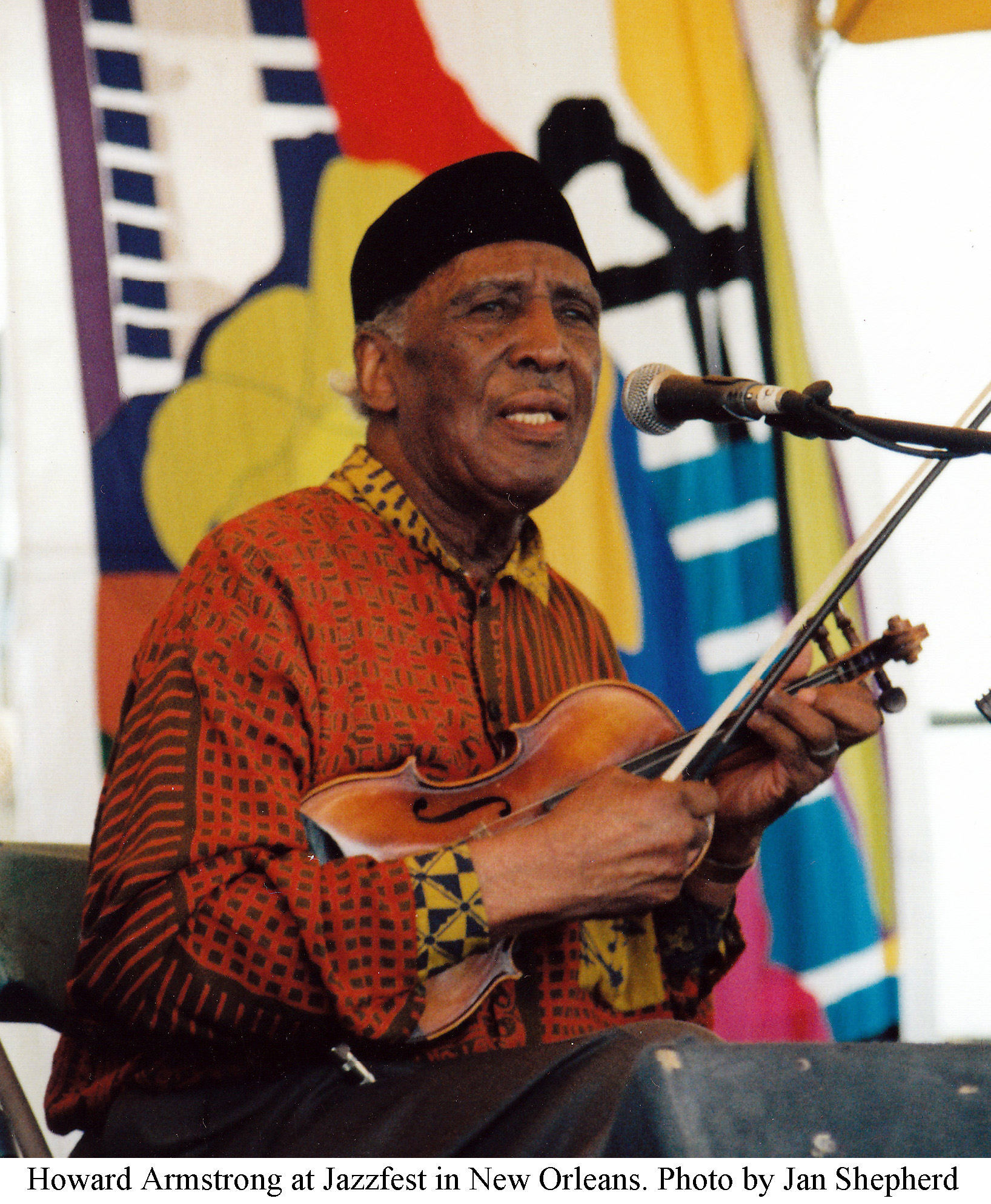
- Armstrong at the New Orleans Jazz and Heritage Festival, 1998

Background information
- Also known as: Louie Bluie
- Born: William Howard Taft Armstrong; March 4, 1909; Dayton, Tennessee, U.S.
- Died: July 30, 2003 (aged 94) Boston, Massachusetts, U.S.
- Genre: Country blues
- Occupation: Musician
- Instruments: Fiddle, mandolin, guitar, vocals
- Years active: 1920s–1990s
- Spouse: Barbara Ward Armstrong

Howard "Louie Bluie" Armstrong (March 4, 1909 – July 30, 2003) was an American string band and country blues musician, who played fiddle, mandolin, and guitar and sang. He was also a notable visual artist and raconteur.

== Early life ==
William Howard Taft Armstrong was born in Dayton, Tennessee, and grew up in LaFollette, Tennessee. He was the middle son from a musically talented family of nine children. His father was also a musician but supported his family with a job in a local steel mill.

As a young teenager he taught himself to play the fiddle and joined a band led by Blind Roland Martin and his brother Carl Martin. They toured the United States performing a wide range of music, from work songs and spirituals through popular Tin Pan Alley tunes and foreign-language songs. For a few years, Armstrong attended Tennessee State Normal School as an arts student studying painting and design, while also playing cello in the symphony orchestra as well as fiddle in a jazz band.

== Musical career ==
Armstrong, his brother Roland Armstrong, and Carl Martin, billed as the Tennessee Chocolate Drops, recorded for Vocalion Records at the St. James Hotel in Knoxville, Tennessee, on April 3, 1930. Adding guitarist Ted Bogan, the band toured as part of a medicine show and backed blues musicians such as Big Bill Broonzy and Memphis Minnie. As Martin, Bogan and Armstrong, they also performed at the 1933 World's Fair in Chicago. In 1934 Armstrong and Bogan recorded "State Street Rag" and "Ted's Stomp" for Bluebird Records, with Armstrong using the stage name Louie Bluie, which had been given to him by a fan.

Armstrong's early recordings are country rags or blues, but this was not his sole repertoire as a performer. According to his sometime accompanist, the writer Elijah Wald, his early theme song was the Gershwin standard "Lady Be Good", and his group's repertoire included a wide range of hit songs of the period, including Italian, Polish, Mexican and country songs, which he would play to meet the varying demands of his audience.

After serving in World War II, Armstrong moved to Detroit and worked in the auto industry until 1971. With a revival of interest in old-time African-American music, Martin, Bogan and Armstrong reunited. The band recorded, performed at clubs and festivals and went on a tour of South America sponsored by the U.S. State Department. They played together until Martin's death in 1979.

Around this time, both Armstrong and Bogan were contacted by the filmmaker Terry Zwigoff, a fan of their recording "State Street Rag". Zwigoff's interest in Armstrong eventually blossomed into a one-hour documentary, Louie Bluie, released in 1985. The long-term relationship between Bogan and Armstrong was often frayed, rivalling the situation between Brownie McGhee and Sonny Terry.

Armstrong was a recipient of a 1990 National Heritage Fellowship awarded by the National Endowment for the Arts, which is the United States government's highest honor in the folk and traditional arts. He and his wife, Barbara Ward Armstrong, were the subject of the 2002 POV documentary Sweet Old Song.

== Later life ==
He continued to perform with a younger generation of musicians and released his first solo album, Louie Bluie, in collaboration with Ralphe Armstrong and Ray Kamalay in 1995. The album earned him a W.C. Handy Blues Award nomination for Acoustic Album.

Armstrong was also an avid painter, designing album covers for his group and occasionally for other artists, including Wald. He designed the juke joint set for the 1985 Oscar-nominated film version of The Color Purple. He also made necklaces from beads, pipe cleaners and found objects. He spoke several languages; on a recording of the song "Chinatown, My Chinatown" he sang one of the verses in Mandarin, having translated it from English.

He died in Boston, Massachusetts, aged 94, following a heart attack.

== Legacy ==
The Louie Bluie Festival, held each year at Cove Lake State Park near Armstrong's childhood home of LaFollette, celebrates his music and legacy.

== Discography ==
- Louie Bluie (Blue Suit Records, 1995)
- Louie Bluie (Arhoolie Records, 1985)
- Martin, Bogan, & The Armstrongs: That Old Gang Of Mine (Flying Fish, 1978)
- Martin, Bogan & Armstrong: Martin, Bogan & Armstrong (Flying Fish, 1974)
- Martin, Bogan & Armstrong: The Barnyard Dance (Rounder Records, 1973)

== Filmography ==
- Louie Bluie (1985), directed by Terry Zwigoff
- Sweet Old Song (2002), directed by Leah Mahan

== Awards and honors ==
- 1990 – National Heritage Fellowship
- 1996 – W.C. Handy Blues Award nomination for Acoustic Album: Howard Armstrong, Ralphe Armstrong, & Ray Kamalay – Louie Bluie
- 2000 – W.C. Handy Blues Award nomination for Blues Instrumentalist - Other (Violin)
- 2003 – W.C. Handy Blues Award nomination for Blues Instrumentalist - Other (Mandolin)
- 2003 – Tennessee Governor's Award in the Arts
