= Dick Siegel =

American singer-songwriter (born 1948)

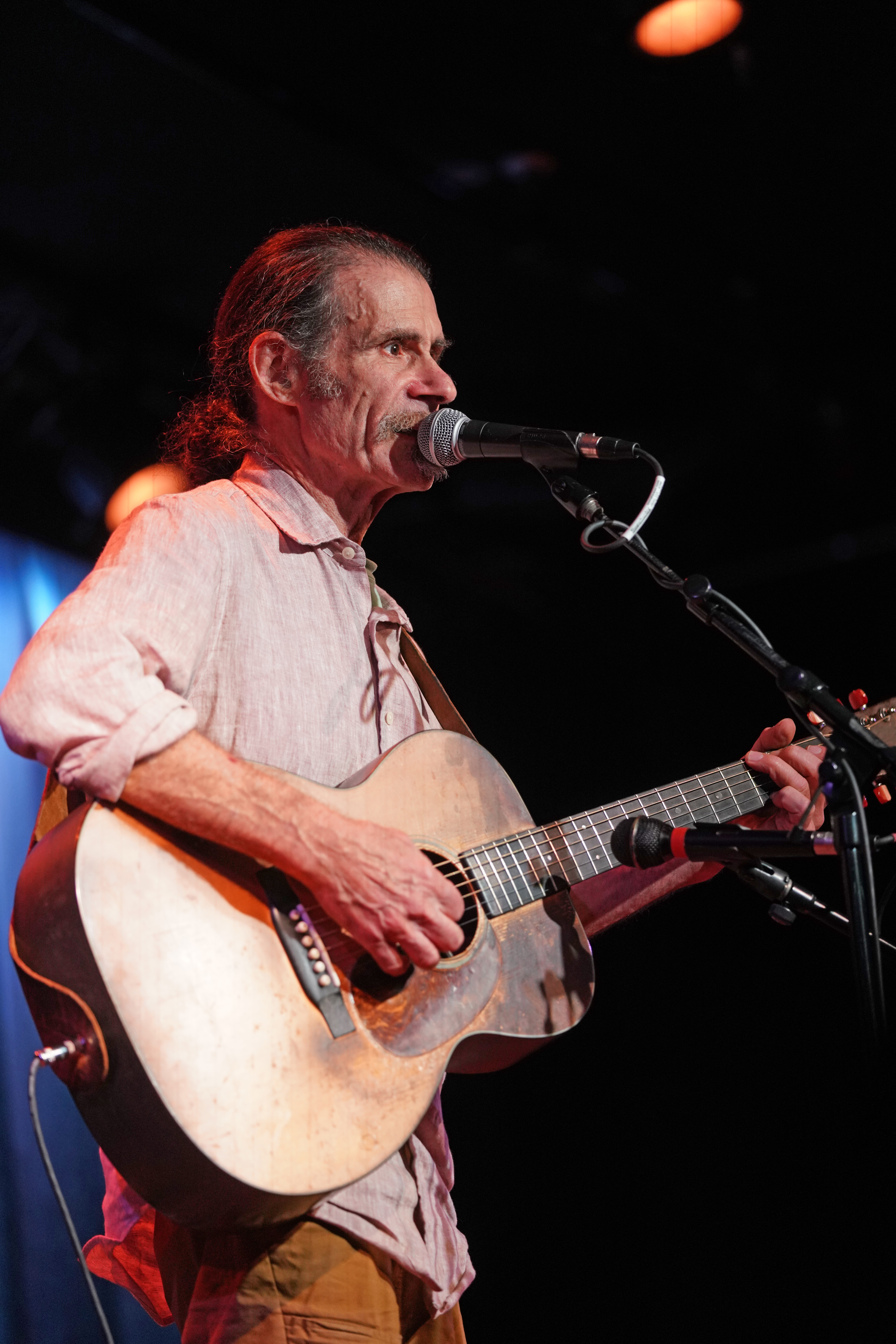
Musician Dick Siegel Performing

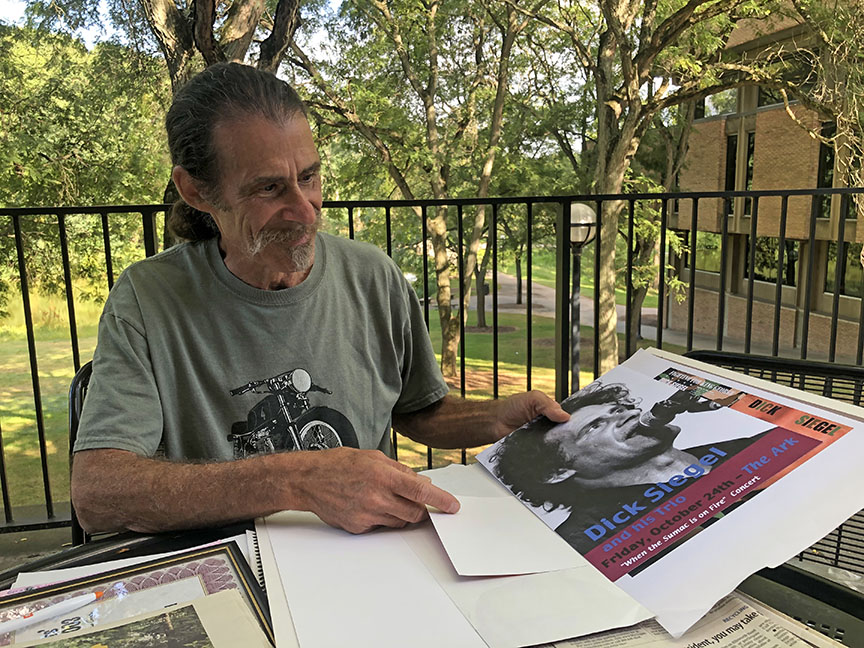
Singer-songwriter Dick Siegel in Ann Arbor, Michigan on September 15, 2021

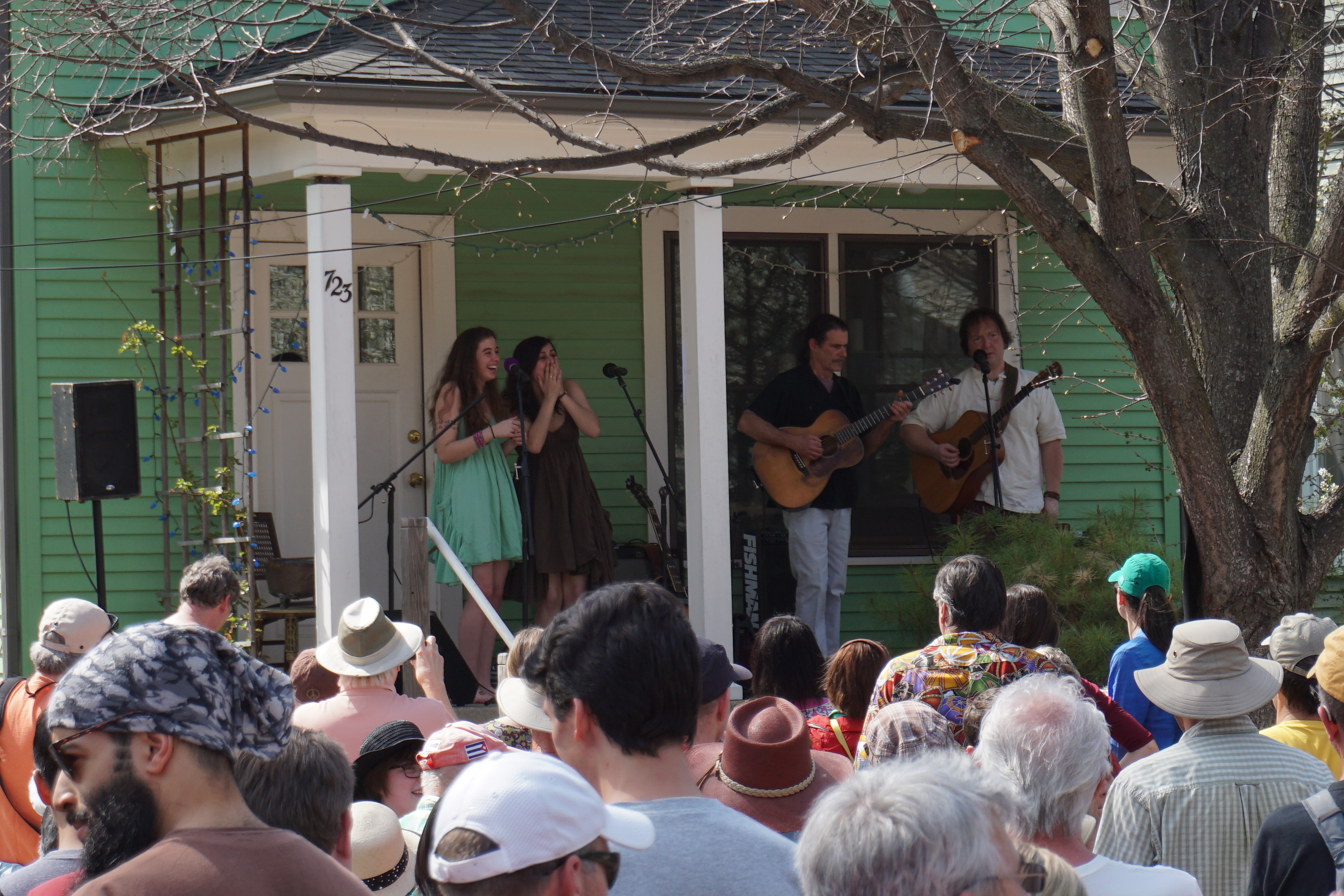
Dick Siegel performing at the 2015 Water Hill Music Fest in Ann Arbor

Dick Siegel (born Dec. 28, 1948) is an American singer-songwriter, guitarist, and visual artist. A long-time resident of Ann Arbor, Michigan—where he graduated from the University of Michigan in 1971—Siegel's debut album SNAP! appeared in 1980, featuring the song "Angelo's," a fan favorite celebrating an iconic local breakfast spot. He won the Best New Folk Artist award at the 1991 Kerrville Folk Festival as well as awards at the Napa Valley Songwriting Festival for his songs "What Would Brando Do?" and "Angels Aweigh." Multiple Detroit Music Awards led to his induction into the Detroit Music Hall of Fame.

== Life and career ==
Siegel was born in Newark, N.J. and began his musical activities in a British Invasion band as a drummer, inspired by the 1959 album Drums of Passion by Michael Babatunde Olatunji. After spending two summers at the Interlochen Center for the Arts as a theater and ceramics major, he enrolled at the University of Michigan in 1967 as a pre-medical student. Discovering poetry in his sophomore year, he became an English major. Realizing that he wanted to sing, he sold his drum set and used the proceeds to buy a guitar. Although he had been writing poetry, he did not write his first song until 1971, while on a road trip to the West Coast. Returning to Ann Arbor, he performed the song at a hoot night at The Ark (folk venue) and the positive audience response convinced him to focus on writing and performing original songs. Since the 1970s, Siegel has led a series of regional bands that perform primarily in the Ann Arbor-Detroit area, including Dick Siegel and the Ministers of Melody, Tracy Lee and the Leonards, and Dick Siegel and the Brandos. He developed his skills in regular sets at venues including Mr. Floods Party and the Blind Pig (venue), while The Ark has remained a home of semi-regular annual showcases throughout his 50-plus year career. He has appeared nationally and internationally at festivals including the Kerrville Folk Festival, Napa Valley Folk Festival, New Orleans Jazz and Heritage Festival, the Vancouver Folk Festival, and South by Southwest (1995). In 1988, Siegel appeared in Jay Stielstra's musical Tittabawassee Jane as Reg Washington, a "Vietnam vet whose mind has been unhinged by Agent Orange," which ran for two weeks at the Performance Network Theatre in Ann Arbor. When an arm injury made it impossible to perform in 2007, Siegel turned to visual art, soon using Adobe Photoshop to manipulate images later printed on metal plates, and culminating in a gallery show "The Art of Dick Siegel" of his "digital constructions" at the Artsearch Satellite Gallery in Ann Arbor. He taught songwriting at the University of Michigan, first for the LSA Honor's College as the Helen L. DeRoy Visiting Professor in 2010 and later as a lecturer in the University of Michigan School of Music, Theatre & Dance until 2021. Siegel is also a skilled carpenter with a parallel career in home building. Dick Siegel's sister, Elise Siegel, is an American sculptor and installation artist.

== Musical style ==
As a singer-songwriter, Siegel's music and lyrics extend from his relationships and experiences. His music likewise reflects a broad aesthetic and engagement with many influences, including folk, roots, blues, rock, jazz, and pop. The art of Woody Guthrie and Bob Dylan, particularly their political songwriting, can be clearly heard in such albums as 2002's Fighting for King George (a reference to then U.S. President George W. Bush). His protest song "My Sweet America" from the album speaks to Siegel's disillusionment with the heroic nation of World War II corrupted by greed and was published in the folk songwriting magazine Sing Out in 2004. He is known as a master of the talking blues on songs such as "What Would Brando Do?" and other primary influences include country star Hank Williams, bandleader and songwriter Louis Jordan, Van Morrison, and Spike Jones. While the author of words and melody of his songs, Siegel foregrounds the skill and stylistic strengths of the musical collaborators in his bands, a feature particularly evident in his recordings. Recorded in Ann Arbor, the album Snap! (1980) features rock and jazz stylings and the energy of a bar band, while 2002's A Little Pain Never Hurts has a country and western resonance.

== Discography ==
- SNAP!, Boo-Kay Records, 1980; reissued by Schoolkids Records, 1992 (SKR-1502-2)
- Tomorrow Morning, with Tracy Lee and the Leonards, Boo-Kay Records, 1987 (BK881); reissued by Schoolkids Records, 2007
- Angels Aweigh, Arden Records, 1994
- A Little Pain Never Hurts, Arden Records, 2002
- Fighting for King George, Arden Records, 2003
- Dick Siegel & The Brandos LIVE!, Arden Records, 2011
