= Vanaver Caravan =

The Vanaver Caravan was established in 1972 by Bill Vanaver and Livia Drapkin Vanaver. Bill and Livia met in New York City in 1971 while Bill was playing music and Livia was studying dance. They soon joined forces and traveled the world together performing and learning new music and dance forms. Their first concert as the Vanaver Caravan was in 1972 at Washington Square Church in New York City. They have now developed the Vanaver Caravan into a non-profit organization hosting performances and dance classes for a range of ages.

The Vanaver Caravan mixes cultural dance forms like Irish clog dance, African dance, modern dance, historical American dance, flamenco, capoeira, Taiko drumming, Chinese ribbon dancing and many others. Since its inception the Caravan has continued to foster a large diversity of cultural dance forms, often mixing them in unexpected combinations. This juxtaposition brings out the aspects particular to each form while also reminding the viewer of the similarities in dance and music across cultures. The Vanaver Caravan has also reconstructed American modern dance works by Ted Shawn and Ruth St. Denis through their partnership with Denishawn dancer Jane Sherman.

The Caravan has performed around the world and have appeared at various dance festivals including Jacob's Pillow Dance Festival, the Smithsonian American Folklife Festival, the Biennale de la Danse in Lyon and the Sidmouth International Festival in England. Currently the Caravan is composed of an adult ensemble and a youth ensemble called the Caravan Kids. They are based in New Paltz, New York.

The Vanavers have used their unique blend of dance and music from around the world to foster peace and social wellness. Their collaboration with the Friendship Ambassador’s Foundation brought them to the Romania and Bulgaria to work with the Balkan Peace and Reconciliation Conference. In 2002 the Caravan developed a program for 9/11 victims that used the arts to heal children and adults.
