= King Wilkie =

- King Wilkie circa 2006

Background information
- Genres: Acoustic, bluegrass, folk
- Years active: 2003–present
- Labels: Rounder Records, Zoë Records, Rebel Records, Casa Nueva
- Website: Official website

King Wilkie is an American music group formed in Charlottesville, Virginia, in 2002 by Reid Burgess and Ted Pitney. While their early sound was commonly filed under bluegrass, the group has continually defied expectations, drawing from other influences, such as folk and Americana music. They have released three albums.

== History ==
Formed in Charlottesville, VA, in 2003, bluegrass sextet King Wilkie boast the talents of Reid Burgess John McDonald, Ted Pitney, Abe Spear, Nick Reeb, and Drew Breakey. Pitney and Burgess dedicated themselves to the genre after attending a festival while at college in Ohio. After relocating to Virginia in 2001 they recruited the remaining members and began work on their 2003 debut, the live and independent True Songs, with their studio debut, Broke, following in 2004.

After releasing their 2004 debut album on Rebel Records, Broke, the group was hailed by bluegrass purists as the music's great young hope. Their second album, Low Country Suite, released in 2007 on Rounder Records was a stylistic departure produced by engineer Jim Scott, well known for his work with Rick Rubin, Tom Petty, and the Dixie Chicks.

King Wilkie has toured extensively throughout the U.S., Canada and Europe. In 2005 the band performed at the Gettysburg Bluegrass Festival. Appearances on NPR, The Grand Ole Opry, and Levon Helm's Midnight Ramble, combined with festival performances and radio airplay have fueled the band's popularity, eventually resulting in their album Low Country Suite climbing into the top 20 on the Billboard charts for Americana music.

In 2008 all members, with the exception of Burgess, left King Wilkie. Burgess attempted to keep the band going with new members and on April 28, 2009, King Wilkie released King Wilkie Presents: The Wilkie Family Singers, an expansive concept album on the newly minted Casa Nueva label which was even a bigger departure from the band's bluegrass roots. Consisting of songs written and recorded by the fictional Wilkie family, it is their most wide-ranging and ambitious project yet. The album features a core sound of rickety old-time American music, embroidered with Salvation Army brass, quirky melodies, and an almost cinematic sense of scope. It also features special guests Robyn Hitchcock, David Bromberg, Peter Rowan, Abigail Washburn and others.

=== Band name ===
The band is named after Bill Monroe's horse "King Wilkie".

== Honors, awards, and distinctions ==
- King Wilkie's 2004 debut Broke remained No. 1 on the Bluegrass album chart for several weeks.
- King Wilkie were named IBMA's Emerging Artist Of The Year in 2004.
- Made their debut on The Grand Ole Opry at the Ryman Auditorium in 2005.
- On April 14, 2006 King Wilkie appeared with Ralph Stanley at The Town Hall in New York City.
- In 2006 King Wilkie released an EP Tierra del Fuego, recorded in Nashville.
- In 2007 King Wilkie released Low Country Suite, recorded in Los Angeles.
- On June 22, 2010 a project titled Wilkie Family Singers Live was released as a digital download.
