= The Freight Hoppers =

The Freight Hoppers are an American old time string band, formed in 1992. Their repertoire includes music that was first recorded in the late 1920s and early 1930s, and spans geographically from Mississippi to West Virginia Based in the Smoky Mountains of North Carolina, The Freight Hoppers draw from rural southern music for their inspiration.

The band were featured on Garrison Keillor's nationally syndicated radio show A Prairie Home Companion on National Public Radio in 1996, winning second place in the show's Talent from Towns Under 2000 contest. They recorded two albums on Rounder Records: "Where'd you come from, Where'd you go?" (1996) and "Waiting on the Gravy Train" (1998). The Freight Hoppers reformed in 2007 after a five-year hiatus during which fiddler David Bass underwent heart transplant surgery.

The Freight Hoppers fourth album is 'Mile Marker', released in 2010. But their first album was ‘Going Down The Track With A Chicken On My Back’, released in 1995.

== Discography ==
- Going Down The Track With A Chicken On My Back (Yodel-Ay-Hee, 1995)
- The Freight Hoppers: Where'd You Come From Where'd You Go? (Rounder Records, 1996)
- The Freight Hoppers: Waiting on the Gravy Train (Rounder Records, 1998)
- Mile Marker (BTR Records, 2010)
