= Samite (musician) =

Samite is the stage name for African musician Samite Mulondo. Originally from Uganda, Samite now lives in Tully, New York. He plays the flute and kalimba, a type of thumb piano. Samite is currently married to Sandra Mulondo, who is a teacher in the Tully Central School District in Tully, New York.

Samite likes to attribute his music inspiration to both Ugandan folklore and as an expression of the life he had experienced in Uganda.

Samite grew up in a wealthy of Ugandan family. Samite's music is well-loved in Uganda, among both the regime and the commoners. With his music, Samite hopes not only to reach Ugandans, but to speak to non-native people of Uganda and draw their attention to the Ugandan culture.

Samite is also a co-founder of Musicians for World Harmony, a nonprofit organization that introduces music to African orphans. Samite co-founded the charity with his late wife, Joan. Samite also shares and educates about his experiences in Uganda and as a political refugee.

His seventh album, Embalasasa, was released in 2005 by Triloka Records.

== See also ==
- Ugandan Americans
