= Reel World String Band =

American roots band

The Reel World String Band is an all-women, Lesbian, American roots music band from Kentucky. Their first record was released in 1981.

They formed in 1977 when the University of Kentucky hosted a musical event during the International Women's Year Conference in Lexington, Kentucky. They originally joined with a few other female musicians to perform at the event. Sue Massek, one of the band members, stated, "We all enjoyed ourselves so well that we continued to gather as often as we could." They then became the Reel World String Band, one of the nation's first feminist bands.

Their main focus when writing music was to advocate for social issues, such as women's rights, coal workers' rights, and environmental concerns caused by the excessive amounts of coal mining in Appalachia. Over time, as they continued to write music, they started expanding the issues they focused on. Since they were a lesbian group, they began writing music that touched on queerness in Appalachia, as it was seen as controversial during that time. Amber Moon Productions, an all-female nonprofit organization in Lexington, Kentucky, hosted the Reel World String Band at their events throughout the 1980s.

In March 2016, George Ella Lyon, Silas House, and the Reel World String Band gathered at the University of Kentucky to celebrate the donation of the band's archives to the university and to honor the 30th anniversary of the Kentucky Foundation for Women. Reel World also performed at Lexington's Lyric Theater.

In November 2016, the Reel World String Band performed its final concert at the Lyric Theatre and Cultural Arts Center in Lexington, Kentucky. After nearly 40 years of creating music together, the concert served as a community gathering to process the election that had taken place just days before.

== Feminism and activism ==
In 1991, band members Karen Jones and Bev Futrell had a radio show, 'Wominsounds' which was broadcast through Central and Eastern Kentucky from the Eastern Kentucky University in Richmond. The two-hour show was focused on music, readings, and announcements of events for women.

The band is credited as having played music in support of the Cincinnati Urban Appalachian League, the Women's National Coal Conference, and miners striking from the Pittston Coal Company and the Harlan County Jericol Mines. The band also worked with the Highlander Research and Education Center, which was a collective to help an impoverished area in Appalachia.

== Band members ==
Bev Futrell was an original member of the band who played the mandolin, guitar, and harmonica. She was originally from Texas, but moved to Kentucky when her husband got a job at Eastern Kentucky University in 1974. Bev wrote the song "Little Omie's Done Got Smart" as a comparison to the previous songs popular in Old Time style of music where the female subject would often get murdered.

Karen Jones was an original member of the band who played violin. She was from McMinnville, Oregon. After moving to Berea College, she began contra dancing, which eventually led to her learning how to fiddle from Guy Blakeman. Her time at Berea College also led to her meeting Sharon Ruble, another member of the band.

Sharon Ruble was an original member of the band who played bass. She was originally from Eminence, Kentucky and played clarinet throughout high school. She was a music major at Berea College and learned to play the washtub bass after meeting Karen. She also learned to play guitar from Sue Massek, but still chose to play bass for the band, and she is quoted as saying, "I sort of like being in the background anyway."

Belle Jackson was an original member of the band who was credited with playing guitar.

Elsie Melrod joined the band as a pianist in 1995 after playing with them occasionally previously. She was originally from Milwaukee and played jazz piano at Temple University.

Sue Massek was an original member of the band who played banjo and guitar. She was born in Kansas and moved to Kentucky in 1976. Before moving to Kentucky, she ventured out to pursue a degree at Washburn University, and then again at Kansas State University, but her passion for singing took precedence over her studies. She looked up to several folk musicians such as Lily May Ledford, Joan Base, Judy Collins, and Blanche Coldiron. She was primarily interested in the activism that inspired their music. Massek attended the Smithsonian Folklife Festival in Washington, D.C., at which artists such as Sarah Ogan-Gunning and Utah Phillips performed. In discussing this event, she stated, "I discovered the path I could follow as an artist and activist." Shortly after this event, she attended the Appalachian South Folklife Center in Pipestem, West Virginia. It was here that she discovered her passion for Appalachian issues, which led to her move to Kentucky.

== Discography and compilations ==
- The Reel World String Band, 1981
- Long Way to Harlan, 1982
- In Good Time, 1984
- They'll Never Keep Us Down: Women's Coal Mining Songs, 1984
- Appalachian Wind, circa 1988
- whatnots, 1996
- The Coast is Clear, 2001 Mountain Song: Reflections, 2002
- Live Music, 2005
- Music of Coal Mining Songs from the Appalachian Coalfields, 2007
