= 2026 Americana Music Honors & Awards =

Americana Music Honors & Awards

- Date: September 16, 2026
- Location: Ryman Auditorium; Nashville, Tennessee
- Hosted by: The Milk Carton Kids
- Website: americanamusic.org/awards

Television/radio coverage
- Network: Circle, PBS,

The 2026 Americana Music Honors & Awards ceremony was held on Wednesday, September 16, 2026, at the Ryman Auditorium in Nashville. The marquee event for the Americana Music Association and the centerpiece of their annual AmericanaFest, artists are awarded for outstanding achievements in the music industry and the Americana genre. The ceremony is the 25th edition of the Americana Music Honors & Awards, which began in 2002. Four-time hosts The Milk Carton Kids will return to host the ceremony for the first time since 2024.

== Performers ==
The list of performers for the ceremony was revealed on September 3, 2026. All performers were backed by the All-Star Americana House Band led by Buddy Miller (guitar) and featuring Fred Eltringham (drums), Don Was (bass), Jim Hoke (pedal steel/banjo), Jerry Pentecost (percussion), Larry Campbell (fiddle/mandolin/guitar), Jen Gunderman (piano/accordion), and The McCrary Sisters (vocals).

Artist(s)	Song(s)
The Heartbreakers Chris Stapleton	"American Girl" "Breakdown" "You Wreck Me"
Boy Golden	"Suffer"
Kashus Culpepper	"Jenny"
Crowe Boys	"Made to Wander"
Flatland Cavalry	"Gone"
Ken Pomeroy	"Days Getting Darker"
I'm with Her Brandi Carlile	Tribute to Dolly Parton "Coat of Many Colors"
Mon Rovîa	"Heavy Foot"
Molly Tuttle	"Rosalee"
S.G. Goodman	"Snapping Turtle"
Robert Plant	"Satan, Your Kingdom Must Come Down" "Angel Dance"
Margo Price	"Hard Headed Woman" "Don't Let the Bastards Get You Down"
I'm with Her	"Wild and Clear and Blue"
Jesse Welles	"Nerd Reich"
Brandi Carlile	"Returning to Myself"
Langhorne Slim	"Never Break"
The Milk Carton Kids	"A Friend Like You"
Kathleen Edwards	"Save Your Soul"
Buddy Miller Dan Penn The McCrary Sisters	"Don't Look Back"
Hayes Carll Elizabeth Cook	Tribute to Todd Snider "Play a Train Song"
Mon Rovîa Cleto Cordero Ensemble	Tribute to Raul Malo "Dance the Night Away"

== Winners and nominees ==
The eligibility period for the 25th Americana Music Honors & Awards was April 1, 2025 to March 31, 2026. The nominees for the competitive awards were announced on May 21, 2026. The nominees for the Instrumentalist of the Year category were unveiled on June 23, 2026. Voting for the winners took place from July 7 to July 17.

Artist of the Year	Album of the Year
Molly Tuttle; Brandi Carlile; Charley Crockett; Margo Price; Jesse Welles	Snipe Hunter - Tyler Childers; Billionaire - Kathleen Edwards; Planting the Signs - S.G. Goodman; Cruel Joke - Ken Pomeroy; Hard Headed Woman - Margo Price
Song of the Year	Emerging Act of the Year
"Returning to Myself" - Brandi Carlile; "Snapping Turtle" - S.G. Goodman; "Wild and Clear and Blue" - Sarah Jarosz, Aoife O'Donovan, Sara Watkins; "Heavy Foot" - Grant Averill, Eric Cromartie, Cooper Holzman, Andrew Lowe; "The World's Gone Wrong" - Tom Overby, Doug Pettibone, Lucinda Williams	Ken Pomeroy; Crowe Boys; Boy Golden; Kashus Culpepper; Mon Rovîa
Duo/Group of the Year	Instrumentalist of the Year
David Rawlings & Gillian Welch; I'm with Her; Flatland Cavalry; Mumford & Sons; Turnpike Troubadours	Mandy Fer; Joshua Baylock; Ethan Jodziewicz; Libby Rodenbough; Juan Solorzano

== Honors ==
The Lifetime Achievement Award recipients were announced as Robert Plant on July 16, 2026, Dolly Parton on August 6, 2026, and Tom Petty and the Heartbreakers on November 16, 2026.

In a statement accompanying Plant's announcement, Jed Hilly, the executive director of the Americana Music Association, wrote, “Robert Plant's relationship with Americana music extends far beyond influence—it is one of genuine passion, stewardship and artistic curiosity. His willingness to immerse himself in the traditions of blues, folk, country and gospel, while continuing to push their boundaries, has expanded the audience for Americana around the world. Few artists have done more to honor the music's past while helping shape its future. We are thrilled to recognize his extraordinary contributions with the Americana Music Association's Lifetime Achievement Award.” Of Parton, whose award was announced just weeks before her death, Hilly stated, “we at the Americana Music Association have long admired Ms. Parton’s work as a singer, songwriter, entertainer and one of the greatest ambassador’s music has ever known. With all of her extraordinary accomplishments — from philanthropy to television, film and business — our desire is to honor Dolly for what has always been at the heart of her legacy: a definitive songwriter and artist whose songs have shaped generations.” Parton accepted in a video that was recorded prior to her death. The surviving members of The Heartbreakers (Mike Campbell, Benmont Tench, Stan Lynch, Ron Blair, Scott Thurston and Steve Ferrone) were revealed to be reuniting to open the ceremony, joined by Chris Stapleton.

Lifetime Achievement Award

- Dolly Parton
- Robert Plant
- Tom Petty and the Heartbreakers

== Presenters ==
- Chris Stapleton and Adria Petty - presented the Lifetime Achievement Award to Tom Petty and the Heartbreakers
- MC Taylor and Swamp Dogg - presented Instrumentalist of the Year
- Emmylou Harris - tribute to Dolly Parton, posthumously presented her with the Lifetime Achievement Award
- Sadler Vaden and Katie Pruitt - presented Emerging Act of the Year
- Buddy Miller - presented the Lifetime Achievement Award to Robert Plant
- Jed Hilly - remarks, introduced Margo Price
- Langhorne Slim and Shakey Graves - tribute to Dualtone Records, presented the Duo/Group of the Year Award, introduced Brandi Carlile
- Bernie Taupin - presented Song of the Year, introduced Kathleen Edwards
- Allison Russell and Madison Cunningham - presented Artist of the Year
- Nathaniel Rateliff - presented Album of the Year
