= 2025 Americana Music Honors & Awards =

Americana Music Honors & Awards

- Date: September 10, 2025
- Location: Ryman Auditorium; Nashville, Tennessee
- Hosted by: John C. Reilly

Highlights
- Most awards: N/A
- Most nominations: MJ Lenderman (3)
- Website: americanamusic.org/awards

Television/radio coverage
- Network: Circle, PBS,

The 2025 Americana Music Honors & Awards ceremony was held on Wednesday, September 10, 2025, at the Ryman Auditorium in Nashville. The marquee event for the Americana Music Association and the centerpiece of their annual AmericanaFest, artists are awarded for outstanding achievements in the music industry and the Americana genre. The ceremony is the 24th edition of the Americana Music Honors & Awards, which began in 2002. The show was live-streamed on the Circle and NPR YouTube channels and on the AMA's Facebook page, alongside live radio broadcasts on SiriusXM and local Tennessee stations WSM, WMOT, and WRLT. An hour-long special of highlights aired on PBS in November as part of Austin City Limits. The show was hosted by actor John C. Reilly for the first time.

== Performers ==
The list of performers for the ceremony were revealed on September 4, 2025. All performers were backed by the All-Star Americana House Band led by Buddy Miller (guitar) and featuring Fred Eltringham (drums), Don Was (bass), Jim Hoke (pedal steel/banjo), Larry Campbell (fiddle/mandolin/guitar), Jen Gunderman (piano/accordion), David Mansfield (multiple instruments), Molly Jenson (vocals), and The McCrary Sisters (vocals).

Artist(s)	Song(s)
S.G. Goodman	Tribute to Neil Young's Zuma "Don't Cry No Tears"
Medium Build	"Drug Dealer"
Noeline Hofmann	"Purple Gas"
Maggie Rose	"No One Gets Out Alive"
The McCrary Sisters	"What Good Am I?"
Maggie Antone	"Johnny Moonshine"
Jesse Welles	"War Isn't Murder"
Old 97's	"Timebomb"
I'm with Her	"Ancient Light"
John C. Reilly	"Picture in a Frame"
JD McPherson	"Sunshine Getaway"
Darrell Scott	"You'll Never Leave Harlan Alive"
Nathaniel Rateliff David Rawlings Gillian Welch	"Center of Me"
Dawes	"Time Spent in Los Angeles"
Joy Oladokun	"I'd Miss the Birds"
Joe Henry	"Keep Us in Song"
John C. Reilly Margo Price	Tribute to Willie Nelson's Red Headed Stranger "Blue Eyes Crying in the Rain"
David Rawlings Gillian Welch	"Howdy Howdy"
Emmylou Harris Daniel Lanois	Tribute to Harris' Wrecking Ball "May This Be Love"
John Fogerty	"Up Around the Bend" "Lookin' out My Back Door" "Proud Mary"

== Winners and nominees ==
The eligibility period for the 23rd Americana Music Honors & Awards is April 1, 2024 to March 31, 2025. The nominees were announced on June 10, 2025 via a livestream featuring a range of prominent members of the americana music community including Brandi Carlile, Kacey Musgraves, Molly Tuttle, S.G. Goodman, Kashus Culpepper, and Jim Lauderdale. MJ Lenderman earned the most nominations, with three. Winners were revealed live at the ceremony on September 10, 2025 at the Ryman Auditorium.

Artist of the Year	Album of the Year
Sierra Ferrell; Charley Crockett; Joy Oladokun; Billy Strings; Waxahatchee	South of Here - Nathaniel Rateliff & The Night Sweats; Lonesome Drifter - Charley Crockett; Foxes in the Snow - Jason Isbell; Manning Fireworks - MJ Lenderman; Woodland - David Rawlings and Gillian Welch
Song of the Year	Emerging Act of the Year
"Ancient Light" - Sarah Jarosz, Aoife O'Donovan, Sara Watkins; "Johnny Moonshine" - Maggie Antone, Natalie Hemby, Aaron Raitiere; "Wristwatch" - MJ Lenderman; "Sunshine Getaway" - Page Burkum, JD McPherson, Jack Torrey; "Heartless" - Nathaniel Rateliff	MJ Lenderman; Noeline Hofmann; Medium Build; Maggie Rose; Jesse Welles
Duo/Group of the Year	Instrumentalist of the Year
David Rawlings and Gillian Welch; Julien Baker & Torres; Dawes; Larkin Poe; The Mavericks	Alex Hargreaves; Fred Eltringham; Megan Jane; Kaitlyn Raitz; Seth Taylor

== Honors ==
The Lifetime Achievement honorees were announced on September 4, 2025.

=== Lifetime Achievement Award ===
- Joe Henry
- Darrell Scott
- Old 97's

=== Legacy of Americana Award ===
- The McCrary Sisters

=== Spirit of Americana/Free Speech Award ===
- Jesse Welles

== Presenters ==
- William Prince - presented Instrumentalist of the Year
- Shannon Sanders - presented Legacy of Americana Award to The McCrary Sisters
- Rosanne Cash - presented Lifetime Achievement Award to Old 97's
- Sunny Sweeney and S.G. Goodman - presented Emerging Act of Year
- Jed Hilly - remarks
- Hayes Carll - presented Lifetime Achievement Award to Darrell Scott
- John Fogerty - presented Spirt of Americana/Free Speech Award to Jesse Welles
- Valerie June and Ruston Kelly - presented Song of the Year
- Rodney Crowell and Rosanne Cash - presented Lifetime Achievement Award to Joe Henry
- Warren Zanes - introduced John C. Reilly/Margo Price, and David Rawlings/Gillian Welch
- Chuck Prophet and Tift Merritt - presented Duo/Group of the Year
- Luther Dickinson and Kelsey Waldon - presented Artist of the Year
- Brandi Carlile - presented Album of the Year
