= Natalie Haas =

American cellist

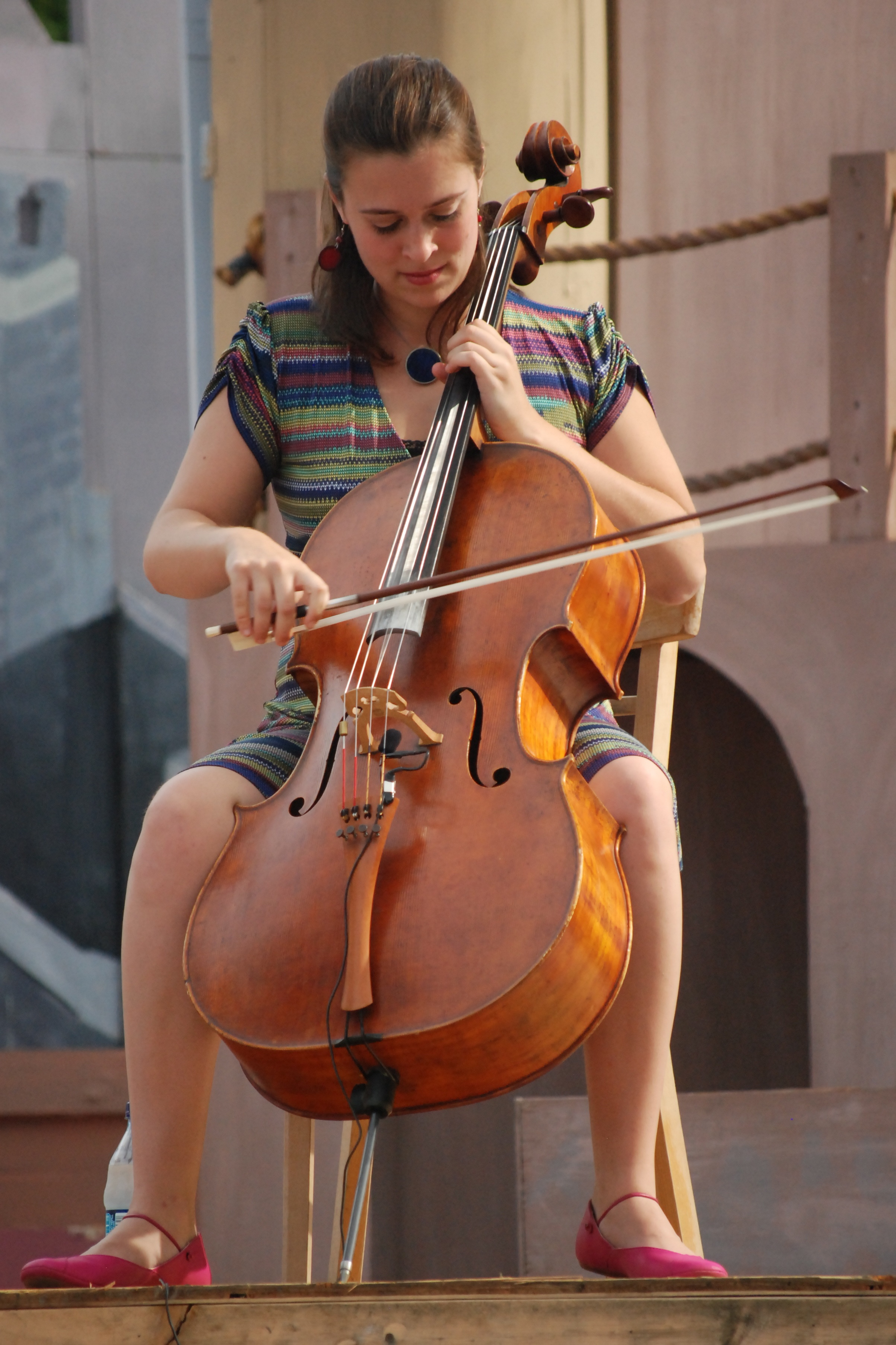

Background information
- Genres: Scottish folk, Classical
- Instrument: Cello

Natalie Haas is an American cellist, originally from Menlo Park, California. A graduate of the Juilliard School, she has toured and recorded extensively with Scottish fiddler Alasdair Fraser. She has also toured and recorded with Mark O'Connor and his Appalachia Waltz Trio, and with Natalie MacMaster. She has appeared on more than 100 albums.

Haas teaches privately and at the Berklee College of Music as an associate professor in Boston.

Haas's sister, Brittany Haas, is also a professional musician, playing fiddle in the alternative bluegrass band Crooked Still (currently on extended hiatus), with the trio Haas Kowert Tice, with the Dave Rawlings Machine, and on A Prairie Home Companion.

== Discography ==
- Northern Node 2026 with Brittany Haas, Sam Bush and Darol Anger
- Haas 2023 with Brittany Haas
- Syzygy 2021 with Alasdair Fraser
- Ports of Call 2017 with Alasdair Fraser
- Abundance 2013 with Alasdair Fraser
- Highlander's Farewell 2011 with Alasdair Fraser
- Acoustic Project 2011 with Laura Cortese, Brittany Haas and Hanneke Cassel
- In the Moment 2007 with Alasdair Fraser
- Fire & Grace 2004 with Alasdair Fraser
- Legacy of the Scottish Fiddle Vol. 2 2004 with Alasdair Fraser & Muriel Johnstone
- Crossing Bridges 2004 live with Mark O'Connor's Appalachia Waltz Trio
