= Shaken by a Low Sound =

Studio album by Crooked Still
- Released: 2006
- Recorded: 2006
- Genre: Progressive bluegrass
- Label: Signature Sounds Recording

Crooked Still chronology
Hop High (2004)	Shaken by a Low Sound (2006)	Still Crooked (2008)

Professional ratings
Review scores
Source	Rating
Allmusic	4/5 stars

Shaken by a Low Sound is the second album of progressive bluegrass group Crooked Still. With repertoire mostly consisting of traditional music, the group sounded original with the combination of Aoife O'Donovan's vocals and the unusual banjo-cello-double bass line up.

== Track list ==
1. "Can't You Hear Me Callin" (Monroe) 3:38
2. "Little Sadie" (traditional) 2:35
3. "New Railroad" (traditional) 3:15
4. "Oxford Town/Cumberland Gap" (Dylan, trad.) 2:20
5. "Lone Pilgrim" (traditional) 3:17
6. "Come On in My Kitchen" (Johnson) 4:59
7. "Ain't No Grave" (Claude Ely) 3:21
8. "Ecstasy" (Carter, Leland, O'Donovan) 6:13
9. "Mountain Jumper" (Eggleston) 2:51
10. "Railroad Bill" (traditional) 2:18
11. "Wind and Rain" (traditional) 3:46

== Personnel ==
- Aoife O'Donovan – vocals
- Gregory Liszt – banjo
- Rushad Eggleston – violoncello, vocals
- Corey DiMario – upright bass

with

- Casey Driessen – 5-string violin

== In popular culture ==
An abridged version of the song "Little Sadie" and an instrumental version of the song "Ecstasy" both appear in a trailer for The Last of Us Part II shown at E3 2018. "Ain't No Grave" can also be played on a record player by Ellie in the story, with "Ecstasy" playing afterwards. If the player stays in the room, the entire Side Two of the album will play.

The player (as Ellie) can also play the first few notes of "Ecstasy" on an acoustic guitar in one of the penultimate scenes, leading to the flashback scene previewed in the beginning of the "E3 2018" trailer mentioned above.

In the TV adaptation of the games, The band itself guest stars (along with series and game composer Gustavo Santaolalla) to perform "Little Sadie" and "Ecstasy" in the same adapted scene.
