= Hop High =

Studio album by Crooked Still
- Released: 2004
- Recorded: 2004
- Genre: Progressive bluegrass
- Label: Footprint

Crooked Still chronology
Hop High (2004)	Shaken by a Low Sound (2006)

Professional ratings
Review scores
Source	Rating
Allmusic	4/5 stars

Hop High is the debut album of progressive bluegrass group Crooked Still. Most of the songs on this album are traditional, but played in a different way than by other artists – with lineup without traditional bluegrass instruments like guitar and mandolin, consisting of cello, bass and banjo only (occasionally adding guitar and fiddle).

== Track listing ==
1. "Darling Corey" (trad.) 3:42
2. "Angeline the Baker" (trad.) 4:13
3. "Last Fair Deal Gone Down" (Robert Johnson) 4:29
4. "Orphan Girl" (Welch) 2:40
5. "Lonesome Road" (trad.) 3:18
6. "Old Virginia" (trad.) 4:04
7. "Flora" (trad.) 4:05
8. "Look On and Cry" (trad.) 3:40
9. "Lulu Gal" (trad.) 2:41
10. "Rank Stranger" (Brumley) 3:47
11. "Shady Grove" (trad.) 4:30

== Personnel ==
- Aoife O'Donovan – vocals
- Gregory Liszt – banjo
- Rushad Eggleston – violoncello, vocals
- Corey DiMario – upright bass
- Brittany Haas – 5-string violin
