= Aoife O'Donovan =

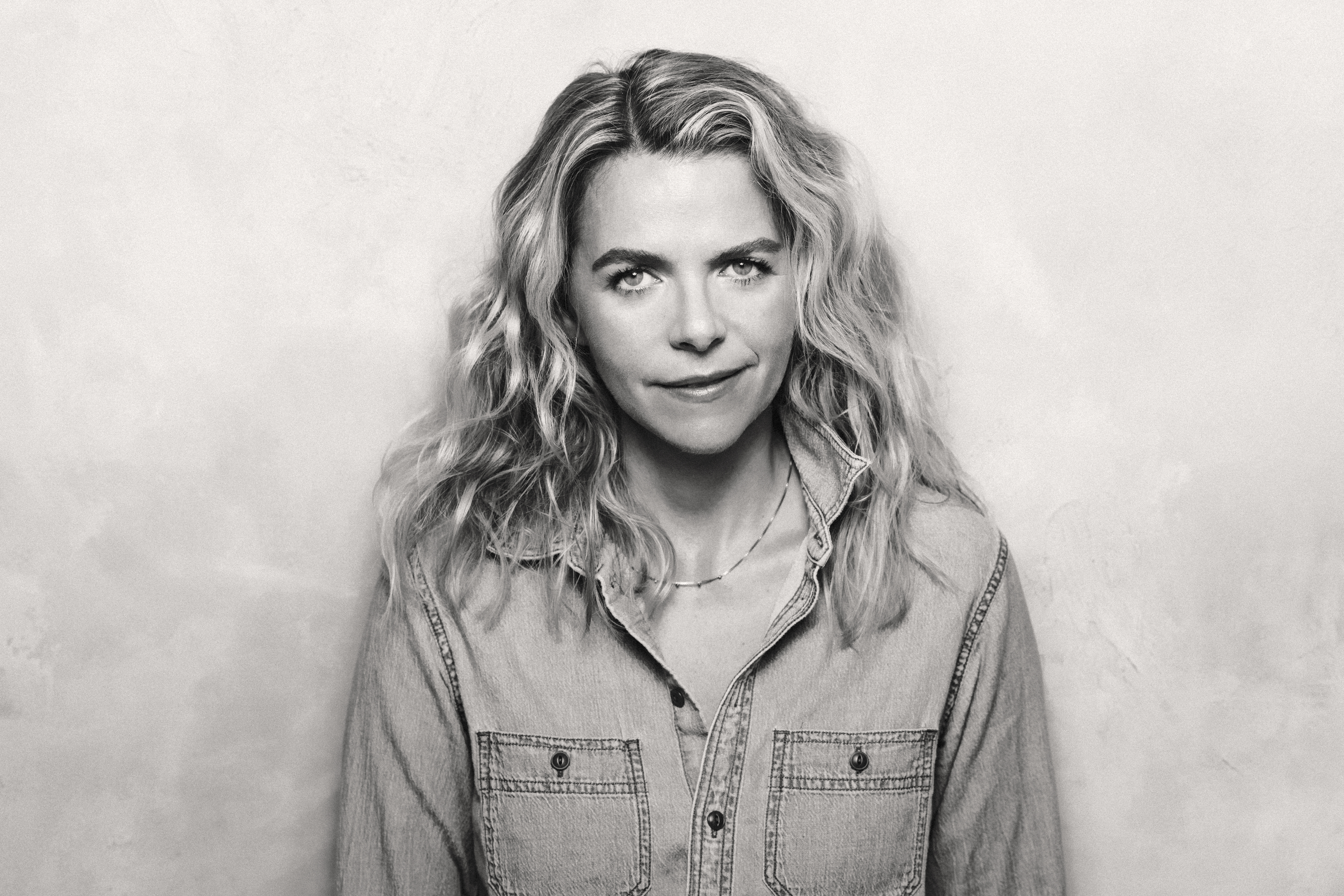
- O'Donovan in 2021

Background information
- Born: November 18, 1982 (age 43); Boston, Massachusetts
- Genres: Folk rock, Americana
- Occupation: Musician
- Instruments: Vocals, guitar, piano
- Years active: 2001–present
- Member of: I'm with Her, Crooked Still
- Formerly of: Sometymes Why, The Wayfaring Strangers
- Website: aoifeodonovan.com

Aoife Maria O'Donovan (/ˈiːfə/ EE-fə; born November 18, 1982) is an American singer and Grammy Award-winning songwriter. She is best known as the lead singer for the string band Crooked Still, as well as one-third of the supergroup folk trio I'm with Her alongside Sarah Jarosz and Sara Watkins. As a solo artist, O'Donovan has released four critically acclaimed studio albums: Fossils (2013), In the Magic Hour (2016), Age of Apathy (2022, nominated for the Best Folk Album Grammy Award), and All My Friends (2024, nominated for the Best Folk Album and Best American Roots Song Grammy Awards). She has also released multiple noteworthy live recordings and EPs, including Blue Light (2010), Peachstone (2012), Man in a Neon Coat: Live From Cambridge (2016), In the Magic Hour: Solo Sessions (2019), and Bull Frog's Croon (and Other Songs) (2020). She also spent a decade contributing to the radio variety shows Live from Here and A Prairie Home Companion. Her first professional engagement was singing lead for the folk group The Wayfaring Strangers.

O'Donovan has performed with the Boston Pops Orchestra, the Kansas City Symphony, the National Symphony Orchestra, the Louisville Orchestra, and the Utah Symphony Orchestra. In 2012, she sang on most of the tracks on the album Be Still by the jazz group the Dave Douglas Quintet, featuring trumpeter Dave Douglas. During the summer of 2013, she toured with Garrison Keillor and his A Prairie Home Companion Radio Romance Tour. She also performed at the Roskilde Festival in Denmark 2014. In summer 2017, she joined Garrison Keillor's Prairie Home "Love and Comedy" Tour.

She has performed, recorded and collaborated with a large variety of acclaimed musicians including Ollabelle, Karan Casey and Seamus Egan, Jerry Douglas, Jim Lauderdale, Darol Anger, Sarah Jarosz, Sara Watkins, Christina Courtin, Chris Thile, Noam Pikelny, Edgar Meyer, Stuart Duncan, Greensky Bluegrass, Kronos Quartet and Yo-Yo Ma. Her songwriting has also led her to be featured in films and television and came to the attention of Alison Krauss, who recorded O'Donovan's song "Lay My Burden Down" on her album Paper Airplane (2011 Rounder Records) and is used in the film Get Low (2010 Sony Pictures). She has had solo songs placed on True Blood (HBO) and Private Practice (ABC), as well as Crooked Still songs featured in The Last of Us.

O'Donovan's song "Red & White & Blue & Gold" was the sixth of twenty featured tracks on Barack Obama's official Spotify playlist, "The President's Summer Playlist: Night," published in August 2015. Her inclusion brought her music to a wider audience. She was later featured on Obama's 2025 Favorites list for the song "Ancient Light," released as part of the folk trio I'm With Her, formed with Sarah Jarosz and Sara Watkins.

== Life and career ==
=== Early and personal life ===
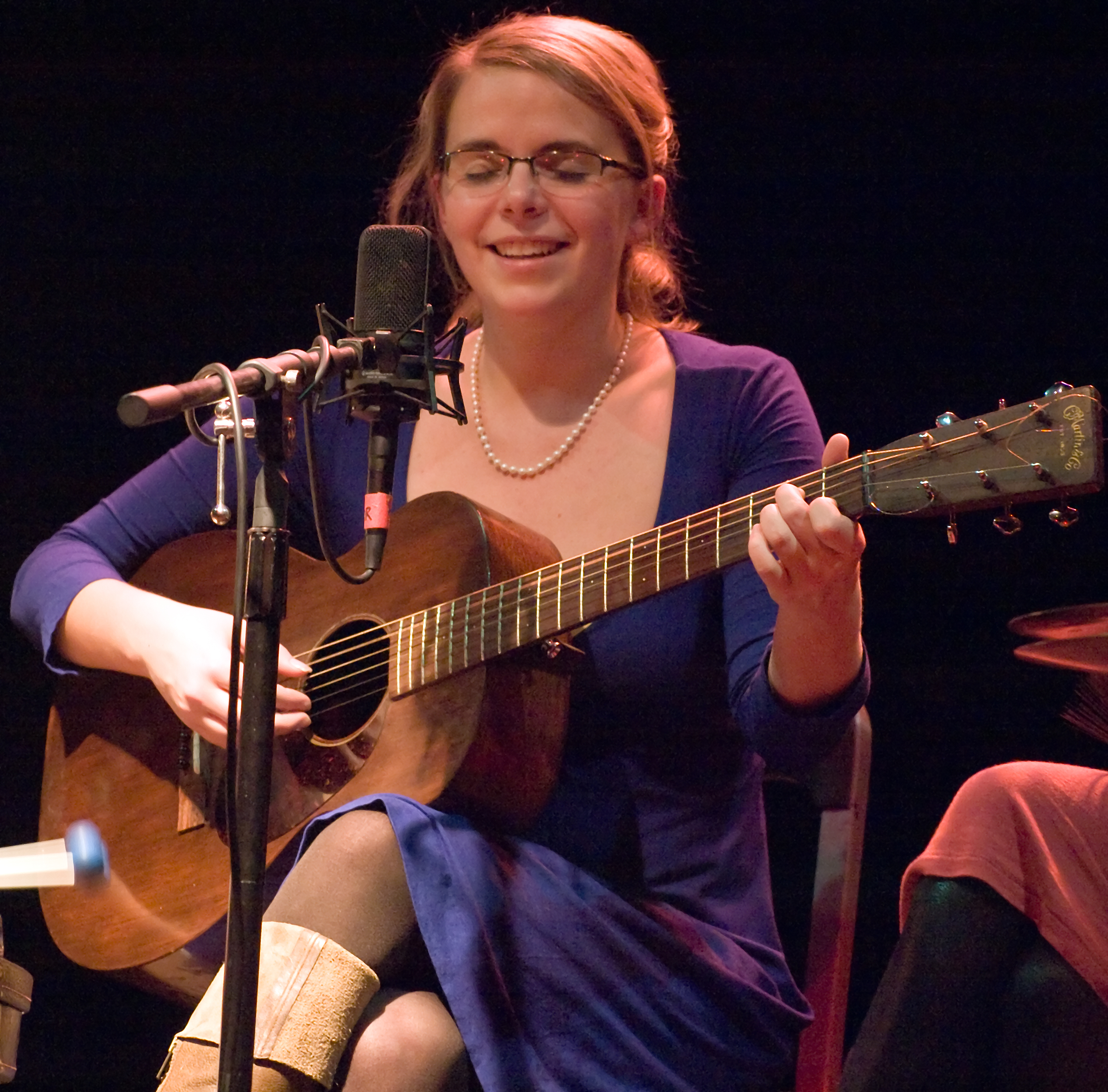
Aoife O'Donovan playing guitar at a concert in 2009

O'Donovan grew up in Newton, Massachusetts. She spent her summers in Ireland, singing songs with her extended family. She became interested in American folk music through artists such as Joan Baez and Bob Dylan. Aoife went on to study contemporary improvisation at the New England Conservatory of Music, where she graduated in 2003. In 2016, she wed Eric Jacobsen; subsequently they had a daughter Ivy Jo, born in 2017.

=== Crooked Still (2001–2011) ===
O'Donovan and bassist Corey DiMario met at the New England Conservatory of Music in Boston, Massachusetts, in the spring of 2001. Cellist Rushad Eggleston, who was studying at Berklee College of Music, and banjo player Gregory Liszt, a graduate student at MIT, were playing music together around the same time, and when the four met that summer, they formed the band Crooked Still. The group grew in popularity by playing Boston area venues. The group was invited to perform at the Newport Folk Festival and Falcon Ridge Folk Festival, the same year they released their debut album, Hop High. Crooked Still has toured in 23 states and several countries. In August 2006, the group released their second album, Shaken by a Low Sound. In November 2007, Rushad Eggleston parted ways with the band to pursue his own music. In January 2008 two new members joined the band: cellist Tristan Clarridge and fiddler Brittany Haas. The band released its first album with the new lineup Still Crooked in 2008, a live album in 2009, a studio full-length Some Strange Country in 2010 and an EP Friends of Fall in October 2011.

=== Sometymes Why (2005–2009) ===
Contemporary/neo-traditional folk noir trio Sometymes Why was formed in 2005 by O'Donovan, Kristin Andreassen and Ruth Ungar Merenda. They came together from other bands, including Uncle Earl the Jolly Bankers (Andreassen), Crooked Still, the Wild Band of Snee, the Wayfaring Strangers (O'Donovan), The Mammals and Jay Ungar & Molly Mason's Family Band (Merenda). Sometymes Why released their debut cd in 2005 titled Sometimes Why, followed by Your Heart Is A Glorious Machine in 2009.

=== I'm With Her (2014–present) ===
In 2015, Aoife toured extensively with Sara Watkins (a founding member of Nickel Creek) and Sarah Jarosz under the combined tour banner of "I'm With Her". This combo came about after an impromptu performance at the 2014 Telluride Bluegrass Festival.

The group covered John Hiatt's "Crossing Muddy Waters" in 2015, and released the single "Little Lies" in 2017, touring the US later that year. They recorded their debut album See You Around at Real World Studios in Bath, Somerset, England, three weeks after they had written it. The album was co-produced by Ethan Johns and released on February 16, 2018. American singer-songwriter Gillian Welch wrote the album's last track "Hundred Miles"; the trio is credited with writing all other songs on the album. The group toured in the U.S. and in Europe in the first half of 2018.

At the 62nd Grammy Awards on January 26, 2020, I'm With Her won the award for Best American Roots Song for their recording of "Call My Name". The song was co-written by Jarosz, Watkins, and O'Donovan.

In 2021, she was a soloist with the Naumburg Orchestral Concerts, in the Naumburg Bandshell, Central Park, in the summer series.

At the 68th Grammy Awards, I’m With Her won Best Folk Album for their 2025 album Wild and Clear and Blue. Additionally their song “Ancient Light” was awarded Best American Roots Song and nominated for Best American Roots Performance.

=== Solo career (2010–present) ===
In June 2010, O'Donovan released her first solo recording, Blue Light, in the form of a limited edition 7" vinyl.

O'Donovan is the guest vocalist on the 2013 Grammy winning The Goat Rodeo Sessions (2011 Sony Masterworks), an album recorded by cellist Yo-Yo Ma, bassist Edgar Meyer, mandolinist Chris Thile and fiddler Stuart Duncan. The album includes two vocal tracks featuring O'Donovan and Chris Thile. O'Donovan co-wrote one of those tracks, "Here And Heaven", with Meyer, Thile and Duncan.

In November 2012, Aoife signed a deal with Yep Roc Records. A single, "Red & White & Blue & Gold" was released April 2, 2013, and her full-length debut album, "Fossils", produced by Tucker Martine, was released on June 11, 2013.

Aoife has toured with the Punch Brothers, Transatlantic Sessions, the Milk Carton Kids, Elephant Revival, The Goat Rodeo Sessions and The Lone Bellow, makes frequent appearances on Chris Thile's Live From Here as well as headlining performances both in the US and abroad.

In 2016, Aoife released her sophomore solo studio album on Yep Roc Records, titled In The Magic Hour. On September 9, she also released the live album Man In A Neon Coat: Live From Cambridge, also on Yep Roc Records. In 2018, Aoife wrote and recorded an original song titled "Are You There" for Elizabeth Chomko's short-film What They Had starring Hilary Swank.

In 2020, Aoife and her band I'm with Her won a Grammy Award for Best American Roots Song for their song "Call My Name". The following month, Aoife released her string quartet EP, Bullfrog's Croon (and Other Songs). As a solo artist she was inter alia part of the Newport Folk Festival in July 2021.

On January 21, 2022, O'Donovan released Age of Apathy, a solo record produced by Joe Henry with guest performances by Allison Russell and Madison Cunningham. Later that year, it received a Grammy nomination for Best Folk Album.

In 2024, O'Donovan released All My Friends, a solo album originally commissioned for the anniversary of the 19th amendment. All My Friends features collaboration with The Westerlies, the Knights, Anaïs Mitchell, and the San Francisco Girls' Chorus. O'Donovan received a Best Folk Album nomination for All My Friends at the 67th Grammys and a nomination for Best American Roots Song for her song "All My Friends".

== Discography ==
=== Solo recordings ===
Year	Album	Record label
2010	Blue Light (EP)	Media Blitz Record Co.
2012	Peachstone (EP)	Self Released
2013 (June 11)	Fossils	Yep Roc Records
2016 (January 22)	In the Magic Hour	Yep Roc Records
2016 (September 9)	Man in a Neon Coat: Live from Cambridge (Live Album)	Yep Roc Records
2019 (November 1)	In the Magic Hour: Solo Sessions (EP)	Yep Roc Records
2020 (March 6)	Bull Frog's Croon (and Other Songs) (EP)	Yep Roc Records
2021	Aoife plays Nebraska	Yep Roc Records
2022	Age of Apathy	Yep Roc Records
2024 (March 22)	All My Friends	Yep Roc Records

=== With Sometymes Why ===
Year	Album	Record label
2005	Sometimes Why	Self Released
2007	Sometimes Why (Silver Edition)	Self Released
2009	Your Heart Is a Glorious Machine	Signature Sounds

=== With Crooked Still ===
Year	Album	Record label
2004	Hop High	Footprint Records
2006	Shaken by a Low Sound	Signature Sounds
2008	Still Crooked	Signature Sounds
2009	Crooked Still Live	Signature Sounds
2010	Some Strange Country	Signature Sounds
2011	Friends of Fall (EP)	Signature Sounds
2018	Live at Grey Fox July 16, 2006	Signature Sounds

=== With I'm With Her ===
Year	Album	Record label
2015	Crossing Muddy Waters (EP)	Sugar Hill
2018	See You Around	New Rounder
2019	"Call My Name" (Single)	Rounder
2025	Wild and Clear and Blue	Rounder

=== Videos ===
Year	Title	Producer
2010	"Half of What We Know" (with Crooked Still)	Grey Sky Films
2013	"Red & White & Blue & Gold"	Yep Roc Records
2013	"Beekeeper"	Yep Roc Records

=== As guest artist ===
Year	Artist	Title	Record label
2003	The Wayfaring Strangers	This Train	Rounder
2004	The Wild Band of Snee	Mystical 4-Track Recordings of Snee	The Wild Band of Snee
2004	The Wild Band of Snee	Rushad Eggleston and His Wild Band of Snee	The Wild Band of Snee
2005	Richie Barshay	Homework	Barshay Music
2005	The Wild Band of Snee	Music of Snee	The Wild Band of Snee
2006	The Wild Band of Snee	Playhouse of the Universe	The Wild Band of Snee
2010	The American Beauty Project	Page Auditorium, Duke University, Durham, NC 10/15/10	festivalink.net
2011	Noam Pikelny	Beat the Devil and Carry a Rail	Compass
2011	Yo-Yo Ma, Stuart Duncan, Edgar Meyer, Chris Thile	The Goat Rodeo Sessions	Sony Classical
2011	Alex Battles	Goodbye Almira	Alex Battles's Records
2012	Dave Douglas	Be Still	Greenleaf
2012	Mike + Ruthy	The NYC EP	Humble Abode
2012	Kate Rusby	20	Pure
2012	Annalivia	The Same Way Down	Annalivia
2013	Alastair Moock	Singing Our Way Through: Songs for the World's Bravest Kids	Moockshake Music
2013	Transatlantic Sessions	Transatlantic Sessions 6 - Volume Two	Whirlie
2015	John Morris Russell	American Originals	Fanfare Cincinnati
2016	Laurie Lewis and the Right Hands	The Hazel and Alice Sessions	Spruce and Maple
2016	Infamous Stringdusters	Ladies & Gentlemen	Compass
2016	Jesse Harper	One True Thing	Jesse Harper
2017	Chris Thile	Thanks for Listening	Nonesuch
2018	Caitlin Canty	Motel Bouquet	
2020	Yo-Yo Ma, Stuart Duncan, Edgar Meyer, Chris Thile	Not Our First Goat Rodeo	Sony Classical
2020	Kronos Quartet	Long Time Passing	Smithsonian Folkways
2021	The Paper Kites	"Climb on Your Tears" (Roses)	Wonderlick/ Sony
2026	Renée Fleming, with Béla Fleck	"The Fiddle and the Drum"	Thirty Tigers

== Awards and nominations ==
Grammy Awards
Year	Nominee / Work	Award	Result
2019	"Call My Name" (I'm With Her)	Best American Roots Song	Won
2019	"Call My Name" (I'm With Her)	Best American Roots Performance	Nominated
2023	"Prodigal Daughter"	Best American Roots Performance	Nominated
2023	"Prodigal Daughter"	Best American Roots Song	Nominated
2023	"Age of Apathy"	Best Folk Album	Nominated
2025	"All My Friends"	Best American Roots Song	Nominated
2025	"All My Friends"	Best Folk Album	Nominated
2026	Wild and Clear and Blue	Best Folk Album	Won
2026	"Ancient Light"	Best American Roots Performance	Nominated
2026	"Ancient Light"	Best American Roots Song	Won

Folk Alliance International
Year	Nominee / Work	Award	Result
2022	Aoife O'Donovan	Artist of The Year	Nominated
2022	"B61"	Song of The Year	Won

The American Association of Independent Music
Year	Nominee / Work	Award	Result
2023	Age of Apathy	Folk Album of the Year	Nominated
