= Ken Pomeroy (singer) =

Native American musician

Ken Pomeroy ᎤᏍᏗ ᏀᏯ ᏓᎶᏂᎨ ᎤᏍᏗᎦ
- Born: September 15, 2002 (age 24)
- Origin: Moore, Oklahoma
- Genres: Folk; Alternative country Americana
- Occupation: Singer-songwriter
- Instruments: Vocals; Acoustic guitar
- Years active: 2015–present
- Labels: Rounder Records
- Website: kenpomeroymusic.com

McKennan 'Ken' Pomeroy is a Native American folk singer-songwriter of Cherokee descent from Oklahoma.

== Early life ==
Pomeroy was raised in Moore, Oklahoma. She is a member of the Cherokee Nation.

Pomeroy took an interest in music at six years old after hearing the song "Leaving on a Jet Plane" by John Denver. She began writing songs at age eleven.

== Career ==
Pomeroy began playing music gigs at 13 years old. When she was 16 years old she opened for Wanda Jackson at the Oklahoma Rodeo Centennial Opry. After a string of EPs, she released her first official solo album, Christmas Lights in April, on December 10, 2021.

On September 20, 2023, two of Pomeroy's unreleased songs, "Pareidolia" and "Cicadas", were featured on the FX on Hulu show Reservation Dogs in the season three episode "Elora's Dad". The songs were selected by series co-creator Sterlin Harjo after he sought out local musicians to feature and was sent demos by Pomeroy.

Demand for her unreleased songs mounted after the release of the Reservation Dogs episode. Of "Cicadas", which was used over the end credits of the episode, Pomeroy had stated “All these people were trying to Shazam the song and were asking for it on Reddit, but it hadn’t been released yet — which was probably a poor move on our part." The songs were quickly released as singles within the week.

Pomeroy headlined the 27th Annual Woody Guthrie Folk Festival in Okemah, Oklahoma on July 12, 2024. Later that month, she signed to American roots music label Rounder Records.

On July 19, 2024, a cover of the Richard and Linda Thompson song "Wall of Death" by Wilderado, James McAlister, and Pomeroy was released on the soundtrack for the 2024 film Twisters. In the film, she makes a brief cameo appearance singing the song.

Her second official solo album, Cruel Joke was released on May 16, 2025. The album was met with positive reviews with reviewers noting a unique blend of American folk, Cherokee heritage, and Oklahoma Red Dirt. Tulsa-based folk-rock musician John Moreland, who she opened for on tour in early 2024, is featured on the track "Coyote".

In 2025, she appeared in her first acting role as a recurring character in Sterlin Harjo's television series The Lowdown on FX.

== Personal life ==
Pomeroy lives in Tulsa, Oklahoma.

== Discography ==
Studio albums

- 2021: Christmas Lights in April
- 2025: Cruel Joke

== Awards and nominations ==
Year	Association	Category	Nominated work	Result	Ref.
2026	Americana Music Honors & Awards	Emerging Act of the Year	Herself	Won	
2026	Americana Music Honors & Awards	Album of the Year	Cruel Joke	Nominated	
