= I Ain't Your Mama =

Single by Maggie Rose

from the album Cut to Impress
- Released: June 25, 2012
- Genre: Country
- Length: 2:58
- Label: RPM Entertainment
- Songwriters: Candy Cameron; Judson Spence
- Producer: James Stroud

Maggie Rose singles chronology
"Maybe Tonight" (2011)	"I Ain't Your Mama" (2012)	"Better" (2013)

"I Ain't Your Mama" is a song recorded by American country music artist Maggie Rose. It was released in June 2012 as the first single from her debut album, Cut to Impress. The song was written by Candy Cameron and Judson Spence.

== Critical reception ==
Billy Dukes of Taste of Country gave the song four stars out of five, calling it "the boundary-pushing song country music needs to embrace every year or two" and writing that Rose "showcases a big, commanding voice that will be overlooked in this PG-13 rated single." Matt Bjorke of Roughstock gave the song four stars out of five, saying that it has "a groovy melody, a spitfire kind of verse structure and a sassy vocal delivery that a song like this requires."

== Music video ==
The music video was directed by Tyler Evans and David Lavender from Yeah Yeah Creative. It premiered in August 2012.

== Chart performance ==
"I Ain't Your Mama" debuted at number 59 on the U.S. Billboard Hot Country Songs chart for the week of July 7, 2012.

== Charts ==
Chart (2012–2013)	Peak position
US Country Airplay (Billboard)	29
US Hot Country Songs (Billboard)	38
