= Some Strange Country =

Studio album by Crooked Still
- Released: 2010
- Recorded: 2010
- Genre: Progressive bluegrass
- Label: Signature Sounds Recording

Crooked Still chronology
Still Crooked (2006)	Some Strange Country (2010)	Friends of Fall (2011)

Professional ratings
Review scores
Source	Rating
Allmusic	3.5/5 stars

Some Strange Country is the fourth studio album by progressive bluegrass group Crooked Still.

== Track list ==
1. Sometimes in this Country (Trad. arr. Crooked Still) 4:00
2. The Golden Vanity (Trad. arr. Crooked Still) 4:16
3. Distress (Anne Steele/Trad. arr. Crooked Still) 3:05
4. Henry Lee (Trad. arr. Crooked Still) 4:05
5. Half of What we Know (Aoife Maria O'Donovan) 4:02
6. I'm Troubled (Trad. arr. Crooked Still) 2:45
7. Locust in the Willow (Brittany Haas) 3:49
8. Turning Away (Greg Liszt) 1:40
9. Calvary (Trad. arr. Crooked Still) 4:03
10. Cold Mountains (Trad. arr. Crooked Still) 3:13
11. You Were Gone (Aoife Maria O'Donovan/Brittany Haas/Tristan Clarridge) 4:23
12. You Got the Silver (Mick Jagger/Keith Richards) 3:50

== Personnel ==
- Aoife O'Donovan – vocals
- Gregory Liszt – banjo
- Tristan Clarridge – violoncello
- Corey DiMario – upright bass
- Brittany Haas – 5-string fiddle, vocals
