= Cut to Impress =

Studio album by Maggie Rose
- Released: March 26, 2013
- Recorded: 2012
- Genre: Country
- Length: 35:10
- Label: RPM Entertainment
- Producer: James Stroud; Blake Chancey; Stephony Smith

Maggie Rose chronology
Cut to Impress (2013)	Change the Whole Thing (2018)

Singles from Cut to Impress
- 1. "I Ain't Your Mama" Released: June 25, 2012; 2. "Better" Released: February 25, 2013; 3. "Looking Back Now" Released: January 20, 2014

Cut to Impress is the debut studio album by American country music artist Maggie Rose. The album was released on March 26, 2013, via RPM Entertainment. It includes the singles "I Ain't Your Mama", "Better" and "Looking Back Now".

== Content ==
Maggie Rose co-wrote four of the album's 10 tracks, including "Mostly Bad", which contains the lyric that the album was titled after. On naming the record Cut to Impress, Rose said that it was "a confident statement about all the cuts on the album, and it's also is a statement saying I have cut out a place for myself as an artist that is different and unique."

"I Ain't Your Mama" was released as the album's lead-off single on June 25, 2012. The song reached a peak of number 38 on the U.S. Billboard Hot Country Songs chart, becoming her first Top 40 hit, and also peaked at number 29 on the Billboard Country Airplay chart. "Better" was released as the second single on February 25, 2013, and was another Top 30 hit on the Country Airplay chart. The album's third and final single, "Looking Back Now", was released on January 20, 2014, and reached a peak of number 46 on the Country Airplay chart.

== Critical reception ==
Professional ratings
Review scores
Source	Rating
Allmusic	4/5 stars
Roughstock	4.5/5 stars

Daryl Addison of GAC gave Cut to Impress a positive review and said that the album "more than lives up to its name with a wholly-unique blend of bluesy, R&B flavored country that is as sexy as it is fierce." He named "I Ain't Your Mama", "I Know Better Now", "Looking Back Now", and "Better" the album's key tracks. Roughstock's Matt Bjorke found that the songs are "mostly tempo-driven with a couple of ballads mixed in", and vowed that "She has the talent, the looks, the drive and - most importantly - the songs that make her the complete package", which this allows Cut to Impress to be a "mighty impressive collection of songs." Steve Leggett of Allmusic proclaimed that Cut to Impress "does indeed impress, full of well-recorded, well-sung tracks that are poised to shine on contemporary country radio and yet cohere together in a solid sonic statement", which the albums sound is steady, and contains "forward mixed drums giving things a big sound and swampy electric guitars giving it some bite and snarl." Yet, Leggett said, "but it's Rose's singing that makes it all work, and at times she sounds like the second coming of Shania Twain", and he called "this one...fully formed and ready to go, and if Maggie Rose doesn't end up being a major contemporary country star, well, then the whole thing is rigged." Lastly, Leggett evoked that Rose "has a powerful and slightly blues-infused voice, blonde good looks, and the kind of sassy, playful, take-no-bullshit attitude that makes her performances stand out in a crowd, a kind of good girl next door who isn't a stranger to turning up the bad girl alter ego when the song demands it."

== Track listing ==
Tracklist
No.	Title	Writer(s)	Producer	Length
1.	"Preacher's Daughter"	Connie Harrington, Maggie Rose	Blake Chancey	4:34
2.	"Mostly Bad"	Rose, Jim Wes	Blake Chancey, James Stroud	2:51
3.	"Fall Madly in Love with You"	Samuel Johnson, Camaron Ochs, Douglas Showalter	Blake Chancey, James Stroud	2:33
4.	"I Know Better Now"	Lisa Carver, Rose	Blake Chancey	3:01
5.	"Put Yourself in My Blues"	Carver, Shelly Fairchild, Stephony Smith	Blake Chancey, Stephony Smith, James Stroud	3:55
6.	"Better"	Dave Berg, Deanna Bryant, Candy Cameron	Blake Chancey, Stephony Smith, James Stroud	4:03
7.	"I Ain't Your Mama"	Cameron, Judson Spence	James Stroud	2:58
8.	"Looking Back Now"	Carver	Blake Chancey, James Stroud	4:07
9.	"Hollywood"	Brandy Clark, Fairchild, Smith	Blake Chancey	3:57
10.	"Goodbye Monday"	Cade Doyle, Natalie Murphy, Rose, Sarah Tomek, Jason Waters, Raquel Wynn	Blake Chancey	3:17
Total length:				35:10

== Personnel ==
- Eddie Bayers - drums
- Mike Brignardello - bass guitar
- Cade Doyle - acoustic guitar
- Dan Dugmore - dobro, electric guitar, steel guitar
- Glen Duncan - fiddle
- Shannon Forrest - drums
- Kenny Greenberg - electric guitar
- David Grissom - electric guitar
- Tania Hancheroff - background vocals
- Aubrey Haynie - fiddle, mandolin
- Wes Hightower - background vocals
- Brent Mason - electric guitar
- Greg Morrow - drums
- Natalie Murphy - fiddle, background vocals
- Steve Nathan - keyboards, piano
- Billy Panda - acoustic guitar
- Maggie Rose - lead vocals, background vocals
- Raquel Shouse - bass guitar
- Sarah Tomek - drums, percussion
- Jason Waters - percussion, background vocals
- Biff Watson - acoustic guitar
- Raquel Wynn - background vocals

== Chart performance ==
=== Album ===
Chart (2013)	Peak position
US Billboard Top Country Albums	36
US Billboard Top Heatseekers	10

=== Singles ===
Year	Single	Peak chart positions	
Year	Single	US Country	US Country Airplay
2012	"I Ain't Your Mama"	38	29
2013	"Better"	46	30
2014	"Looking Back Now"	—	46
"—" denotes releases that did not chart
