= Dave McGraw & Mandy Fer =

American musical duo

- Origin: Northwest Washington State
- Genres: Folk rock, roots rock, Americana
- Years active: 2010–present
- Label: independent
- Members: Dave McGraw; Mandy Fer
- Website: daveandmandymusic.com

Dave McGraw & Mandy Fer are an American folk rock singer-songwriter duo based in northwest Washington State. McGraw & Fer had both been pursuing solo singer-songwriter music careers before they began their musical partnership in the summer of 2010.

During their live performances, McGraw sings and plays acoustic guitar & djembe. Fer sings and plays acoustic & electric guitars. Their music highlights intricate rhythms, close harmony, and the blending of multiple musical styles and genres (folk-rock, americana, singer-songwriter, roots rock to name a few).

ndividually and collectively, the pair has shared stages with fellow troubadours including The Swell Season, David Wilcox, Willy Porter, Peter Mulvey, Po' Girl, Tony Furtado, Gregory Alan Isakov, Jeffrey Foucault, and many others.

In summer 2018, the duo renamed their band Sway Wild.

In September 2026, Mandy Fer won the Instrumentalist of the Year award at 2026 Americana Music Honors & Awards.

== Seed of a Pine (2012) ==
The songwriters’ first official collaboration, Seed of a Pine, was self-released on February 15, 2012. Seed of a Pine itself was recorded in Chicago during the summer of 2011 with producer Zach Goheen and includes contributions from a litany of acclaimed musicians, including Wisconsin singer-songwriter Peter Mulvey, Po' Girl songstress Allison Russell, and Chicago's JT Nero (of JT and the Clouds). The album has been critically well received: "If you're a fan of modern folk and Americana, you can't go wrong with Seed of a Pine", "an album that positively brims with excellent songs, fine playing and exquisite vocals" , "a smooth and impressive slice of Americana","packed with emotive and beautiful songs which brilliantly showcases their talent".

== Maritime (2014) ==
The duo's second album, Maritime, was self-released in August 2014, funded by a Kickstarter campaign. The supposedly difficult follow-up second album is a natural progression and step-up from their debut album, and "full of soulful songs and fine musicianship". The album charted at No. 1 on the EuroAmericana Chart for two consecutive months.

== Off-Grid Lo-Fi (2016) ==
The third album, Off-Grid Lo-Fi, was self-released in 2016. As suggested by the title, the album was a low tech production and recorded entirely with solar and wind power. With sparse instrumentation, no other musicians or producer involved, and "with no computers and no editing, the aim was to capture the emotional edge rather than technical polish". The album was recorded on a remote, sparsely populated island in the San Juan archipelago, hence 'off-grid'.
