= Ann McCrary =

American singer

- Born: Beverly Ann McCrary; August 24, 1950 (age 76); Nashville, Tennessee
- Genres: Gospel, Christian R&B, Christian pop, urban contemporary gospel, traditional black gospel
- Occupations: Singer, songwriter
- Instrument: vocals
- Years active: 1988–present
- Label: Daywind

Beverly Ann McCrary (born August 24, 1950) is an American gospel musician and Christian R&B singer, who is a traditional black gospel, urban contemporary gospel, and Christian pop recording artist. She started her music career, in 1988, and released one studio album, Ann McCrary, in 2002.

== Early life ==
She was born Beverly Ann McCrary, on August 24, 1950, in Nashville, Tennessee's General Hospital, to father Reverend Samuel H. "Sam" McCrary, a founder of The Fairfield Four. McCrary was taught the song, "Since I Met Jesus", by Bessie Griffin, where this would come in handy at an impromptu concert that she got attendees to throw money at the stage, and this got herself and her father enough money to get home. Her youth and teenage music career was in the local Baptist, Catholic, and Methodist Mass Choirs. She got married in 1968, which derailed her music career, for her husband was in the military, making her a homemaker, until her psychological breakdown in Italy, during 1974. Her husband did not want her to attend church services, even threatening her with a gun, saying he was suicidal and would take his life. This left her without a church family, until their divorce in 1988.

== Music career ==
Her professional music career began in 1988, when she joined, The CBS Singers (Cousins, Brothers, Sisters), that her family members were a part of during this timeframe. This would obtain her session work with other gospel musicians, eventually leading to a recording contract. She released, Ann McCrary, on November 19, 2002, with Daywind Music Group. They would eventually start a group, The McCrary Sisters, in 2010.

== Discography ==
Studio albums

- Ann McCrary (November 19, 2002, Daywind)
