= Better (Maggie Rose song) =

Single by Maggie Rose

from the album Cut to Impress
- Released: February 25, 2013
- Genre: Country
- Length: 4:03
- Label: RPM Entertainment
- Songwriters: Dave Berg, Candy Cameron, Deanna Bryant
- Producers: James Stroud, Blake Chancey, Stephony Smith

Maggie Rose singles chronology
"I Ain't Your Mama" (2012)	"Better" (2013)	"Looking Back Now" (2014)

"Better" is a song recorded by American country music singer Maggie Rose. It was released in February 2013 as the second single from her first studio album, Cut to Impress. The song was written by Candy Cameron, Deanna Bryant and Dave Berg.

== Content ==
"Better" is a song about a heartbroken woman who has experienced a loss in her life, which leads her to consume alcohol and seek affection from others as a way to help forget her troubles, because "[she] just want[s] to feel better." Rose described it by saying that "the song tells a story of someone who resorts to things they might not be necessarily proud of, but that's how they're temporarily alleviating their guilt or their sadness."

== Critical reception ==
Billy Dukes of Taste of Country rated the single 3 stars out of 5, saying that "It’s real. A little more detail about the failed romance or some mention of what went wrong might fill in some of the spaces and allow Rose to deliver a more inspired performance. Instead, ‘Better’ is mostly a story of a woman and her drink, which can only get you so far." Matt Bjorke of Roughstock wrote in his review of the album that it "showcases Rose's soft and tender side - perhaps the most on this album."

== Music video ==
The music video for "Better" was directed by Yeah Yeah and premiered on CMT on May 30, 2013. It begins with Rose at a cemetery laying a bouquet of flowers on someone's grave, before the song starts. Rose is then shown performing the song from various places in a dimly-lit house and an empty church. At the bridge of the song, she opens the front door of the house to let the light in before appearing outside in the sun, while also being joined by people in the church. The house scenes were filmed at the estate of William Nichol who served as the mayor of Nashville from 1835 to 1837.

== Chart performance ==
Chart (2013)	Peak position
US Country Airplay (Billboard)	30
US Hot Country Songs (Billboard)	46

=== Year-end charts ===
Chart (2013)	Position
US Country Airplay (Billboard)	91
