= Still Crooked =

Studio album by Crooked Still
- Released: 2008
- Recorded: 2008
- Genre: Progressive bluegrass
- Label: Signature Sounds Recording

Crooked Still chronology
Shaken by a Low Sound (2006)	Still Crooked (2008)	Some Strange Country (2010)

Professional ratings
Review scores
Source	Rating
Allmusic	3.5/5 stars

Still Crooked is the third album by progressive bluegrass group Crooked Still. At the end of 2007 Rushad Eggleston parted ways with the group and was replaced by Tristan Clarridge, cellist of Darol Anger's Republic of Strings. Brittany Haas, 5-string fiddler of the same group, was added to the Crooked Still lineup as well.

== Track list ==
1. Undone in Sorrow (Reed) 3:05
2. The Absentee (trad.) 2:27
3. Captain, Captain (trad.) 2:42
4. Tell Her to Come Back Home (Macon, trad.) 2:57
5. Low Down and Dirty (O'Donovan) 4:07
6. Oh, Agamemnon (Haas, O'Donovan) 4:04
7. Pharaoh (trad.) 4:42
8. Florence (Carter) 3:28
9. Did You Sleep Well? (Taylor) 4:07
10. Poor Ellen Smith (trad.) 2:44
11. Theme From The Absentee (Liszt) 0:24
12. Wading Deep Waters (trad.) 4:12
13. Baby, What's Wrong With You? (Hurt) 5:10

== Personnel ==
- Aoife O'Donovan – vocals
- Gregory Liszt – banjo
- Tristan Clarridge – violoncello
- Corey DiMario – upright bass
- Brittany Haas – 5-string fiddle, vocals
