= Elora's Dad =

- Reservation Dogs episode
- Devery Jacobs (left) and Ethan Hawke (right) as Elora Danan and Rick Miller, respectively, received praise for their portrayals in the episode.
- Episode no.: Season 3 Episode 9
- Directed by: Sterlin Harjo
- Written by: Kawennáhere Devery Jacobs
- Cinematography by: Mark Schwartzbard
- Editing by: Varun Viswanath
- Production code: XRDV3009
- Original air date: September 20, 2023
- Running time: 34 minutes

Guest appearances
- Ethan Hawke as Rick Miller; Elva Guerra as Jackie

Episode chronology
← Previous "Send It"	Next → "Dig"

"Elora's Dad" is the ninth episode of the third season of the comedy and teen drama television series Reservation Dogs. It is also the series' penultimate and twenty-seventh overall episode. The episode was written by series star Kawennáhere Devery Jacobs, and directed by its showrunner and co-creator, Sterlin Harjo. In the episode, Elora (Devery Jacobs) connects with her estranged father (guest star Ethan Hawke), whom she previously believed to be dead, and his other children.

Hawke was a first choice for the role with no auditions or other possible performers contacted. The episode, described as mumblecore, was heavily inspired by the Before trilogy, a film series which also stars Hawke. Both Hawke and Jacobs received significant commendation for their portrayals. It was released on FX on Hulu on September 20, 2023, and received positive reviews from critics. Although it received no such nominations, it was considered by The Hollywood Reporter to be a frontrunner for Emmy Awards.

== Plot ==
Elora attends college for an interview. With no scholarships available, she needs financial information from her absentee father, Rick, to apply for aid. Bear, Cheese, Willie Jack, and Jackie offer to go with her, but she says she wants to do it on her own. She tracks him down and begins following him around. When he spots the tail, Rick confronts Elora with hostility. When he recognizes her as Cookie's daughter, he calms down. The two head to a local diner where Elora gets his financial information and initially remains uninterested in reconnecting. However, as they chat the two begin to bond.

Afterwards, he talks her into coming to his house so he can give her a photograph of her on her first birthday, which was the last time he saw her. Elora also spots several toys in the front yard and inside. Rick reveals that she has three half-siblings and asks if she wants to meet them. She agrees and walks with him to the bus stop as they share a joint. Elora also goes with them to have pizza. When the half-siblings ask if they will see her again, she reveals that she is attending college nearby and promises to continue seeing them. Rick and Elora hug and part ways.

== Production ==
"Elora's Dad" was written by Kawennáhere Devery Jacobs, who portrays Elora Danan Postoak in the series. She had starred in the show since its inception and joined the writers' room in the second season. She was assigned to write the episode by showrunner and co-creator Sterlin Harjo after telling him her ideas for it. It is the second episode she wrote for the series after she and Harjo co-wrote "Mabel" in the previous season. The titular role of Elora's Dad, Rick Miller, was portrayed by Ethan Hawke. No auditions were held for the role of Miller. Instead, Angelique Midthunder, the show's casting director, assembled a list of performers to possibly take on the role. This list was then presented to Harjo who picked Hawke because the two were friends and had previously expressed interest in working together. Midthunder said that no one else on the list was contacted or considered afterwards, and that hiring Hawke was "the easiest process that we've had on the show."

Jacobs described the episode as "mumblecore" and compared it to three of Hawke's previous films: Before Sunrise, Before Sunset, and Before Midnight. She specifically explained that Harjo wanted to "pay homage" to the Before trilogy, and that similar to those films, the script relies heavily on dialogue, something that is unusual for the program. Some pieces of the story were also inspired by Jacobs' personal life. Harjo later elaborated on this, saying "I love those movies because they're so simple. It's humans sort of fumbling through this relationship and trying to connect." This allowed the episode to explore numerous themes such as healing, reconnection, generational trauma, connection, and family and community dynamics. Hawke's character was named after Richard Linklater, the director of the Before trilogy.

The episode was directed by Harjo. In a scene where Elora and Rick smoke marijuana, CBD, which lacks THC, was used instead as a substitute. Featured music from the episode included "Social Skills" by John Fullbright and "Words Come Easy" by the Glaser Brothers. Harjo was seeking additional music to include and also contacted local Ken Pomeroy, an Oklahoma-based musician from Moore. Pomeroy sent Harjo three unfinished demos and he decided to include two of the three songs: "Pareidolia" and "Cicadas". Pomeroy rushed to complete production on the tracks within two weeks to meet the deadline.

== Release and reception ==
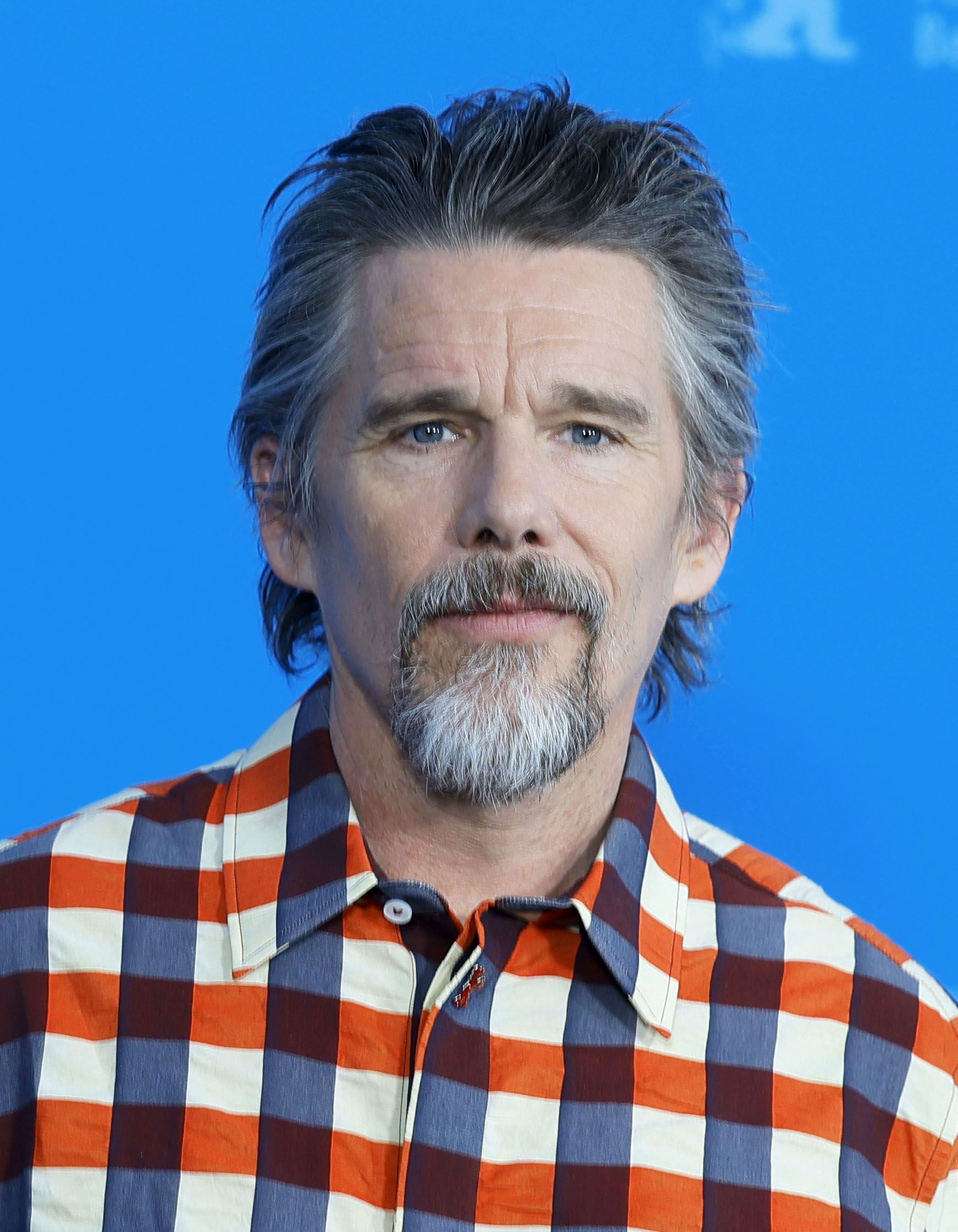
Ethan Hawke received acclaim for his role in the episode.

The episode was first released on Hulu on September 20, 2023, under their FX on Hulu content hub. Alec Bojalad from Den of Geek said that "'Elora's Dad' is a riveting experience for what is basically a conversation between two people in three different settings." Bojalad later praised the episode's dialogue, calling it "achingly, breathtakingly real" because it's "profound, yet mundane." Manuel Betancourt penned a review for the A.V. Club, in which he wrote that it was "a beautiful two-hander of an episode that brims with complex emotions and careful characterization." Rolling Stone critic Alan Sepinwall commended Jacobs' writing, stating that the script "so smart about digging into this secret history of Elora's childhood without assigning too much or too little blame anywhere."

The Oklahoman's Brandy McDonnell praised Hawke's performance, saying he "brings an honesty and vulnerability to the role of the regretful dad, providing the perfect foil for Elora's usual prickly toughness." Reviewing the episode for Vulture, Kali Simmons also applauded Hawke's acting, as well as Jacobs', explaining how developed their relationship becomes within the singular episode and noting comparisons to the Before trilogy. Jacobs and Hawke were named as TVLine's "Performers of the Week" for their role in the episode. Daniel Fienberg with The Hollywood Reporter opined that the episode should have been nominated in several categories at the 2024 Emmy Awards, specifically in areas for Hawke's role, Jacobs' writing, and Harjo's directing. Paste Magazine ranked "Elora's Dad" the fifth best overall episode of Reservation Dogs while The Oklahoman ranked Elora meeting her dad as the series' eighth best moment.
