= Little Sadie =

American folk ballad

"Little Sadie" (Roud 780) is a 20th-century American traditional folk ballad. It is also known variously as "Bad Lee Brown", "Cocaine Blues", "Transfusion Blues", "East St. Louis Blues", "Late One Night", "Penitentiary Blues" and other titles. It tells the story of a man who is apprehended after shooting a woman, in some versions his wife or girlfriend. He is then sentenced by a judge. It is most commonly sung to a tune in Dorian mode.

== Earliest transcription ==
The earliest written record of the song dates from 1922. This lyric fragment, transcribed in Joplin, Missouri, is noted in the 1948 book Ozark Folksongs, Vol. II, under the title "Bad Lee Brown":

Last night I was a-makin' my rounds,

Met my old woman an' I blowed her down,
I went on home to go to bed,
Put my old cannon right under my head.

Jury says murder in the first degree,
I says oh Lord, have mercy on me!
Old Judge White picks up his pen,

Says you'll never kill no woman ag'in.

== Musical variations ==
The first sound recording recording, by Clarence Ashley, was published in 1930, he played the song in "mountain modal" or "sawmill tuning".

The most common version in country and rock is attributed to T. J. 'Red' Arnall's 1947 Western Swing recording with W. A. Nichol's Western Aces. This version was covered by Johnny Cash, Grateful Dead, Crooked Still, Doc Watson, and George Thorogood, among others. The 1970 Bob Dylan versions are taken from either of Clarence Ashley's recordings.

Some versions refer to the Sheriff of Thomasville, North Carolina apprehending the murderer "down in" Jericho, South Carolina (a large rice plantation in the lowlands). Other versions transpose Mexico (or Juarez, Mexico) for Jericho.

"Little Sadie" may have been an influence on the 1960s song "Hey Joe".

== Selected list of recorded versions ==
- 1929 "Bad Lee Brown" [unissued] - John Dilleshaw & The String Marvel (OKeh 402406-B)
- 1929 "Little Sadie" - Clarence Ashley (Columbia 15522-D)
- 1939 "Bad Man Ballad" - Willie Rayford, recorded at Cummins State Farm, near Varner, Arkansas by John Lomax and Ruby Lomax
- 1946-1948 "Whisky Blues" - Slim Dusty - Regal Zonophone Collection - Slim Dusty (8142472) very rare. Exact date is not known.
- 1948 "Cocaine Blues" - Roy Hogsed, US Country No. 15. Music/lyrics attributed to T. J. 'Red' Arnall
- 1940s "Chain Gang Blues" - Riley Puckett
- 1940s "Bad Lee Brown" - Woody Guthrie and Cisco Houston
- 1959 "Badman Ballad" - Cisco Houston The Cisco Special! album
- 1960 "Transfusion Blues" - Johnny Cash Now, There Was A Song album
- 1960 "Bad Man's Blunder" - The Kingston Trio String Along album
- 1960 "Whiskey Blues" - Slim Dusty Songs for Rolling Stones album
- 1968 "Cocaine Blues" - Johnny Cash At Folsom Prison album
- 1970 "Little Sadie" - Trees
- 1970 "In Search of Little Sadie and Little Sadie" - Bob Dylan Self Portrait album
- 1970 "Little Sadie" - Doc Watson Doc Watson on Stage (Vanguard VSD 9/10)
- 1972 "Little Sadie" - John Renbourn Faro Annie (Reprise MS2082)
- 1974 "Little Sadie" - Uncle Walt's Band Blame It on the Bossanova album
- 1978 "Cocaine Blues" - George Thorogood & The Destroyers
- 1979 "Little Sadie" - Tony Rice Unit, Manzanita album
- 1990 "Little Sadie" - Daniel Lanois, b-side Under A Stormy Sky single
- 1993 "Little Sadie" - Jerry Garcia, David Grisman and Tony Rice, The Pizza Tapes album
- 1996 "Little Sadie" - Freight Hoppers Where'd You Come From, Where'd You Go? album
- 1998 "Little Sadie" - The Sadies Precious Moments album
- 1999 "Little Sadie" - Mark Lanegan I'll Take Care of You album
- 2000 "Little Sadie" - Norman Blake O Brother, Where Art Thou? Album Deluxe Edition
- 2001 "Little Sadie" - Old Crow Medicine Show - The Troubles Up and Down the Road EP
- 2004 "Little Sadie" - The Radiators - Earth vs. The Radiators: the First 25 Live DVD
- 2005 "Little Sadie" - John Doyle - "Wayward Son"
- 2005 "Little Sadie" - Sankofa Strings (Dom Flemons, Rhiannon Giddens, Súle Greg Wilson], "Colored Aristocracy" CD
- 2006 "Little Sadie" - Crooked Still - Shaken by A Low Sound album; featured in The Last of Us Part II trailer presented at E3 2018, and also in the final game.
- 2006 "Little Sadie" - Greg Graffin - Cold as the Clay album.
- 2011 "Little Sadie" / "White-Wheeled Limousine" / "Just One More" - Bruce Hornsby and the Noisemakers "Bride of the Noisemakers" album
- 2013 "Little Sadie" - Tim Timebomb
- 2016 "Little Sadie" - Jed Grimes and Rob File "Casa Negra Sessions Vol 1" EP

== Other sources ==
- Roud Folk Song Index 780
- Laws Ballad Index I8
- The Traditional Ballad Index LI08
- Lyle Lofgren "Remembering The Old Songs: Little Sadie" Inside Bluegrass, January 2002
- Little Sadie by The Rosinators - lyrics, song history and tab links
- Miller Jr., E. John; & Michael Cromie Folk Guitar, Quadrangle, (1968), p109
- Sing Out! Reprints, Sing Out, (196?), 9, p35
- Bailey, Hobart. Rosenbaum, Art Old-Time Mountain Banjo, Oak, (1968), p56
