= Maggie Rose =

American singer

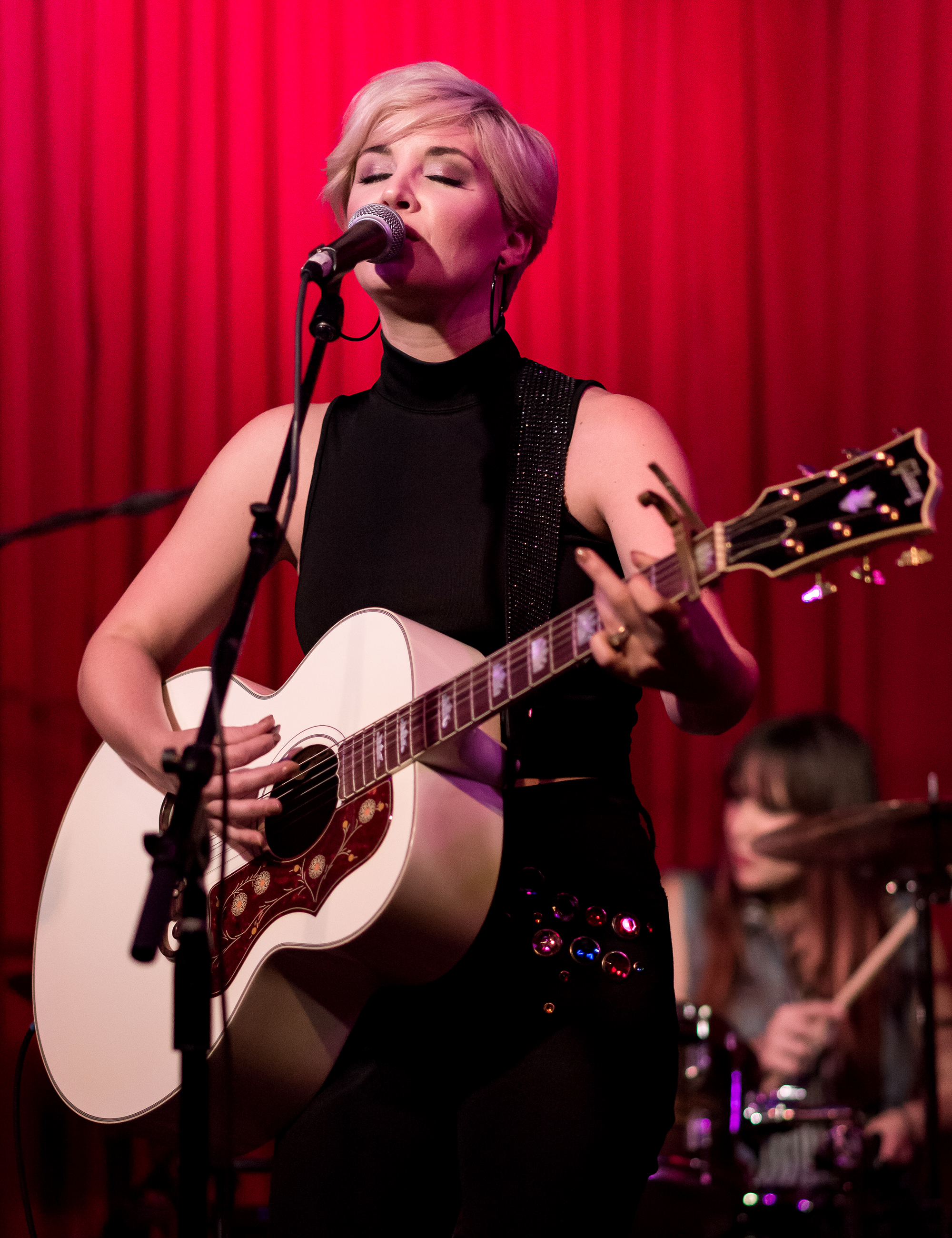
- Rose performing in 2017

Background information
- Born: Margaret Rose Durante; May 19, 1988 (age 38); Potomac, Maryland, U.S.
- Genres: Southern soul; country
- Occupations: Singer; songwriter
- Years active: 2009–present
- Labels: One Riot Records; Big Loud; Starstruck; RPM; Stroudavarious; Emrose; Universal Republic
- Website: www.maggierosemusic.com

Margaret Rose Durante (born May 19, 1988) is an American soul and country music singer. In 2009, Durante signed to Universal Republic and released a cover of Kings of Leon's "Use Somebody". A year later, she left Universal Republic and signed to independent Emrose Records, an imprint that used the services of James Stroud's Stroudavarious Records. She charted two singles for Emrose and released her digital EP, Maybe Tonight. Maggie also recorded two songs that were featured in episodes of the Disney Channel's Shake It Up and Good Luck Charlie television series, and were included on the Shake It Up: Break It Down soundtrack album that was released on July 12, 2011.

Durante changed her recording name to Maggie Rose in 2012 after signing with Scott Siman's RPM Management. When Siman expanded RPM to include a mainstream country label, he launched the album with her as the flagship artist with the first single being "I Ain't Your Mama". In 2017, Rose signed to Starstruck Records, where she released her 2018 album Change the Whole Thing. In 2024, Rose released her fourth studio album, No One Gets Out Alive. The album was well received and was nominated for a Grammy Award for Best Americana Album at the 2025 Grammy Awards.

== Career ==
Maggie Rose Durante was born in Potomac, Maryland, and graduated from Georgetown Visitation Preparatory School. She has been a lifelong singer but began performing at age 16 frequently with The B Street Band, a Bruce Springsteen tribute band. She attended Clemson University but moved to Nashville during her sophomore year in order to pursue a career in music upon receiving encouragement from producer Tommy Mottola, industry mogul and former head of Sony Music Entertainment (SME).

In 2009, Durante signed with Universal Republic out of New York and released a well-received cover of Kings of Leon's "Use Somebody". A year later, she signed to R&J Records where her first release "Mississippi's Crying", entered the Hot Country Songs charts in December 2010 and in June 2011, her music video "Maybe Tonight" debuted on Great American Country's Top 20 Country Countdown at No. 1, a first for an independent artist.

She changed her stage name to Maggie Rose, signed with RPM Entertainment and released her first LP. Her debut album, Cut to Impress, features ten tracks highlighting Rose's vocals. The album was named by Jon Caramanica as one of country music's best releases with the lead single "I Ain't Your Mama" which was hailed as a boundary-pushing song showcasing her big, commanding voice with a groovy melody and a spitfire kind of verse structure with a sassy delivery. Her second single, "Better" was released as a follow up. "I Ain't Your Mama" and "Better" were Top 30 singles on Billboard Country Airplay chart. Cut to Impress was hailed as one of the best listens of the year and began a new chapter in Maggie's career. After visiting the U.S. Troops in the Middle East in 2013, Maggie Rose joined Gary Allan and Sheryl Crow on The Free and Easy Tour. Maggie closed out 2013 having performed in 49 states over the course of 150 shows.

In response to Tomato-gate, sparked by the controversial remarks made by radio promoter Keith Hill urging radio programmers to play less female artists while comparing females to tomatoes on a salad, Maggie Rose responded by utilizing social media to launch what she called "Tomato Tuesdays". She released a new song weekly to her SoundCloud, using the social hashtag #TomatoTuesday, marking her support of females in country music. "I Want Him Bad" was hailed by critics as a standout for its astute songwriting and for combining hip-hop, 80s rock and rootsy, songwriter based sounds. Maggie Rose was dubbed by PopDust in the next class of superstar women.

Her next EP, Variety Show released in 2016, mixes country with more progressive pop and pop rock sounds. The breakout single, "Love Me More", was deemed by Rolling Stone as a genre-busting tune highlighting Maggie Rose's confidence and vulnerability with passionate vocals, soulful honesty and great songwriting mixed with the pop-leaning production. The single landed on Sirius XM's The Highway and the video debuted exclusively on CMT where it was called a little bit pop, a little bit country, a little bit soulful, and 100 percent "Maggie".

Later in 2016, Maggie Rose was featured on a Dallas Davidson track with Outkast's Big Boi and hip-hop producer Mannie Fresh called "Laid Back" a carefree portrayal of downtime which was hailed as a "wonderfully unusual" mashup. Maggie married Austin Marshall on June 4, 2016, at her home church Our Lady of Mercy in Potomac, Maryland. In August 2016, Maggie Rose signed to Narvel Blackstock's Starstruck Management and joined the roster at Creative Artists Agency (CAA).

Maggie released the EP Dreams > Dollars on May 19, 2017 as a personal expression of love and loss. The lead-off single "Body On Fire" dominated streaming platforms, landing Maggie on Spotify's Viral 50 chart upon its premiere. The track debuted on Spotify's New Music Friday the week of May 5, 2017 with immediate adds to the platform's Weekly Buzz and Wild Country playlist. In addition, the song has been featured on SiriusXM's "On the Horizon", Pandora's New Country playlist and Apple Music's Breaking Country and Hot Tracks. The title track, "More Dreams Than Dollars" speaks to her experiences as an independent, self-founded musician trying to make it in Nashville. NPR hailed Maggie Rose as "what's next in Nashville" and The Washington Post labeled her as "one of music's rising storytellers".

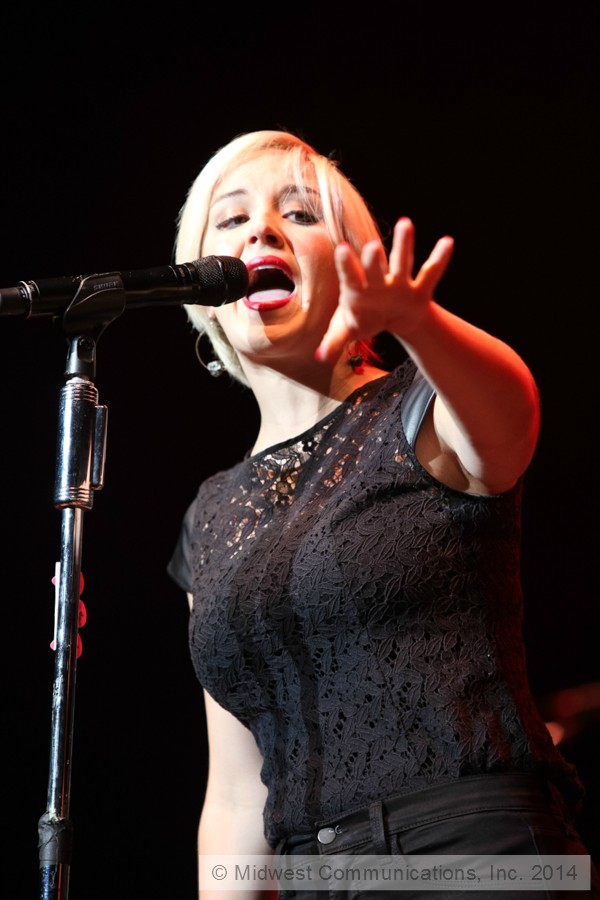
Rose performing at the Resch Centre in 2013

In July 2017, Maggie Rose entered Starstruck Studios with her 13-piece band consisting of touring band members who have worked with Brothers Osborne, Kelly Clarkson and Steven Tyler and recorded a live album in one take without overdubs or vocal tuning. She began releasing digital 45s starting in October 2017, with the smoldering "Pull You Through" and the soulful ballad "Just Getting By". "Pull You Through" landed on Sirius XM radio's "The Highway Top 10". The digital 45 schedule continued with the March release of "It's You", a throwback soul ballad that contained elements of modern pop and R&B, reminiscent of Aretha Franklin. The third digital 45 released in May included "Hey Blondie", inspired by an interview with Debbie Harry showcasing a funk inspired rhythm section and rock and roll sound.

Maggie Rose performed at the Bonnaroo Music Festival and the Chevy Breakout Stage at the 2018 CMA Fest and was highlighted by Rolling Stone in the categories of "Best of CMA Fest" and "Best Hippie Soul" performance. She performed at Spotify's CMA Headquarters for the opening of Blake Shelton's Ole Red during CMA Week. 2018 CMT Awards landed Maggie Rose on several Best Dressed lists including E!

Her performance at 2018 Bonnaroo Art and Music Festival was a deemed a "can't miss" and was considered one of the highlights at the 2018 music festival. She followed up Bonnaroo by an appearance at the Cannes Lions International Festival of Creativity in France and signing the first-ever joint venture publishing agreement between pop music's Prescription Songs and Nashville-based SeaGayle Music.

Land O'Lakes partnered with Maggie Rose and Grammy-winning songwriter Liz Rose to rewrite "Old MacDonald Had a Farm" for a national ad campaign highlighting female farmers. The ad campaign launched on Women's Equality Day, August 26, 2018.

In September 2018, Maggie Rose released the LP, Change The Whole Thing with headlining tour dates in Hollywood, Dallas, Atlanta, and Nashville. Rolling Stone included the album as a "Must Have" alongside albums by Prince and Macy Gray and stated it "positions Rose as a gifted and versatile pop-soul belter" in the vein of Bonnie Raitt and Joe Cocker's Mad Dogs and Englishmen.

In September 2018, she made her 50th Grand Ole Opry appearance with Jeannie Seely making the introduction.

In 2021, Rose released Have a Seat, a departure from her country sound to the soul/R&B genre.

In 2023, Rose signed with Big Loud. Her first studio album with the label (fourth overall), No One Gets Out Alive, was released on April 5, 2024.

On August 14, 2026, Rose released Half Moon with One Riot Records.

== Discography ==
=== Albums ===
Title	Details	Peak chart positions	
Title	Details	US Country	US Heat
Cut to Impress	Release date: March 26, 2013; Label: RPM Entertainment; Formats: CD, download	36	10
Change the Whole Thing	Release date: September 21, 2018; Label: Starstruck; Formats: CD, download	—	—
Have a Seat	Release date: August 20, 2021; Label: Starstruck Records; Formats: CD, download, streaming	—	—
No One Gets Out Alive	Release date: April 5, 2024; Label: Big Loud; Formats: CD, download, streaming	—	—
Half Moon	Release date: August 14, 2026; Label: One Riot Records; Formats: Vinyl, CD, download, streaming	—	—

=== Extended plays ===
Title	Details
Maybe Tonight (as Margaret Durante)	Release date: April 19, 2011; Label: Emrose/Stroudavarious Records; Formats: Music download
The Variety Show – Vol. 1	Release date: April 8, 2016; Label: Play It Again Records; Formats: Music download
Dreams > Dollars	Release date: May 19, 2017; Label: Maggie Rose; Formats: Music download

=== Singles ===
Year	Single	Peak chart positions		Album
Year	Single	US Country	US Country Airplay	Album
Margaret Durante
2010	"Use Somebody"	—	—	—N/a
2010	"Mississippi's Crying"	57	—	—N/a
2011	"Maybe Tonight"	60	—	Maybe Tonight
Maggie Rose
2012	"I Ain't Your Mama"	38	29	Cut to Impress
2013	"Better"	46	30	Cut to Impress
2014	"Looking Back Now"	—	46	Cut to Impress
2014	"Girl in Your Truck Song"	—	58	—N/a
2016	"Same Sky"	—	—	The Variety Show – Vol. 1
2016	"Love Me More"	—	—	The Variety Show – Vol. 1
2017	"Body on Fire"	—	—	Dreams > Dollars
2024	"Underestimate Me"	—	—	No One Gets Out Alive
2024	"Fake Flowers"	—	—	No One Gets Out Alive
2024	"No One Gets Out Alive"	—	—	No One Gets Out Alive
"—" denotes releases that did not chart

=== Album appearances (as Margaret Durante) ===
Year	Song	Album
2011	"Breakout"	Shake It Up: Break It Down
2011	"Watch Me"	Shake It Up: Break It Down

=== Music videos ===
Year	Title	Director
2010	"Use Somebody"	Brian Lazarro
2011	"Mississippi's Crying"	Ben Charles
2011	"Maybe Tonight"	Kristin Barlowe
2012	"I Ain't Your Mama"	Evans/Lavender
2013	"Better"	Yeah Yeah
2014	"Looking Back Now"	Kristin Barlowe
2015	"Broken"	Chase Lauer
2016	"Same Sky"	Justin Clough
2016	"Love Me More"	Dusty Barker
2017	"Body on Fire"	Justin Clough
2019	"I'm Yours"	

== Awards and nominations ==
Year	Association	Award	Nominated work	Result	Ref.
2025	Grammy Awards	Best Americana Album	No One Gets Out Alive	Nominated	
2025	Americana Music Association	Emerging Act of the Year	Herself	Nominated	
2026	Grammy Awards	Best Americana Performance	"Poison In My Well" (with Grace Potter)	Nominated	
