= Crooked Still =

American band

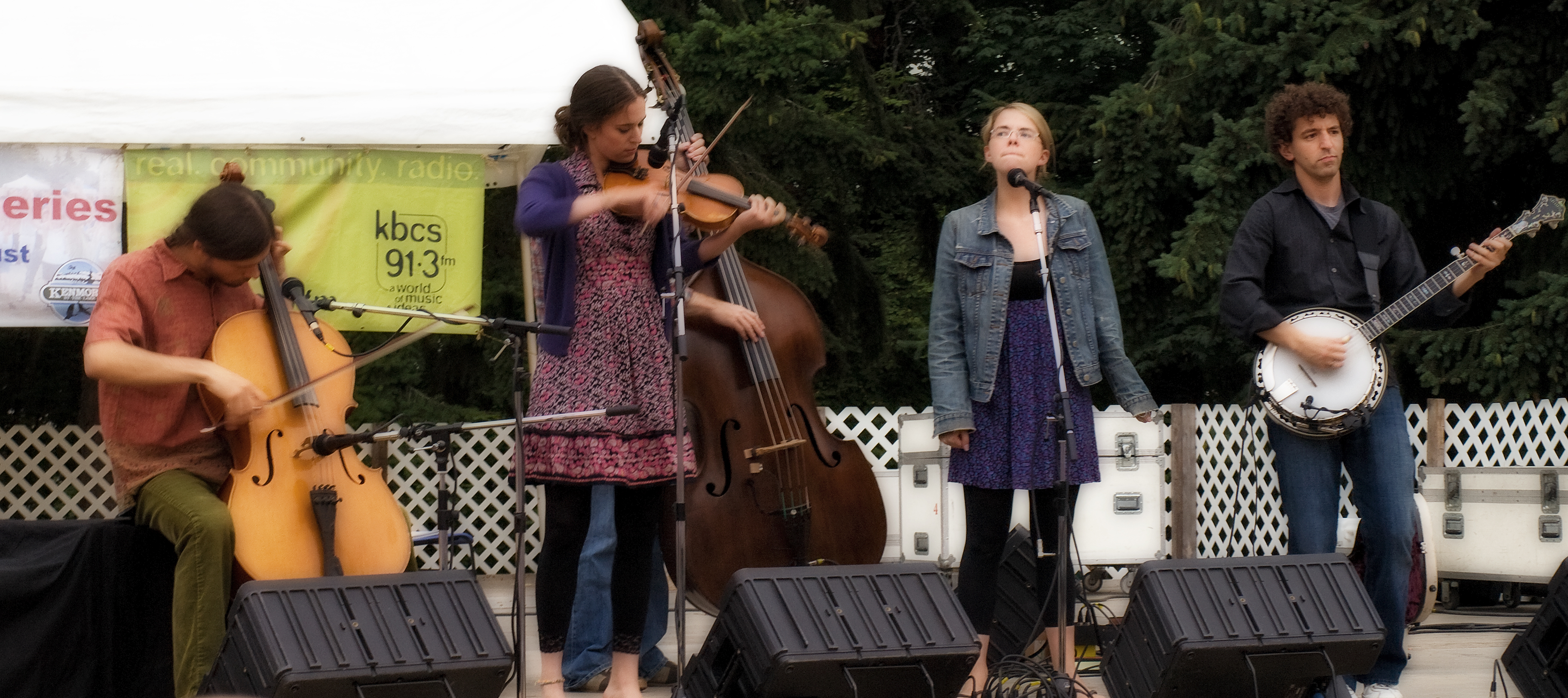
- Crooked Still performing at the Kenmore Summer Concert Series in 2009

Background information
- Origin: Boston, Massachusetts
- Genres: Progressive bluegrass; country folk; Americana
- Years active: 2001–2011, 2014–2015, 2019, 2021–present
- Labels: Footprint, Signature Sounds
- Spinoffs: I'm with Her, Wild Band of Snee, Darol Anger's Republic of Strings, Fiddlers 4, Tornado Rider, Sometymes Why
- Members: Aoife O'Donovan; Corey DiMario; Gregory Liszt; Tristan Clarridge; Brittany Haas
- Past members: Rushad Eggleston
- Website: crookedstill.com

Crooked Still is an American band consisting of vocalist Aoife O'Donovan, banjo player Gregory Liszt, bassist Corey DiMario, cellist Tristan Clarridge and fiddle player Brittany Haas. They are known for their high energy, technical skill, unusual instrumentation, and innovative acoustic style.

The string band's style has been described as progressive bluegrass, folk-country, and Americana. O'Donovan states that the band is playing its "own sort of continuation" on the bluegrass tradition that began in the U.S. with Bill Monroe and Jimmy Martin.

== History ==
=== 2001–2008 ===
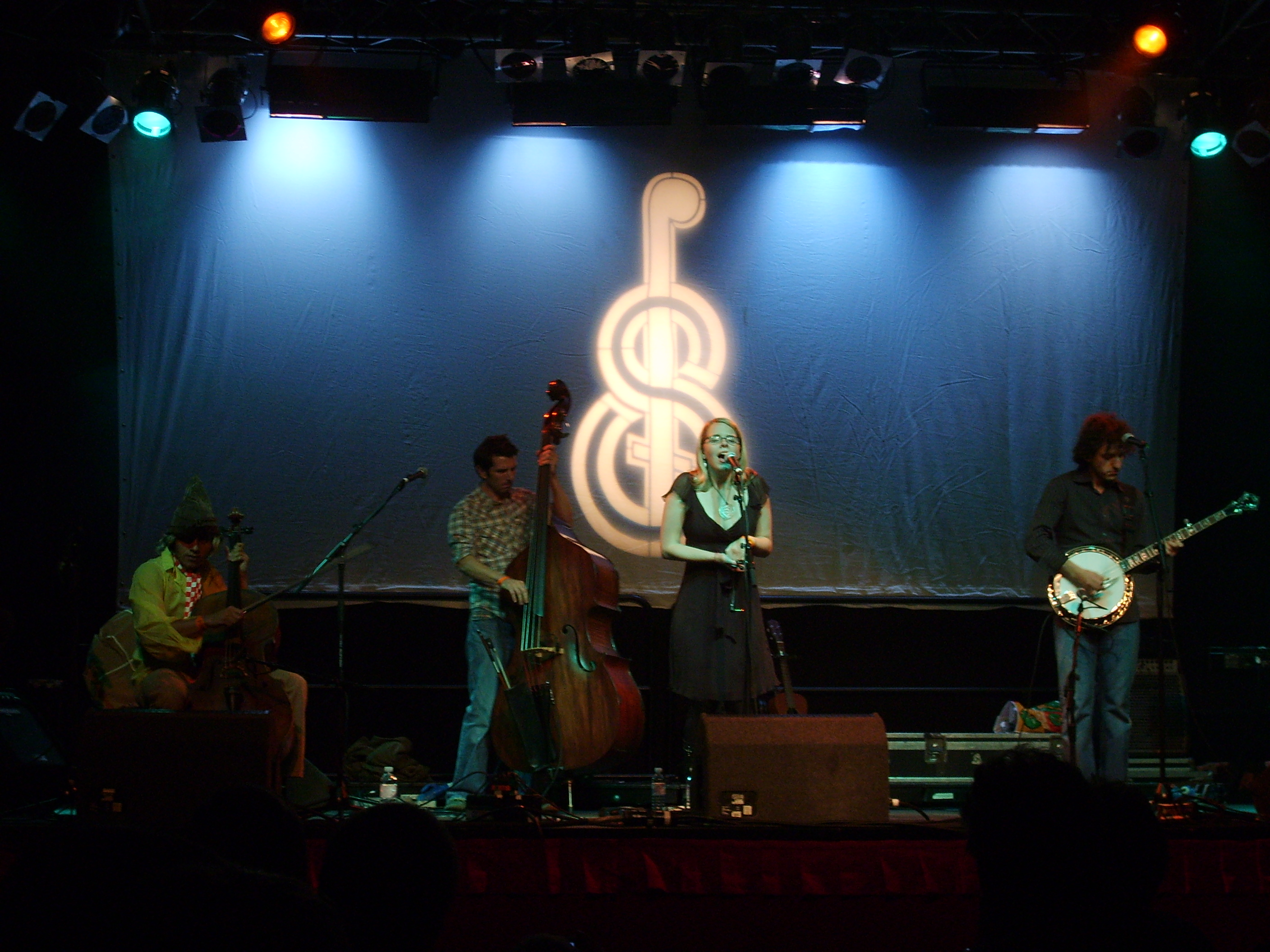
Crooked Still performing at the Shetland Folk Festival, 2007

O'Donovan and DiMario met at the New England Conservatory of Music in Boston, Massachusetts in the spring of 2001. Former member Rushad Eggleston, who was studying cello at Berklee College of Music, and Liszt, a graduate student at MIT, were playing music together around the same time, and when the four met that summer, they formed a band that became Crooked Still. While its members finished school, the group played various Boston venues, growing in popularity and collecting favorable reviews from the local press.

Crooked Still went on to appear at concert halls, festivals, coffeehouses, and nightclubs in 23 states and several countries. On August 22, 2006, the group released their second album, Shaken by a Low Sound.

=== From 2008 ===
Cellist Rushad Eggleston performed his last show with the band on November 18, 2007, at the Iron Horse in Northampton, Massachusetts. He parted ways with Crooked Still to pursue his own music with band Tornado Rider. In January 2008 two new members joined the band: cellist Tristan Clarridge and fiddler Brittany Haas, both of whom have toured in Darol Anger's Republic of Strings. The Darol Anger connection goes further: Rushad Eggleston was in Fiddlers 4 in 2002. The band released its first album with the new lineup, Still Crooked in 2008, a live album in 2009, and Some Strange Country in 2010.

=== 2011 and beyond ===
In honor of their tenth anniversary together as a band, Crooked Still embarked on a major tour of the Northeast and the Pacific Northwest, and released a 7-song EP called Friends of Fall in October 2011. After the final show of their 2011 tour, Crooked Still took a three-year touring and recording hiatus (originally planned to be one year) for its members to pursue other musical projects.

Crooked Still performed at the FreshGrass festival in North Adams, Massachusetts, in September 2017.

In June 2018, Crooked Still songs "Little Sadie" and "Ecstasy" were featured in the gameplay trailer for The Last of Us Part II presented at E3 2018. These songs, along with "Ain't No Grave" were included in the final game.

In April 2025, Crooked Still appeared in the HBO series adaptation of The Last of Us, credited as Brittany and the Jug Boys.

== Discography ==
=== Albums ===
Year	Album details	US Folk
2004	Hop High: Release date: September 14, 2004; Label: Footprint Records	—
2006	Shaken by a Low Sound: Release date: August 22, 2006; Label: Signature Sounds Recordings	—
2008	Still Crooked: Release date: June 24, 2008; Label: Signature Sounds Recordings	—
2010	Some Strange Country: Release date: May 18, 2010; Label: Signature Sounds Recordings	15
2011	Friends of Fall: Release date: October 11, 2011; Label: Signature Sounds Recordings	—

=== Live albums ===
Year	Album details	US Folk
2009	Crooked Still Live: Release date: July 6, 2009; Label: Signature Sounds Recordings	—
2018	Live at Grey Fox July 16, 2006: Release date: November 16, 2018; Label: Signature Sounds Recordings	—

=== Music videos ===
Year	Video	Director
2010	"Half of What We Know"	Grey Sky Films
