= See You Around =

Studio album by I'm with Her
- Released: February 16, 2018
- Recorded: January 2016
- Genre: Progressive bluegrass
- Label: Rounder

I'm with Her chronology
See You Around (2018)	Wild and Clear and Blue (2025)

See You Around is the debut studio album of I'm with Her, a musical supergroup made up of Aoife O'Donovan, Sarah Jarosz, and Sara Watkins.

Described as an acoustic album, See You Around was recorded at Real World Studios in Bath, Somerset, England, three weeks after they had written it. The album was co-produced with Ethan Johns and released on February 16, 2018. The group toured in the U.S. and in Europe in the first half of 2018 to promote the album.

== Critical reception ==
Professional ratings
Review scores
Source	Rating
AllMusic	4/5 stars
American Songwriter	4/5 stars
The Independent	3/5 stars
PopMatters	9/10 stars

American Songwriter rated the album four out of five, describing it as "a sparse, precise collection of fine-tuned acoustic folk, complete with note-perfect instrumentation, warm three-part harmonies and deft songwriting from the trio of triple-threat singer-songwriter-multi-instrumentalists." PopMatters gave it a rating of nine out of ten, stating "The pervasive influence of folk and bluegrass is evident without feeling overt, giving the record sense of unity between introspective songwriting and instrumental prowess." AllMusic noted, "This is an album that doesn't hurry. It follows the contours of a soft breeze, sometimes picking up a little bit of momentum, but generally swaying and holding still." The Independent rated the album three stars.

== Track listing ==
No.	Title	Writer(s)	Length
1.	"See You Around"		3:48
2.	"Game to Lose"		3:45
3.	"Ain't That Fine"		3:08
4.	"Pangaea"		3:17
5.	"I-89"		3:01
6.	"Wild One"		3:58
7.	"Waitsfield"		2:34
8.	"Ryland (Under the Apple Tree)"	Julian Lage, Jarosz, O'Donovan, Watkins	3:29
9.	"Overland"		3:25
10.	"Crescent City"		2:59
11.	"Close It Down"		3:08
12.	"Hundred Miles"	Gillian Welch	3:32
