= No One Gets Out Alive (album) =

Studio album by Maggie Rose
- Released: April 12, 2024
- Genre: Southern soul, Americana
- Length: 45:34
- Label: Big Loud
- Producer: Ben Tanner

No One Gets Out Alive is the fourth studio album by American southern soul singer-songwriter Maggie Rose. It was released on April 12, 2024 via Big Loud Records, Rose's first album on the label, and was produced by Ben Tanner. The album was preceded by two singles - "Under the Sun", and the title track. A deluxe edition was released on February 28, 2025. The project received a positive critical reception and was nominated for the Grammy Award for Best Americana Album at the 67th Annual Grammy Awards, Rose's first Grammy nomination, and helped earn her an Emerging Act of the Year nomination at the 2025 Americana Music Honors & Awards.

== Track listing ==
Tracklist
No.	Title	Writer(s)	Length
1.	"No One Gets Out Alive"	Natalie Hemby; Maggie Rose; Sunny Sweeney	5:30
2.	"Fake Flowers"	Rose; Charles Harmon; Claude Kelly	3:09
3.	"Under the Sun"	Rose; Harmon; Kelly	3:49
4.	"Only Time Around"	Rose; Cliff Audrettch; Pat McLaughlin	3:52
5.	"Thinking of You"	Rose; Harmon; Kelly	3:19
6.	"Too Young"	Rose; Hemby	4:00
7.	"Mad Love"	Rose; Jordan Leigh Meredith; K.S. Rhoads	3:48
8.	"Underestimate Me"	Rose; Henry Brill; Chris Gelbuda	3:08
9.	"Dead Weight"	Rose; Kaitlyn Connor; Kyle Lewis	3:04
10.	"Vanish"	Rose; Harmon; Kelly	3:40
11.	"Lonely War"	Rose; Brill	4:38
12.	"Another Sad Song"	Rose; Brill; Gelbuda	3:32
Total length:			45:34
