= Maggie Antone =

American country and americana singer-songwriter (born 2002)

- Born: Margaret Antone Scott; July 27, 2002; Richmond, Virginia, United States
- Citizenship: US; Canada
- Occupations: Singer, songwriter
- Musical career
- Genres: Country; Americana; alternative country
- Instruments: Guitar, vocals
- Years active: 2021-present
- Labels: Island; Love Big; Thirty Tigers
- Website: Official website

Margaret Antone Scott, known professionally as Maggie Antone, is an American country music and americana singer and songwriter from Richmond, Virginia. She has released two albums on her own label Love Big, Interpretations (2022) and Rhinestoned (2024).

== Biography ==
Antone was born and raised in Richmond, Virginia. She is a dual citizen of both the United States and Canada. Antone began singing at a young age and first performed the American national anthem in a public venue at the age of seven. She began writing original songs when she was sixteen. In her sophomore year of high school, Antone won the Voice of RVA contest with an original song titled "Pawn Shop 12 String". She dropped out of college to pursue a full-time career in music.

Antone first drew public attention for her cover of Tyler Childers' song "Lady May" in 2022. On December 16, 2022, she released the seven-track covers album Interpretations on her own label, Love Big. On August 23, 2024, Antone released her second album Rhinestoned via Love Big and Thirty Tigers. The album is composed of original songs, including several previously released tracks such as "Everyone But You" and "Johnny Moonshine". Antone made her debut performance at the Grand Ole Opry on December 13, 2024. From January to April 2025, Antone embarked on her debut headlining tour, the "Rhinestoned Tour" across the United States. In December 2025, she released the song "The Devil's Not in Hell". In early 2026, Antone embarked on a headlining "Maggie Antone & The Rhinestones" tour of the United States.

In September 2026, Antone signed with Island Records.

== Tours ==
- Rhinestoned Tour (2025)
- Maggie Antone & The Rhinestones Tour (2026)

== Discography ==
=== Studio albums ===
List of albums, with selected details
Title	Details
Interpretations	Release date: December 16, 2022; Label: Love Big / The Orchard; Format: Digital download, streaming, vinyl
Rhinestoned	Release date: August 23, 2024; Label: Love Big / Thirty Tigers / The Orchard; Format: CD, digital download, streaming, vinyl

=== Music videos ===
Year	Video	Director
2023	"Suburban Outlaw"	Not listed
2024	"Johnny Moonshine"	Fisher Filmed It
