= The McCrary Sisters =

American gospel music quartet

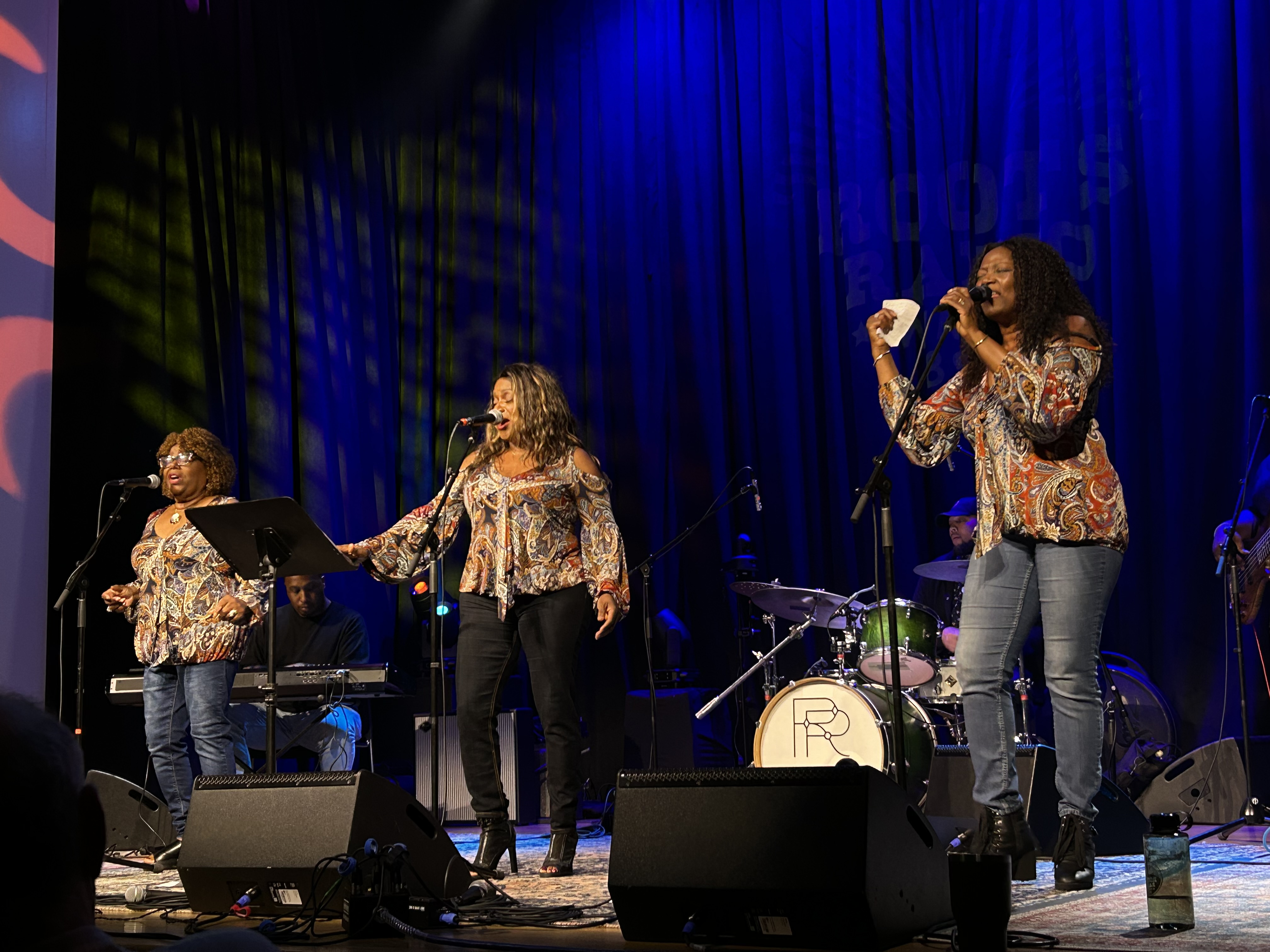
- Performing for WMOT Roots Radio in Nashville, Nov. 2024

Background information
- Origin: Nashville, Tennessee
- Genres: Gospel, Blues, Christian R&B, traditional black gospel, urban contemporary gospel
- Years active: 2010–present
- Label: McC
- Members: Ann McCrary; Regina McCrary; Alfreda McCrary
- Past members: Deborah McCrary
- Website: mccrarysisters.com

The McCrary Sisters are an American gospel music group from Nashville, Tennessee, formed in 2010 by sisters Ann McCrary, Deborah McCrary, Regina McCrary, and Alfreda McCrary. They have released four studio albums and one live album: Our Journey (2010), All the Way (2013), Let's Go (2015), Live (2017) and A Very McCrary Christmas (2019).

== Background ==
The McCrary Sisters are the daughters of a former Baptist preacher, Reverend Samuel H. "Sam" McCrary (1913-1991), who was a founding member of The Fairfield Four. The four members are Ann McCrary, Deborah McCrary, Regina McCrary, and Alfreda McCrary. Ann McCrary is a former session musician for many gospel music artists, and Regina toured with Bob Dylan from 1979 until 1985; Ann and Regina were also members of The Baptist, Catholic and Methodist Choir. Alfreda is married to Reverend Narcisco Lee, pastor of Old Happy Day Church, while Deborah was employed as a nurse.

== Music history ==
Their first recording, Our Journey, was released on October 26, 2010, from McC Records. Their subsequent studio album, All the Way, was released on March 25, 2013, through McC Records. They released Let's Go, on March 9, 2015, with McC Records. The group are part of the "house band" at the Americana Music Honors & Awards and provided backing vocals for the song "Choctaw County Affair" on Carrie Underwood's 2015 album, Storyteller, "Do Right By Me" on Margo Price's 2017 album All American Made and "All of the Women" on Allison Russell's 2021 album, Outside Child.

On June 1, 2022, it was announced that Deborah had died. In August 2022, they released the single “Shake It Off” which includes vocals by Deborah.

The McCrary Sisters were honored with the Legacy of Americana Lifetime Achievement Award from the Americana Music Association and National Museum of African American Music at the 2025 Americana Music Honors & Awards on September 10, 2025.

== Members ==
- Ann McCrary (born August 24, 1950)
- Deborah McCrary (June 17, 1954 – June 1, 2022)
- Regina McCrary (born May 22, 1958)
- Alfreda McCrary (born March 29, 1961)

== Discography ==
Studio albums

- Our Journey (October 26, 2010, McC)
- All the Way (March 25, 2013, McC)
- Let's Go (March 9, 2015, McC)
- A Very McCrary Christmas (November 15, 2019, Rounder)
- Love is the Only Key (July 15, 2025, McC)

Live albums

- Live (August 11, 2017, Soundly)
