= Mon Rovîa =

American musician

Janjay Lowe
- Born: Monrovia, Liberia
- Genre: Folk
- Occupation: Singer-songwriter
- Label: Nettwerk Music Group
- Website: https://monroviaboy.com/

Janjay Lowe, known professionally as Mon Rovîa, is an Afro-Appalachian singer-songwriter from Liberia who grew up in the United States.

== Early life ==
Janjay Lowe was born in Monrovia, Liberia. He was adopted around the age of seven by an American family, and during his early years his family lived in Florida, Montana, the Bahamas, and Tennessee. It was in Chattanooga, Tennessee where he was first exposed to folk music. As he began exploring his interest in music, he learned to play the ukulele, guitar, and other instruments.

== Career ==
Lowe uploaded his first song to SoundCloud in 2017 under the name Mon Rovîa, a name he chose in honor of his birthplace of Monrovia, Liberia. In 2020, he released his first EP, Sunburnt. His first album, Dark Continent, debuted in 2021 and featured a blend of hip-hop, trap, R&B, and folk influences. During 2022, his style shifted towards folk music with songs like "Vulture Culture," "Where the Rivers Run," and "Borderline."

Starting in July 2023, he began releasing a series of four EPs based on the structure of the hero's journey: Act 1: The Wandering, Act 2: Trials, Act 3: The Dying of Self, and Act 4: Atonement. One of the singles from Act 4: Atonement, "Winter Wash 24," was inspired by the work of the International Rescue Committee, and all the proceeds from the single went to this organization.

Mon Rovîa was named one of Spotify's 2024 "Juniper Artists to Watch", and he made his music festival debut at Bonnaroo in 2024. He has also achieved a significant following on TikTok, with over 500 million views as of October 2024. He made his debut Grand Ole Opry performance in July 2025.

== Discography ==
- Sunburnt (EP) (2020)
- Dark Continent (2021)
- Act 1: The Wandering (EP) (2023)
- Act 2: Trials (EP) (2023)
- Act 3: The Dying of Self (EP) (2024)
- Act 4: Atonement (EP) (2025)
- Bloodline (2026)

== Singles ==
Year	Song	Peak chart positions		Album
Year	Song	US AAA	US Air	Album
2025	"Heavy Foot"	3	30	Bloodline
2026	"Field Song"	17	—	Bloodline
