= Rushad Eggleston =

American musician and composer

- Eggleston performing in 2007

Background information
- Born: September 30, 1979 (age 46)
- Genres: Rock, jazz, Americana, bluegrass
- Occupations: Musician & Composer
- Instruments: cello, kazoo, guitar, viola
- Years active: 1999–present
- Website: rushad.bandcamp.com/music

Rushad Robert Eggleston (born September 30, 1979) is an American cellist, composer, jazz vocalist, and performer. Eggleston's music can be eccentric, with many references to fantasy and goblins. Eggleston is known for inventing words, and for his imaginative world called The Land of Sneth.

== Early years ==
Eggleston was born to a Parsi mother from Mumbai and a Caucasian father who changed his name from Bob to “Raboon” following a trip to Nicaragua. He graduated from Carmel High School in Carmel, California, and played the cello as a member of the Youth Music Monterey orchestra in Monterey Bay. Later he attended the Berklee College of Music in Boston, Massachusetts, on a full scholarship, the first ever awarded to a string player. There Eggleston studied cello with Associate Professor Eugene Friesen and graduated in May 2003.

== Career ==
After releasing a small-press album called Nico and Rushad in 1999 (with fellow musician Nico Georis), Eggleston made his large-scale recording debut with his self-titled Compass Records release with Fiddlers 4, which was nominated for a 2002 Grammy, as well as with Darol Anger's Republic of Strings, bringing him to national prominence. Eggleston has toured extensively with Darol Anger's Republic of Strings, Fiddler's 4, and the alternative folk/bluegrass group he helped found, Crooked Still, and he has performed in 49 states and more than 15 countries as of 2013. Crooked Still released two CDs with Eggleston, Hop High in 2004 and Shaken by a Low Sound in 2006. Eggleston also released a more experimental album named Playhouse of the Universe on July 10, 2006, with The Wild Band of Snee, as well as the album, Rushad Eggleston & The Butt Wizards. Eggleston left Crooked Still in November 2007 to pursue other styles of music. He was replaced by Brittany Haas on fiddle and Tristan Clarridge on cello.

Eggleston was an instructor at Mark O'Connor's fiddle camps from 2001 to 2007, as well as at Mike Block's String Camp in 2012 and 2013. He has also taught Cello at Maine Fiddle Camp at camp NEOFA, at Valley of the Moon (2015), Big Sur Fiddle Camp, and Rocky Mountain Fiddle Camp (2013, 2014). Eggleston has also guest lectured at colleges and universities including Berkelee, Cornish (Seattle), Bates College (Maine), and Oberlin (Ohio). Eggleston gave a TEDx talk in 2013 at Facebook headquarters in Palo Alto.

Eggleston formed the power trio Tornado Rider consisting of Scott Manke (drums) and Graham Terry (bass) in 2008, and their debut album Do You Have Time (2009) was followed up by Jark Matter (2011). The high-energy performances have included Eggleston crowd surfing repeatedly and climbing stage scaffolding. Tornado Rider has been equated with frogs playing metal, and many of the songs are simple yet catchy anthems about animals. Tornado Rider fans are strongest in Florida and the southeast, and the band will occasionally reunite to play festivals. (Wakarusa 2013, SpringFest 2014, Bear Mountain Music Fest 2015, SpringReunion 2017).

Eggleston released his first full-length solo album, The Rushad Eggleston Show in 2013. This was followed by twin albums Very Advanced Song Machine and Growl & Glide, his first solo cello recording, in 2015. He has been touring as a solo act since 2013, often referring to himself as Rushadilicus or simply as the Cello Goblin. Eggleston has brought the Land of Sneth to people in places like Australia, Bali, Lithuania, and Sicily, building a network of global fans.

In 2015, Eggleston did a brief tour featuring duet concerts with guitarist Beppe Gambetta, after playing in Beppe's hometown of Genoa, Italy for the Acoustic Nights festival.

Since 2017, Eggleston has performed under the name "Rushadicus".

== Personal life ==
On May 15, 2013, Eggleston proposed to Lauren Alia Collins, a model and artist from Seattle whom he nicknamed "Mouse Princess.” She helped Eggleston develop his brand and tours and film videos for him. Collins and Eggleston divorced in 2018.

Eggleston is a vegan and recorded a viral song and video about his love of tofu.

== Selected discography ==
- Nico and Rushad (1999)
- Fiddlers 4 (2002)
- Hop High (2004)
- Shaken by a Low Sound (2006)
- Playhouse of the Universe (2006)
- Rushad Eggleston & The Butt Wizards (2006)
- Do You Have Time (2009)
- Jark Matter (2011)
- The Rushad Eggleston Show (2013)
- Very Advanced Song Machine (2015)
- Growl & Glide (2015)
- Snethy Adventure Songs!!! (2017)
- magic potato carpet (2018)
- adventures of donna and bill (2019)
- misadventures of rumeo (2020)
- BORONA VIRUS (2020)
- Rumeo Loses Again (2023)
