= I'm with Her (band) =

American band

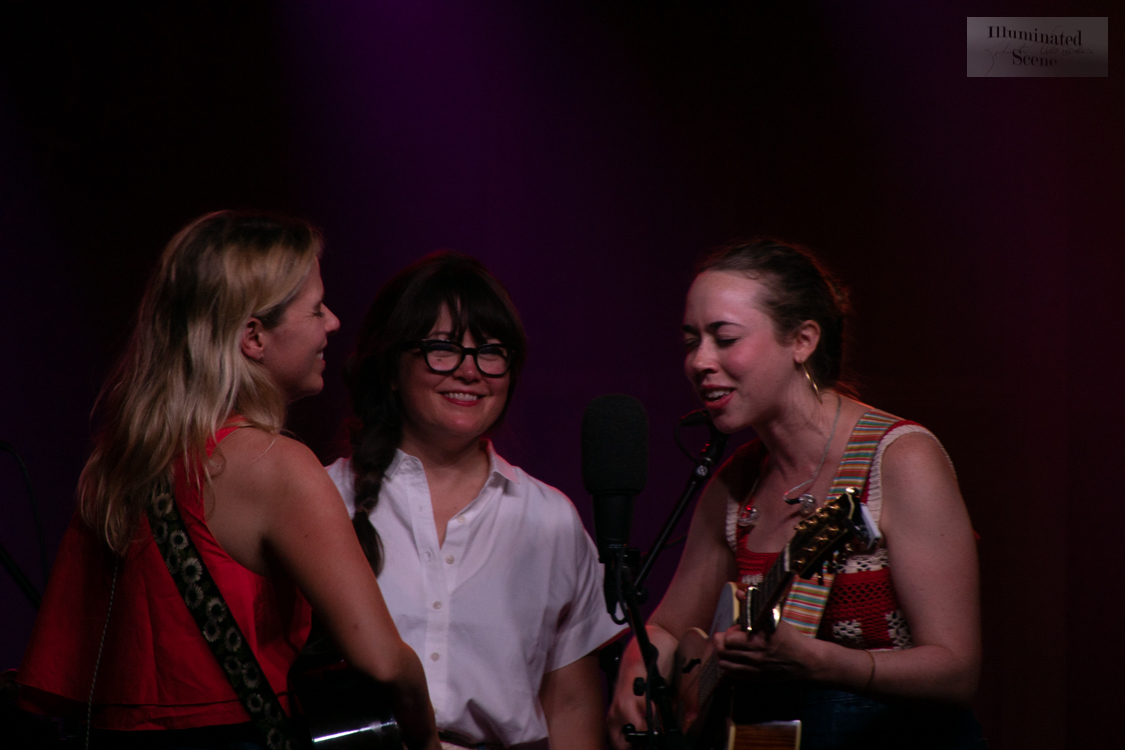
- I'm with Her performing in 2019

Background information
- Origin: United States
- Genres: Americana; bluegrass; folk; gospel
- Years active: 2014–present
- Members: Sara Watkins; Sarah Jarosz; Aoife O'Donovan
- Website: imwithherband.com

I'm with Her is an American band consisting of singer-songwriters and multi-instrumentalists Sara Watkins (violin, guitar and ukulele), Sarah Jarosz (banjo, mandolin, octave mandolin and guitar), and Aoife O'Donovan (keyboard and guitar).

In 2020, their song "Call My Name" received nominations for two Grammy Awards: Best American Roots Performance and Best American Roots Song, winning the latter. In 2026, their album, Wild and Clear and Blue, won the Grammy Award for Best Folk Album, with the track "Ancient Light" winning Best American Roots Song.

== History ==
When Sarah Jarosz (b. 1991) was nine years old, she met Sara Watkins (b. 1981) at a festival. Both of them grew up with bluegrass music. Jarosz began playing the mandolin when she was ten, and Aoife O'Donovan (b. 1982) noticed her when Jarosz was fifteen. O'Donovan said about Jarosz:

You were this amazing young person. You just had so much confidence and skill but you were never, like, "Look at me, I'm so good and I'm so young, heh heh heh." You always seemed like a peer.

Watkins, Jarosz and O'Donovan started collaborating at a workshop at the 2014 Telluride Bluegrass Festival, where they had been asked to sing together. They performed for the first time at the January 2015 Celtic Connections festival in Scotland, and continued to tour in Europe. In mid-2015, they wrote songs together for four days in Los Angeles, where Watkins lives. In December that year, they wrote for eight days at a farmhouse in Vermont with a hot tub and a wood-burning fireplace, surrounded by snow and near a barn with horses. The group began using the phrase "I'm with Her" as their tour name in early 2015. The phrase was later adopted by the 2016 Hillary Clinton presidential campaign, unrelated to the band.

The group covered John Hiatt's "Crossing Muddy Waters" in 2015, and released the single "Little Lies" in 2017, touring the US later that year. They recorded their debut album See You Around at Real World Studios in Bath, Somerset, England, three weeks after they had written it. The album was co-produced by Ethan Johns and released on February 16, 2018. American singer-songwriter Gillian Welch wrote the album's last track "Hundred Miles"; the trio is credited with writing all other songs on the album. The group toured in the U.S. and in Europe in the first half of 2018.

At the 62nd Grammy Awards on January 26, 2020, I'm with Her won the award for Best American Roots Song for their recording of "Call My Name." The song was co-written by Jarosz, Watkins, and O'Donovan.

In March 2025, the band announced a new album and tour, titled Wild and Clear and Blue, to be released on May 9, 2025. The group also released a single titled "Ancient Light".

== Discography ==
=== Albums ===
- See You Around (Rounder, 2018)
- Wild and Clear and Blue (Rounder, 2025)

=== Singles ===
- "Crossing Muddy Waters" / "Be My Husband" (Sugar Hill, 2015)
- "Little Lies" (Rounder, 2017)
- "Send My Love (To Your New Lover)" live featuring Paul Kowert (Rounder, 2017)
- "Call My Name" (Rounder, 2019)
- "Espresso" (2024)
- "Ancient Light" (Rounder, 2025)
- "Find My Way to You" (Rounder, 2025)

== Awards and nominations ==
Award	Year	Award	Nominated work	Result	Ref.
Americana Music Association	2018	Duo/Group of the Year	Themselves	Won	
Americana Music Association	2025	Song of the Year	"Ancient Light"	Won	
Grammy Awards	2020	Best American Roots Performance	"Call My Name"	Nominated	
Grammy Awards	2020	Best American Roots Song	"Call My Name"	Won	
Grammy Awards	2026	Best Folk Album	Wild and Clear and Blue	Won	
Grammy Awards	2026	Best American Roots Performance	"Ancient Light"	Nominated	
Grammy Awards	2026	Best American Roots Song	"Ancient Light"	Won	
