= Wild and Clear and Blue =

Studio album by I'm with Her
- Released: May 9, 2025
- Studio: The Outlier Inn (Woodridge); The Clubhouse (Rhinebeck); Little Pink (Kingston)
- Length: 41:10
- Label: Rounder; Universal Music
- Producer: Josh Kaufman

I'm with Her chronology
See You Around (2018)	Wild and Clear and Blue (2025)

Singles from Wild and Clear and Blue
- 1. "Ancient Light" Released: March 4, 2025; 2. "Find My Way to You" Released: March 26, 2025; 3. "Standing on the Fault Line" Released: April 18, 2025

Wild and Clear and Blue is the second album by folk supergroup I'm with Her, released on May 9, 2025, via Rounder Records and Universal Music. The album was recorded at The Outlier Inn and The Clubhouse and was produced by Josh Kaufman.

== Singles ==
On March 4, 2025, the group released the first single from Wild and Clear and Blue, titled "Ancient Light", accompanied by a music video filmed by the group as they recorded the album at The Clubhouse in Rhinebeck, New York.

The second single released is titled "Find My Way to You", released March 26, 2025. The third single, titled "Standing on the Fault Line", was released April 18, 2025.

== Reception ==
Professional ratings
Review scores
Source	Rating
AllMusic	4/5 stars
Spill	4.5/5 stars
PopMatters	9/10 stars

AllMusic's Mark Deming described the album as "smart, beautifully crafted music that will please those who liked the group's debut." Ljubinko Zivkovic of Spill Magazine gave it a rating of four and a half and opined about the album's vocal harmony alignment, calling "such music quite timeless". Country Universe gave the album four and a half stars, writing "No one conveys urgency or intensity in quiet like these three when they’re in sync, and they’re in lockstep of moral clarity here." Steve Horowitz at PopMatters reviewed the album as a 9 out of 10, writing, "Wild and Clear and Blue is the kind of album that initially knocks one out because of the obvious talents of its performers, but then sneaks up on the listener upon reflection through an appreciation of its deeper concerns."

== Awards ==
Their single "Ancient Light" was named song of the year at the Americana Music Honors & Awards in 2025.

The album won Best Folk Album at the 2025 Grammy Awards and "Ancient Light" won a Grammy for Best American Roots Song. The song was also nominated for Best American Roots Performance.

== Track listing ==
All tracks are written by Sarah Jarosz, Aoife O'Donovan, and Sara Watkins.

Wild and Clear and Blue track listing
No.	Title	Length
1.	"Ancient Light"	3:34
2.	"Wild and Clear and Blue"	3:35
3.	"Sisters of the Night Watch"	4:36
4.	"Different Rocks, Different Hills"	3:41
5.	"Standing on the Fault Line"	4:30
6.	"Mother Eagle (Sing Me Alive)"	3:36
7.	"Only Daughter"	4:32
8.	"Find My Way to You"	3:20
9.	"Strawberry Moonrise"	1:07
10.	"Year After Year"	3:23
11.	"Rhododendron"	5:16
Total length:		41:10

== Personnel ==
Credits adapted from the album's liner notes.

=== I'm with Her ===
- Sarah Jarosz – vocals, octave mandolin, mandolin, acoustic guitar, electric guitar, banjo
- Aoife O'Donovan – vocals, acoustic guitar, baritone electric guitar, piano
- Sara Watkins – vocals, fiddle, cello, Hammond B3 organ

=== Additional contributors ===
- Josh Kaufman – production, additional recording, additional engineering, nylon-string guitar, electric guitar, tenor guitar, bass, fretless bass, lap steel, vibraphone, percussion, piano, organ, synthesizers, harmonium, drones, Hammond B3 organ, transistor organ, Wurlitzer electric piano
- D. James Goodwin – engineering, mixing
- Gillian Pelkonen – engineering
- Joe Kress – engineering assistance
- Josh Druckman – engineering assistance
- Paul Blakemore – mastering
- JT Bates – drums, percussion
- Alysse Gafkjen – cover photography
- Daniel Murphy – package design

== Charts ==
Chart performance for Wild and Clear and Blue
Chart (2025)	Peak position
UK Album Downloads (OCC)	27
