= Brittany Haas =

American fiddle player (born 1987)

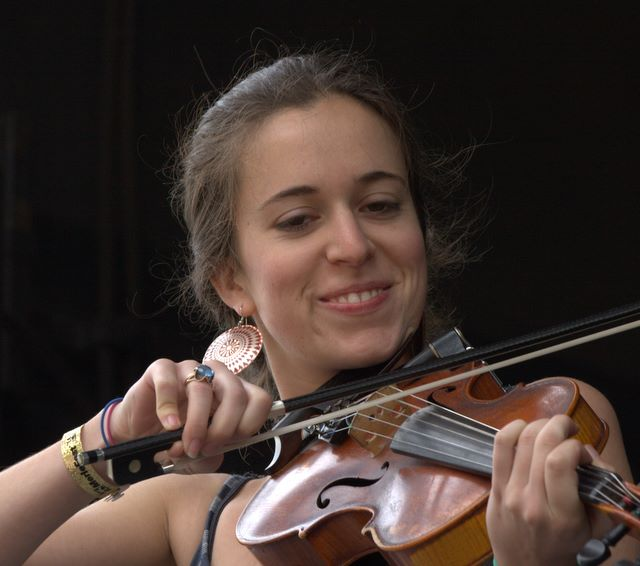
- Haas performing at MerleFest in Wilkes County, North Carolina, in 2011

Background information
- Born: Brittany Caroline Haas; 1987 (age 38–39)
- Origin: Menlo Park, California, United States
- Genres: Folk, bluegrass
- Occupation: Musician
- Instrument: Fiddle
- Member of: Crooked Still; Punch Brothers; Hawktail
- Website: brittanyhaas.com

Brittany Caroline Haas (born 1987) is an American fiddle player, who also sings and plays the banjo. She is a member of the Boston-based alternative bluegrass band Crooked Still, which is currently on hiatus. She was a regular performer on Live From Here. She tours with the Haas Marshall Walsh trio, and participates in many international fiddlecamps, including the Ossipee Valley Music Festival. As of 2018, she is a member of Hawktail, which includes Paul Kowert and Jordan Tice. The group was formerly known as Haas Kowert Tice. In June 2023 she was announced as the new fiddle player for Americana band Punch Brothers, replacing founding member Gabe Witcher. Her sister Natalie Haas plays cello with a similarly diverse group of musicians.

== Early life ==
Haas grew up in Menlo Park, California. When she was eight years old, her violin teacher gave her some bluegrass sheet music to practice sight reading. For the next five years she took both classical violin and bluegrass fiddle lessons. When she heard Bruce Molsky, she recalls: "that's what I want to do". At 13 years of age, she switched to the fiddle as her primary instrument.

== Career timeline ==
- In 2001, when Haas was 14, she toured with Darol Anger's Republic of Strings.
- In 2004, she released her debut, self-titled solo album (produced by Anger on Ook). It included guest musicians Bruce Molsky, Darol Anger, Todd Sickafoose, Mike Marshall, and her sister, cellist Natalie Haas.
- 2005-2009 while at Princeton joined the “chamber grass” band Crooked Still, with whom she has made four recordings and toured the world.
- Haas graduated from Princeton University in 2009 with a degree in Evolutionary Biology and a minor in Music Performance. She was a member of the Princeton University Band.
- Haas, Sierra Hull (mandolin), Alison Brown (banjo), Todd Phillips (bass), Andy Hall (Dobro), Matt Wingate (guitar) were members of the Porchlight Band, the house band for the bluegrass documentary Porchlight Sessions (cira 2011).
- In 2015 she and Lauren Rioux recorded a video together on the Roots Channel and often join other groups.
- Haas went on tour as part of the band Dave Rawlings Machine, in support of their album Nashville Obsolete. Haas appeared on multiple tracks as a guest performer. The tour started in November 2015 and continued through April 2016.
- From 2003 - current, Haas performs with the Haas Kowert Tice trio, with Paul Kowert on bass and Jordan Tice on guitar. The group was renamed Hawktail with the addition of Dominick Leslie on mandolin.
- Haas appeared on the David Rawlings' Band Acony Records release Poor David's Almanack.
- In 2020, she won the Instrumentalist of the Year award at the Americana Music Honors & Awards.
- in 2021, she was selected as Artist in Residence at East Tennessee State University.
- In 2023, she was selected to be the new fiddle player in the Punch Brothers.

== Discography ==
=== Solo ===
- Brittany Haas (2004)

=== With Crooked Still ===
- Hop High (2004)
- Still Crooked (2008)
- Crooked Still Lives (2009)
- Some Strange Country (2010)

=== With The Fundies ===
- The Fundies (EP) (2012)

=== With Haas Kowert Tice Trio ===
- You Got This (2014)

=== With Dave Rawlings Machine ===
- Nashville Obsolete (2015)

=== With Lena Jonsson ===
- A mix of traditional American tunes, traditional Swedish tunes and a few originals. (2015)

=== With Hawktail ===
- Unless (2018)
- Formations (2020)
- Place of Growth (2022)
- Vasen and Hawktail (2024)
- Aoife O'Donovan & Hawktail Play All My Friends (EP) (2024)

=== With Natalie Haas ===
- Haas (2023)

=== With Punch Brothers ===
- The Unsung Adventures of Punch Brothers (2026)
