= Béla Fleck discography =

- Studio albums: 25
- Live albums: 1
- Compilation albums: 1
- Singles: 17
- Music videos: 3
- As featured artist: 6
- Collaboration albums: 13
- Other appearances: 77

This is the discography of the Grammy-winning banjoist Béla Fleck which consists of 25 studio albums (15 solo, two with Tasty Licks, three with Spectrum, two with Sparrow Quartet, three with Abigail Washburn), 13 collaboration albums, one live album, three music videos, 22 singles (16 as lead artist and six as featured artist), and 76 other appearances.

== Albums ==
=== Studio albums ===
==== Solo albums ====
Title	Album details
Crossing the Tracks	Released: 1979; Label: Rounder; Format: Vinyl, LP
Natural Bridge	Released: 1982; Label: Rounder; Format: Vinyl, LP
Deviation	Released: 1984; Label: Rounder; Format: Vinyl, LP
Double Time	Released: 1984; Label: Rounder; Format: Vinyl, LP
Inroads	Released: 1986; Label: Rounder; Format: Vinyl, LP
Drive	Released: 1988; Label: Rounder; Format: CD
Tales from the Acoustic Planet	Released: 1995; Label: Warner Bros.; Format: CD
The Bluegrass Sessions: Tales from the Acoustic Planet, Vol. 2	Released: June 22, 1999; Label: Warner Bros.; Format: CD
Perpetual Motion	Released: October 2, 2001; Label: Sony; Format: CD
Tales from the Acoustic Planet, Vol. 3: Africa Sessions	Released: March 3, 2009; Label: Rounder; Format: CD, digital download
Throw Down Your Heart: Africa Sessions Part 2	Released: 2010; Label: Acoustic Planet; Format: CD, digital download
The Impostor	Released: August 13, 2013; Label: Mercury; Format: CD, digital download
My Bluegrass Heart	Released: September 10, 2021; Label: Renew; Format: CD, digital download, streaming
Rhapsody in Blue	Release: February 12, 2024; Label: Thirty Tigers; Format: CD, digital download, streaming

==== Tasty Licks ====
Title	Album details
Tasty Licks	Released: 1978; Label: Rounder; Format: Vinyl, LP
Anchored to the Shore	Released: 1979; Label: Rounder; Format: Vinyl, LP

==== Spectrum ====
Title	Album details
Opening Roll	Released: 1980; Label: Rounder; Format: Vinyl, LP
Live in Japan	Released: 1983; Label: Rounder; Format: Vinyl, LP
It's Too Hot for Words	Released: 1982; Label: Rounder; Format: Vinyl, LP

==== Sparrow Quartet ====
Title	Album details
Abigail Washburn & The Sparrow Quartet	Released: May 20, 2008; Label: Nettwerk; Format: CD, digital download
The Sparrow Quartet EP	Released: May 29, 2009; Label: Nettwerk; Format: CD

==== Abigail Washburn ====
Title	Album details
Béla Fleck & Abigail Washburn	Released: October 7, 2014; Label: Rounder; Format: Vinyl, LP digital download
Banjo Banjo	Released: February 5, 2016; Label: Rounder; Format: Vinyl, 12", 45 RPM, digital download, streaming
Echo in the Valley	Released: October 20, 2017; Label: Rounder; Format: Vinyl, LP, digital download, streaming

=== Collaborations ===
Title	Album details
Fiddle Tunes for Banjo (Tony Trischka, Bill Keith, and Béla Fleck)	Release 1981; Label: Rounder; Format: Vinyl, LP
Snakes Alive! (Jerry Douglas, Blaine Sprouse, Pat Enright, Roland White, Mark Hembree, and Béla Fleck as Dreadful Snakes)	Released: 1983; Label: Rounder; Format: Vinyl, LP
The Telluride Sessions (Jerry Douglas, Mark O'Connor, Edgar Meyer, and Sam Bush, Béla Fleck as Strength in Numbers)	Released: 1989; Label: MCA Nashville; Format: Vinyl, LP
Solo Banjo Works (Tony Trischka and Béla Fleck)	Released: 1992; Label: Rounder; Format: CD
Tabula Rasā (Jie-Bing Chen, Vishwa Mohan Bhatt, and Béla Fleck)	Released: July 2, 1996; Label: Water Lily Acoustics; Format: CD
Uncommon Ritual (Mike Marshall, Edgar Meyer, and Béla Fleck)	Released: September 30, 1997; Label: Sony Classical; Format: CD
The Enchantment (Chick Corea and Béla Fleck)	Released: May 22, 2007; Label: Concord; Format: CD
The Melody of Rhythm: Triple Concerto & Music for Trio (Edgar Meyer, Zakir Hussain, and Béla Fleck with Rakesh Chaurasia)	Released: August 25, 2009; Label: Koch; Format: CD, digital download
Across the Imaginary Divide (Marcus Roberts and Béla Fleck)	Released: June 5, 2012; Label: Rounder; Format: CD, digital download
Two (Chick Corea and Béla Fleck)	Released: September 11, 2015; Label: Stretch; Format: Digital download, streaming
The Ripple Effect (Toumani Diabaté and Béla Fleck)	Released: March 27, 2020; Label: Craft; Format: Vinyl, LP, digital download, streaming
"As We Speak" (Edgar Meyer, Zakir Hussain, and Béla Fleck with Rakesh Chaurasia)	Release: May 12, 2023; Label: Thirty Tigers; Format: Digital download, streaming
Remembrance (Chick Corea and Béla Fleck)	Released: May 10, 2024; Label: Thirty Tigers; Format: Digital download, streaming
BEATrio (Béla Fleck, Edmar Castañeda and Antonio Sánchez)	Released: May 16, 2025; Label: Thirty Tigers; Format: Vinyl LP, CD, Digital download, streaming
The Fiddle and the Drum (Renée Fleming and Béla Fleck)	Released: May 29, 2026; Label: Thirty Tigers; Format: Vinyl LP, CD, Digital download, streaming

=== Live albums ===
Title	Album details
Music for Two (Edgar Meyer and Béla Fleck)	Released: May 24, 2004; Label: Sony Classical; Format: CD

=== Compilation albums ===
Title	Album details
Daybreak	Release 1987; Label: Rounder; Format: CD
Places	Released: 1988; Label: Rounder; Format: CD

== Singles ==
=== As lead artist ===
Title	Year	Album
"Pile-Up" (with Edgar Meyer)	2004	Music For Two
"The Well-Tempered Clavier, Book 1: Prelude 24 in B Minor BMV 869" (Arr. B. Fleck & E. Meyer) (with Edgar Meyer)	2004	Music For Two
"Sunrise" (featuring Sam Bush)	2018	Non-album single
Come All Ye Coal Miners / Take Me to Harlan (with Abigail Washburn)	2018	Echo in the Valley
"Christmas Time's a Coming (And I Know I'm Staying Home) (with Abigail Washburn)	2020	Non-album single
"Charm School" (featuring Billy Strings and Chris Thile)	2021	My Bluegrass Heart
"Vertigo" (featuring Sam Bush, Stuart Duncan, Edgar Meyer, and Bryan Sutton)	2021	My Bluegrass Heart
"Wheels Up" (featuring Sierra Hull and Molly Tuttle)	2021	My Bluegrass Heart
"Owl's Misfortune" (with Edgar Meyer, Zakir Hussain featuring Rakesh Chaurasia)	2023	As We Speak
"Unidentified Piece for Banjo"	2023	Rhapsody in Blue
"Rhapsody in Blue (grass)"	2024	Rhapsody in Blue
"Remembrance" (with Chick Corea)	2024	Remembrance
"Juno" (with Chick Corea)	2024	Remembrance
"Sakkarakaari" - Tamil (with Raghu Dixit and Madhan Karky)	2024	Non-album singles
"Sakkarakaari" - Hindi (with Raghu Dixit and Neeraj Rajawat)	2024	Non-album singles
"Chakkera Pilla" - Telugu (with Raghu Dixit and Kittu Vissapragada)	2024	Non-album singles
"Let the Creek Rise" (with Bill Evans and Jerry Douglas)	2024	Non-album singles

=== As featured artist ===
Title	Year	Album	Ref.
"Don't Drink the Water" (Dave Matthews Band featuring Alanis Morissette and Béla Fleck)	1998	Before These Crowded Streets	(Note: "Drink the Water" featuring Alanis Morissette and Béla Fleck peaked at No. 23 on Billboard's Active Rock charts) (Note: "Drink the Water" featuring Alanis Morissette and Béla Fleck peaked at No. 19 on Billboard's Mainstream Rock Airplay charts) (Note: "Drink the Water" featuring Alanis Morissette and Béla Fleck peaked at No. 50 on Billboard's Radio Songs charts) (Note: "Drink the Water" featuring Alanis Morissette and Béla Fleck peaked at No. 4 on Billboard's Alternative Airplay charts) (Note: "Drink the Water" featuring Alanis Morissette and Béla Fleck peaked at No. 3 on RPM's Alternative Rock charts) (Note: "Drink the Water" featuring Alanis Morissette and Béla Fleck peaked at No. 34 on RPM's Singles charts)
"Stars" (Bootsy Collins with Dr. Cornel West featuring EmiSunshine, Chew Fu, Uche’ Ndubizu, Steve Jordan, Christone "Kingfish" Ingram, Victor Wooten, Brian Culbertson, Az Yet, Olvido Ruiz, Manou Gallo, and Béla Fleck)	2020	Non-album singles	
"I Wish I Knew How It Would Feel to Be Free" (The Blind Boys of Alabama featuring Béla Fleck)	2021	Non-album singles	
"Better 'N You" (Allan Corby featuring Béla Fleck)	2022	Non-album singles	
"Eye of the Tiger" (Scary Pockets featuring Mario Jose and Béla Fleck)	2023	Non-album singles	
"Sakkare Chakori" - Kannada (Raghu Dixit and Kiran Kaverappa featuring Béla Fleck)	2024	Non-album singles	

== Music videos ==
Title	Year	Artist(s)	Album	Ref.
"Don't Let It Bring You Down"	2017	Béla Fleck and Abigail Washburn	Echo in the Valley	
"Let It Go"	2018	Béla Fleck and Abigail Washburn	Echo in the Valley	
"Come All You Coal Miners/Take Me To Harlan" (featuring Pilobolus)	2018	Béla Fleck and Abigail Washburn	Echo in the Valley	

== Production and songwriting ==
These are writing and production credits for music outside of Béla Fleck's own solo work, Béla Fleck and the Flecktones, with Abigail Washburn, and others listed.

Title	Year	Artist(s)	Album	Notes
—N/a	1988	Maura O'Connell	Just in Time	Producer
"Burn On"	2006	Béla Fleck	Sail Away: The Songs of Randy Newman	Recorder, producer, and mixer
"People Watchin'"	2007	Keller Williams	Dream	Engineer
—N/a	2009	Bryan Sutton and Friends	Almost Live	Composer

== Other appearances ==
Title	Year	Credited artist(s)	Album	Ref.
"Crooked Smile"	1985	Sam Bush	Late as Usual	
—N/a	1985	Hobo Jim	Lost and Dyin' Breed	
—N/a	1988	Leon Redbone	No Regrets	
"Don't You Hear Jerusalem Moan"	1989	Nitty Gritty Dirt Band	Will the Circle Be Unbroken: Volume Two	
"Little Mountain Church House"	1989	Nitty Gritty Dirt Band	Will the Circle Be Unbroken: Volume Two	
"I'm Sittin' on Top of the World"	1989	Nitty Gritty Dirt Band	Will the Circle Be Unbroken: Volume Two	
"Will the Circle Be Unbroken"	1989	Nitty Gritty Dirt Band	Will the Circle Be Unbroken: Volume Two	
—N/a	1989	Øystein Sunde	Kjekt å Ha	
"Happy to Meet"	1992	The Chieftains	Another Country	
"Killybegs"	1992	The Chieftains	Another Country	
"Finale: Did You Ever Go-A-Courtin', Uncle Joe/Will the Circle Be Unbroken"	1992	The Chieftains	Another Country	
—N/a	1992	Shawn Colvin	Fat City	
"Riker's Mailbox"	1994	Phish	Hoist	
"Lifeboy"	1994	Phish	Hoist	
"Scent of a Mule"	1994	Phish	Hoist	
"Birdland"	1994	Jerry Douglas	The Great Dobro Sessions	
"Wave"	1994	Mike Auldridge	The Great Dobro Sessions	
"Wake Forest"	1994	Mike Auldridge	The Great Dobro Sessions	
"White Wheeled Limousine"	1995	Bruce Hornsby	Hot House	
"The Meeting"	1995	David Grier	Lone Soldier	
"Alphabet Soup"	1995	David Grier	Lone Soldier	
"Segue"	1996	Curandero	Aras	
"Embrujada"	1996	Curandero	Aras	
"Man of the Shadows"	1996	Curandero	Aras	
"Once Upon a Time"	1996	Curandero	Aras	
"Amarillo Barbados"	1996	Ginger Baker	Falling Off the Roof	
"Au Privave"	1996	Ginger Baker	Falling Off the Roof	
"Taney County"	1996	Ginger Baker	Falling Off the Roof	
"The Last Stop"	1998	Dave Matthews Band	Before These Crowded Streets	
"Spoon"	1998	Dave Matthews Band (featuring Alanis Morissette and Béla Fleck)	Before These Crowded Streets	
"Zenergy"	1999	Victor Wooten (featuring Carter Beauford and Béla Fleck)	Yin-Yang	
"Dance On Your Head"	1999	Leftover Salmon (featuring Jeff Coffin, Reese Wynans, and Béla Fleck)	The Nashville Sessions	
"Up On the Hill Where We Do the Boogie"	1999	Leftover Salmon (featuring Reese Wynans and Béla Fleck)	The Nashville Sessions	
"Old Dominion"	1999	Eddie from Ohio	Looking Out the Fishbowl	
"The Inlaw Josie Wales"	2000	Phish	Farmhouse	
"Dark as a Dungeon"	2001	John Cowan	A Tribute to John Hartford: Live From Mountain Stage	
"On the Road"	2001	Béla Fleck	A Tribute to John Hartford: Live From Mountain Stage	
"Just Because"	2002	Jorma Kaukonen	Blue Country Heart	
"Bread Line Blues"	2002	Jorma Kaukonen	Blue Country Heart	
"Down the Old Plank Road"	2002	The Chieftans (with John Hiatt, Jeff White, Tim O'Brien, and Béla Fleck)	Down the Old Plank Road: The Nashville Sessions	
"Dark as a Dungeon"	2002	The Chieftans (with Vince Gill and Béla Fleck)	Down the Old Plank Road: The Nashville Sessions	
"Molly Bán (Bawn)"	2002	The Chieftans (with Alison Krauss and Béla Fleck)	Down the Old Plank Road: The Nashville Sessions	
"Give the Fiddler a Dram"	2002		Down the Old Plank Road: The Nashville Sessions	
"Bonnaroo Traveler"	2002	Edgar Meyer	Live From Bonnaroo Music Festival 2002	
"Amazing Grace"	2003	Rory Gallagher	Wheels Within Wheels	
"Walkin' Blues"	2003	Rory Gallagher	Wheels Within Wheels	
"Deep Elem Blues"	2003	Rory Gallagher	Wheels Within Wheels	
"La Salsa en Mi"	2003	Bernie Williams	The Journey Within	
"Stranded on the Bridge"	2003	Bernie Williams	The Journey Within	
—N/a	2003	Mike Gordon	Inside In	
"Polka on the Banjo"	2003	Jimmy Sturr and His Orchestra	Let's Polka 'Round	
"Patchwork Quilt	2003	Gov't Mule (featuring Béla Fleck)	The Deepest End: Live in Concert	
"Lay of the Sunflower"	2003	Gov't Mule (featuring Béla Fleck)	The Deepest End: Live in Concert	
"Força"	2003	Nelly Furtado	Folklore	
—N/a	2003	Michael Card	A Fragile Stone	
—N/a	2004	Dave Matthews Band	Live Trax Vol. 1: 12.8.98 Centrum Centre, Worcester, MA	
—N/a	2004	Charlie Peacock	Full Circle: A Celebration of Songs and Friends	
—N/a	2005	Jeff Coffin	Bloom	
"Who's Your Uncle?"	2005	Jerry Douglas	The Best Kept Secret	
—N/a	2005	Jamie Hartford	Part of Your History: The Songs of John Hartford	
—N/a	2006	Dave Matthews Band	Live Trax Vol. 7: 12.31.96 Hamptom Coliseum, Hampton, VA	
"Burn On"	2006	Béla Fleck	Sail Away: The Songs of Randy Newman	
"People Watchin'"	2007	Keller Williams	Dream	
—N/a	2008	Jeff Coffin	Mutopia	
"Trade Winds"	2008	McCoy Tyner	Guitars	
"Amberjack"	2008	McCoy Tyner	Guitars	
"My Favorite Things"	2008	McCoy Tyner	Guitars	
—N/a	2009	Bryan Sutton and Friends	Almost Live	
"If Looks Could Kill"	2011	Bootsy Collins (featuring Zionplanet-10, Dennis Chambers, and Béla Fleck)	Tha Funk Capital of the World	
"Midnight Moonlight"	2013	Jerry Garcia Band (featuring Béla Fleck)	Garcia Live Volume Two	
"The Harder They Come"	2013	Jerry Garcia Band (featuring Béla Fleck)	Garcia Live Volume Two	
"Heart of the Dreamer"	2015	Steve Martin and Edie Brickell	So Familiar	
"Focus Poem"	2018	Jonathan Scales	Pillar	
"No Fear"	2019	Grégoire Maret and Edmar Castañeda (featuring Béla Fleck)	Harp vs. Harp	
"Santa Morena"	2019	Grégoire Maret and Edmar Castañeda (featuring Béla Fleck)	Harp vs. Harp	
—N/a	2019	Roger Burn	Trilogy (A Tribute To Roger Burn & Shapes)	
"Line and Lure"	2022	Cory Wong (featuring Béla Fleck)	Power Station	
"Pebbles"	2022	Cory Wong (featuring Béla Fleck)	Power Station	
"Brown Ferry Blues	2024	Terry Trischka (featuring Billy Strings)	Earl Jam: A Tribute to Earl Scruggs	
"—" denotes he wasn't on one song, but an entire album.
