= Gary Hoffman (cellist) =

Canadian and American cellist (born 1956)

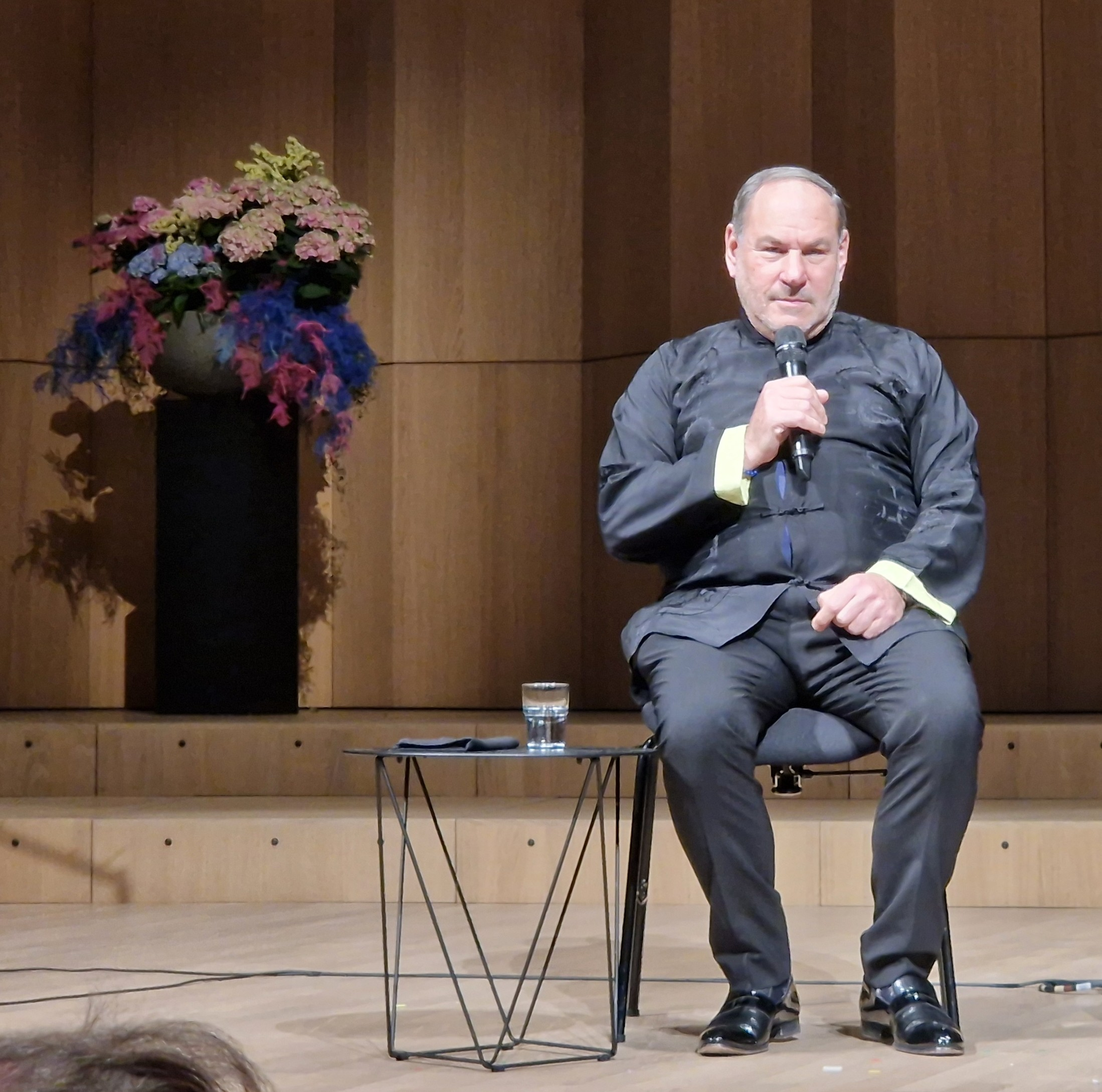
- Hoffman interviewed before a festival concert at the Casals Forum, May 2026
- Born: 1956 (age 69–70); Vancouver, British Columbia, Canada
- Occupations: Cellist; Academic teacher
- Organizations: Indiana University School of Music; Queen Elisabeth Music Chapel; Curtis Institute of Music; Kronberg Academy
- Website: www.gary-hoffman.com

Gary Hoffman (born 1956) is a Canadian and American cellist and academic teacher. A member of the Hoffman family of musicians, he is the son of conductor Irwin Hoffman and concert violinist Esther Glazer. He began performing as a child, making his concert debut with the Chicago Symphony Orchestra in 1968 and his recital debut at Wigmore Hall in London in 1971. As a teenager he was a member of the Florida Gulf Coast Symphony and also performed with the orchestra as a soloist. In Florida he performed with his siblings and parents in the Hoffman String Quartet and the Hoffmann Family Players in the 1970s and 1980s.

In 1978 Hoffman graduated from the Indiana University School of Music (IUSM), and subsequently was a professor of cello at the IUSM from 1978 to 1985. In 1986 he became the first American to win the Rostropovich International Competition in Paris. After this, he maintained an international career, both as a soloist and a chamber musician. He has performed world premieres of cello concertos by multiple composers. He plays a cello built in 1662 by Nicolo Amati; it was previously played by Leonard Rose. He has made several recordings, including playing cello on the Grammy Award winning album Perpetual Motion (2001).

Hoffman holds a chair for cello at the Curtis Institute of Music in Philadelphia, Pennsylvania, and also teaches at the Queen Elisabeth Music Chapel in Brussels and the Kronberg Academy.

== Early life in Vancouver and Chicago ==
Gary Hoffman was born in Vancouver, Canada, in 1956. His father, Irwin Hoffman, was a conductor, and his mother, Esther Glazer, was a concert violinist. His parents met and married while students at the Juilliard School. Gary was the second eldest of four children in the Hoffman family, all of whom studied music seriously from a young age. His younger sister, Deborah Hoffman, served as principal harpist of the Metropolitan Opera until her death in 2014.

The Hoffmann family lived in Vancouver where Irwin was conductor of the Vancouver Symphony Orchestra. The family relocated to Chicago in April 1964 when Irwin was appointed assistant conductor of the Chicago Symphony Orchestra (CSO). Gary's father concurrently worked as the conductor of the Grant Park Symphony Orchestra. Gary began formal music lessons with his parent at age four and began studying outside the home at age six. He originally studied the violin, but switched to cello at the age of nine. His first cello teacher was his aunt, who played the instrument professionally in the CSO. He subsequently studied cello privately in Chicago with Karl Fruh.

Gary performed in chamber music concerts with his mother and his older brother, the pianist and composer Joel Hoffman, during his youth. At age 11, he won second prize in the CSO's youth auditions, earning a contract to play with the symphony in its Youth Concert series. He performed Gabriel Fauré's Élégie with the CSO in February 1968, and the following year appeared on the local Chicago television program Artist's Showcase.

== Life in Florida ==
By the late 1960s, Irwin Hoffman was serving as conductor of the Florida Gulf Coast Symphony (FGCS) while still working in Chicago, spending three months each year in Florida leading the orchestra. The Hoffman family relocated to Florida, where Gary attended St. Petersburg High School and graduated in 1974. In 1970, Gary played Saint-Saëns' Cello Concerto No. 1 for his first appearance with the FGCS with his father as the conductor. He later joined the FGCS cello section and also worked as a soloist with the FGCS in performances of Tchaikovsky's Variations on a Rococo Theme (1972), the Dvořák Cello Concerto (1976), and Beethoven's Triple Concerto (1977, with his mother and brother Joel).

Gary played his first public recital in 1971 at Wigmore Hall in London at the age of 15 with pianist Martin Jones. Around this time, he also performed as a soloist with the BBC National Orchestra of Wales, an orchestra his father had guest conducted for multiple concerts in October of that same year. By 1972, Gary was playing in public concerts in the Hoffmann Quartet, a string quartet whose members included his mother and his younger brother Toby as the group's violinists. The group performed the North American premiere of his brother Joel's String Quartet No. 1 in 1973 at the University of Tampa (UT). Gary would also periodically perform in public chamber music concerts with family members billed as the Hoffmann Family Players in the 1970s.

Gary performed in the first concert offered by the newly formed early music ensemble, the Baroque Consortium, in December 1972. The group was in residence at the UT. In March 1973, he played the Lalo Cello Concerto with the Brevard Symphony Orchestra. By the time he completed high school he had appeared as a soloist with the Chicago Civic Symphony and the Belgian Radio Chamber Orchestra. He began further studies in the cello with Mstislav Rostropovich in Montreal in March 1972, traveling for an intensive short window of instruction. As a teenager, he also studied cello privately with Janos Starker, commuting by plane once a month to attend lessons at the Indiana University School of Music (IUSM) in Bloomington, where Starker was a faculty member.

== Indiana University School of Music ==
After high school, Hoffman enrolled as an undergraduate at IUSM in the fall of 1974, where he continued his cello studies with Starker. In March 1976, he traveled with a group from IUSM to the Kennedy Center in Washington D.C. where he performed David Baker's "Sonata for cello and piano" with pianist Shigeo Neriki. In 1977 he performed the world premiere of Miklós Rózsa's Toccata Capricciosa at IU's Conference on Film Study. While an IU student he competed in several music competitions. He won first prize in the Rossana M. Enlow Young Artist Awards competition in April 1978, earning him a cash prize and a contract for a solo engagement with the Evansville Philharmonic Orchestra (EPO). He played the Schumann Cello Concerto with the EPO in December 1978.

Hoffman made it to the final round of the International Tchaikovsky Competition in June 1978 and received an honorary diploma. He won the strings division of the Montreal Symphony Orchestra (MSO) music competition in November 1978. This led to his performance of Haydn's Cello Concerto No. 1 with the MSO and conductor Charles Dutoit in January 1979. Hoffman also won the Gregor Piatigorsky Competition (GPC) in April 1979 in New York City. He had previously studied in masterclasses with Piatigorsky prior to the cellist's death in 1976. The GPC prize included his New York recital debut at the 92nd Street Y in November 1979, which was favorably reviewed by Allen Hughes in The New York Times. In 1981, he was a finalist in the Naumburg Foundation competition.

By the fall of 1978, Hoffman was employed as Starker's teaching assistant at IUSM. Following his graduation in 1978, he became a professor of cello at IUSM beginning in the 1979–1980 academic year. At that time, he was the youngest faculty appointee in the school's history. He taught at the school until resigning his position at the end of the 1984–1985 academic year. He performed the Brahms Double Concerto with violinist Yuval Yaron, conductor Thomas Baldner, and the Indiana University Philharmonic Orchestra on tour to New York's Avery Fisher Hall in 1981. The next year, he was joined by his brother Joel for a faculty recital at IUSM.

While teaching at IUSM, Hoffman maintained a concert career. He continued to perform periodically in Florida with the Hoffman Quartet which by January 1980 encompassed his mother as first violinist, his father (new to the group) as second violinist, his brother Toby as violist (previously violin), and Gary as cellist. The Hoffmann family later gave a concert tour to Canada in 1982. He also performed briefly as a member of the American String Quartet with whom he toured to Taiwan and Hong Kong in 1980. In March 1980 he performed in the world premiere of David Baker's "Concerto for Fours" given at the University of Cincinnati with flutist James Pellerite, double bassist Barry Green, and tubist Michael Lind. In November 1980 Hoffman performed on tour with pianist András Schiff and violinist Hiroko Yajima at the Marlboro Music Festival in Connecticut, the Walnut Street Theatre in Philadelphia, and Alice Tully Hall in New York in performances of Haydn's Piano Trio No. 41 and Smetana's Piano Trio in G minor.

In 1982 Hoffman performed as a member of chamber group I Limoli Musicisti at the Cleveland Museum of Art. In 1984 he played at the American Cello Congress in a concert presented in memory of Gregor Piatigorsky at Gammage Memorial Auditorium. Some of the ensembles he performed with as a soloist included the Edmonton Symphony Orchestra (1980), the Bloomington Symphony Orchestra (1980), the Baltimore Symphony Orchestra (1980), the Toronto Symphony Orchestra (1980, with Kazuhiro Koizumi; 1981, with Calvin Simmons; and 1984, with Andrew Davis), Norwalk Symphony Orchestra (1981), the Springfield Symphony Orchestra (1981), the Jackson Symphony Orchestra (1981), the San Antonio Chamber Players (1982), the Saskatoon Symphony Orchestra (1982), the National Arts Centre Orchestra (1982), the Missoula Symphony Orchestra (1983), the Ravinia Festival (1983, with Chicago Symphony Orchestra), the Oakland Symphony (1983), and the Oklahoma Symphony Orchestra (1984).

== Later career ==
In his early concert career Hoffmann played on a cello made by David Tecchler in 1722 which he owned. In 1985 he began playing on a 1662 cello made by Nicolo Amati known as the "ex-Leonard Rose". This instrument was played by Rose until his death in 1984, and was subsequently loaned exclusively to Hoffmann for use by Rose's widow. He ultimately became the owner of the instrument.

In 1985 Hoffman moved to New York City after leaving the IUSM. In 1986 he became the first American to win the Rostropovich International Competition in Paris. After this he made an international career both as a soloist and in chamber music. In 1987 he returned to the Ravinia Festival to perform William Bolcom's Fantasia Concertante with the CSO led by James Levine, and that same year performed Shostakovich's Cello Concerto No. 2 with the London Symphony Orchestra at the Barbican Centre. In 1988 he was a soloist with the Jerusalem Symphony Orchestra led by John Nelson.

In 1990 Hoffman moved to Paris, France. In the 1990s he appeared as a soloist with the English Chamber Orchestra, the Orchestre National de France, and the Rotterdam Philharmonic Orchestra. In 1991 he performed the Brahms Double Concerto with violinist Robert McDuffie and the San Francisco Symphony led by Herbert Blomstedt. That same year he performed the Elgar Cello Concerto with the National Symphony Orchestra led by André Previn at the Kennedy Center. In 1992 he performed with Previn as pianist and the Orchestra of St. Luke's at the Caramoor Summer Music Festival, and performed in concerts with Luis Antonio García Navarro and the Barcelona Symphony Orchestra. He played the world premiere of Laurent Petitgirard's Cello Concerto at the Salle Pleyel in 1994, with the composer conducting his Orchestre symphonique français.

In 1998 he performed an all-Mozart program with the Baltimore Symphony Orchestra led by Pinchas Zukerman. In 1999 he returned to Indiana University to perform with the school's orchestra in a concert honoring the 75th birthday of his teacher, Janos Starker, that was conducted by Mstislav Rostropovich. Other orchestras he has performed with include the Los Angeles Chamber Orchestra, Orchestre de la Suisse Romande, Cleveland Philharmonic Orchestra, the Moscow Chamber Orchestra, and the Philadelphia Orchestra. He has also worked with conductors Jesús López Cobos and Kent Nagano.

In 2002 Hoffman was the soloist in the premiere of Graciane Finzi's Errance dans la Nuit for cello and orchestra with the Orchestre philharmonique de Radio France conducted by Pascal Rophé. He played premieres of cello concertos by Renaud Gagneux and Gil Shohat. He performed the premiere of Dominique Lemaître's cello concerto 'Automne en Normandie' in Taipei. Hoffman also played the French premiere of Carter's Cello Concerto.

Hoffman became Maître en Résidence at Queen Elisabeth Music Chapel in Brussels in 2011. From 2021, he has held the Nina and Billy Albert chair at the Curtis Institute of Music in Philadelphia, succeeding Carter Brey, the principal cellist of the New York Philharmonic. He has held master classes internationally, including the Ravinia Festival, the Manchester International Cello Festival and the Mozarteum in Salzburg. He has been a visiting professor at the Kronberg Academy since 2008, involved in the master program and the festival.

In 2023, when playing Aulis Sallinen’s The Nocturnal Dances of Don Juan Quixote he drew "growing, violent tones from the cello", according to journalist David Fleshler.

== Recordings ==
Hoffman played cello on Béla Fleck and Edgar Meyer's album Perpetual Motion (2001) which won the Grammy Award for Best Classical Crossover Album. He recorded Petitgirard's Cello Concerto for Naxos in 2007, with the composer conducting the Monte-Carlo Philharmonic Orchestra. He recorded all works by Beethoven for cello and piano, five cello sonatas and three sets of variations, with David Selig in 2023. A reviewer for Gramophone noted the cellists' "full-bodied" but refined playing, their "keen and alert" approach to the music and their "innate and intimate musicality".
