= Daybreak (Béla Fleck album) =

Compilation album by Béla Fleck
- Released: 1987
- Genre: Americana, bluegrass, folk
- Length: 64:37
- Label: Rounder
- Producer: Béla Fleck

Béla Fleck chronology
Inroads (1986)	Daybreak (1987)	Drive (1988)

Professional ratings
Review scores
Source	Rating
Allmusic	4.5/5 stars

Daybreak is a compilation album by American banjoist Béla Fleck. His next compilation, Places which was released in 1988, Fleck continued to merge his bluegrass roots with forays into other genres, which turned into his Flecktones project in the 90's.

== Track listing ==
All tracks written by Béla Fleck; except where noted

1. "Texas Barbeque"
2. "Spain" (Chick Corea)
3. "Twilight"
4. "Reading in the Dark"
5. "Growling Old Man and the Grumbling Old Woman" (Traditional)
6. "How Can You Face Me Now" (Andy Razaf, Fats Waller)
7. "Bill Cheatham" (Traditional)
8. "Christina's Jig / Plain Brown Jig"
9. "Silverbell" (Traditional)
10. "Fiddler's Dream" (Traditional)
11. "Daybreak"
12. "Dawg's Due"
13. "Flexibility"
14. "Old Hickory Waltz"
15. "Crossfire"
16. "Applebutter"
17. "The Natural Bridge Suite"
18. "Punchdrunk"

== Personnel ==
- Béla Fleck - banjo, guitar
- Tony Trischka, Bill Keith - banjo (track 7)
- Russ Barenberg, Glenn Lawson, David Parmley - guitar
- Sam Bush, Randy Sabien - fiddle
- Mark O'Connor - fiddle, guitar, viola
- Darol Anger - fiddle, violectra
- Jerry Douglas, Stacy Philips - Dobro
- David Grisman, Jimmy Gaudreau, Jack Tottle - mandolin
- Paul Kahn, Mark Schatz - bass
- Pat Enright - vocals
