= Inroads (album) =

Studio album by Béla Fleck
- Released: 1986
- Studio: Nashville Sound Connection, Nashville, Tennessee
- Genre: Americana, bluegrass, folk
- Length: 38:01
- Label: Rounder
- Producer: Béla Fleck

Béla Fleck chronology
Double Time (1984)	Inroads (1986)	Daybreak (1987)

Inroads is an album by American banjoist Béla Fleck, released in 1986.

Professional ratings
Review scores
Source	Rating
Allmusic	3/5 stars

== Track listing ==
All tracks written by Béla Fleck

1. "Toninio" – 4:09
2. "Somerset" – 3:09
3. "Cecata" – 0:55
4. "Four Wheel Drive" – 3:53
5. "Ireland" – 6:48
6. "Perplexed" – 6:21
7. "The Old Country" – 2:58
8. "Hudson's Bay" – 5:22
9. "Close to Home" – 4:02

The string chart on "The Old Country" was composed by Edgar Meyer. "Cecata" was a group improvisation. Kirby Shelstad's intro to "Perplexed" was also improvised.

== Personnel ==
- Béla Fleck - banjo
- Timothy Britton - Uilleann pipes
- Sam Bush - mandolin
- John Cowan - bass
- Jerry Douglas - dobro
- Connie Heard - violin on "The Old Country"
- Kenny Malone - drums
- Edgar Meyer - bass
- Mark O'Connor - violin
- Tom Roady - percussion
- Mark Schatz - bass
- Kirby Shelstad - drums, vibraphone on "Close to Home"
- Recorded and mixed by Bil VornDick
