= Grammy Award for Best Classical Crossover Album =

Music award category

The Grammy Award for Best Classical Crossover Album was awarded from 1999 to 2011.

The award was discontinued from 2012 in a major overhaul of Grammy categories. In the present day, if a classical crossover release is a non-classical artist making a classical album it should be entered in the appropriate classical category. If the release is a classical artist making a non-classical album it should be entered in the appropriate genre category (Pop, New Age, Jazz, etc.)

Years reflect the year in which the Grammy Awards were presented, for works released in the previous year.

== Recipients ==
Year	Winner(s)	Title	Nominees	Ref.
1999	Jorge Calandrelli (conductor), Yo-Yo Ma	Soul of the Tango - The Music of Ástor Piazzola	Keith Lockhart (conductor), The Boston Pipers Society, Eileen Ivers, Joanie Madden, Jerry O'Sullivan, various artists for The Celtic Album; John Williams (conductor), Joshua Bell, London Symphony Orchestra for Gershwin Fantasy; Sharon Isbin, Thiago de Mello, Paul Winter for Journey to the Amazon (Works of Almeida, Barrios, Brower, Etc.); James Watson (conductor), Evelyn Glennie for Reflected in Brass - Evelyn Glennie Meets the Black Dyke Band	
2000	Chestnut Brass Company, Peter Schickele	Schickele: Hornsmoke (Piano Concerto No. 2 in F Major "Ole"; Brass Calendar; Hornsmoke - A Horse Opera)	Buryl Red (conductor), Joseph Joubert, Charlie McCoy, the Century Man, various artists for Beautiful Star - A Celebration of Christmas (O Holy Night; Wexford Carol; This Little Babe, Etc.); Vance George (conductor), John Fenstermaker, Marc Shapiro, San Francisco Symphony Chorus for Christmas by the Bay (The First Nowell; Rejoice, O Virgin; Ave Maria, Etc.); Paul Daniel (conductor), Bryn Terfel, Chorus of Opera North; English Northern Philharmonic for If Ever I Would Leave You - The Songs of Alan Jay Lerner; Joshua Bell, Sam Bush, Mike Marshall, Edgar Meyer for Meyer: Short Trip Home (In the Nickn of Time; BP; Concert Duo, The Prequel, Etc.); The Canadian Brass for Tale the "A" Train - Canadian Brass Play the Music of Duke Ellington (It Don't Mean a Thing; Echoes of Harlem; Solitude, Etc.)	
2001	Steven Epstein (producer), Richard King (engineer), Yo-Yo Ma, Edgar Meyer, Mark O'Connor	Appalachian Journey	The King's Singers for Circle of Life (Kiss from a Rose; Kokomo; It Had to be You; Etc.); Chick Corea (conductor), Steven Mercurio, various artists, London Philharmonic Orchestra for Corea Concerto ('Spain' for Sextet & Orchestra; Piano Concerto No. 1); Dave Grusin, Lee Ritenour, Gil Shaham, Renee Fleming, Julian Lloyd Webber, various artists for Two Worlds (Works of Bach, Villa-Lobos, Torroba, Etc.); Bryn Terfel, Bryan Davies, The Black Mountain Chorus, Risca Male Chorus, Gareth Jones, Orchestra of Welsh National Opera for We'll Keep a Welcome - The Welsh Album (Land of My Fathers; David of the White Rock; Men of Harlech, Etc.)	
2002	Edgar Meyer (producer), Robert Battaglia (engineer), Béla Fleck, Joshua Bell, Evelyn Glennie, Gary Hoffman, Edgar Meyer, Chris Thile, John Williams	Perpetual Motion	David Zinman (conductor), Joshua Bell, Philadelphia Orchestra for Bernstein: West Side Story Suite; Jonathan Sheffer (conductor), Eos Orchestra for Celluloid Copland (From Sorcery to Science; The City-Suite; The North Star-Suite, Etc.); Bernd Ruf, (conductor), Paquito D'Rivera, Pablo Zinger, various artists, European Art Orchestra for The Clarinetist Volume One; Tim Devine, Alfreado Munar, Jose Ramon Urbay (conductors),[Enrique Chía, Bruce Wethey, Serenade Ensemble for La Musica de Ernesto Lecuona (Siboney; Recordar; María La O, Etc.)	
2003	Sid McLaughlan (producer), Richard Lancaster, Ulrich Vette (engineers), André Previn (conductor), London Symphony Orchestra	Previn Conducts Korngold (Sea Hawk; Captain Blood; Etc.)	Allison Brewster Franzetti, Carlos Franzetti, Nestor Marconi, Buenos Aires Tango Orchestra for Franzetti: Poeta de Arrabal - Tango Ballet (Plaza Oscura; Virgilio, Etc.); Los Angeles Guitar Quartet for LAGQ Latin (Fragile; Hasta Alicia Baila; La Trampa, Etc.); Ian Bostridge, Sophie Daneman, Jeffrey Tate for The Noel Coward Songbook (Parisian Pierrot; World Weary, Etc.); Kronos Quartet for Nuevo (El Sinaloense; Mini Skirt; Perfidia, Etc.); Gary Burton, Makoto Ozone for Virtuosi (Ravel, Barber, Rachmaninoff, Etc.)	
2004	Jorge Calandrelli (conductor), Yo-Yo Ma, various artists	Obrigado Brazil	Kronos Quartet, The Tiger Lillies for The Gorey End; Joel McNeely (conductor) for Herrmann: The Day the Earth Stood Still; Ali Jackson, Emmanuel Pahud, Sean Smith, Jacky Terrasson for Into the Blue; Joseph Jennings (conductor), Chanticleer for Our American Journey	
2005	Los Angeles Guitar Quartet	LAGQ's Guitar Heroes	Cuba Percussion, Klazz Brothers for Classic Meets Cuba (Mombozart; Preludio; Guten Abend, Etc.); Daniel Hope, various artists for East Meets West (Shankar, Ravel, Falla, Bartók, Etc.); William Stromberg (conductor), Moscow Symphony Orchestra for Korngold: The Adventures of Robin Hood; Hugh Wolff (conductor), Peter Erskine, John Patitucci, John Scofield, Radiosinfonieorchester Frankfurt, HR Big Band for Turnage-Scofield: Scorched	
2006	Turtle Island String Quartet, Ying Quartet	4 + Four	Imani Winds for The Classical Underground; Paquito D'Rivera, Jazz Chamber Trio for The Jazz Chamber Trio; Roberto Minczuk (conductor), Orquestra Sinfônica Do Estado de São Paulo for Jobim: Symphonic Jobim; William Stromberg (conductor), Moscow Symphony Orchestra for Steiner: The Adventures of Mark Twain	
2007	Bryn Terfel, London Voices, London Symphony Orchestra	Simple Gifts	Rumon Gamba (conductor), BBC Philharmonic for The Film Music of Erich Wolfgang Korngold; David Lockington (conductor), Deborah Henson-Conant, Grand Rapids Symphony for Invention & Alchemy; Quartet San Francisco, John Santos for Látigo; Song Zu Ying, China National Symphony Orchestra for Song Zu Ying: The Diva Goes to the Movies	
2008	Turtle Island String Quartet	A Love Supreme: The Legacy of John Coltrane	Thomas Quasthoff for The Jazz Album - Watch What Happens; Craig Jessop, Mack Wilberg (conductors), Mormon Tabernacle Choir, Orchestra at Temple Square for Spirit of the Season; Quartet San Francisco for Whirled Chamber Music; Brian Setzer, the Brian Setzer Orchestra for Wolfgang's Big Night Our	
2009	Gregg Jackman	Simple Gifts	Gabriela Montero for Baroque; Ronn McFarlane for Indigo Road; East Village Opera Company for Olde School; Uri Caine Ensemble for The Othello Symdrome	
2010	Yo-Yo Ma, various artists	Yo-Yo Ma & Friends: Songs of Joy and Peace	Craig Hella Johnson (conductor), Conspirare for A Company of Voices: Conspirare in Concert; Paquito D'Rivera Quintet for Jazz-Clazz; Leonard Slatkin (conductor), Béla Fleck, Zakir Hussain, Edgar Meyer, Detroit Symphony Orchestra for The Melody of Rhythm; Quartet San Francisco for QSF Plays Brubeck; Theo Bleckmann, Kneebody for Twelve Songs by Charles Ives	
2011	Christopher Tin, Lucas Richman (conductors), various artists, Royal Philharmonic Orchestra	Tin, Christopher: Calling All Dawns	Matt Haimovitz, various artists for Meeting of the Spirits; The Silk Road Ensemble for Off the Map; Jessye Norman, various artists for Roots - My Life, My Song; Bobby McFerrin for Vocabularies	
