= Tales from the Acoustic Planet =

Tales From The Acoustic Planet

Studio album by Béla Fleck
- Released: 1995
- Genre: Jazz, Bluegrass
- Length: 58:55
- Label: Warner Bros.

Béla Fleck chronology
Places (1988)	Tales From The Acoustic Planet (1995)	Tabula Rasā (1996)

Professional ratings
Review scores
Source	Rating
AllMusic	4/5 stars

Tales From The Acoustic Planet is an album by American banjoist Béla Fleck. It is a jazzy album with roots in bluegrass, where Fleck is joined by bluegrass stars (Sam Bush, Tony Rice, Jerry Douglas), as well as his jazz friends (Chick Corea, Branford Marsalis, Paul McCandless) and Flecktones members (Victor Wooten, Future Man). This is also his first solo album since 1988's Places.

== Track listing ==
All tracks written by Béla Fleck except where noted.

1. Up And Running
2. First Light
3. The Great Circle Route
4. Circus Of Regrets
5. Three Bridges Home
6. The Landing
7. Arkansas Traveler (trad.)
8. Backwoods Galaxy
9. In Your Eyes
10. System Seven
11. Cheeseballs In Cowtown
12. Bicyclops
13. Jayme Lynn
14. For Sascha

== Personnel ==
- Béla Fleck - banjo (all tracks)
- Grace Bahng - cello (track 13)
- Sam Bush - mandolin (tracks 10, 11)
- Chick Corea - piano (tracks 8, 9, 12)
- Jerry Douglas - Dobro (tracks 2, 3, 11)
- Stuart Duncan - violin (tracks 3, 6, 10, 11)
- Robert Barry Green - trombone (track 4)
- Connie Heard - violin (track 13)
- Bruce Hornsby - piano (track 3)
- Kenny Malone - drums (tracks 7, 11), percussion (track 10)
- Branford Marsalis - soprano saxophone (track 14), tenor saxophone (track 8)
- Edgar Meyer - upright bass (tracks 2, 4, 6, 7, 9, 10, 13, 14), piano (track 4)
- Paul McCandless - bass clarinet (track 1), English horn (track 5), oboe (tracks 2, 5, 13), soprano saxophone (track 1)
- Matt Mundy - mandolin (tracks 1, 6, 13)
- Tony Rice - guitar (tracks 1, 3, 5, 6)
- Dennis Solee - clarinet (track 4)
- George Tidwell - trumpet (track 4)
- Mary Kathryn Vanosdale - violin (track 13)
- Kristin Wilkinson - viola (track 13)
- Roy "Futureman" Wooten - acoustic percussion (tracks 1, 3, 4, 6, 13), drums (tracks 5, 8), vocal wind effects (track 4)
- Victor Wooten - Bass guitar (tracks 1, 5), fretless bass guitar (tracks 3, 8, 11), Electric upright bass (track 4)
- Recorded and mixed by Bil VornDick
