= Bach: Unaccompanied Cello Suites Performed on Double Bass =

Bach: Unaccompanied Cello Suites Performed on Double Bass is an album released by the double bass virtuoso Edgar Meyer. Meyer plays three of JS Bach's Cello Suites BWV 1007-1012. Performing cello suites on a double bass offers intriguing challenges. Meyer recorded Suites I, II and V. There also are recordings of all six Suites by Richard Hartshorne (on Centaur), Gerd Reinke (on rclcds) and François Rabbath (on Solstice). Gary Karr recorded Suites IV, V and VI (on Lemur Music).

== Discography ==
Bach: Unaccompanied Cello Suites Performed on Double Bass

Studio album by Edgar Meyer
- Released: 2000
- Genre: Baroque music
- Length: 1:01:03
- Label: Sony Classical
- Producer: Steven Epstein

Edgar Meyer chronology
Appalachian Journey (2000)	Bach: Unaccompanied Cello Suites Performed on Double Bass (2000)	Meyer and Bottesini Concertos (2002)

1. Suite for Solo Cello No. 2 in D Minor, BWV 1008
  1. Prelude - 4:05
  2. Allemande - 3:47
  3. Courante - 2:09
  4. Sarabande - 4:24
  5. Menuette 1 & 2 - 3:15
  6. Gigue - 2:43
2. Suite for Solo Cello No. 1 in G Major, BWV 1007
  1. Prelude - 2:28
  2. Allemande - 4:28
  3. Courante - 2:12
  4. Sarabande - 2:30
  5. Menuette 1 & 2 - 4:01
  6. Gigue - 1:39
3. Suite for Solo Cello No. 5 in C Minor, BWV 1011
  1. Prelude - 5:49
  2. Allemande - 5:01
  3. Courante - 2:10
  4. Sarabande - 3:55
  5. Gavotte 1 & 2 - 4:17
  6. Gigue - 2:10
