= Music for Two =

Music For Two

Live album by Béla Fleck and Edgar Meyer
- Released: May 27, 2004
- Recorded: October 2001 to September 2003
- Genre: Classical crossover/Chamber jazz
- Length: 74:01
- Label: Sony Classical
- Producer: Béla Fleck, Edgar Meyer

Béla Fleck chronology
Perpetual Motion (2001)	Music For Two (2004)	The Enchantment (2007)

Professional ratings
Review scores
Source	Rating
Allmusic	4/5 stars

Music for Two is an album of duets by Edgar Meyer and Béla Fleck created and recorded while touring to support Perpetual Motion and released by Sony Classical in 2004. Most of the pieces are original compositions by Meyer and Fleck, working alone and together. They also perform four of their arrangements of music by J. S. Bach, an arrangement of a sonata by Henry Eccles, and piece by Miles Davis.

The album includes a bonus DVD with a video documentary of the making of Music For Two from footage taken by Fleck's brother Sascha Paladino and concert footage.

== Track listing ==
1. "Bug Tussle" (Béla Fleck)
2. "Invention No. 10" BWV 796 (Johann Sebastian Bach - arr: Fleck, Edgar Meyer)
3. "Pile-up" (Fleck, Meyer)
4. Prelude No. 24 BWV 869 from The Well-Tempered Clavier, Book I (Johann Sebastian Bach - arr: Fleck, Meyer)
5. "Solar" (Miles Davis)
6. "Blue Spruce" (Fleck)
7. "Canon" (Meyer)
8. "The One I Left Behind" (Fleck)
9. Menuett I-II from Partia No. 1 BWV 825 (Johann Sebastian Bach - arr: Fleck, Meyer)
10. Prelude No. 2 BWV 847 from The Well-Tempered Clavier, Book I (Johann Sebastian Bach - arr: Fleck, Meyer)
11. "Palmyra" (Fleck, Meyer)
12. "The Lake Effect" (Fleck)
13. Largo from Sonata (Henry Eccles - arr: Meyer)
14. Allegro Vivace from Sonata (Henry Eccles - arr: Meyer)
15. "Wrong Number" (Fleck, Meyer)
16. "Woolly Mammoth" (Fleck, Meyer)
17. "Wishful Thinking" (Meyer)

== Personnel ==
- Béla Fleck – banjo, guitar
- Edgar Meyer – double bass, piano

== Chart ==
Chart	Peak position
U.S. Billboard Top Classical Crossover	3
