= Chestnut Brass Company =

American brass quintet

The Chestnut Brass Company is a Philadelphia brass quintet founded in 1977. Since beginning as a street band, they have performed in North and South America, Europe, the Caribbean, and Asia. In 2000, the band won their first Grammy award for Best Classical Crossover Album.

== Background ==
The Chestnut Brass Company was organized as a street band in 1977. The chamber ensemble is active in the performance and commissioning of contemporary music, and has introduced numerous new works to audiences around the country. Composers who have written works for the Chestnut Brass Company, or have been commissioned by the Chestnut Brass Company, include Jan Krzywicki, Pulitzer Prize–winning composer Richard Wernick, Lois V. Vierk, Peter Schickele, George Hitt, Eric Stokes, Theodore Antoniou, Lawrence Siegel, and Paul Basler. The CBC has received awards for commissioning and performance from the NEA, the Pennsylvania Council on the Arts, the Pew Charitable Trust, the Presser Foundation, Chamber Music America and Meet the Composer.

In 2000, the ensemble won a Grammy award for Best Classical Crossover Album for the performance of Schickele: Hornsmoke (Piano Concerto No. 2 in F Major "Ole"); Brass Calendar; Hornsmoke - A Horse Opera.

Interviews and recitals of the Chestnut Brass Company have been featured on National Public Radio's All Things Considered, Fresh Air, Radiotimes and Performance Today programs; Voice of America, Radio Free Europe, Bavarian State Radio and numerous radio and television stations across the United States. The Chestnut Brass Company has been featured in performance at the Juilliard School, the Chautauqua Institute, the Ambassador Series of Los Angeles, the Boston Museum of Art, Merkin Concert Hall, Alice Tully Hall and the Yale Collection of Instruments. As curators of the sounds of ancient and antique brasses, the Chestnut Brass Company have been at the forefront of the period-instrument revival with performances on cornetti, sackbuts, keyed bugles and saxhorns. The quintet continues to collect antique brass instruments and to research the literature and performance practice of these instruments.

Their educational program Hot Air: the Story of Brass Instruments was one of three programs selected by the Kennedy Center for the Arts for a live web broadcast. The program was renewed for inclusion on the Kennedy Center website. The CBC can be heard on the Sony, Newport Classic, Crystal and Musical Heritage/Musicmasters labels. Selections from CBC recordings have been included on several documentaries ranging from A House Divided for PBS, to Pinehurst, the History of Golf.

- Bruce Barrie, trumpet;
- John Charles Thomas, trumpet;
- Marian Hesse, horn;
- Larry Zimmerman, trombone;
- Jay Krush, tuba

The ensemble's song, "Gentle Annie" featured in the television show Killing Eve.
