= The Enchantment =

Studio album by Chick Corea and Bela Fleck
- Released: May 22, 2007
- Recorded: December 2006
- Genre: Jazz
- Label: Concord
- Producer: Chick Corea & Béla Fleck

Chick Corea chronology
The Boston Three Party (2007)	The Enchantment (2007)	Dr. Joe (2007)

Béla Fleck chronology
Music for Two (2004)	The Enchantment (2007)	Abigail Washburn & The Sparrow Quartet (2008)

Professional ratings
Review scores
Source	Rating
Allmusic	3.5/5 stars
The Penguin Guide to Jazz Recordings	3/4 stars

The Enchantment is a 2007 album released on the Concord label by pianist Chick Corea and banjoist Béla Fleck.

The album was released to favorable reviews and went on to win the Latin Grammy Award for Best Instrumental Album at the 8th Annual Latin Grammy Awards. Fleck was also nominated that year for a Grammy Award for the song "Spectacle" in the Best Instrumental Composition category. The album peaked at number six on the Billboard Top Jazz albums chart.

== Track listing ==
All tracks written by either Chick Corea or Béla Fleck, except where noted.

1. "Señorita" (Chick Corea) – 5:20
2. "Spectacle" (Bela Fleck) – 4:40
3. "Joban Dna Nopia" (Corea) – 6:28
4. "Mountain" (Fleck) – 3:53
5. "Children’s Song #6" (Corea) – 4:02
6. "A Strange Romance" (Fleck) – 4:46
7. "Menagerie" (Fleck) – 5:53
8. "Waltse for Abby" (Fleck)– 3:02
9. "Brazil" (Ary Barroso, Sidney Russell) – 5:58
10. "The Enchantment" (Corea) – 5:39
11. "Sunset Road" (Fleck) – 4:36

== Personnel ==
=== Musicians ===
- Chick Corea – piano
- Béla Fleck – banjo

=== Production ===
- Bernard Alexander – Piano Tuner
- Brian Alexander – Piano Technician
- Marc Bessant – Design
- Jay Blakesberg – Photography
- Evelyn Brechtlein – Project Coordinator
- Sarah Jane Coleman – Lettering
- C. Taylor Crothers – Photography
- Bernie Grundman – Mastering
- Bernie Kirsh – Engineer, Mixing
- Julie Rooney – Graphic Consultant
- Buck Snow – Assistant Engineer

== Charts ==
Chart (2007)	Peak position
US Billboard Top Jazz Albums	6
