= Edgar Meyer (album) =

Studio album by Edgar Meyer
- Released: April 25, 2006
- Recorded: August 2004 – June 2005
- Genre: Classical
- Label: Sony Classical
- Producer: Edgar Meyer

Edgar Meyer chronology
Meyer and Bottesini Concertos (2002)	Edgar Meyer (2006)	Edgar Meyer and Chris Thile (2008)

Professional ratings
Review scores
Source	Rating
Allmusic	3/5 stars

Edgar Meyer is a 2006 solo album from the artist of the same name. Unlike Meyer's other albums, Meyer is the only musician on this album, accompanying himself on double-bass, piano, mandolin, dobro, guitar and gamba. It was released on Sony Classical.

== Track listing ==
All tracks recorded and composed by Meyer.

1. First Things First - 3:37
2. Roundabout - 6:16
3. Interlude One - 0:58
4. Please Don't Feed the Bear 4:06
5. Whatever - 8:52
6. In Hindsight - 6:06
7. Interlude Two - 0:46
8. The Low Road - 2:27
9. Just As I Thought - 4:29
10. Catch And Release - 6:54
11. Interlude Three - 0:58
12. Woody Creek - 4:09
13. Degrees of Separation - 3:36
14. Interlude Four - 0:56

== Personnel ==
- Edgar Meyer - Double-bass, piano, mandolin, dobro, guitar, gamba, producer
