= Places (Béla Fleck album) =

Compilation album by Béla Fleck
- Released: 1988
- Genre: Americana, bluegrass, folk
- Label: Rounder
- Producer: Béla Fleck

Béla Fleck chronology
Drive (1988)	Places (1988)	Tales from the Acoustic Planet (1995)

Professional ratings
Review scores
Source	Rating
Allmusic	3/5 stars

Places is a compilation album by American banjoist Béla Fleck, recorded in 1988. It marks Fleck's last record with Rounder Records, subsequent label change to Warner Bros. Records and soon birth of the Flecktones, who would release their debut album in 1990.

== Track listing ==
All tracks written by Béla Fleck except where noted

1. "Deviation" 04:22
2. "Reverie" 01:30
3. "Nuns For Nixon" 04:05
4. "Malone" (Kenny Malone) 01:08
5. "Moontides" 05:33
6. "Another Morning" 03:26
7. "Lowdown" 03:31
8. "The Bullfrog Shuffle" 01:32
9. "Places" 07:07
10. "Snakes Alive" 04:20
11. "Ladies And Gentleman" 02:20
12. "Light Speed" 02:28
13. "Ireland" 06:48
14. "Four Wheel Drive" 03:53
15. "Perplexed" 06:21
16. "The Old Country" 02:58
17. "Hudson's Bay" 05:22
18. "Close To Home" 04:02

== Personnel ==
- Béla Fleck - banjo
- Darol Anger - cello
- Sam Bush - mandolin
- John Cowan - bass
- Jerry Douglas - dobro
- Pat Enright - guitar
- Mark Hembree - bass
- Connie Heard - violin
- Kenny Malone - drums
- Mike Marshall - mandolin
- Edgar Meyer - bass
- Mark O'Connor - fiddle
- Tony Rice - guitar
- Mark Schatz - bass
