= Natural Bridge (album) =

Studio album by Béla Fleck
- Released: 1982
- Studio: 1750 Arch Studios, Berkeley, California; Bull Run Studios, Ashland, Tennessee
- Genre: Americana, Bluegrass, Jazz
- Length: 42:56
- Label: Rounder
- Producer: Béla Fleck

Béla Fleck chronology
Crossing the Tracks (1979)	Natural Bridge (1982)	Deviation (1984)

Professional ratings
Review scores
Source	Rating
Allmusic	3/5 stars

Natural Bridge is an album by American banjoist Béla Fleck, released in 1982. Bela Fleck was a young bluegrass musician whose work with such bands as Spectrum and the New Grass Revival pushed the envelope of bluegrass tradition and contributed to the development of the New Acoustic movement spearheaded by mandolinist David Grisman, guitarist Tony Rice, and others. Influenced by Bill Keith and Tony Trischka, he moved the banjo sound much further than anyone could imagine.

== Track listing ==
All tracks composed and arranged by Béla Fleck

1. "Punchdrunk" – 2:39
2. "Flexibility" – 4:11
3. "Dawg's Due" – 2:59
4. "Daybreak" – 3:00
5. "Bitter Gap" – 2:59
6. "October Winds" – 5:48
7. "Crossfire" – 3:26
8. "Applebutter" – 2:42
9. "Old Hickory Waltz" – 4:53
10. "Rocky Road" – 3:24
11. "The Natural Bridge Suite" – 6:55

== Personnel ==
- Béla Fleck – banjo
- Darol Anger - fiddle, violectra
- Sam Bush – fiddle
- Jerry Douglas - dobro
- Jimmy Gaudreau - mandolin
- David Grisman - mandolin
- Mike Marshall - mandolin
- Mark O'Connor - fiddle, 12-string guitar, viola
- David Parmley - guitar
- Mark Schatz - bass
- Ricky Skaggs - fiddle
- Buck White - mandolin

Technical

- Rich Adler, Robert Schumaker - engineer
- David Gahr - front cover photography
