= Crossing the Tracks =

Studio album by Béla Fleck
- Released: 1979
- Studio: The Mixing Lab, Newton, Massachusetts; Pete's Place, Nashville
- Genre: Americana, bluegrass, folk, jazz
- Label: Rounder
- Producer: Béla Fleck

Béla Fleck chronology
Crossing the Tracks (1979)	Natural Bridge (1982)

Crossing the Tracks is the first album by the American banjoist Béla Fleck, released in 1979.

== Reception ==
Professional ratings
Review scores
Source	Rating
AllMusic	4/5 stars
MusicHound Country	3/5 stars
The Rolling Stone Album Guide	4/5 stars
The Virgin Encyclopedia of Jazz	3/5 stars

Steve Leggett of AllMusic wrote: "Excellent mix between bluegrass and jazz, original songs and traditional pieces, all done with a bright and joyful élan, this album is a perfect springboard to his coming solo efforts."

Acoustic Music's Jim Zimmerschied called the album "a colossal collection of 5 string banjo tunes by one of the best players around," and stated: "Béla can play just about anything on the banjo... The assisting musicians are all giants in the bluegrass/acoustic music area... the whole album is enjoyable."

Writing for Country Standard Time, Rick Bell commented: "On the jacket of his 1979 solo debut... a 20-year-old Bela Fleck is laughing as if there's an inside joke no one else gets. Fleck... knew the punchline. With the release of this record some 26 years ago, Fleck's immense talent quickly became an inside joke no more."

== Track listing ==
1. "Dear Old Dixie" (Lester Flatt, Earl Scruggs) – 2:39
2. "Inman Square" (Fleck) – 4:00
3. "Texas Barbeque" (Fleck) – 3:59
4. "Growling Old Man and the Grumbling Old Woman" (Traditional; arranged by Fleck) – 1:41
5. "Spain" (Joaquín Rodrigo, Chick Corea) – 7:12
6. "Crossing The Tracks" (Fleck) – 3:38
7. "Spring Thaw" (Fleck) – 2:27
8. "How Can You Face Me Now" (Andy Razaf, Fats Waller) – 4:54
9. "Twilight" (Fleck) – 2:01
10. "Frosty Morning" (Traditional) – 2:58
11. "I Ain't Gonna Work Tomorrow" (Traditional) – 2:26

== Personnel ==
- Béla Fleck – banjo
- Bob Applebaum – mandolin
- Russ Barenberg – guitar
- Sam Bush – fiddle
- Mark Schatz – double bass

with:

- Jerry Douglas – dobro on "Dear Old Dixie" and "Spain"
- Pat Enright – vocals on "How Can You Face Me Now" and "Ain't Gonna Work Tomorrow"
- Randy Sabien - fiddle on "Twilight"
