= The Melody of Rhythm =

Melody of Rhythm

Studio album by Béla Fleck
- Released: August 25, 2009
- Genre: Classical, world music, jazz
- Label: Koch

Béla Fleck chronology
| Tales from the Acoustic Planet, Vol. 3: Africa Sessions (2009) | Melody of Rhythm (2009) | Throw Down Your Heart: Africa Sessions Part 2 (2010) |

Professional ratings
Review scores
| Source | Rating |
|---|---|
| Allmusic | 4/5 stars |

The Melody of Rhythm is a 2009 album by banjoist Béla Fleck. After returning from Africa and recording Tales From The Acoustic Planet, Vol. 3: Africa Sessions, Fleck put together the musical trio, consisting of him, tabla player Zakir Hussain and bassist Edgar Meyer to record this album. They are accompanied by the Detroit Symphony Orchestra, conducted by Leonard Slatkin.

== Track listing ==
1. "Bahar" (Hussain)
2. "Out of the Blue" (Fleck, Hussain, Meyer)
3. "Bubbles" (Fleck)
4. "The Melody of Rhythm: Movement 1" (Fleck, Hussain, Meyer)
5. "The Melody of Rhythm: Movement 2" (Fleck, Hussain, Meyer)
6. "The Melody of Rhythm: Movement 3" (Fleck, Hussain, Meyer)
7. "Cadence" (Fleck, Hussain, Meyer)
8. "In Conclusion" (Fleck, Hussain, Meyer)
9. "Then Again" (Meyer)

== Personnel ==
- Béla Fleck - banjo
- Zakir Hussain - Tabla
- Edgar Meyer - bass
- Detroit Symphony Orchestra
