= Jay Krush =

American musician

Jay Krush is a native of the Philadelphia area whose busy career includes performing, composing, arranging, teaching and conducting.

A founding member of the Grammy Award-winning Chestnut Brass Company, he has performed on tuba and historical brasses with that ensemble for twenty five years, touring to forty nine of the U.S. States and to Europe, South America, Asia, Canada and the Caribbean. He can be heard on recordings with the Chesntut Brass Company on the Sony Classical, Naxos, Newport Classic, Polygram, Albany, Musical Heritage Society and Crystal labels.

Mr. Krush is also a tubist with the Pennsylvania Ballet Orchestra and on the faculty of the Boyer College of Music at Temple University where he teaches tuba and euphonium and directs the Contemporary Music Ensemble.

As a composer he has written over seventy works, including two symphonies, for a wide variety of media and has received grants and awards from the National Endowment for the Arts, the Pennsylvania Council on the Arts, the American Composers Forum and others.

Krush holds a bachelor's degree in composition from the Eastman School of Music and a Master's in performance from Northwestern University, where he studied with the Chicago Symphony's Arnold Jacobs.
