= Joel Hoffman (composer) =

Joel Hoffman (born 1953 in Vancouver) is a Canadian-American composer of contemporary classical music and pianist living in New York, New York. Hoffman's music draws much of its richness and variety from such diverse sources as Eastern European folk musics, Chinese traditional music and American bebop, yet these sources seem to be seamlessly woven into a unique musical language that is pervaded by a sense of lyricism and rhythmic vitality.

== Biography ==
Hoffman is a son of conductor Irwin Hoffman and violinist Esther Glazer, and the brother of cellist Gary Hoffman. Hoffman earned his bachelor's degree from the University of Wales and a masters and doctorate from the Juilliard School. His teachers included Elliott Carter, Milton Babbitt, Vincent Persichetti, Alun Hoddinott, Arnold Whittall and Easley Blackwood.

For 36 years, he was a professor of composition at the University of Cincinnati – College-Conservatory of Music and the founder/director of the Music X festival of new music (1996–2011) which was held for the first thirteen years in Cincinnati and for the last three years at the Hindemith Music Centre in Blonay, Switzerland. He was president of Chamber Music Cincinnati (2008–2011), and has directed an annual summer course for composer/performers at the UPBEAT International Music School in Milna, Croatia since 2004

He has been the recipient of many honors from organizations such as the American Academy of Arts and Letters, the American Academy of Arts and Letters, Columbia University, BMI, ASCAP, and the American Music Center. Hoffman is a 2017 John Simon Guggenheim Memorial Foundation fellow.

Hoffman's music is published by Onibatan Music, his own publishing house Joel Hoffman official website, RAI Com, ECS Publishing (EC Schirmer), G. Schirmer and Vanderbilt Music Company (Lyra Music Co.).

== Works ==
This is a list of compositions by Joel Hoffman sorted by genre, date of composition, title, and scoring.

Genre	Date	Title	Scoring
Orchestra	2009	...repercussions...	chamber orchestra
Orchestra	2003	to listen, to hear	full orchestra
Orchestra	2001	The Smile	full orchestra
Orchestra	1997	Millennium Dances	full orchestra
Orchestra	1995	ChiaSso	full orchestra
Orchestra	1994	Music for Chamber Orchestra	chamber orchestra
Orchestra	1992	Music in Blue and Green	full orchestra
Orchestra	1985	Between Ten	full orchestra
Orchestra	1980	Chamber Symphony	chamber orchestra
Conducted (non-orchestra)	2016	The Dizi in my Life (alternate version)	dizi solo, string orchestra
Conducted (non-orchestra)	2013	The Dizi in my Life	dizi solo, dizi orchestra, 2 violoncello
Conducted (non-orchestra)	2012	"Party Piece" (for John Cage's 100th birthday)	oboe, bassoon, trumpet, trombone marimba, vibraphone, xylophone accordion, piano violin, viola, violoncello
Conducted (non-orchestra)	2010	Carnivalfinale	piccolo, clarinet, glockenspiel, xylophone 2 pianos, 2 violins, viola, violoncello, contrabass
Conducted (non-orchestra)	2004	The Old Machine at Sovereign Hill	intermediate level string orchestra
Conducted (non-orchestra)	2003	Brave Old Mordechai	clarinet, cimbalom, accordion voice, string orchestra
Conducted (non-orchestra)	1996	L' Chaim Chantata	12-part ensemble
Conducted (non-orchestra)	1990	Reyzele: a Portrait	flute, clarinet, percussion, 2 violins, viola, violoncello, contrabass
Conducted (non-orchestra)	1990	Crossing Points	20 solo strings
Conducted (non-orchestra)	1978	Music from Chartres	2 trumpets, 4 horns, 3 trombones, tuba
Chamber	2017	Bitter Lemon Suite	clarinet, violoncello
Chamber	2017	Xiang He Ge 相和歌	xiao, guitar
Chamber	2017	ei, jauga jauga	clarinet, violoncello, piano
Chamber	2017	Nautilus 鹦鹉螺	sheng, vibraphone, guzheng
Chamber	2016	sizzle 丝竹 (alternate version)	violin, violoncello, piano, 2 marimbas
Chamber	2016	Beijing Express	piano four-hands
Chamber	2016	Riffs on a Great Life	violoncello, piano
Chamber	2015	of Deborah, for Deborah	violin, viola, violoncello, harp
Chamber	2015	Huan Song Redux	dizi, flute
Chamber	2014	Music in Five Parts	flute, viola, harp
Chamber	2013	Osibova Blue	clarinet, 2 violins, viola, violoncello
Chamber	2012	another time	string quartet
Chamber	2012	Music in Yellow and Green	flute, violin, violoncello, piano
Chamber	2011	Camino Azul	string quartet
Chamber	2011	five bedtime stories	clarinet, guzheng
Chamber	2011	Piano Trio 4	violin, violoncello, piano
Chamber	2010	...the first time and the last	version for 10 violoncello
Chamber	2010	Self-Portrait with Orlando	3 flutes
Chamber	2010	Three for Five	violoncello, string quartet
Chamber	2009	...the first time and the last	version for 4 violoncello
Chamber	2009	Three Paths	violoncello, piano
Chamber	2007	passo passo	string quartet, harpsichord
Chamber	2006	6-8-2-4-5-8	flute, clarinet, violin, violoncello piano, marimba
Chamber	2006	Arrivi	string quartet
Chamber	2006	Karptet	violin, viola, violoncello, 2 pianos
Chamber	2006	Three Oranges	violin, marimba
Chamber	2006	Three Snapshots	flute, violoncello
Chamber	2005	Blue and Yellow	flute, piano
Chamber	2005	String Quartet no. 3	string quartet
Chamber	2004	Piano Trio 3 on C#	violin, violoncello, piano
Chamber	2003	Piano Trio 2: Lost Traces	violin, violoncello, piano
Chamber	2003	Coast to Coast	percussion, mandolin/banjo, violin
Chamber	2003	Portogruaro Quartet	2 pianos, 2 percussion
Chamber	2001	Self-Portrait with JS	string trio
Chamber	2001	Gebirtig Speaks	clarinet, violin, viola, violoncello, piano
Chamber	1996	Stone Soup	narrator, violin
Chamber	1996	Portogruaro Sextet	clarinet, horn, violin, viola, violoncello, piano
Chamber	1996	The Music within the Words, Part 1	flute, oboe, violoncello, piano
Chamber	1996	The Music within the Words, Part 1	alternate version flute, clarinet, bassoon, horn, piano
Chamber	1996	The Music within the Words, Part 2	viola, violoncello, harp, piano
Chamber	1995	L' Immensita dell' Attimo	flute, piano
Chamber	1993	String Quartet no. 2	string quartet
Chamber	1992	Metasmo	percussion trio
Chamber	1991	Cubist Blues	violin, violoncello, piano
Chamber	1988	26 × 3 for 3 ( and E.C. at 80 )	percussion trio
Chamber	1988	Fantasia Fiorentina	violin, piano
Chamber	1987	Ricordanza	violoncello, piano
Chamber	1987	Hancock Trio	oboe, horn, piano
Chamber	1984	Music for Two Oboes	2 oboes
Chamber	1984	Duo for Viola and Piano	viola, piano
Chamber	1983	Five Pieces for Two Pianos	2 pianos
Chamber	1982	Music for Trumpets and Strings	2 trumpets, string quartet
Chamber	1982	Sonata for Cello and Piano	violoncello, piano
Chamber	1981	Nirvana, the Waterfall	soprano, violoncello, piano
Chamber	1981	Lyric Variations	6 trombones
Chamber	1980	September Music	contrabass, harp
Chamber	1980	Suite	oboe, bassoon, violoncello, contrabass, percussion
Chamber	1980	Three Bagatelles	oboe, bassoon, piano
Chamber	1980	Divertimento	string quartet, harp, piano
Chamber	1977	Horn Concerto	horn, clarinet, violin, violoncello, piano
Chamber	1977	Variations for Four Flutes	4 flutes
Chamber	1977	Bagatelles for harp and piano	harp, piano
Chamber	1975	Nocturne	violin, piano
Chamber	1975	Variations	violin, violoncello, harp
Concerto	2014	sizzle 丝竹	violin, violoncello, dizi orchestra, 2 yunluo
Concerto	2008	Piano Concerto	piano, orchestra
Concerto	2007	The Forty Steps	oud, violoncello, orchestra
Concerto	1998	Self-Portrait with Gebirtig	violoncello, orchestra
Concerto	1994	Self-Portrait with Mozart	violin, piano, orchestra
Concerto	1991	reconstruction of Mozart's Concerto for Violin, Piano and Orchestra, 1st Movement	violin, piano, orchestra
Concerto	1986	Violin Concerto	violin, orchestra
Concerto	1984	Double Concerto	viola, violoncello, orchestra
Concerto	1978	Triple Concerto	violin, viola, violoncello, orchestra
Solo	2017	Cat Tales	intermediate piano
Solo	2016	AS 8.7.2	piano
Solo	2014	Lamipìfona	violoncello
Solo	2013	Two Hands and Thirty-four thousand Feet	piano
Solo	2012	Amethyst Variations	piano
Solo	2011	un petit endroit très profond à l'intérieur de Dante	piano
Solo	2010	nine pieces for solo piano	piano
Solo	2009	départs	viola
Solo	2009	flutterby	clarinet
Solo	2007	Krakow Variations	version for solo violin
Solo	2007	unaccompanied minor	violoncello
Solo	2007	square one	violin
Solo	2007	unaccompanied minor	violoncello
Solo	2004	at what price?	piano
Solo	2004	For Bill	piano
Solo	2001	Round Midnight Variation	piano
Solo	1999	Krakow Variations	viola
Solo	1991	each for himself?	piano
Solo	1990	Partenze	violin
Solo	1986	Hands Down	piano
Solo	1982	Sonata for Harp	harp
Solo	1978	Concert-Study	flute
Solo	1978	Concert-Study	piano
Solo	1977	Abbassare	viola
Solo	1977	Concert-Study	violoncello
Solo	1975	Fantasy Pieces	piano
Vocal	2005	Sonnet 22	3-part men's chorus, 2 harps
Vocal	1995	L' lmmensita dell' Attimo	mezzo-soprano, piano
Vocal	1987	Sendup, Countdown	SATB chorus + optional piano
Vocal	1974	Three Englynion	SSATB
Theater	2002	The Memory Game	opera in three acts

== Recordings ==
Three Paths. Albany Records.

Includes:

- Three Paths
- Nine pieces for solo piano
- ...the first time and the last

Self Portrait. Albany Records.

Includes:

- Sonata for Cello and Piano
- unaccompanied minor
- Self-Portrait with Gebirtig
- Karpet

Piano Trios. Albany Records.

Includes:

- Piano Trio No.1: Cubist Blues
- Piano Trio No.2: Lost Traces
- Piano Trio on C-Sharp

Cubist Blues. Gasparo Records.

Includes:

- Piano Trio No.1: Cubist Blues
- String Quartet no. 2
- Fantasia Fiorentina
- Sonata for Cello and Piano

Chinese Bamboo Flute Orchestra. China Record Corporation.

Includes Joel Hoffman: The Diz in my life

Bravo Orkester. Zalozba Kaset in Plosc.

Includes Joel Hoffman: Self-Portrait with Gebirtig

The American Experience. Milken Archive of Jewish Music.

Includes Joel Hoffman: Self-Portrait of Gebirtig

American Piano. Gasparo Records.

Includes Joel Hoffman: Fantasy Pieces

Music by Hale Smith, Sheila Silver, Joel Hoffman. CRI Recordings.

Includes Joel Hoffman: Duo for Viola and Piano

Soliloquy. Koch International.

Includes Joel Hoffman: Partenze

Premiere Chamber Works. Centaur Records.

Includes Joel Hoffman: Music for Two Oboes

Americans!. Stradivarius.

Includes Joel Hoffman: Each for Himself?

America. VDM Records.

Includes Blues and Yellow

Tum-Balalayke. EMA Records.

CD of traditional Jewish Songs; Joel Hoffman, piano and arranger

== See also ==
- Joseph H. Bearns Prize
