= Double Time (Béla Fleck album) =

Studio album by Béla Fleck
- Released: 1984
- Recorded: December 1982 and early 1983
- Genre: Americana, bluegrass, folk
- Length: 37:33
- Label: Rounder
- Producer: Béla Fleck

Béla Fleck chronology
Deviation (1984)	Double Time (1984)	Inroads (1986)

Professional ratings
Review scores
Source	Rating
Allmusic	2.5/5 stars

Double Time is an album by American banjoist Béla Fleck, released in 1984.

Every song is a duet with some of the stars of the genre. The billing includes Mark O'Connor, Sam Bush, David Grisman, Pat Flynn, Tony Rice, and Jerry Douglas, among others. In his Allmusic review, Brian Kelly stated, "the program features a dozen or so warm, homegrown finger exercises that dot the music map everywhere between bluegrass and jazz fusion." This album can be compared with similar effort by David Grisman, Dawg Duos, where Fleck performs duo with Grisman on one of the tracks.

== Track listing ==
All songs by Béla Fleck.

1. "Spunk" (feat. Mark O'Connor) – 2:14
2. "Black Forest" (feat. David Grisman) – 2:43
3. "Double Play" (feat. Tony Rice) – 2:59
4. "Lowdown" (feat. Edgar Meyer) – 3:37
5. "The Bullfrog Shuffle" (feat. Mark Schatz) – 1:37
6. "Another Morning" (feat. Jerry Douglas) – 3:34
7. "Light Speed" (feat. Mike Marshall) – 2:34
8. "Sweet Rolls" (feat. John Hartford) – 3:20
9. "Ladies and Gentleman" (feat. Darol Anger) – 2:23
10. "Right As Rain" (feat. Pat Flynn) – 2:32
11. "Far Away" (feat. Mike Marshall) – 2:22
12. "Ready to Go" (feat. Ricky Skaggs) – 1:54
13. "The Fast Lane" (feat. Sam Bush) – 3:21

== Personnel ==
- Béla Fleck – 5-string banjo
- Mark O'Connor – fiddle
- David Grisman – mandolin
- Tony Rice – guitar
- Edgar Meyer – bass
- Mark Schatz – banjo
- Jerry Douglas – dobro
- Mike Marshall – mandolin
- John Hartford – banjo
- Darol Anger – cello
- Pat Flynn – guitar
- Mike Marshall – mandolin
- Ricky Skaggs – fiddle
- Sam Bush – mandolin

Production notes:

- Howard Johnson – engineer
- Kurt Storey – engineer
- Bil VornDick – engineer
- David Glasser – mastering
- Susan Marsh – design, illustrations
