= Deviation (Béla Fleck album) =

Studio album by Béla Fleck
- Released: 1984
- Studio: Stargem Studios, Nashville, Tennessee
- Genre: Americana, bluegrass, folk, folk rock
- Length: 32:13
- Label: Rounder
- Producer: Béla Fleck

Béla Fleck chronology
Natural Bridge (1982)	Deviation (1984)	Double Time (1984)

Professional ratings
Review scores
Source	Rating
Allmusic	3/5 stars

Deviation is an album by American banjoist Béla Fleck, released in 1984. It was recorded with the second classic line-up of the New Grass Revival, consisting of Béla Fleck, Sam Bush, John Cowan and Pat Flynn. The album was dedicated to the memory of Steve Goodman.

== Track listing ==
All tracks written by Béla Fleck, except where noted.

1. "Deviation" – 4:24
2. "Reverie" – 1:42
3. "Nuns For Nixon" – 4:07
4. "Malone" (Kenny Malone) – 1:07
5. "Moontides" – 5:35
6. "Ambrose" – 6:27
7. "OMAC" (Mark O'Connor) – 0:36
8. "Jalmon With Salmon" (Sam Bush, John Cowan, Béla Fleck, Kenny Malone) – 2:17
9. "Mbanza" – 1:18
10. "Places" – 7:11

== Personnel ==
New Grass Revival

- Béla Fleck – banjo
- Pat Flynn – guitar
- Sam Bush – mandolin
- John Cowan – bass

Special Guests:

- Kenny Malone - drums, clay pots
- Mark O'Connor - fiddle
- Jerry Douglas - dobro
- Humble - space yodels (end of "Places")

== Production ==
- Béla Fleck - production
- Bil VornDick - recording engineer mixer
- Melodie Gimple - photography
- Willy Matthews - album design
