= Edmar Castañeda =

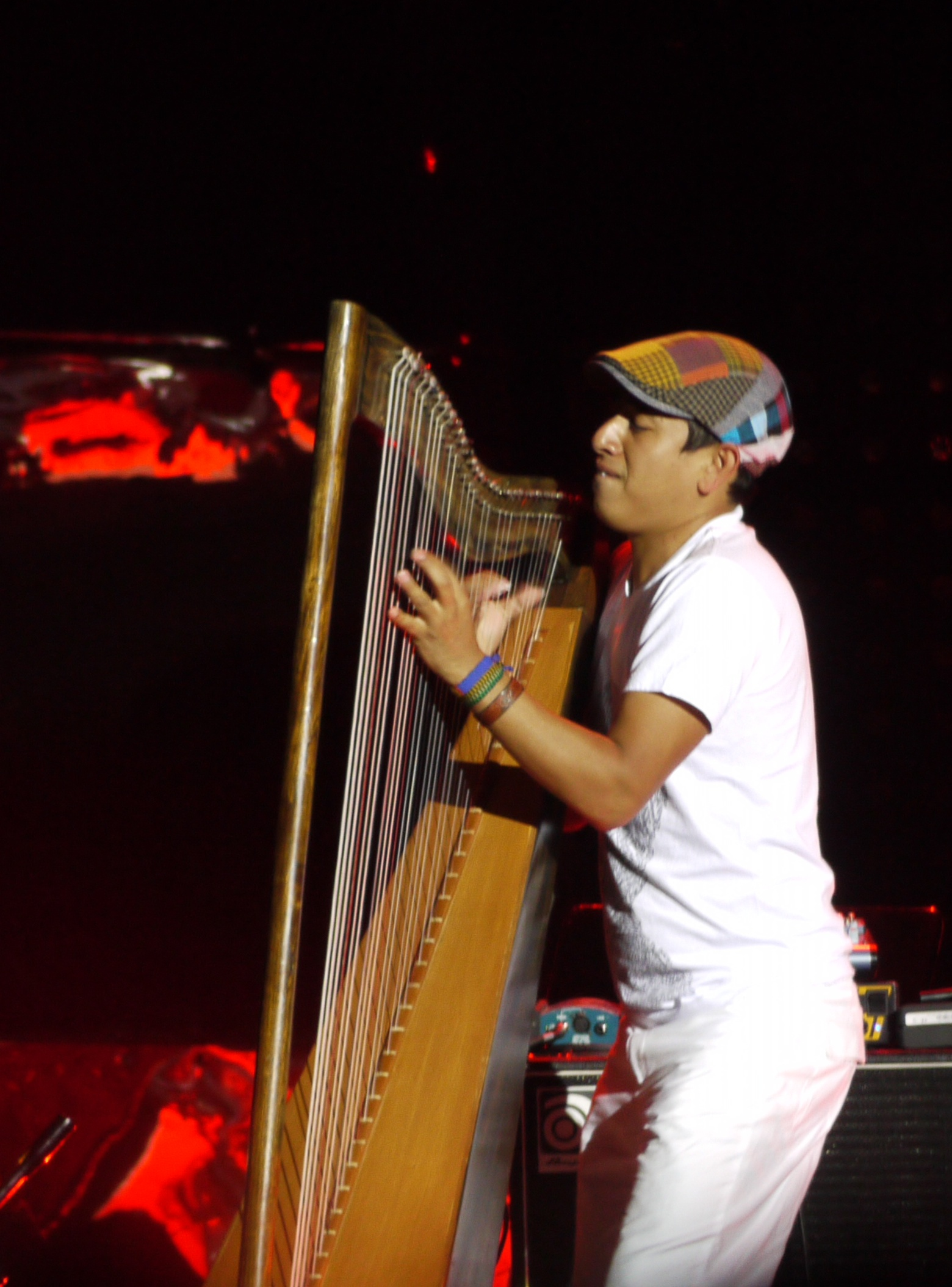
- Edmar Castañeda at Marcus+ concert, 2011

Background information
- Born: 31 March 1978 (age 48); Bogotá, Colombia
- Genres: Latin Jazz
- Occupation: Musician
- Instrument: Harp
- Years active: 1990s–present
- Label: Arpayvozrecords
- Website: www.edmarcastaneda.com

Edmar Castañeda is a Colombian harpist, composer and bandleader known for his work in jazz and for expanding the role of the Colombian llanera harp in contemporary music. Born in Bogotá, Colombia, Castañeda moved to the United States in 1994 and became active in the New York jazz scene, developing a distinctive approach to the harp that combines bass lines, harmony, melody and rhythmic elements.

Castañeda has performed and collaborated with musicians including Wynton Marsalis, Paquito D'Rivera, Béla Fleck, John Scofield, Marcus Miller, Hiromi, Gonzalo Rubalcaba, Ivan Lins, Pedrito Martinez, Paco de Lucía and The Yellowjackets. Paquito D'Rivera was an early supporter of Castañeda and helped introduce him to the jazz community.

As a bandleader, Castañeda has released recordings including Cuarto de Colores, Entre Cuerdas, Double Portion, Live at the Jazz Standard, Live in Montreal, Harp vs. Harp, Family and Viento Sur. His album Family was nominated for a Latin Grammy Award for Best Latin Jazz Album.

Castañeda is also a member of BEATrio, with Béla Fleck and Antonio Sánchez. The trio's self-titled album, BEATrio, received a Grammy Award nomination for Best Contemporary Instrumental Album at the 68th Annual Grammy Awards in 2026.

In addition to performing, Castañeda has composed for orchestral and large-ensemble settings. Carnegie Hall co-commissioned his composition Bordones, written for EC Llanera Harp and string orchestra and premiered at Carnegie Hall. He was also commissioned by the Jazz at Lincoln Center Orchestra to compose Tres Cordilleras, a work for harp and big band, which he performed with the Jazz at Lincoln Center Orchestra under the direction of Wynton Marsalis.

Castañeda collaborated with the French harp manufacturer Camac Harps in the development of the EC Llanera Harp, an instrument designed to expand the technical and musical possibilities of the traditional llanera harp for contemporary performance.

His orchestral and large-ensemble work has included performances and collaborations with the Jazz at Lincoln Center Orchestra, Orquestra Clássica de Espinho, São Paulo Jazz Symphony Orchestra, Israel Camerata Jerusalem and Orquesta Sinfónica Nacional de Colombia.

In 2021, Castañeda contributed to Walt Disney Animation Studios' film Encanto, which features songs by Lin-Manuel Miranda. He performed on the film's soundtrack and served as a musical consultant.

Castañeda's playing has received international critical attention. NPR's Fresh Air highlighted his ability to perform lead, rhythm and bass lines simultaneously, while The New York Times has written about his combination of modern jazz with his Colombian musical roots. His work has also been featured by publications including Billboard and the Frankfurter Allgemeine Zeitung.

Castañeda's album Global Heartbeat is scheduled for release in 2026. The project continues his exploration of jazz, Colombian musical traditions and contemporary composition and includes his quartet featuring harp, voice, tenor saxophone and drums.

== Other appearances ==
- "Hang On Mike", Candy Butchers, 2004
- "Island Life", Yerba Buena, 2005
- "La Marea", Marta Topferova, 2005
- "La Cantina", Lila Downs, 2006
- "Alma Latina", Arturo Romay, 2007
- "Lluvia de amores", Andrea Tierra, 2017
- "Cuarto de Colores", 2009
- "Entre Cuerdas", 2009
- "Double Portion", 2012
- "BEATrio" with Béla Fleck and Antonio Sanchez, 2025
