= Appalachia Waltz =

Studio album by Yo-Yo Ma, Edgar Meyer and Mark O'Connor
- Released: 17 September 1996
- Recorded: 17–20 August 1995
- Studios: Sound Emporium (Nashville, Tennessee)
- Genres: Classical, bluegrass
- Length: 69:38
- Label: Sony Classical
- Producers: Edgar Meyer and Mark O'Connor

Yo-Yo Ma, Edgar Meyer and Mark O'Connor chronology
Appalachia Waltz (1996)	Appalachian Journey (2000)

Professional ratings
Review scores
Source	Rating
The Strad	favorable
Gramophone	(reserved favorable)

Appalachia Waltz is the first album from the trio of cellist Yo-Yo Ma, double-bassist and composer Edgar Meyer, and fiddler and composer Mark O'Connor. Sony Classical released the disc in 1996. It was recorded over three days, 14–17 August 1995.

In its June 1997 issue, Bass Player magazine named it one of "30 Essential Bass Albums You Must Own", due to Meyer's exceptional work on the album. The trio followed up this album with Appalachian Journey in 2000. The album reached No. 1 on the Billboard's Top Classical Albums chart.

== Track listing ==
1. "The Green Groves of Erin/The Flowers of Red Hill" (Traditional - arr:Edgar Meyer)
2. "Appalachia Waltz" (Mark O'Connor - arr:Meyer)
3. "Chief Sitting in the Rain" (Traditional - arr:Meyer, O'Connor)
4. "Mama" (Meyer)
5. "Butterfly's Day Out" (O'Connor - arr:Meyer)
6. "Druid Fluid" (Meyer, O'Connor)
7. "First Impressions" (Meyer)
8. "Étienne et Petunia" (Meyer)
9. "F.C.'s Jig" (O'Connor)
10. "College Hornpipe" (Traditional - arr:Meyer, O'Connor)
11. "Pickles" (Meyer)
12. "Old Country Fairytale" (O'Connor)
13. "Schizoozy" (Meyer)
14. "Star of the County Down" (Traditional - arr:Meyer)
15. "Speed the Plow Medley" (Traditional - arr:Meyer, O'Connor)
16. "Fair Dancer Reel" (O'Connor - arr:Meyer)

== Personnel ==
- Yo-Yo Ma: cello
- Edgar Meyer: bass, piano on "First Impressions"
- Mark O'Connor: violin, mandolin on "Butterfly's Day Out"
