= Short Trip Home =

Studio album by Joshua Bell & Edgar Meyer with Sam Bush, Mike Marshall
- Released: September 7, 1999
- Recorded: August 1998
- Genre: Classical
- Length: 64:46
- Label: Sony Classical
- Producer: Edgar Meyer

Professional ratings
Review scores
Source	Rating
Billboard	favorable
Gramophone	favorable

Short Trip Home is an album of classical chamber music by a quartet unusual both for its membership and its instrumentation. Double bassist Edgar Meyer wrote the majority of the compositions recorded on the album for a quartet of violin, double bass, mandolin, and guitar. Classical violinist Joshua Bell joins bluegrass musicians Sam Bush and Mike Marshall and Meyer on the album. In addition to classical music in an American vernacular, the quartet occasionally breaks out on more traditional instrumental bluegrass tunes.

== Track listing ==
1. "Short Trip Home" (Edgar Meyer)
2. "Hang Hang" (Meyer, Mike Marshall)
3. "BT" (Meyer)
4. "In the Nick of Time" (Meyer)
5. Concert Duo. Prequel (Meyer)
6. "BP" (Meyer)
7. "If I Knew" (Meyer)
8. "OK, All Right" (Meyer)
9. "Death by Triple Fiddle" (Meyer, Sam Bush, Marshall, Joshua Bell)
10. Concert Duo. 1 (all movements by Meyer)
11. Concert Duo. 2
12. Concert Duo. 3
13. Concert Duo. 4

== Personnel ==
- Joshua Bell – violin
- Edgar Meyer – bass
- Sam Bush – mandolin; violin on "Death by Triple Fiddle"
- Mike Marshall – guitar; mandola on "BT"; violin on "Death by Triple Fiddle"

== In popular culture ==
The track "Short Trip Home" is heard in the Richard Proenneke documentary Alone in the Wilderness.

The tracks “In the Nick of Time” and "Concert Duo. 1" are heard in the Ken Burns documentary The War (miniseries).

The track "BT" was used as the theme song for WUNC (FM)'s The State of Things (radio show) from 2004 until 2010.

The track "Short Trip Home" was used as the theme song in “The Tin Mine”, a 2005 Thai movie.
