= Tales from the Acoustic Planet, Vol. 3: Africa Sessions =

Studio album by Béla Fleck
- Released: March 3, 2009
- Genre: African
- Label: Rounder

Béla Fleck chronology
Abigail Washburn & The Sparrow Quartet (2008)	Tales from the Acoustic Planet, Vol. 3: Africa Sessions (2009)	The Melody of Rhythm (2009)

Professional ratings
Review scores
Source	Rating
AllMusic	4/5 stars

Tales from the Acoustic Planet, Vol. 3: Africa Sessions is an album by banjoist Béla Fleck. Nicknamed "Throw Down Your Heart" after one of the songs, the album is actually a soundtrack for a film of the same name, released by Docurama Films, which he produced, about travelling through Africa, recording with many musicians from that continent as he searched for the origins of the banjo. The DVD was released by Docurama on November 3, 2009, while the Blu-ray was released by Shout! Factory in the future. It was also aired on Palladia.

== Track listing ==
1. "Tulinesangala" (Traditional) with Nakisenyi Women's Group from Uganda
2. "Kinetsa" (Randrianasolo) with D'Gary from Madagascar
3. "Ah Ndiya" (Sangare) with Oumou Sangare from Mali
4. "Kabibi" (Nogoglia) with Anania Ngoglia from Tanzania
5. "Angelina" (Traditional) with Luo Cultural Association from Uganda
6. "D'Gary Jam" (Fleck, Radrianasolo) with musicians from Madagascar, Uganda, Mali, Senegal, South Africa, Tanzania, and Cameroon
7. "Throw Down Your Heart" (Fleck) with Haruna Samake Trio and Bassekou Kouyate from Mali
8. "Thula Mama" (Mahlasela) with Vusi Mahlasela from South Africa
9. "Wairenziante" (Muwewesu) with Muwewesu Xylophone Group from Uganda
10. "Buribalal" (Bocoum) with Afel Bocoum from Mali
11. "Zawose" (Traditional) with Chibite/The Zawose Family from Tanzania
12. "Ajula/Mabamba" (Traditional) with The Jatta Family from the Gambia
13. "Pakugyenda Balebauo" (Chacha) with Warema Masiaga Cha Cha from Tanzania
14. "Jesus is the Only Answer" (Ateso Jazz band), with Ateso Jazz Band from Uganda
15. "Matitu" (Traditional) with Khalifan Matitu from Tanzania
16. "Mariam" (Fleck, Tounkara) with Djelimady Tounkara from Mali
17. "Djorolen" (Sangare) with Oumou Sangare from Mali
18. "Dunia Haina Wema/Thumb Fun" (Fleck, Ngoliga) with Anania Ngoliga from Tanzania
