= Bill Stromberg =

Business executive and American football player (born 1960)

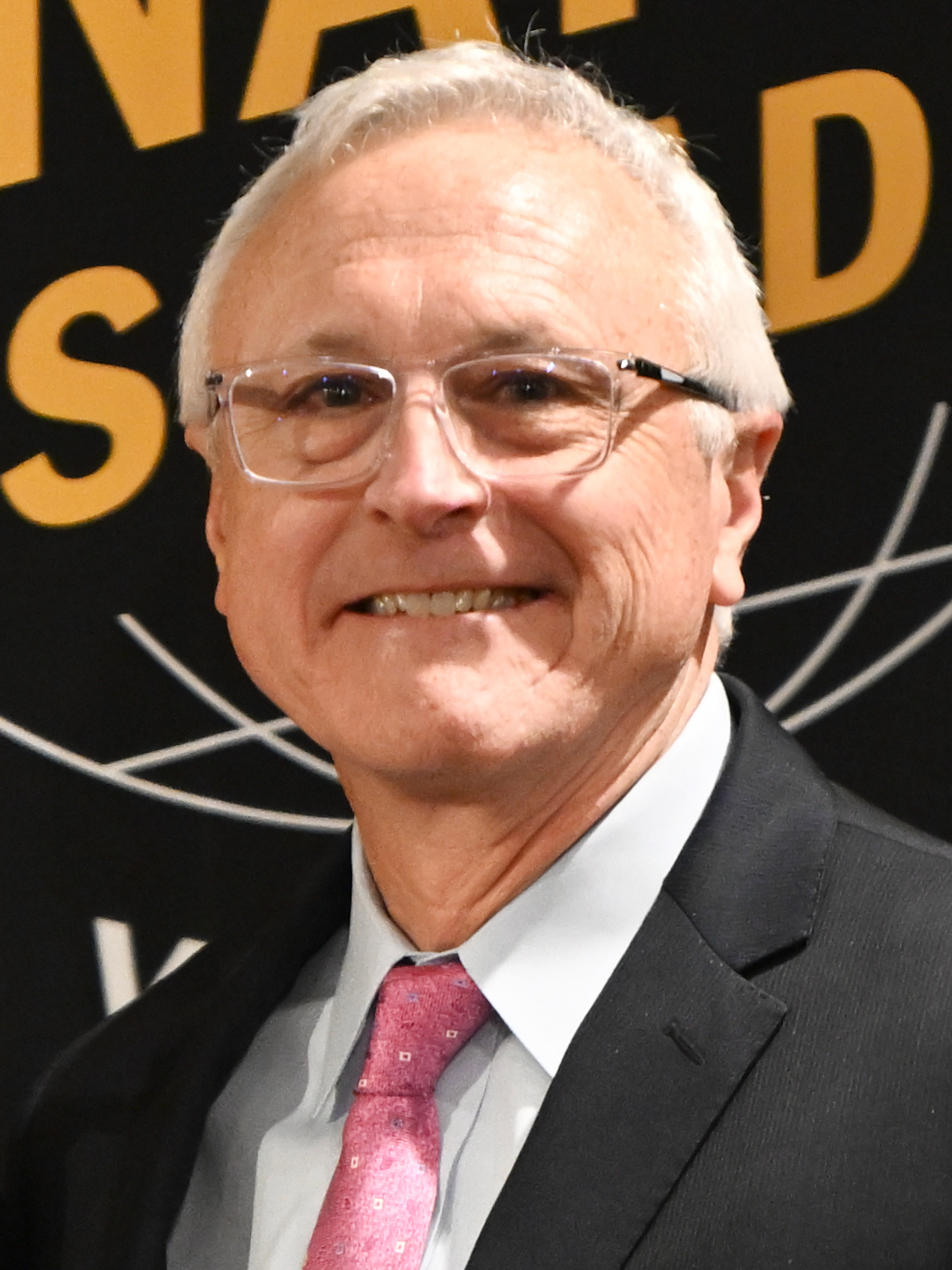

Personal information
- Born: March 10, 1960 (age 66); Towson, Maryland

Career information
- College: Johns Hopkins University; Dartmouth College
- College Football Hall of Fame

William Stromberg (born March 10, 1960) is a former president and CEO of T. Rowe Price, a Baltimore-based global asset management firm.

== Football and baseball ==
For high school, Stromberg attended Loyola Blakefield, a Catholic college preparatory school for boys located in Towson, Maryland near Baltimore. He then attended Johns Hopkins University, earning a B.A. in 1982. While at Hopkins, he set long-standing records for both the baseball and football teams. His records for baseball included record runs scored and stolen bases, and his many accomplishments on the football team made him "arguably the best football player in Johns Hopkins history." Beyond Hopkins, he is considered to be one of the best wide receivers in NCAA Division III history as the holder of six national and thirteen school records. Stromberg was inducted into the Johns Hopkins Hall of Fame and then the College Football Hall of Fame in 2004, and was, as of 2017, the only Hopkins football player to be inducted there. Hopkins constructed a new baseball field and athletic facilities named Stromberg Stadium in 2014 in his honor.

After graduation, Stromberg signed as a free agent with the Philadelphia Eagles, played a few preseason games before pulling a hamstring, and was ultimately cut before the 1982 season began.

== Career ==
Stromberg earned an MBA from Dartmouth College's Tuck School of Business and the CFA designation before becoming an equity analyst at T. Rowe Price, a Baltimore-based global asset management firm, in 1987. He remained an analyst until 1992, at which point he took over management of the Dividend Growth Fund. Then, from 2000 to 2006, he was portfolio manager of another fund. He served the next three years as the head of the firm's U.S.-based equity operations before becoming the head of equity across the firm in 2009.

Stromberg took over for James A. C. Kennedy as president and CEO of T. Rowe Price on January 1, 2016, at which point Stromberg had been with the firm for nearly thirty years. As president of the firm, Stromberg helped found the Greater Washington Partnership, "a group of chief executives and business leaders from the Baltimore-Washington area" aiming to improve its economy and infrastructure.

== Personal life ==
Stromberg is a trustee of his alma mater Johns Hopkins University, as well as its Whiting School of Engineering Advisory Council. He also served as the president of the board of Catholic Charities, a local nonprofit charity organization affiliated with the Archdiocese of Baltimore.
