= Telluride Sessions =

The Telluride Sessions

Studio album by Strength in Numbers
- Released: 1989
- Recorded: January 1989
- Genres: Bluegrass; progressive bluegrass
- Length: 45:48
- Label: MCA Nashville
- Producer: Strength in Numbers

Alternative cover
- The album cover from the 1998 re-release with the title Telluride Sessions.

Professional ratings
Review scores
Source	Rating
Allmusic	4.5/5 stars

The Telluride Sessions is an album recorded by five acoustic-music instrumentalists under the name Strength in Numbers and released in 1989 on MCA Records Nashville. The five members are: Sam Bush, Jerry Douglas, Béla Fleck, Mark O'Connor, and Edgar Meyer. The album is progressive bluegrass with jazz inflections, but also adds elements from classical music. O'Connor, Fleck, and Meyer further developed this genre in their compositions for orchestra and chamber music.

Apart from the ground-breaking musicianship, the project is also notable because each song was composed by a different pair of the artists featured. Each possible pair of musicians created one song for the album, one of the reasons for the name of the band, Strength in Numbers.

== Track listing ==
1. "Future Man" (O'Connor, Douglas)
2. "Texas Red" (Bush, Fleck)
3. "Pink Flamingos" (Bush, Meyer)
4. "Duke and Cookie" (Bush, Douglas)
5. "One Winter's Night" (Meyer, O'Connor)
6. "Macedonia" (Bush, O'Connor)
7. "The Lochs of Dread" (Fleck, Douglas)
8. "No Apologies" (Douglas, Meyer)
9. "Slopes" (Fleck, O'Connor)
10. "Blue Men of the Sahara" (Fleck, Meyer)

== Personnel ==
- Sam Bush - mandolin, violin on "One Winter's Night"
- Béla Fleck - banjo, guitar on "One Winter's Night"
- Mark O'Connor - violin, guitar on "Slopes", mandolin on "Macedonia"
- Edgar Meyer - bass
- Jerry Douglas - dobro
