= The Bluegrass Sessions: Tales from the Acoustic Planet, Vol. 2 =

The Bluegrass Sessions: Tales from the Acoustic Planet Volume 2

Studio album by Béla Fleck
- Released: June 22, 1999
- Genre: Bluegrass, Americana, folk, jazz, polka
- Length: 75:39
- Label: Warner Bros.

Béla Fleck chronology
Tabula Rasā (1996)	The Bluegrass Sessions: Tales from the Acoustic Planet Volume 2 (1999)	Perpetual Motion (2001)

Professional ratings
Review scores
Source	Rating
Allmusic	4/5 stars

The Bluegrass Sessions: Tales from the Acoustic Planet, Vol.2 is an album by Béla Fleck. Going back to his bluegrass roots, Fleck put together a band of all-stars of the genre: Sam Bush, Jerry Douglas, Stuart Duncan, Tony Rice, Mark Schatz, Vassar Clements, John Hartford and others.

== Track listing ==
All tracks written by Bela Fleck, unless otherwise noted.

1. "Blue Mountain Hop" – 4:26
2. "Buffalo Nickel" – 4:38
3. "When Joy Kills Sorrow" – 5:10
4. "Spanish Point" – 5:36
5. "Polka On The Banjo" (Leon Luallen, Richard Tillman & George Williams) – 4:04
6. "Clarinet Polka" (Traditional) – 1:33
7. "The Over Grown Waltz" – 3:42
8. "Ode To Earl" – 3:09
9. "Home Sweet Home" (Traditional, feat. Earl Scruggs) – 2:20
10. "Valley Of The Rogue" – 5:12
11. "Plunky's Lament" – 2:17
12. "Maura On A Bicycle, Stout And Molasses, Way Back When" (Medley) – 9:41
13. "Dark Circles" – 5:13
14. "Old Jellico, Puddle Jumper, Dead Man's Hill" (Medley) – 6:08
15. "Katmandu" – 4:23
16. "Do You Have Room?" (Poem recitation by John Hartford) – 1:17
17. "Foggy Mountain Special" (Gladys Stacey, Louise Certain) – 2:12
18. "Major Honker" – 4:38

== Personnel ==
- Sam Bush – mandolin
- Vassar Clements – fiddle
- Jerry Douglas – Dobro
- Stuart Duncan – fiddle
- Béla Fleck – Banjo, Producer, Art Direction, Mixing, Photography, Vocal (track 5 only)
- Vince Gill – vocals
- John Hartford – banjo, fiddle, vocals
- Bob Mater – Drums
- Tim O'Brien – Vocals
- Larry Paxton – Tuba
- Tony Rice – Guitar, Photography
- Mark Schatz – Bass
- Ricky Skaggs – Vocals
- Joey Miskulin – Accordion
- Earl Scruggs - Banjo

=== Production ===
- Richard Battaglia – Engineer, Mixing, Photography
- Senor McGuire – Photography
- Denny Purcell – Mastering
- Garrett Rittenberry – Art Direction
- Bil VornDick – Engineer, Mixing
- Cindy Wilson – Photography
