= Tabula Rasā =

Studio album by Béla Fleck, Vishwa Mohan Bhatt, Jie-Bing Chen
- Released: July 2, 1996
- Genre: Folk
- Length: 53:53
- Label: Water Lily Acoustics
- Producer: Kavichandran Alexander, Béla Fleck

Béla Fleck chronology
| Tales from the Acoustic Planet (1995) | Tabula Rasā (1996) | The Bluegrass Sessions: Tales from the Acoustic Planet, Vol. 2 (1999) |

Tabula Rasā is a collaborative album by American banjoist Béla Fleck together with Vishwa Mohan Bhatt (playing traditional Indian slide guitar "Mohan veena") and Jie-Bing Chen, who plays the traditional Chinese two-string fiddle erhu. The unusual combination of Fleck's banjo together with these traditional instruments creates a unique sound on this album, which was nominated for the Grammy Award for Best World Music Album at the 39th Grammy Awards.

Professional ratings
Review scores
| Source | Rating |
|---|---|
| Allmusic | link |

== Track listing ==
1. "Cārukeśī" (Vishwa Mohan Bhatt) – 6:42
2. "Emperor's Mare" (Traditional) – 1:39
3. "Rādhā Kṛṣṇa Līlā" (Ronu Majumdar) – 6:42
4. "John Hardy" (Traditional) – 2:29
5. "Tabula Rasā" (Béla Fleck) – 3:06
6. "Geocentricity" (Fleck) – 6:07
7. "The Way Of Love" (Fleck) – 4:15
8. "Earl In Shanghai" (Fleck) – 4:59
9. "Water Gardens" (Traditional) – 4:36
10. "The Jade Princess" (Fleck) – 2:57
11. "The Dancing Girl" (Bhatt) – 10:20

== Personnel ==
- Béla Fleck - banjo
- Vishwa Mohan Bhatt - Mohan veena
- Jie-Bing Chen - Erhu
- Ronu Majumdar - Bansuri
- Sangeeta Shankar - violin
- Poovalur Sriji (Srinivasan) - Mridangam
