= Drive (Béla Fleck album) =

Studio album by Béla Fleck
- Released: 1988
- Studio: Nashville Sound Connection, Nashville, Tennessee
- Genre: Americana, bluegrass, folk
- Length: 47:33
- Label: Rounder
- Producer: Béla Fleck

Béla Fleck chronology
Daybreak (1987)	Drive (1988)	Places (1988)

Professional ratings
Review scores
Source	Rating
Allmusic	3/5 stars

Drive is an album by American banjoist Béla Fleck. The album was produced toward the end of Fleck's New Grass Revival career and before the Flecktones were formed and included an all-star list of bluegrass performers.

== Track listing ==
All tracks written by Béla Fleck; except where indicated.

1. "Whitewater"
2. "Slipstream"
3. "Up And Around the Bend"
4. "Natchez Trace"
5. "See Rock City"
6. "The Legend"
7. "The Lights Of Home"
8. "Down In The Swamp"
9. "Sanctuary"
10. "The Open Road"
11. "Crucial County Breakdown"

Bonus track on the SACD version*

1. "Shuckin' The Corn" (Gladys Stacey, Josh Graves, Louise Certain)

== Personnel ==
- Béla Fleck - banjo
- Tony Rice - guitar
- Sam Bush - mandolin
- Stuart Duncan - fiddle
- Mark O'Connor - fiddle
- Jerry Douglas - Dobro
- Mark Schatz - Bass
- Recorded and Mixed By Bil VornDick
