= Strength in Numbers (band) =

Progressive bluegrass supergroup

- Genres: Progressive bluegrass
- Years active: 1989
- Label: MCA Nashville
- Past members: Béla Fleck; Mark O'Connor; Sam Bush; Jerry Douglas; Edgar Meyer

Strength In Numbers was a progressive bluegrass supergroup formed in the late 1980s.

The group featured Sam Bush (mandolin), Jerry Douglas (dobro), Béla Fleck (banjo), Mark O'Connor (violin, guitar, mandolin), and Edgar Meyer (bass). They released their only album, Telluride Sessions, in 1989. The group, minus Fleck, played on "Nothing but a Child" from Steve Earle's 1988 album, Copperhead Road under the name "Telluride".

The catalyst for their progressive approach to bluegrass was Sam Bush's group, New Grass Revival, in 1971. In 1975 this group made their first appearance at the Telluride Bluegrass Festival at Telluride, Colorado. New Grass Revival met at subsequent festivals in Telluride in the late 1970s and 1980s.

The music of Strength in Numbers is influenced by the bluegrass virtuoso music of earlier artists Bill Monroe and the Bluegrass boys, and Lester Flatt and Earl Scruggs. Often the music of Strength in Numbers is referred to as "Newgrass" or progressive bluegrass. This music uses core bluegrass instrumentation with rhythmic features and solo playing styles of jazz.
