= Appalachian Journey =

Studio album by Yo-Yo Ma, Edgar Meyer and Mark O'Connor
- Released: 2000
- Recorded: July, September 1999
- Genre: Classical, bluegrass
- Length: 70:38
- Label: Sony Classical
- Producer: Steven Epstein

Yo-Yo Ma, Edgar Meyer and Mark O'Connor chronology
| Appalachia Waltz (1996) | Appalachian Journey (2000) |

Professional ratings
Review scores
| Source | Rating |
|---|---|
| Allmusic | 4/5 stars |

Appalachian Journey is the second album from the string trio of bassist and composer Edgar Meyer, fiddler and composer Mark O'Connor, and cellist Yo-Yo Ma. James Taylor and Alison Krauss join the trio individually on two Stephen Foster songs arranged for the trio. Sony Classical released the disc in 2000. The album joined a number of other recordings released since Appalachia Waltz that continue a new kind of classical music tinged with and influenced by the sounds and structures of America's own musical traditions. It is possible that the titles of these albums imply a continuity of the American classical tradition begun by Aaron Copland in Appalachian Spring. Unlike their first album, the three virtuosos spent several months on the compositions and arrangements, from July 19 to September 10, 1999.

The album reached No. 1 on Billboard's Classical Albums chart and won a Grammy Award for Best Classical Crossover Album.

== Track listing ==
1. "1B" (Edgar Meyer)
2. "Misty Moonlight Waltz" (Mark O'Connor)
3. "Hard Times Come Again No More" (Stephen Foster - arr:James Taylor, Yo-Yo Ma, Meyer, O'Connor)
4. "Indecision" (Meyer)
5. "Limerock" (Traditional - arr:O'Connor, Meyer)
6. "Benjamin" (Taylor)
7. "Fisher's Hornpipe" (Traditional - arr:O'Connor)
8. "Duet for Cello and Bass" (Meyer)
9. "Emily's Reel" (O'Connor - arr:Meyer)
10. "Cloverfoot Reel" (Meyer)
11. "Poem for Carlita" (O'Connor)
12. "Caprice for Three" (O'Connor)
13. "Second Time Around" (Meyer)
14. "Slumber my Darling" (Stephen Foster - arr:Meyer)
15. "Vistas" (O'Connor)

== Personnel ==
- Mark O'Connor, violin
- Yo-Yo Ma, cello
- Edgar Meyer, bass
- James Taylor, vocals on "Hard Times Come Again No More", guitar on "Benjamin"
- Alison Krauss, violin on "Fisher's Hornpipe", vocals on "Slumber My Darling"

== See also ==
- Alan Lomax, who created a documentary Appalachian Journey (1991)
