= Jiebing Chen =

Chinese musician

Jiebing Chen (simplified Chinese: 陈 洁 冰; traditional Chinese: 陳潔冰; pinyin: Chén Jiébīng; sometimes credited as Jie-Bing Chen) is a Chinese musician based in the United States who specializes in the erhu (two-string fiddle).

== Biography ==
Born in Shanghai, China, Chen turned professional when she was 9 and became a soldier musician in order to comply with the restrictions on playing music imposed by the Cultural Revolution. She went to the United States in 1989 to study at the State University of New York at Buffalo, where she received an M.A. in music theory.

In addition to her work performing Chinese traditional and contemporary music, Chen has also participated in a number of cross-cultural collaborations, including recordings and performances with Vishwa Mohan Bhatt, Béla Fleck, and James Newton. She has also performed jazz with the Jon Jang Sextet and the Beijing Trio (a collaboration with Jang and drummer Max Roach). Her recording Tabula Rasā (recorded with Bhatt and Fleck) was nominated for a Grammy Award for Best World Music Album.

She lives in California.

== Films ==
- 1999 - L. Subramaniam: Violin From the Heart. Directed by Jean Henri Meunier. (Includes a scene featuring L. Subramaniam in collaboration with Jiebing Chen.)
