= Perpetual Motion (album) =

Studio album by Béla Fleck
- Released: October 2, 2001
- Recorded: Sanctuary Studios Nashville, TN also: Avatar Recording Studios, New York City; Air Studios, London Peacock Gardens Studio, Nashville, TN
- Genre: Classical crossover
- Length: 57:44
- Label: Sony Classical
- Producers: Béla Fleck and Edgar Meyer

Béla Fleck chronology
The Bluegrass Sessions: Tales from the Acoustic Planet, Vol. 2 (1999)	Perpetual Motion (2001)	Music For Two (2004)

Professional ratings
Review scores
Source	Rating
Allmusic	3/5 stars

Perpetual Motion is an album of classical music released in 2001. The album is unusual in that none of the pieces featured on it are played on the instruments for which they were written. Arrangers Béla Fleck and Edgar Meyer won a Grammy in 2002 for their arrangement of Claude Debussy's "Doctor Gradus Ad Parnassum". The album also won a Grammy Award as Best Classical Crossover Album.

Fleck assembled a group of musicians well known on their own instruments: violinist Joshua Bell, cellist Gary Hoffman, percussionist Evelyn Glennie, double-bassist Edgar Meyer, mandolin player Chris Thile, and guitarists John Williams and Bryan Sutton.

== Track listing ==
All songs arranged by Edgar Meyer and Béla Fleck with additional arranger specified:

1. "Keyboard Sonata In C Major" (K 159, L 104) (Domenico Scarlatti) – 2:19
2. "Two Part Invention No. 13 In A Minor" (BWV 784) (Johann Sebastian Bach) – 1:45
3. "Doctor Gradus Ad Parnassum" from Children's Corner Suite (L 113) (Claude Debussy) – 2:25
4. Mazurka In F Sharp Minor, Op. 59 No. 3 (Frédéric Chopin) – 3:43
5. "Prelude" from Partitia No. 3 for Solo Violin (BWV 1006) (Bach) – 3:47
6. Etude In C Sharp Minor, Op. 10 No. 4 (Chopin) – 2:13
7. Mazurka In F Sharp Minor, Op. 6 No. 1 (Chopin) – 2:24
8. Three-Part Invention (Sinfonia) No. 10 (BWV 796) (Bach) – 1:01
9. Melody In E-flat (Peter Tchaikovsky) – 3:15
10. "Presto No. 1 In G Minor After Bach" from Five Studies for Piano (Johannes Brahms) – 1:49
11. "Prelude" from Suite for Unaccompanied Cello No. 1 (BWV 1007) (Bach) – 2:17
12. Three-Part Invention (Sinfonia) No. 15 (BWV 801) (Bach) – 1:14
13. Moto Perpetuo Op. 11 No. 2 (Nicolò Paganini) – 3:40
14. Keyboard Sonata In D Minor (K 213, L 108) (Scarlatti) – 4:51
15. Two Part Invention No. 6 (BWV 777) (Bach) – 2:29
16. "Adagio Sostenuto" from Piano Sonata No. 14 In C Sharp Minor, Op. 27 No. 2 "Moonlight" (Ludwig van Beethoven) – 5:07
17. Two Part Invention No. 11 (BWV 782) (Bach) – 0:55
18. Seven Variations In C On "God Save The King" (Beethoven) – 9:06
19. Three-Part Invention (Sinfonia) No. 7 (BWV 793) (Bach) – 2:01
20. Moto Perpetuo Op. 11 No. 2 (Bluegrass Version) (Paganini - arr: Bryan Sutton) – 2:38

== Personnel ==
- Béla Fleck - Gibson 1937 TB-75 banjo, Gold Star banjo with thick gut (1-20) strings (2)
- Joshua Bell - Tom Taylor Stradivarius violin of 1732 (3,7,12,19)
- Gary Hoffman - 1662 Nicolò Amati cello made in Cremona, Italy (3,6,16)
- Evelyn Glennie - Malletech marimba (2,10,12,17)
- Edgar Meyer - Customized 1769 Gabrielli double bass (8,15,16,19), piano (9,13)
- Chris Thile - 2000 Lynn Dudenbostel F5 mandolin (1,8,14)
- Bryan Sutton - 1996 Bourgeois D150 steel string guitar (20)
- John Williams - 2000 Greg Smallman and Sons guitar (4,18)

== Awards ==
Grammy Awards of 2002

- Winner- Best Instrumental Arrangement - Béla Fleck and Edgar Meyer (arrangers) for Debussy: Doctor Gradus Ad Parnassum performed by Béla Fleck with Joshua Bell and Gary Hoffman
- Winner- Best Classical Crossover Album
