= Edgar Meyer =

American bassist and composer (born 1960)

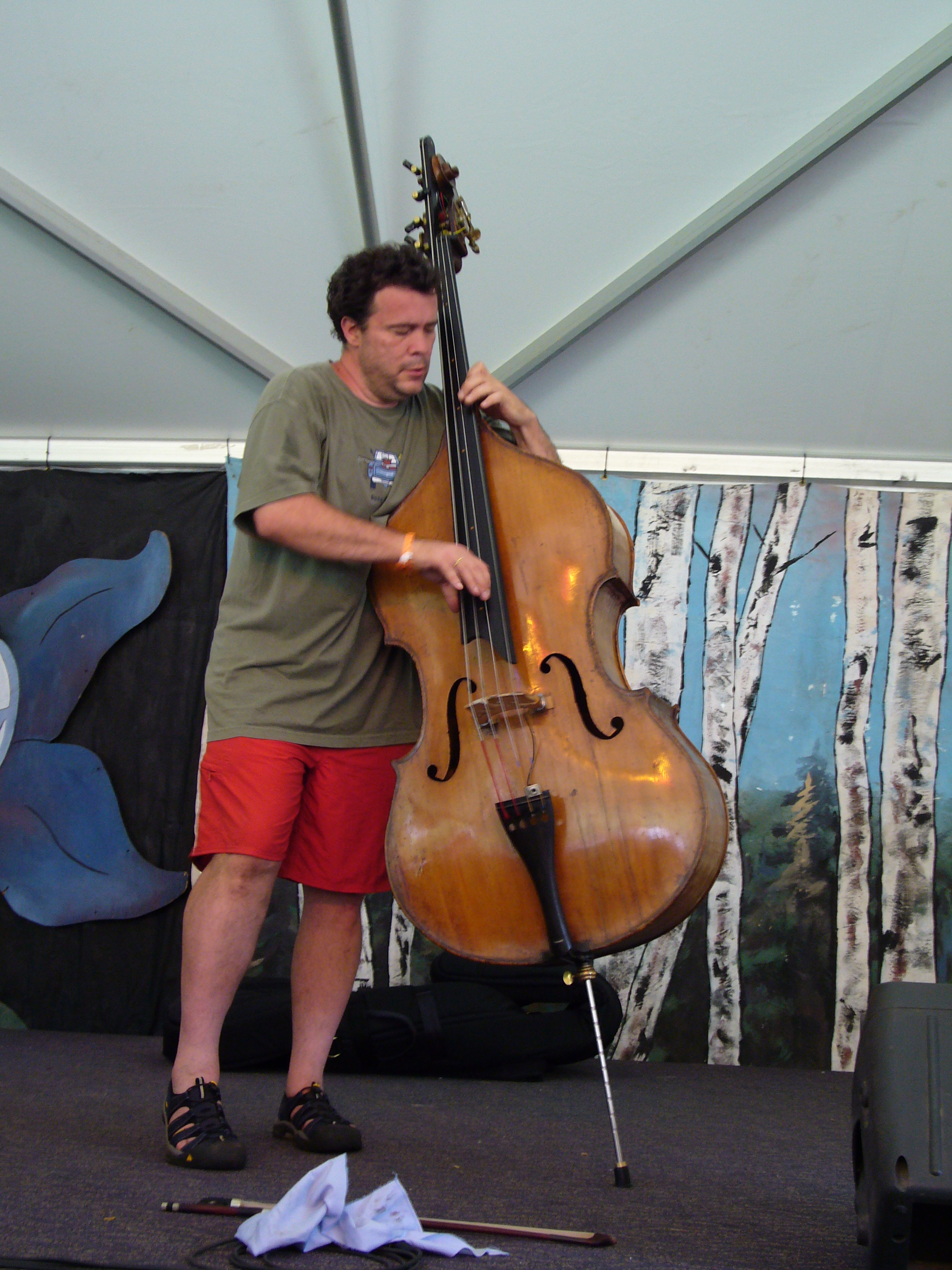

Background information
- Born: November 24, 1960 (age 65)
- Origin: Oak Ridge, Tennessee, United States
- Genres: Classical; bluegrass; progressive bluegrass; jazz; world music
- Occupations: Musician; composer
- Instrument: Double bass
- Labels: Sony; Deutsche Grammophon; Sugar Hill
- Website: edgarmeyer.com

Edgar Meyer (born November 24, 1960) is an American bassist and composer. His styles include classical, bluegrass, newgrass, and jazz. He has won seven Grammy Awards and been nominated ten times.

Meyer is a member of the Telluride Bluegrass Festival's "house band" super group, along with Sam Bush, Béla Fleck, Jerry Douglas, Stuart Duncan, and Bryan Sutton. His collaborators have spanned a wide range of musical styles and talents; among them are Joshua Bell, Hilary Hahn, Yo-Yo Ma, Tessa Lark, Jerry Douglas, Béla Fleck, Zakir Hussain, Sam Bush, Stuart Duncan, Chris Thile, Mike Marshall, Mark O'Connor, Christian McBride, and Emanuel Ax.

== Early life ==
Meyer grew up in Oak Ridge, Tennessee, where he attended Oak Ridge High School. He learned to play the double bass from his father, Edgar Meyer Sr., who directed the string orchestra program for the local public school system. Meyer later went on to Indiana University School of Music to study with Stuart Sankey. He graduated in 1984 with a Bachelor of Music (BM).

== Career ==
As a composer, Meyer's music has been premiered and recorded by Emanuel Ax, Joshua Bell, Yo-Yo Ma, the Boston Symphony Orchestra, Bela Fleck, Zakir Hussain, Hilary Hahn, and the Emerson String Quartet, among others. The Nashville Symphony and the Aspen Music Festival and School commissioned his first purely orchestral work which was premiered by the Nashville Symphony in March 2017. Additionally, Bravo! Vail and The Academy of St. Martin in the Fields commissioned an Overture for Violin and Orchestra that was premiered by Joshua Bell and ASMF in June 2017.

In 2011, Meyer collaborated on The Goat Rodeo Sessions with Yo-Yo Ma, Stuart Duncan, and Chris Thile. The album won two 2013 Grammy Awards. Meyer was honored with his fifth Grammy Award in 2015 for his Bass & Mandolin, recording with Thile. Meyer recorded a collection of Bach trios with Thile and Yo-Yo Ma, released in April 2017. In June 2020, the same group of musicians who recorded The Goat Rodeo Sessions released a second album entitled Not Our First Goat Rodeo.

Meyer is Artist in Residence at Vanderbilt University's Blair School of Music and is on faculty at the Curtis Institute of Music. At Curtis, Meyer taught Punch Brothers bassist and composer Paul Kowert.

== Personal life ==
Edgar Meyer is married to violinist Connie (Cornelia) Heard, and they have one son, George Meyer, who plays the violin.

== Discography ==
=== Solo work ===
- Unfolding (MCA, 1986)
- Dreams of Flight (MCA, 1987)
- Love of a Lifetime (MCA, 1988)
- Work in Progress (MCA, 1990)
- Bach: Unaccompanied Cello Suites Performed on Double Bass (Sony Classical, 2000)
- Meyer and Bottesini: Concertos (Sony Classical, 2002) – rec. 1998–1999
- Edgar Meyer (Sony Classical, 2006) – rec. 2004–2005

=== As a member ===
Strength in Numbers

- Telluride Sessions (MCA, 1989)

=== Collaborations ===
With Yo-Yo Ma and Mark O'Connor

- Appalachia Waltz (Sony Classical, 1996) – rec. 1995
- Appalachian Journey (Sony Classical, 2000) – rec. 1999. Won Grammy Award for Best Classical Crossover Album

With Yo-Yo Ma, Stuart Duncan and Chris Thile

- The Goat Rodeo Sessions (Sony Masterworks, 2011) – Won the Grammy Award for Best Folk Album and the Grammy Award for Best Engineered Album, Non-Classical
- Not Our First Goat Rodeo (Sony Masterworks, 2020) – rec. 2019

With Yo-Yo Ma and Chris Thile

- Bach Trios (Nonesuch, 2017) – rec. 2016

With Chris Thile

- Edgar Meyer and Chris Thile (Nonesuch, 2008)
- Bass & Mandolin (Nonesuch, 2014) – Won Grammy Award for Best Contemporary Instrumental Album

With Béla Fleck

- Perpetual Motion (Sony Classical, 2001) – Won two Grammys
- Music for Two (Sony Classical, 2004) – live rec. 2001–2002

With Béla Fleck and Mike Marshall

- Uncommon Ritual (Sony Classical, 1997) – rec. 1996–1997

With Béla Fleck and Zakir Hussain

- The Melody of Rhythm – Triple Concerto & Music for Trio (Koch, 2009)

With Jerry Douglas and Russ Barenberg

- Skip, Hop and Wobble (Sugar Hill, 1993)

With Jerry Douglas and Vishwa Mohan Bhatt

- Bourbon and Rosewater (Water Lily Acoustics, 1995) – rec. 1994

With Emanuel Ax, Pamela Frank, Rebeca Young and Yo-Yo Ma

- Schubert: Quintet, Op. 114 "The Trout" (Sony Classical, 1996)

With the Emerson String Quartet

- Quintet (Deutsche Grammophon, 1998)

Wiith Joshua Bell

- Short Trip Home (Sony Classical, 1999) – also with Sam Bush and Mike Marshall. Grammy nominated. rec. 1998.

With Christian McBride

- But Who's Gonna Play the Melody? (Mack Avenue, 2024) – rec. 2019–2022

Other collaborations

- Béla Fleck, Double Time (Rounder, 1984) – on the song "Lowdown" rec. 1982
- The Modern Mandolin Quartet, The Nutcracker Suite (Windham Hill, 1991) – composed "Winter's Chill"
- David Grisman, Dawg Duos (Acoustic Disc, 1999)
- Hilary Hahn, Hugh Wolff, The Saint Paul Chamber Orchestra, Meyer Violin Concertos (Sony Classical, 2000) – composed
