= Béla Fleck =

American banjo player (born 1958)

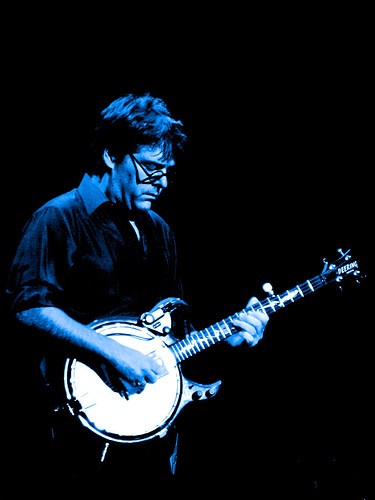
- Fleck performing on February 9, 2007

Background information
- Born: Béla Anton Leoš Fleck; July 10, 1958 (age 68); New York City, U.S.
- Genres: Jazz; jazz fusion; bluegrass; folk; classical; world; folk rock
- Occupations: Musician; songwriter; composer
- Instruments: Banjo; guitar; synthesizers
- Works: Béla Fleck discography
- Years active: 1976–present
- Labels: Rounder; Warner Bros.; Sony Classical; Rhino
- Member of: Béla Fleck and the Flecktones; Sparrow Quartet
- Formerly of: New Grass Revival; Tasty Licks; Spectrum
- Website: belafleck.com

Béla Anton Leoš Fleck (/ˈbɛɪlə/ BAY-lə; born July 10, 1958) is an American virtuoso banjo player whose work blends bluegrass with other genres, including jazz, and who is known for his work with the bands New Grass Revival and Béla Fleck and the Flecktones. Fleck has won 18 Grammy Awards and been nominated 41 times.

In 2020, he was inducted into the International Bluegrass Music Hall of Fame as a member of New Grass Revival.

== Early life, family and education ==
Béla Anton Leoš Fleck was born into a Jewish family in New York City. He was named after three classical composers his father admired: the Hungarian Béla Bartók, the Austrian Anton Webern, and the Czech Leoš Janáček. The father left the family when Béla was a year old. They did not meet again until Béla was in his 40s. Bela's mother remarried; her new husband played cello.

Fleck was drawn to the banjo at a young age when he heard Earl Scruggs play the theme song for The Beverly Hillbillies television show, and when he heard "Dueling Banjos" by Eric Weissberg and Steve Mandell on the radio. At the age of 15, while visiting his grandparents in New Jersey, he received his first banjo, which his grandfather had found at a garage sale. During the train ride home, a man who was waiting for the train tuned the banjo for him, and suggested he learn to play from the book How to Play the Five String Banjo by Pete Seeger. Fleck attended the High School of Music & Art in New York City, where he played French horn until he flunked and was transferred to the choir. He spent most of his time on the banjo; he studied the book Bluegrass Banjo by Pete Wernick, and took lessons from Erik Darling, Marc Horowitz, and Tony Trischka.

== Career ==
=== Early career ===
After graduating from high school, he moved to New York City and became a member of the bluegrass group Tasty Licks, with whom he recorded two albums. He released his debut solo album, Crossing the Tracks (1979), and it was chosen Best Overall Album by the readers of Frets magazine.

Fleck played on the streets of New York City with bassist Mark Schatz. Along with guitarist Glen Lawson and mandolinist Jimmy Gaudreau, they formed Spectrum in 1981. That same year, Béla Fleck, accompanied by the other musicians from Spectrum, participated in the album “Fiddle Tunes for Banjo” with Tony Trischka and Bill Keith, for Rounder). Later, Sam Bush asked Fleck to join New Grass Revival, with whom Fleck would perform for nine years. In 1984, he played on the album Snakes Alive!, by the Dreadful Snakes (Rounder 0177), along with Jerry Douglas, Roland White and Blaine Sprouse. During this time, in 1987 Fleck recorded another solo album, Drive, which was nominated for a Grammy Award in 1988 for Best Bluegrass Album. During the 1980s Fleck and Bush also performed live with Doc and Merle Watson in bluegrass festivals, most notably the annual Telluride Bluegrass Festival. Bela also played with Jerry Garcia at the Hearst Greek Theatre, on August 5, 1990.

=== Béla Fleck and the Flecktones ===
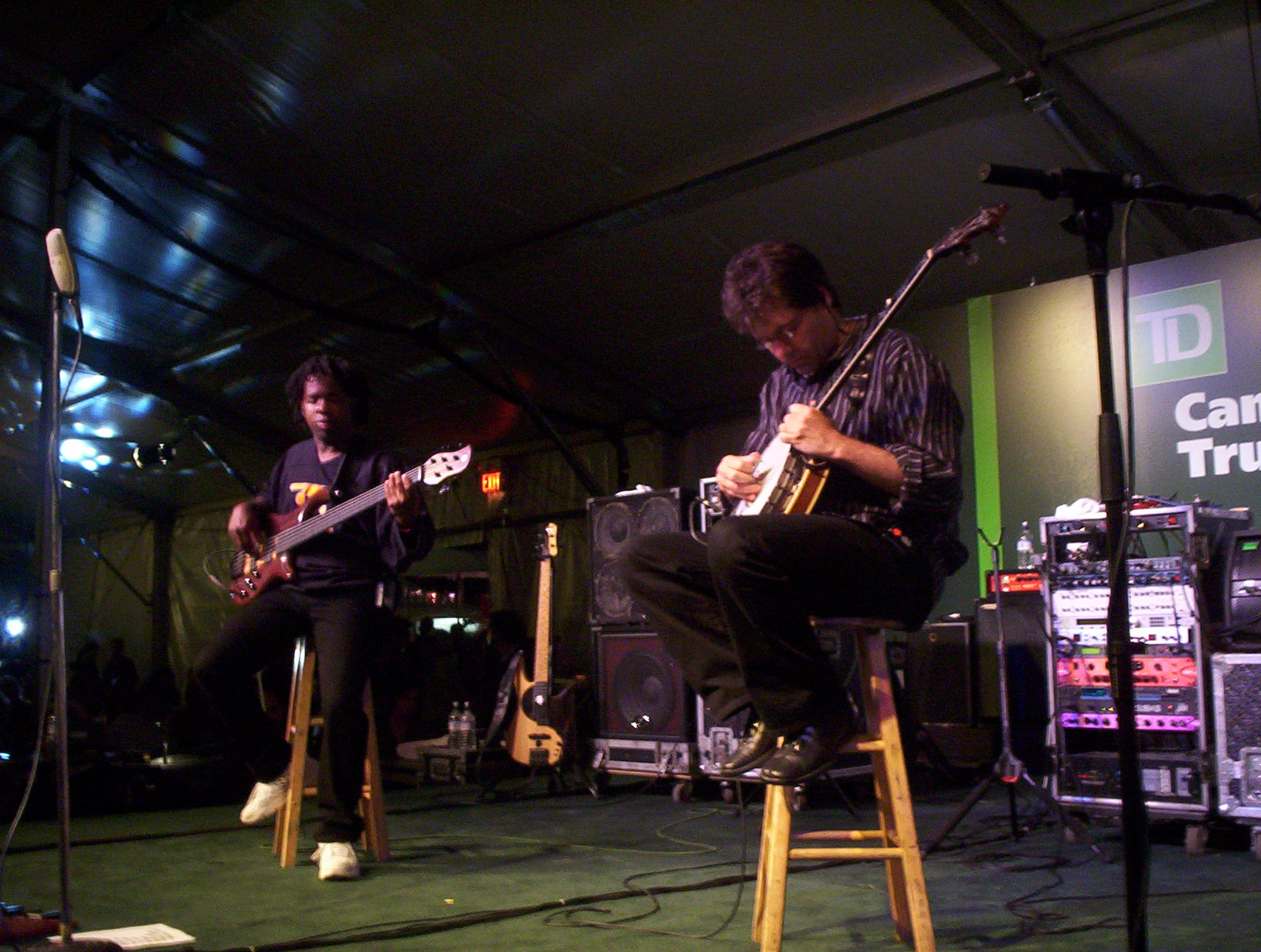
Fleck (right) with Victor Wooten

In 1988, Fleck and Victor Wooten formed Béla Fleck and the Flecktones with keyboardist and harmonica player Howard Levy and Wooten's brother, Roy "Future Man" Wooten, who played synthesizer-based percussion. They recorded numerous albums, most notably Flight of the Cosmic Hippo, their second album, which reached number one on the Billboard Top Contemporary Jazz Albums chart and found increased popularity among fans of jazz fusion.

Levy left the group in 1992, making the band a trio until saxophonist Jeff Coffin joined the group onstage in 1997. His first studio recording with the band was their 1998 album, Left of Cool. Coffin left the group in 2008 to replace the Dave Matthews Band's saxophonist, the late LeRoi Moore. Levy returned to the Flecktones in 2009. Béla Fleck and the original Flecktones recorded Rocket Science and toured in 2011.

=== Other music and recordings ===
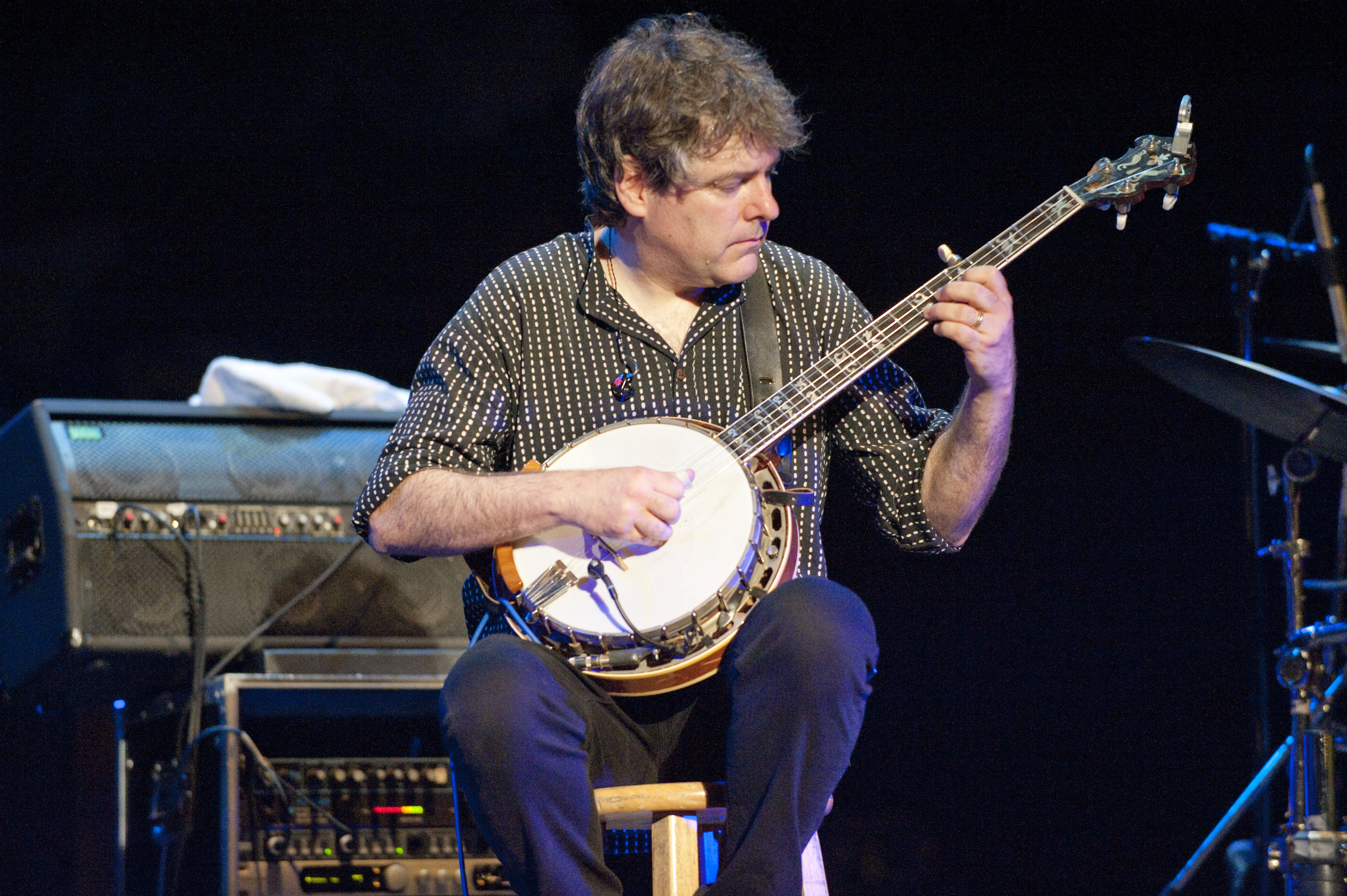
Fleck in Raleigh, North Carolina, June 6, 2011

Fleck played banjo on Before These Crowded Streets by the Dave Matthews Band, including the album's debut single "Don't Drink the Water".

In 1989 Fleck was invited to join the supergroup Strength in Numbers, headed by Sam Bush on mandolin, with Jerry Douglas on resonator guitar (dobro), Edgar Meyer on bass, and Mark O'Connor on violin. The group recorded just one album, The Telluride Sessions, before Bush disbanded the group.

In 2001, he collaborated with Edgar Meyer on Perpetual Motion, an album of classical music played on the banjo. They were accompanied by John Williams, Evelyn Glennie, Joshua Bell, and Gary Hoffman. Perpetual Motion won Grammy Awards for Best Arrangement and Best Classical Crossover Album.

Fleck and Meyer composed a double concerto for banjo and bass and performed its debut with the Nashville Symphony Orchestra. They were commissioned by the Orchestra to compose a trio concerto, for which they invited Indian tabla player Zakir Hussain. The concerto debuted in Nashville in 2006 when it was recorded for the album The Melody of Rhythm. Fleck premiered the Concerto for Banjo in Nashville, Tennessee on September 22, 2011, performing it with the full Nashville Symphony Orchestra.

In 2005, while the Flecktones were on hiatus, Fleck undertook several new projects: recording with traditional African musicians; co-writing the documentary Bring it Home about the Flecktones; co-producing Song of the Traveling Daughter, the debut album by his wife, Abigail Washburn; forming the acoustic fusion supergroup Trio! with Jean-Luc Ponty and Stanley Clarke; and recording an album as a member of the Sparrow Quartet with Washburn, Ben Sollee, and Casey Driessen.

He appeared on the cover of the July/August 2013 issue of Making Music magazine.

Alone and with the Flecktones, Fleck has appeared at the High Sierra Music Festival, Telluride Bluegrass Festival, Merlefest, Montreal International Jazz Festival, Toronto Jazz Festival, Newport Folk Festival, Delfest, Austin City Limits Music Festival, Shakori Hills, Bonnaroo, New Orleans Jazz Fest, Hardly Strictly Bluegrass, Strawberry Music Festival, and Rochester International Jazz Festival.

Fleck is the subject of a documentary film. In Throw Down Your Heart (2008), a film crew follows him on his travels in Africa where he collaborates with some of the best musicians and researches the African origins of the banjo. In a New York Times article about the film, Stephen Holden writes: "At every stop on a journey that takes him from Uganda to Tanzania to Gambia and finally to Mali, Mr. Fleck plays and records with gifted local musicians. Early in the film, a Ugandan villager insists that the common perception of Africa as a continent ravaged by war and disease is 'just a very small bit of what Africa is,' and Throw Down Your Heart sets out to prove him right."

== Personal life ==
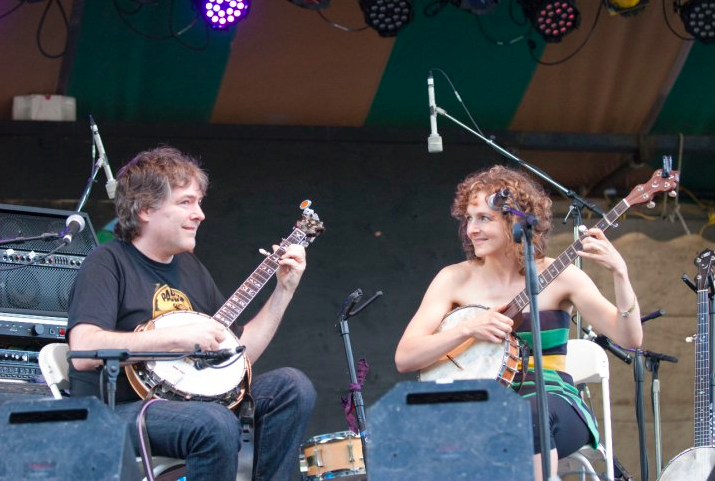
Fleck and his wife Abigail Washburn play a duet at Shakori Hills Festival in 2010

Fleck is married to banjo player Abigail Washburn. Washburn first met Fleck in Nashville at a square dance at which she was dancing and he was playing. Fleck produced Washburn's first solo album. Fleck brought Washburn to the wedding of his half-brother, award-winning children's television writer Sascha Paladino, in August 2007, and they played in a scratch band composed of wedding party members. In May 2009, the Bluegrass Intelligencer website satirized the upcoming "strategic marriage" of Washburn and Fleck, joking that the couple promised a "male heir" who will be the "Holy Banjo Emperor."

Fleck and Washburn have two sons, born 2013 and 2018.

== Accolades ==
=== Grammy Awards and nominations ===
Fleck has shared Grammy Awards with Asleep at the Wheel, Alison Brown, and Edgar Meyer. He has been nominated in more categories than any other musician, namely country, pop, jazz, bluegrass, classical, folk, spoken word, composition, and arranging.

| Year | Category | Nominated work | Result |
|---|---|---|---|
| 1987 | Best Country Instrumental Performance (Orchestra, Group or Soloist) | "Seven by Seven" (by New Grass Revival) | Nominated |
| 1989 | Best Bluegrass Recording (Vocal or Instrumental) | Drive | Nominated |
| 1990 | Best Country Instrumental Performance (Orchestra, Group or Soloist) | "Big Foot" (by New Grass Revival) | Nominated |
| 1991 | Best Instrumental Composition | "The Sinister Minister" | Nominated |
| 1992 | Best Instrumental Composition | "Blu-Bop" | Nominated |
| 1992 | Best Contemporary Jazz Performance | Flight of the Cosmic Hippo (by Béla Fleck and the Flecktones) | Nominated |
| 1993 | Best Instrumental Composition | "Magic Fingers" | Nominated |
| 1995 | Best Spoken Word Album for Children | The Creation (as producer) | Nominated |
| 1996 | Best Country Instrumental Performance | "Hightower" (with Asleep at the Wheel and Johnny Gimble) | Won |
| 1996 | Best Country Instrumental Performance | "Cheeseballs in Cowtown" | Nominated |
| 1997 | Best World Music Album | Tabula Rasā (with V.M. Bhatt and Jiebing Chen) | Nominated |
| 1997 | Best Pop Instrumental Performance | "The Sinister Minister" (by Béla Fleck and the Flecktones) | Won |
| 1999 | Best Pop Instrumental Performance | "Big Country" | Nominated |
| 1999 | Best Instrumental Composition | "Almost 12" (by Béla Fleck and the Flecktones) | Won |
| 1999 | Best Country Instrumental Performance | "The Ride" | Nominated |
| 2000 | Best Bluegrass Album | The Bluegrass Sessions - Tales From The Acoustic Planet, Volume 2 | Nominated |
| 2001 | Best Country Instrumental Performance | "Leaving Cottondale" (with Alison Brown) | Won |
| 2001 | Best Pop Instrumental Performance | "Zona Mona" | Nominated |
| 2001 | Best Contemporary Jazz Album | Outbound (by Béla Fleck and the Flecktones) | Won |
| 2002 | Best Instrumental Arrangement | "Claude Debussy: Doctor Gradus Ad Parnassum" (with Edgar Meyer) | Won |
| 2002 | Best Classical Crossover Album | Perpetual Motion | Won |
| 2003 | Best Country Instrumental Performance | "Bear Mountain Hop" | Nominated |
| 2006 | Best Country Instrumental Performance | "Who's Your Uncle?" | Nominated |
| 2007 | Best Contemporary Jazz Album | The Hidden Land (by Béla Fleck and the Flecktones) | Won |
| 2007 | Best Pop Instrumental Performance | "Subterfuge" (by Béla Fleck and the Flecktones) | Nominated |
| 2008 | Best Instrumental Composition | "Spectacle" | Nominated |
| 2009 | Best Pop Instrumental Album | Jingle All the Way (by Béla Fleck and the Flecktones) | Won |
| 2009 | Best Country Instrumental Performance | "Sleigh Ride" (by Béla Fleck and the Flecktones) | Nominated |
| 2010 | Best Pop Instrumental Performance | "Throw Down Your Heart" | Won |
| 2010 | Best Classical Crossover Album | The Melody of Rhythm | Nominated |
| 2010 | Best Contemporary World Music Album | Throw Down Your Heart: Tales from the Acoustic Planet, Vol. 3 - Africa Sessions | Won |
| 2011 | Best Contemporary World Music Album | Throw Down Your Heart: Africa Sessions Part 2: Unreleased Tracks | Won |
| 2012 | Best Instrumental Composition | "Life in Eleven" (with Howard Levy) | Won |
| 2016 | Best Folk Album | Béla Fleck And Abigail Washburn (with Abigail Washburn) | Won |
| 2016 | Best American Roots Performance | "And Am I Born to Die" (with Abigail Washburn) | Nominated |
| 2021 | Best Historical Album | Throw Down Your Heart: The Complete Africa Sessions | Nominated |
| 2022 | Best Bluegrass Album | My Bluegrass Heart | Won |
| 2024 | Best Contemporary Instrumental Album | As We Speak (with Edgar Meyer & Zakir Hussain) | Won |
| 2024 | Best Global Music Performance | "Pashto" (with Edgar Meyer & Zakir Hussain) | Won |
| 2026 | Best Contemporary Instrumental Album | BEATrio (with Edmar Castañeda, & Antonio Sánchez) | . Pending |
