= Greatest Hits of the 20th Century =

Greatest hits album by Béla Fleck and the Flecktones
- Released: November 16, 1999
- Genres: Jazz fusion, folk rock, post-bop
- Length: 52:06
- Label: Warner Bros.
- Producers: Béla Fleck, Roy Wooten

Béla Fleck and the Flecktones chronology
| Left Of Cool (1998) | Greatest Hits of the 20th Century (1999) | Outbound (2000) |

Greatest Hits of the 20th Century is the seventh album released by Béla Fleck and the Flecktones and their first greatest hits compilation album.

== Reception ==
Professional ratings
Review scores
| Source | Rating |
|---|---|
| Allmusic | 4/5 stars |

In her Allmusic review, music critic Stacia Proefrock wrote "There isn't a dud in the bunch of this concise history of the Flecktones. An inventive blend of a world of influences, this collection offers an extremely pleasant listening experience."

== Track listing ==
All tracks are written by Béla Fleck, except where noted.

| No. | Title | Writer(s) | Original release | Length |
|---|---|---|---|---|
| 1. | "The Sinister Minister" | | Béla Fleck and the Flecktones (1990) | 4:37 |
| 2. | "Stomping Grounds" | Victor Wooten, Fleck | Live Art (1996) | 5:26 |
| 3. | "Flight Of The Cosmic Hippo" | | Flight of the Cosmic Hippo (1991) | 4:28 |
| 4. | "Shocktime" | | previously unreleased | 4:25 |
| 5. | "Sex In A Pan" | Wooten | UFO Tofu (1992) | 3:34 |
| 6. | "The Yee-Haw Factor" | | UFO Tofu | 6:58 |
| 7. | "Road House Blues" | | previously unreleased | 3:19 |
| 8. | "Vix 9" | Wooten | Three Flew Over the Cuckoo's Nest (1993) | 4:29 |
| 9. | "Communication" | music: Fleck, Future Man; lyrics: Fleck | Left of Cool (1998) | 4:16 |
| 10. | "Big Country" | | Left of Cool | 5:33 |
| 11. | "Sunset Road" | | Béla Fleck and the Flecktones | 5:01 |

== Personnel ==
=== The Flecktones ===
- Béla Fleck - Banjo (tracks 1–3, 5, 6, 9, 11), slide banjo (track 7), Deering Crossfire electric banjo (tracks 4, 8), low-tuned Czech electric banjo (track 10), synths (tracks 4, 10), sustain pedal (track 8), Paradis Stereo Guitar with VG8 (track 9)
- Future Man - Synth-Axe Drumitar, Vocals (track 9)
- Howard Levy - Synthesizer (track 1, 3, 11), Piano (track 3, 11), Hammond B3 Organ (track 6), Harmonica (tracks 1, 5, 6), synth (track 1), harp in a cup (track 3), Güiro (track 1)
- Victor Wooten - Bass (tracks 1, 2, 4–9, 11), stereo effect (tracks 5, 8), fretless bass (tracks 3, 10)
- Jeff Coffin - Soprano Saxophone (tracks 9, 10), Alto Saxophone (track 7), Tenor Saxophone (track 10)

=== Guest musicians ===
- Sam Bush - Mandolin on track 2 and 7, Fiddle on track 7
- Paul McCandless - soprano saxophone on track 2
- Dave Matthews - Vocals on track 9
