= Little Worlds =

Album by Béla Fleck and the Flecktones

Studio album by Béla Fleck and the Flecktones
- Released: August 12, 2003
- Genre: Jazz fusion, progressive bluegrass, psychedelic folk, world fusion
- Length: 153:32
- Label: Columbia
- Producer: Béla Fleck

Béla Fleck and the Flecktones chronology
| Live at the Quick (2002) | Little Worlds (2003) | The Hidden Land (2006) |

Little Worlds is the tenth album by Béla Fleck and the Flecktones, released in 2003. The album was released as a 3-disc set. Ten tracks from the set were also released on a single disc called Ten from Little Worlds.

The album contains several tracks that are hidden at the beginning and end of Disc One and at the end of Disc Three. These hidden tracks present a short and humorous story of two men, voiced by Yankees outfielder Bernie Williams and Michael McKean (as David St. Hubbins of Spinal Tap), stuck in traffic and flipping through different radio stations. The songs they hear are songs from the album played in different styles and on different instruments. For example, the slow and soothing song "Poindexter" is featured but redone as a heavy metal song with each band member playing an instrument different from his ordinary one. The redone version is also complete with rhythmic screaming to which one of the men listening in the car makes the comment "I don't even know what they are saying."

== Reception ==
Professional ratings
Review scores
| Source | Rating |
|---|---|
| Allmusic | 2/5 stars |
| All About Jazz | 3.5/5 stars |
| Allmusic | 2.5/5 stars |

In his Allmusic review, music critic Zac Johnson wrote the "three-CD concept album has ambitious intentions, but ultimately ends up feeling a bit scattered... Still, every note is impeccably played and pristinely recorded, and those Flecktones fans who like to pull apart their extremely technical pieces of music, analyze them, and put them back together will find hours of rabid discussion on Little Worlds."

Doug Collette, writing for All About Jazz, praised the album's packaging, sound quality and conception: "Lest you think Little Worlds is an exercise in esoteric self-indulgence, pay attention to the way the album flows over the course of the three discs. While much of the early going insinuates itself gently through the recurring use of Celtic melodic themes, there’s a distinct if understated increase in the intensity of the music between the first disc and the second. The appearance of guitarist Derek Trucks... on 'Pineapple Heart' ratchets up the visceral momentum of the music another level altogether, while 'The Last Jam' brings this entire affair to an emphatic climax."

Critic Thom Jurek called the album an "outrageous exercise in self-indulgence... so excessive that Sony issued a single-disc sampler from the set hoping it would sell."

== Track listing ==
Disc one

"Bil Mon" is preceded by a pregap hidden track.

1. "Bil Mon" (Bill Monroe/The Flecktones) – 8:42
2. "The Ballad of Jed Clampett" (with Bobby McFerrin Divinity Roxx and Sam Bush) (Paul Henning) – 4:06
3. "Puffy" (The Flecktones) – 6:45
4. "New Math" (Béla Fleck/Roy Wooten) – 6:59
5. "Longitude" (Victor Wooten/B. Fleck) – 3:04
6. "Latitude" (V. Wooten/B. Fleck) – 5:04
7. "Centrifuge" (with Derek Trucks) (The Flecktones) – 2:05
8. "Off the Top (The Gravity Wheel)" (with Nickel Creek) (B. Fleck) – 4:54
9. "Off the Top (Line Dance)" (with Nickel Creek) (B. Fleck) – 4:55
  "Hidden Track/Follow the Line" – 0:48

Disc two

10. "The Fjords of Oslo" (The Flecktones) – 0:41
11. "Sherpa" (with Bobby McFerrin) (Jeff Coffin) – 5:20
12. "What It Is" (with Bobby McFerrin) (B. Fleck/Bobby McFerrin) – 3:41
13. "The Leaning Tower" (with The Chieftains) (B. Fleck) – 6:06
14. "Mudslingers of the Milky Way" (B. Fleck) – 6:14
15. "Captive Delusions" (with Branford Marsalis) (B. Fleck) – 3:54
16. "Costa Brava" (B. Fleck) – 8:23
17. "Poindexter" (with Jerry Douglas) (B. Fleck) – 5:38
18. "Prequel" (B. Fleck) – 3:14
19. "Return of the Mudslingers" (with Branford Marsalis) (B. Fleck) – 2:50

Disc three

20. "The Cave" (R. Wooten) – 1:35
21. "Next" (B. Fleck/V. Wooten) – 5:56
22. "Pineapple Heart" (with Derek Trucks/Sam Bush) (B. Fleck) – 5:06
23. "Snatchin'" (J. Coffin) – 4:47
24. "Reminiscence" (V. Wooten) – 5:33
25. "Sleeper" (with Bobby McFerrin) (B. Fleck) – 12:16
26. "Flunky" (B. Fleck) – 0:39
27. "The Last Jam" (with Derek Trucks/Jerry Douglas/Bernie Williams) (The Flecktones) – 4:26
  Hidden Track/The End – 1:11

== Personnel ==
The Flecktones

- Béla Fleck – banjo (tracks 3, 6, 8, 9, 11–13, 16–18, 21, 22, 24–27), gut string banjo (track 14), electric banjo (tracks 1, 6, 7, 11, 13, 16, 19, 23), synth (tracks 1, 2, 4, 6, 11, 13, 23), reverse banjo (track 5), piano (track 10), vocals (track 10)
- Jeff Coffin – tenor saxophone (tracks 6, 8, 9, 11, 14, 15, 19, 21, 23, 25, 26), soprano saxophone (tracks 1, 3, 13, 16, 24, 27), alto saxophone (tracks 2, 8, 9), flute (tracks 17, 25, 27), alto flute (tracks 4, 22), clarinet (track 6), bass clarinet (track 7), Low D whistle (track 10), Low F whistle (track 25), didgeridoo (track 25), synthesizer (tracks 2, 3, 11, 16, 22, 23, 25, 27), finger cymbals (track 1), harmonizer (track 23), whistling (tracks 10, 25)
- Future Man – Synth-Axe Drumitar (tracks 1–4, 6, 8–11, 13, 14, 16, 17, 21–25, 27), X-Drum acoustic kick (tracks 1, 3, 4, 6, 11, 16, 24, 25, 27), acoustic drums and cymbals (tracks 4, 6, 11, 16, 25), acoustic percussion (track 18), cajón (tracks 6, 17, 19, 24, 27), Mexican hand drum (track 16), gong (track 1), acoustic shakers (track 13), Roy-El Piano (tracks 7, 20, 26), sustain pedal (track 26), vocals (tracks 3, 7, 10)
- Victor Wooten – bass (tracks 2–11, 16, 23, 24), six string bass (tracks 14, 21, 25), fretless bass (tracks 1, 11, 13, 22, 27), tenor basses (track 17), acoustic hollow-body bass guitar (track 26), upright bass (tracks 6, 11, 17, 27), cello (track 21), synthesizer (tracks 21), Roland Sound Canvas (track 1), foot pedal synth (track 23), vocals (track 10)

Guest artists

- Derek Bell – Irish harp (tracks 13, 25)
- Paul Brantley – cello (tracks 4, 25)
- Sandip Burman – tabla (track 25), vocals (track 25)
- Sam Bush – mandolin (tracks 2, 22)
- Thetakudi Harihara Subash Chandran – vocals (track 25), jaw harp (track 25), ghatam (tracks 21, 25)
- Kevin Conneff – vocals (track 25), bodhran (track 13)
- Jerry Douglas – dobro (tracks 17, 27), lap steel guitar (track 17)
- Feng Xiu Hong – vocals (track 25)
- Sean Keane – fiddle (tracks 13, 25)
- Kanjira Ganesh Kumar – kanjira (tracks 21, 25), vocals (track 25)
- Pamelia Kurstin – theremin (tracks 4, 11, 25), theremins (tracks 3, 24), triple theremin (track 14)
- Branford Marsalis – soprano saxophone (tracks 11, 15, 19)
- Bobby McFerrin – vocals (tracks 2, 11, 12, 25)
- Matt Molloy – Irish flute (tracks 13, 25)
- Paddy Moloney – Uilleann pipes (tracks 4, 13)
- Cyrus Niccore – didjeridoo (tracks 1, 4, 18, 27)
- Congar Ol Ondar – Tuvan throat singing (track 21)
- Divinity Roxx – vocals (track 2)
- Jake Shimabukuro – ukulele (tracks 25, 27)
- Chris Thile – mandolin (tracks 8, 9, 16)
- Derek Trucks – electric slide guitar (tracks 22, 27), electric slide guitars (track 7)
- Sara Watkins – fiddle (tracks 2, 8, 9)
- Sean Watkins – guitar (tracks 8, 9)
- Bernie Williams – guitar (track 27)
- Joe Wooten – theremin (tracks 7, 14, 22, 27), wah-wah pedal (track 7)

== Ten from Little Worlds ==
Ten from Little Worlds

Studio album by Béla Fleck and the Flecktones
- Released: August 12, 2003
- Genre: Jazz
- Length: 52:59
- Label: Columbia
- Producer: Béla Fleck

Béla Fleck and the Flecktones chronology
| Live at the Quick (2002) | Ten from Little Worlds (2003) | The Hidden Land (2006) |

At the request of their record label, the Flecktones released a regular-length album simultaneously with the three-disc set. The shorter version, entitled Ten from Little Worlds, contains highlights from the full album, and is only one disc long. Tracks 1, 2, 5, 9 & 10 are edited versions of the originals. The music file of Bil Mon is titled Big Mon.

In his Allmusic review, music critic Zac Johnson wrote "While the full work seems a little disjointed and too expansive, the ten-song collection is a little more digestible... the unfortunate hip-hop version of Flatt & Scruggs' 'Ballad of Jed Clampett' never needed to be recorded."

1. "Bil Mon" (B. Monroe, The Flecktones) – 7:13
  - Bela Fleck: electric synth banjo
  - Jeff Coffin: soprano sax, finger cymbals
  - Victor Wooten: fretless bass, Roland Sound Canvas
  - Roy Wooten: Synth-Axe Drumitar, X-Drum acoustic kick, gong
  - Cyrus Niccore: didjeridoo
2. "Ballad of Jed Clampett" (P. Henning) – 3:55
  - Bela Fleck: banjo
  - Jeff Coffin: alto sax, keyboard
  - Victor Wooten: bass
  - Roy Wooten: Synth-Axe Drumitar
  - Sam Bush: mandolin
  - Bobby McFerrin: vocals
  - Divinity Roxx: vocals
  - Sara Watkins: fiddle
3. "Pineapple Heart" (B. Fleck)
  - Bela Fleck: banjo
  - Jeff Coffin: alto flute, keyboards
  - Victor Wooten: fretless bass
  - Roy Wooten: Synth-Axe Drumitar
  - Sam Bush: mandolin
  - Derek Trucks: electric guitar
  - Joe Wooten: theremin
4. "Snatchin'" (J. Coffin)
  - Bela Fleck: electric synth banjo
  - Jeff Coffin: tenor sax with harmonizer, keyboards
  - Victor Wooten: bass, foot pedal synth
  - Roy Wooten: Synth-Axe Drumitar
5. "Next" (B. Fleck, V. Wooten)
  - Bela Fleck: banjo
  - Jeff Coffin: tenor sax
  - Victor Wooten: six-string bass, cello, keyboard
  - Roy Wooten: Synth-Axe Drumitar
  - Subasch Chandram: gutam
  - Ganesh Kumar: kanjira
  - Congar Ol Ondar: Tuvan throat singing
6. "The Leaning Tower" (B. Fleck)
  - Bela Fleck: banjo, electric banjo, synth banjo
  - Jeff Coffin: soprano sax
  - Victor Wooten: fretless bass
  - Roy Wooten: Synth-Axe Drumitar, acoustic shakers
  - Derek Bell: Irish harp
  - Kevin Conneff: bodhran
  - Sean Keane: fiddle
  - Matt Molloy: flute
  - Paddy Moloney: Uilleann pipes
7. "Puffy" (The Flecktones) – 6:45
  - Bela Fleck: banjo
  - Jeff Coffin: soprano sax, keyboards
  - Victor Wooten: bass
  - Roy Wooten: Synth-Axe Drumitar, X-Drum acoustic kick, vocals
  - Pamelia Kurstin: theremins
8. "Sherpa" (J. Coffin)
  - Bela Fleck: banjo, electric synth banjo
  - Jeff Coffin: tenor sax, keyboard
  - Victor Wooten: electric bass, electric standup bass
  - Roy Wooten: Synth-Axe Drumitar, X-Drum acoustic kick, acoustic drums and cymbals
  - Pamelia Kurstin: theremin
  - Branford Marsalis: soprano sax
9. "Off the Top (The Gravity Wheel)" (B. Fleck)
  - Bela Fleck: banjo
  - Jeff Coffin: alto sax, tenor sax
  - Victor Wooten: bass
  - Roy Wooten: Synth-Axe Drumitar
  - Chris Thile: mandolin
  - Sarah Watkins: fiddle
  - Sean Watkins: guitar
10. "Off the Top (Line Dance)" (B. Fleck)
  - Bela Fleck: banjo
  - Jeff Coffin: alto sax, tenor sax
  - Victor Wooten: bass
  - Roy Wooten: Synth-Axe Drumitar
  - Chris Thile: mandolin
  - Sarah Watkins: fiddle
  - Sean Watkins: guitar
