= Three Flew Over the Cuckoo's Nest =

Studio album by Béla Fleck and the Flecktones
- Released: September 14, 1993
- Recorded: 1993
- Studio: Javelina (Nashville, Tennessee); Groundstar Labs (Nashville, Tennessee); Record Plant (Los Angeles, California); Capitol (Hollywood, California)
- Genre: Jazz fusion, progressive bluegrass, psychedelic folk
- Length: 56:59
- Label: Warner Bros.
- Producer: Béla Fleck with the Flecktones

Béla Fleck and the Flecktones chronology
UFO Tofu (1992)	Three Flew Over the Cuckoo's Nest (1993)	Live Art (1996)

Three Flew Over the Cuckoo's Nest is the fourth album released by Béla Fleck and the Flecktones, released in 1993. It is the band's only release as a trio, after the departure of Howard Levy but before the arrival of Jeff Coffin.

== Reception ==
Professional ratings
Review scores
Source	Rating
Allmusic	3/5 stars

In his Allmusic review, music critic Dan Cross wrote of the album "The Flecktones have stuck with the formula that made their previous records successful: complex, tight grooves wrapped in a very musical, user-friendly package. The Flecktones still suffer from the departure of keyboardist/harmonica player Howard Levy, who provided the band with needed additional musical colors and textures."

== Track listing ==
1. "Vix 9" (Victor Wooten) – 4:27
2. "At Last We Meet Again" (V. Wooten) – 5:34
3. "Spunky and Clorissa" (Béla Fleck) – 4:30
4. "Bumbershoot" (B. Fleck) – 5:22
5. "Blues For Gordon" (B. Fleck) – 5:16
6. "Monkey See" (B. Fleck) – 3:16
7. "The Message" (music: The Flecktones; lyrics: Joe Wooten) – 4:03
8. "Interlude (Return of the Ancient Ones)" (Future Man) – 2:06
9. "The Drift" (The Flecktones) – 3:30
10. "A Celtic Medley: Meridian/Traveling Light/Salamander's Reel" (B. Fleck) – 6:39
11. "Peace, Be Still" (V. Wooten) – 4:05
12. "The Longing" (B. Fleck) – 5:25
13. "For Now" (B. Fleck) – 2:40

== Personnel ==
- Béla Fleck – Acoustic (tracks 2, 3, 5–7, 10, 12) and electric banjos (tracks 1, 4, 9, 12), gut string banjo (track 11, 13), synth (track 4)
- Future Man – Synth-Axe Drumitar (tracks 1–12)
- Victor Wooten – Bass guitar (tracks 1, 4, 6, 9), fretless bass (tracks 10, 12), tenor bass (tracks 2, 3, 5, 7, 11), stereo effect (tracks 1, 2), vocals (track 7)

Guest musicians

- Bruce Hornsby – piano (tracks 3, 7)
- Branford Marsalis – soprano saxophone (track 9), tenor saxophone (track 7)
- Roderick Ward – alto saxophone (track 10)

== Chart positions ==
Year	Chart	Position
1993	Billboard Top Contemporary Jazz Albums	7
