= Live at the Quick =

Live album by Béla Fleck and the Flecktones
- Released: February 26, 2002
- Recorded: 2000
- Genre: Jazz fusion, newgrass, world fusion
- Length: 76:26
- Label: Columbia
- Producer: Béla Fleck

Béla Fleck and the Flecktones chronology
Outbound (2000)	Live at the Quick (2002)	Little Worlds (2003)

Live at the Quick is the ninth album released by Béla Fleck and the Flecktones and their second live album. It was recorded live at the Quick Center For The Arts in Fairfield, Connecticut in 2000.

== Reception ==
Professional ratings
Review scores
Source	Rating
Allmusic	3/5 stars

In his Allmusic review, music critic Jim Smith called the album "the band's most diverse record yet, and fans of Fleck's post-Acoustic Planet work will be amply rewarded."

== Track listing ==
All tracks composed by Béla Fleck; except where noted.

1. "That Old Thing" (Intro)/"Earth Jam" (Fleck, Future Man, Victor Wooten) – 7:55
2. "Zona Mona" (Jeff Coffin, Fleck) – 6:34
3. "Ovombo Summit" (Future Man) – 2:48
4. "Hall of Mirrors" – 5:42
5. "Scratch & Sniff" (Fleck, Victor Wooten) – 6:43
6. Improv/"Amazing Grace" (John Newton) – 5:18
7. "Big Country" – 8:21
8. "Interlude" (Andy Narell) – 1:26
9. "Lover's Leap" – 6:13
10. "Alash Khem (Alash River Song)" (Traditional) – 2:26
11. "A Moment So Close" – 6:55
12. Improv/"Prelude from Bach Violin Partita #3" (J.S. Bach) – 5:59
13. "Intro" – 1:06
14. "Hoedown" (Aaron Copland) – 9:00

== Personnel ==
=== The Flecktones ===
- Béla Fleck – Gibson TB 75 banjo (tracks 2, 4, 5, 12, 14), Deering Crossfire electric banjo (tracks 1, 9, 14), synth (track 1), low-tuned Czech electric banjo (track 7), Paradis stereo guitar (track 11), vocals (track 13)
- Jeff Coffin – Tenor saxophone (tracks 1, 2, 5, 11, 14), soprano saxophone (tracks 4, 7), alto saxophone (tracks 1, 14), clarinet (track 9)
- Future Man – Synth-Axe Drumitar (tracks 1–5, 7, 9, 11, 14), acoustic percussion (tracks 2–5), cajon (track 3), Zendrum (track 3), vocals (track 11)
- Victor Lemonte Wooten – bass (track 1, 4–6, 9, 11, 14), fretless bass (tracks 2, 7), floor synth (track 5), vocals (tracks 1, 13)

=== Guest musicians ===
- Sandip Burman - tabla (tracks 4, 5, 11, 13, 14), vocals (track 13)
- Paul Hanson - bassoon (tracks 2, 4, 5, 7, 11, 14), synth (track 5), tenor saxophone (track 1)
- Paul McCandless - soprano saxophone (tracks 1, 2, 4, 7, 11, 14), sopranino saxophone (tracks 7, 14), English horn (tracks 9, 11), oboe (track 4), pennywhistle (track 14)
- Andy Narell - steelpans (tracks 2, 5, 7–9, 14), synthesizer (tracks 4, 7, 11)
- Kongar-ool Ondar - Tuvan throat singing (as Congar ol'Ondar) (tracks 10, 11)

== Chart positions ==
Year	Chart	Position
2002	Billboard Top Contemporary Jazz Albums	8
