= Rocket Science (Béla Fleck and the Flecktones album) =

Studio album by Béla Fleck and the Flecktones
- Released: May 17, 2011
- Genre: Jazz fusion, progressive bluegrass, post-bop
- Length: 64:28
- Label: eOne
- Producer: Béla Fleck

Béla Fleck and the Flecktones chronology
Jingle All the Way (2008)	Rocket Science (2011)

Rocket Science is a studio album by Béla Fleck and the Flecktones, released in 2011. It reached number 1 on the Billboard Jazz chart and number 36 on the Top Independent Albums chart. The song "Life in Eleven" won Best Instrumental Composition at the 54th Annual Grammy Awards.

The album is the first since 1992's UFO Tofu to feature founding member Howard Levy in the regular band lineup.

== Reception ==
Professional ratings
Review scores
Source	Rating
AllMusic	4/5 stars

In his AllMusic review, music critic Thom Jurek praised the album, calling the Flecktones re-energized. He wrote "With Levy on harmonica and piano, it's as if he never left. Rather than try to re-create the band's old sound, the Flecktones push ever further into their own seamless, unclassifiable meld of jazz, progressive bluegrass, rock, classical, funk, and world music traditions on this delightful—and at times mind-blowing—record."

== Track listing ==
All songs by Béla Fleck unless otherwise noted.

1. "Gravity Lane" – 5:58
2. "Prickly Pear" – 3:49
3. "Joyful Spring" (Howard Levy) – 2:39
4. "Life In Eleven" (H. Levy/B. Fleck) – 5:25
5. "Falling Forward" – 5:08
6. "Storm Warning" – 7:57
7. "Like Water" (Victor Wooten/B. Fleck) – 4:42
8. "Earthling Parade" – 7:58
9. "The Secret Drawer" (Future Man) – 2:12
10. "Sweet Pomegranates" (H. Levy) – 5:55
11. "Falani" – 6:50
12. "Bottle Rocket" – 5:53

Deluxe Edition

13. "Wolf Laurel" – 6:05

== Personnel ==
- Béla Fleck – 5-string banjo (tracks 1, 3–8, 10–12), Goldtone 10-string Prototype (track 8), Deering Crossfire electric banjo (tracks 2, 6)
- Future Man – drumitar, acoustic drums, percussion
- Howard Levy – diatonic harmonica (tracks 1, 2, 4–8, 11, 12), bass harmonica (track 8), synth (track 2), piano (tracks 1–7, 10, 12)
- Victor Wooten – Fodera 4-string bass, Fodera 5-string NYC bass, Compito 5-string fretless bass (track 5)

Production notes:

- Béla Fleck – producer
- Kevin Dailey – engineer
- Richard Battaglia – engineer
- Richard Dodd – mastering
- Jeremy Cowart – photography
- Sean Marlowe – art direction, design
- Paul Grosso – cover art, creative director
