= Left of Cool =

Studio album by Béla Fleck and the Flecktones
- Released: June 9, 1998
- Recorded: Béla Fleck's house
- Genre: Jazz fusion, progressive folk, progressive bluegrass, world fusion
- Length: 76:22
- Label: Warner Bros.
- Producer: Béla Fleck

Béla Fleck and the Flecktones chronology
Live Art (1996)	Left of Cool (1998)	Greatest Hits of the 20th Century (1999)

Left of Cool is the fifth studio album released by Béla Fleck and the Flecktones, released in 1998.

== History ==
Left of Cool is the first album to feature Jeff Coffin, who had already toured with the band after the departure of Howard Levy. The album cover depicts Future Man, Béla Fleck, and Victor Wooten standing on Coffin's head.

On the Live at the Quick DVD, Fleck describes how, after the melody for "Big Country" came to him, he called his answering machine and sang it so it would not be lost.

A different arrangement of "Sojourn of Arjuna" appears on Victor Wooten's album What Did He Say? released the previous year.

Guests include Dave Matthews and Amy Grant.

Left of Cool is currently the highest-charting Flecktones album to date, reaching #191 on The Billboard 200.

== Reception ==
Professional ratings
Review scores
Source	Rating
Allmusic	2.5/5 stars

In his Allmusic review, music critic Stephen Thomas Erlewine wrote "Often, it's enjoyable to just hear them jam; however, for most fans, the greatest pleasure on Left of Cool will be finding the little details within the solos. The opener, 'Throwdown at the Hoedown', is one of a handful of cuts that really makes a lasting impression."

== Track listing ==
Note: the liner notes swap tracks 6 and 7 & 11 and 12. The list below reflects the tracks as they are ordered on the album itself.

1. "Throwdown At The Hoedown" (Béla Fleck) – 5:09
2. "Communication" (music: B. Fleck/Future Man; lyrics: B. Fleck) – 4:16
3. "Big Country" (B. Fleck) – 5:31
4. "Sojourn Of Arjuna" (music: Victor Wooten/Future Man; lyrics: Future Man, adapted from Bhagavad Gita) – 5:27
5. "Let Me Be The One" (music: V. Wooten/B. Fleck/Future Man; lyrics: B. Fleck) – 4:38
6. "Trane To Conamarra" (B. Fleck/Jeff Coffin) – 6:48
7. "Almost 12" (V. Wooten/B. Fleck/Future Man) – 3:15
8. "Step Quiet" (B. Fleck/Sarah Mason) – 4:02
9. "Oddity" (B. Fleck) – 5:32
10. "Sleeping Dogs Lie" (B. Fleck) – 4:02
11. "Trouble and Strife" (B. Fleck) – 5:15
12. "Slow Walker" (B. Fleck) – 5:23
13. "Shanti" (B. Fleck/J. Coffin) – 5:12
14. "The Big Blink" (B. Fleck) – 7:57
15. "Prelude To Silence" (Future Man) – 3:55

== Personnel ==
=== The Flecktones ===
- Béla Fleck - banjo (tracks 1, 5–7, 11, 12, 14), banjos (track 2), Deering Crossfire electric banjo (tracks 4, 15), low-tuned Czech electric banjo (track 3), synths (tracks 3, 4, 12, 15), nylon and steel string banjos (track 9), gut string Stelling banjo (track 10), Nechville sitar banjo (track 13), mandolin (tracks 8, 9, 11), Paradis stereo guitar with VG8 (tracks 2, 8), guitars (track 6), gut string guitar (track 13), synth guitar (track 14), theremin (track 14)
- Future Man - Synth-Axe Drumitar (tracks 1–9, 11, 12, 14), cajon (tracks 10, 13, 15), leg slaps (track 13), bells (track 15), samples (track 15), vocals (tracks 1, 2, 4–6, 8, 11, 12)
- Victor Wooten - bass (tracks 1, 2, 4, 5, 7–9, 11, 12, 14), fretless bass (tracks 3, 6), tenor bass (track 12), standup bass (track 10), standup electric bass (track 15), cello (track 13), fiddle (track 11)
- Jeff Coffin - soprano saxophone (tracks 2, 3, 6, 8, 10–12), tenor saxophone (tracks 1, 3–5, 14), baritone saxophone (track 5), baritone wah-wah saxophone (track 5), flute (tracks 6, 9, 13), clarinet (track 10), bass clarinet (track 10), saxello (track 9), singing bowl (track 13)

=== Guest musicians ===
- Dave Matthews - vocals on tracks 2 and 11
- Amy Grant - vocals on track 8

== Chart positions ==
Year	Chart	Position
1998	Billboard Heatseekers	6
1998	Billboard The Billboard 200	191
1998	Billboard Top Contemporary Jazz Albums	3
