= Outbound (Béla Fleck and the Flecktones album) =

Studio album by Béla Fleck and the Flecktones
- Released: July 25, 2000
- Genre: Jazz fusion, folk rock, world fusion
- Length: 59:54
- Label: Columbia
- Producer: Béla Fleck with the Flecktones

Béla Fleck and the Flecktones chronology
Greatest Hits of the 20th Century (1999)	Outbound (2000)	Live at the Quick (2002)

Outbound is the eighth album by Béla Fleck and the Flecktones, released in 2000. It is the band's first album on the Sony/Columbia label. The album won Best Contemporary Jazz Album at the 43rd Annual Grammy Awards.

Special guests include Jon Anderson, Adrian Belew, Sandip Burman, Shawn Colvin and Edgar Meyer.

== Reception ==
Professional ratings
Review scores
Source	Rating
Allmusic	3/5 stars

In his Allmusic review, music critic William Ruhlman wrote "Fleck and his bandmates seem to view all styles of music as readily and randomly interchangeable, but sometimes, as with a colorblind person picking out clothes, the results clash or otherwise disturb, and the rest of the time they come off as flashy and insubstantial. Fleck really offers no defense to the charge of being a musical dilettante, he simply celebrates the surface pleasures of different varieties of music, offering an overlapping series of appetizers. A fan of any particular style is liable to feel that it has been trivialized, but Fleck doesn't mean any harm. His music represents the pursuit of facileness as a musical goal, one that he and his band achieve with alacrity."

== Track listing ==
All songs by Béla Fleck unless otherwise noted.

1. "Intro" – 0:41
2. "Hoedown" (Aaron Copland) – 4:54
3. "A Moment So Close" – 4:47
4. "Zona Mona" (Fleck, Jeff Coffin) – 5:01
5. "Hall Of Mirrors" – 4:54
6. "Earth Jam" (Fleck, Future Man, Victor Wooten) – 5:55
7. "Something She Said" – 3:36
8. "Ovombo Summit" (Future Man) – 0:40
9. "Aimum" (The Flecktones) – 5:50
10. "Prelude" – 0:41
11. "Lover's Leap" – 4:16
12. "Outbound" – 4:52
13. "Scratch & Sniff" (Fleck, Victor Wooten)– 5:00
14. "Shuba Yatra" – 4:42
15. "That Old Thing" – 3:21
16. "Reprise" – 0:44

== Personnel ==
=== The Flecktones ===
- Béla Fleck – Gibson-style 75 banjo (track 4, 5, 9, 13, 15), Gibson-style 18 acoustic banjo (track 2), gut string banjo (track 11), Deering Crossfire electric banjo (tracks 2, 6, 12), Nechville electric sitar banjo (track 14), synth (tracks 5, 6, 13), National steel guitar (tracks 7, 16), Paradis stereo guitar with VG8 (track 3)
- Jeff Coffin – Tenor saxophone (tracks 2–4, 6, 7, 9, 12, 13), soprano saxophone (4, 5, 12, 14, 15), alto saxophone (tracks 1, 6), alto flute (tracks 7, 9, 14, 16), clarinet (track 11)
- Future Man – Synth-Axe Drumitar (tracks 2–7, 9, 11–15), acoustic percussion (tracks 4, 7, 12, 13, 15), X-Drum acoustic kick drum (tracks 11, 14), Zendrum (track 8), Pear tall cajons (track 8), Roland S-760 samplers (track 8), vocals (track 3, 8)
- Victor Wooten – Fodera 4 string bass (tracks 2, 3, 6, 9, 11–13, 15), Fodera tenor bass (track 2), stereo effect (tracks 2, 12), Compito 5 string fretless bass (tracks 4, 5, 7, 14), vocals (track 6)

=== Guest artists ===
- Jon Anderson – vocals (tracks 3, 9)
- David Angell – violin (tracks 2–4, 11, 13)
- Adrian Belew – electric guitar (tracks 5, 7, 9)
- Sandip Burman – tabla (tracks 2, 3, 6, 9, 14)
- John Catchings – cello (tracks 2–4, 11, 13)
- Shawn Colvin – vocals (tracks 3, 5, 7, 9)
- David Davidson – violin (tracks 2–4, 11, 13)
- Mark Feldman - violin (track 6)
- Paul Hanson – bassoon (tracks 2, 3, 5, 13, 15), harmonizer (track 2), synthesizer (track 13), tenor saxophone (track 1)
- Paul McCandless – soprano saxophone (tracks 1, 3, 4), penny whistle (track 2), oboe (track 5), English horn (track 7)
- John Medeski – Hammond B-3 organ (tracks 5, 8, 9, 12)
- Edgar Meyer – arco (tracks 14, 15) and pizzicato (tracks 15) acoustic basses
- Andy Narell – steelpans (tracks 10–14)
- Kongar-ol Ondar – Tuvan throat singing (track 3)
- Rita Sahai - vocals (tracks 3, 11, 14, 16)
- Kristin Wilkinson - viola (tracks 2–4, 11, 13)

== Chart positions ==
Year	Chart	Position
2000	Billboard Top Contemporary Jazz Albums	3
