= The Hidden Land =

Studio album by Béla Fleck and the Flecktones
- Released: February 14, 2006
- Recorded: Sanctuary Studios
- Genre: Jazz fusion, progressive bluegrass, post-bop, folk rock
- Length: 59:53
- Label: Sony
- Producer: Béla Fleck with the Flecktones

Béla Fleck and the Flecktones chronology
Little Worlds (2003)	The Hidden Land (2006)	Jingle All the Way (2008)

The Hidden Land is the eighth studio album and twelfth album overall released in 2006 by Béla Fleck and the Flecktones. It was recorded before the band's year-long hiatus during 2005 and released afterward. The Hidden Land won the 2007 Grammy Award for Best Contemporary Jazz Album.

== Reception ==
Professional ratings
Review scores
Source	Rating
Allmusic	2.5/5 stars
No Depression	(no rating)

In his Allmusic review, music critic Thom Jurek was indifferent about the album, writing, "It's not that complexity and a multiplicity of ideas is a bad thing; quite the opposite, but knowing when to reign them in [sic] and make the music sing is another thing. This record sings only in a couple of places. The rest is 'serious Flecktones.' Perhaps this determination is simply not for most of us. It's easy to accept that, especially when those serious Flecktones fans will be debating individual musical passages until the next album is released." Devin Grant of No Depression wrote: "Fleck keeps things centered, wielding his banjo in directions the instrument wasn’t originally envisioned to go."

== Track listing ==
All songs by Béla Fleck unless otherwise noted.

1. "Fugue from Prelude/Fugue No. 20 in A minor, BWV 889" (J.S. Bach, arr. The Flecktones) – 1:51
2. "P'Lod In The House" (Future Man/B. Fleck) – 3:46
3. "Rococo" – 3:46
4. "Labyrinth" – 6:21
5. "Kaleidoscope" (The Flecktones) – 5:08
6. "Who's Got Three?" – 5:22
7. "Weed Whacker" – 7:44
8. "Couch Potato" – 3:03
9. "Chennai" (Jeff Coffin/B. Fleck) – 5:48
10. "Subterfuge" – 4:04
11. Interlude (The Flecktones) – 0:39
12. "Misunderstood" – 7:27
13. "The Whistle Tune" – 4:54

== Personnel ==
- Béla Fleck - 1937 Style 75 Gibson Mastertone banjo (tracks 1, 7, 8, 13), 1936 Style 18 Gibson Top Tension gut string banjo (track 3), 2004 Deering Tenbrooks banjo (track 5), 1932 Vega-Vox Deluxe banjo (track 6), Deering Crossfire electric banjo (tracks 2, 9), 1967 Rickenbacker 5-string electric banjo (track 10, 11), Deering 6-String bantar (tracks 11, 12), Paradis stereo guitar (track 4), synth (track 9)
- Jeff Coffin - Soprano saxophone (tracks 2, 5, 7, 8, 11), tenor saxophone (tracks 4, 10, 12), alto saxophone (track 1), flute (tracks 3, 9), clarinet (track 6), D whistle (tracks 4, 13), low-D whistle (track 13), conch shell (track 8), singing bowl (track 9), sleigh bells (tracks 8, 9), synthesizer (tracks 3, 5, 7, 9, 12, 13), synth (track 10), high throat singing (track 9)
- Roy "Future Man" Wooten - Synth-Axe Drumitar, acoustic percussion, Zendrum (track 1), vocals (tracks 4, 12), throat singing (track 9)
- Victor Wooten - Fodera 4 string electric bass (tracks 1–5, 7, 8, 10, 13), Compito 5 string fretless electric bass, (tracks 6, 9, 11, 12), synth pedal (tracks 4, 7)

== Production notes ==
- Béla Fleck with the Flecktones
- Robert Battaglia – engineer, mixing
- Richard Dodd – mastering
- Frank Ockenfels – photography
- Christopher Austopchuk – art direction
- Giulio Turturro – design

== Chart positions ==
Year	Chart	Position
2006	Billboard Top Contemporary Jazz Albums	2
2006	Billboard Top Internet Albums	288
