= Jonathan Scales =

American steel pannist and composer (born 1984)

Jonathan L. Scales
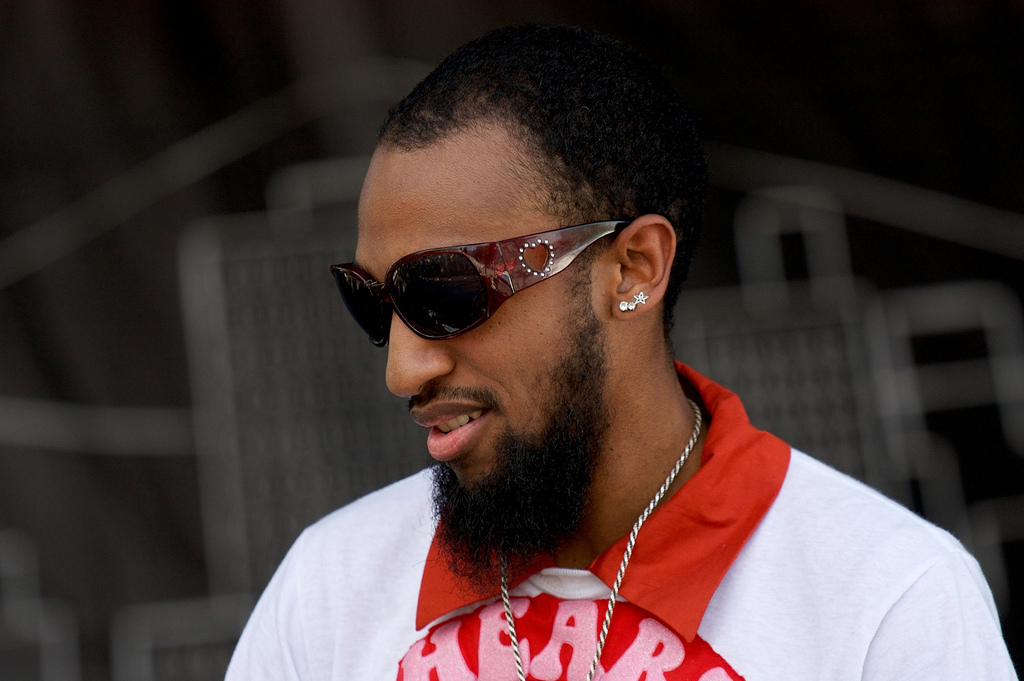
- Scales at Béle Chére on July 23, 2010

Background information
- Born: Jonathan Scales; September 14, 1984 (age 41); San Francisco
- Origin: Asheville, North Carolina, US
- Genres: Jazz; jazz fusion; world music
- Occupations: Musician; composer
- Instrument: Steel drums
- Years active: 2006–present
- Website: www.jonscales.com

Jonathan Scales (born September 14, 1984) is an American steel pannist and composer. He has recorded and produced seven albums, the most recent being Mindstate Music, released in 2019 on Ropeadope Records. Since 2007, Scales has recorded and performed with Victor Wooten, Howard Levy, The Duhks, Roy "Future Man" Wooten, Jeff Coffin, Jeff Sipe, Casey Driessen, Oteil Burbridge, Kofi Burbridge, Yonrico Scott, and Béla Fleck whom Scales describes as his "musical hero". His albums have been reviewed by Modern Drummer and JazzTimes. Scales graduated from Appalachian State University in 2006.

== Early life and career ==
Scales was born in San Francisco and was raised in a military family, spending time in Maryland, Virginia, Fort Bragg, and Germany before settling in North Carolina around the age of fifteen. A saxophonist since high school, Scales took up the steelpan in 2002 and fell in love with the sound of the instrument. Scales enrolled at Appalachian State University in 2002, and after graduating, he formed the jazz fusion quartet Jonathan Scales Fourchestra. The band's collaborative debut, Fourchestra, was released in 2013 on Ropeadope Records. 2014 ushered in Mixtape Symphony, a long-form album inspired by Roy "Future Man" Wooten, also released on Ropeadope Records, featuring compositions by both Scales and bassist Cody Wright.

== Discography ==
- One Track Mind, 2007
- Plot/Scheme, 2008
- Character Farm and Other Short Stories, 2011
- Jonathan Scales Fourchestra, 2013 (Ropeadope)
- Mixtape Symphony, 2014 (Ropeadope)
- PILLAR, 2018 (Ropeadope)
- Mindstate Music, 2019 (Ropeadope)
- RE-POTTED, 2023 (Le'Rue)
