= Paul Hanson (bassoonist) =

American musician

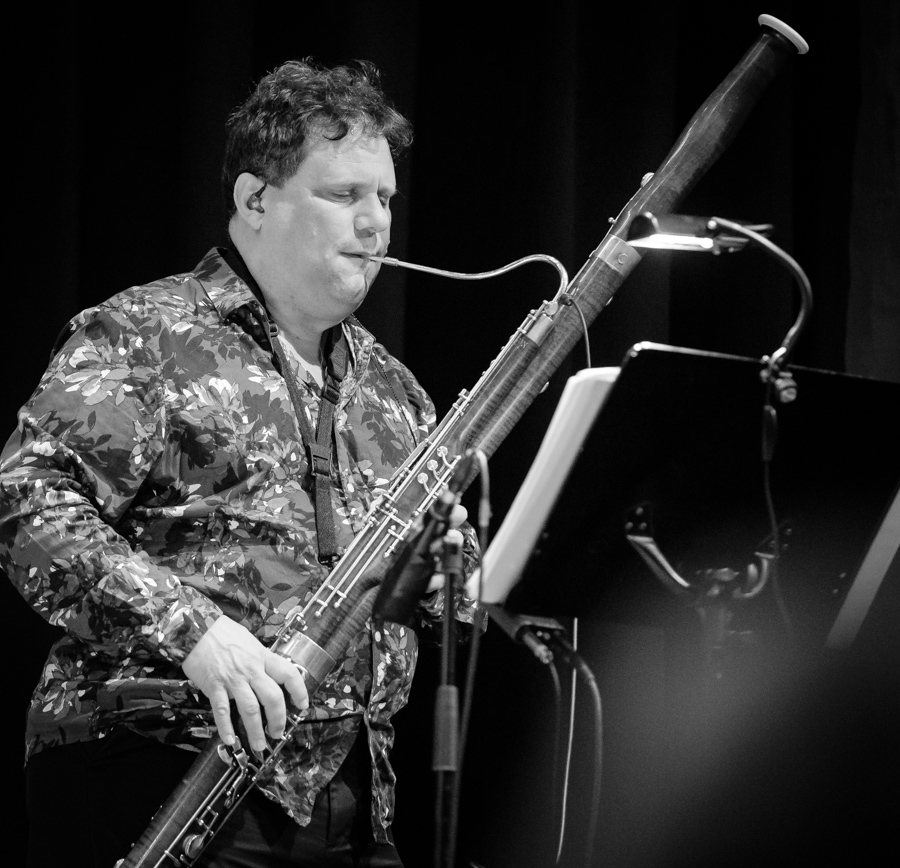
Paul Hanson,2019

Paul Hanson is an American bassoonist, saxophonist, duduk player, and composer with roots in jazz and classical music.

== Music career ==
Paul Hanson was born in San Francisco, CA, on October 28, 1961. His parents were both musicians: his mother a classical pianist and his father a music teacher in the Berkeley Unified School District. In high school, Hanson performed in the Young People's Symphony Orchestra (YPSO) and participated in a concerto competition curated by the San Francisco Symphony. He won the competition in the woodwinds division, receiving the Pepsi Young Musician Award. At the young age of seventeen, Hanson recorded alto saxophone on the album Pillars by Peter Apfelbaum & the Hieroglyphics Ensemble. Since then, his career has expanded vastly into multiple genres. He has performed with Cirque du Soleil, who had created a role specifically for him in the show ZED.

Hanson has received various awards. The National Endowment of the Arts awarded Hanson with a jazz performance grant in 1995. He was the Robert Mondavi Concerto Competition winner as a student in 1984. With Béla Fleck and the Flecktones, he recorded Outbound, which won a Grammy in 2000. Hanson was the Grand Prize winner of JAZZIZ Magazine's Woodwinds on Fire award in 1995. Hanson has taught numerous master classes worldwide, including Ithaca College, Penn State University, Arizona State University, Oklahoma University, University of Wisconsin, Memphis State University, University of Northeastern Oklahoma, University of Arkansas, and Portland State University-all, specializing in modern performance techniques and improvisation for double reed instruments. Hanson has also taught privately in the San Francisco Bay Area.

Hanson has performed and recorded with the likes of:

- Abraham Laboriel
- Béla Fleck and the Flecktones
- Billy Childs
- Billy Cobham
- Billy Higgins
- Brian Blade
- Charlie Hunter
- Contra Costa Chamber Orchestra
- Craig Erikson
- David Binney
- DAVKA
- Dennis Chambers
- Eddie Money
- Jeff Denson
- Jeff Sipe
- Joel Harrison
- Jonas Hellborg
- Kai Eckhardt
- Karen Blixt
- King Baldwin
- Medeski Martin & Wood
- Miguel Zenón
- Napa Symphony Orchestra
- Oakland Eastbay Symphony Orchestra
- Oaktown Irawo
- Omar Sosa
- Patrice Rushen
- Pat Senatore
- Peter Apfelbaum
- Peter Erskine
- Randy Brecker
- Ray Charles
- Raze the Maze
- Rob Wasserman
- SF Jazz
- St. Joseph Ballet Company
- The Klezmorim
- The Paul Dresher Ensemble
- Sawalé
- T Lavitz
- Victor Wooten
- Wayne Shorter

Hanson has performed alongside great musicians and led his solo bassoon show and the Paul Hanson Quintet ‒ both internationally performing ensembles.

== Discography ==
Album	Record label	Year released
The Last Romantics		1994
Astro Boy Blues	Moo	1997
Voodoo Suite	Manzanita Ranch Music	2000
Frolic in the Land of Plenty	Abstract Logix	2008
New Days	Blue Coast Records	2019
Calliope	Manzanita Ranch Music	2024
The Outer Banks	Abstract Logix	2026

=== Appears On ===
Album	Artist	Year released
Pillars	Peter Apfelbaum	1979
Can't Hold Back	Eddie Money	1986
Toni Childs	Union	1988
Kotoja	Sawalé	1994
Pasquale	Billy Childs and Pat Senatore	1995
When Groove Was King	What It is	1996
Funky Cubonics	Omar Sosa and Oaktown Irawo	1998
Range of Motion	Joel Harrison	1999
Outbound	Béla Fleck and the Flecktones	2000
Live at the Quick	Béla Fleck and the Flecktones	2002
The Golem	DAVKA	2004
Timeless	Jeff Sipe	2004
Cosmic Farm	Craig Erikson, T Lavitz, Jeff Sipe, and Rob Wasserman	2005
DAVKA Live	DAVKA	2005
Sipe, Hanson, and Hellborg	Jeff Sipe, Jonas Hellborg, Paul Hanson	2005
Temple of the Invisible	Robert Rich	2005
VU	Zenith Patrol	2005
Mad Hope	Karen Blixt feat. Randy Brecker and Patrice Rushen	2008
Polaris	OoN	2014
Concentric Circles	Jeff Denson Quartet	2015
Spirit House	Joel Harrison	2015
Pictures at an Exhibition	King Baldwin	2018
Producer's Choice	Compilation Album	2018
Kidz These Daze	Casey & The Comrades	2020

== See also ==
- Bassoon § Jazz
