= Live Art =

Live album by Béla Fleck and the Flecktones
- Released: September 10, 1996
- Recorded: Live, 1992–1996
- Genres: Jazz fusion, progressive folk, post-bop, world fusion
- Length: 127:28
- Label: Warner Bros.
- Producer: Béla Fleck

Béla Fleck and the Flecktones chronology
Three Flew Over the Cuckoo's Nest (1993)	Live Art (1996)	Left of Cool (1998)

Live Art is the fifth album released by Béla Fleck and the Flecktones and their first non-studio album. It was recorded live at various concerts between 1992 and 1996 and features ten guest musicians.

Featured guests include Sam Bush, Branford Marsalis, Chick Corea, and Bruce Hornsby.

== Reception ==
Professional ratings
Review scores
Source	Rating
Allmusic	2.5/5 stars
No Depression	(no rating)

In his Allmusic review, music critic Thom Owens wrote "the core of the album is Fleck & the Flecktones' dynamite instrumental improvisations, where they can demonstrate the true range of their eclecticism and talent. Of special note are the songs that feature jams with Branford Marsalis, Chick Corea, and Bruce Hornsby, who help spur the Flecktones to new heights."

Bryson Alden, writing for No Depression, wrote "Their music combines the familiar sounds of bluegrass with whatever else comes along, be it jazz, classical, rap or “The Ballad of Jed Clampett”. In lesser hands, these combinations would almost certainly be disastrous, but thanks to the superlative talent of Bela on banjo and assorted banjoesque electronic devices, along with his sidemen, each with a unique instrument/approach, the result is wonderfully pleasing... This two-CD set, recorded live over a period of five years, provides an excellent benchmark of their work."

== Track listing ==
=== Disc 1 ===
1. "Intro" – 0:38
2. "New South Africa" (Béla Fleck) – 4:43
3. "Stomping Grounds" (Victor Wooten/Fleck) – 5:26
4. "Lochs of Dread" (B. Fleck/Jerry Douglas) – 5:45
5. "Bigfoot" (B. Fleck) – 7:32
6. "Far East Medley" (P.D., arr. The Flecktones) – 7:21
7. "Flying Saucer Dudes" (B. Fleck) – 5:35
8. "UFO Tofu" (B. Fleck) – 3:38
9. "Interlude - Libation, The Water Ritual" (Future Man) – 3:06
10. "Vix 9" (V. Wooten) – 6:02
11. "The Message" (Joe Wooten/The Flecktones) – 9:16

=== Disc 2 ===
1. "Improv/Amazing Grace" (P.D., arr. V. Wooten) – 6:46
2. "Shubbee's Doobie" (B. Fleck/Sam Bush) – 4:40
3. "Oh! Darling" (Lennon–McCartney) – 6:21
4. "Blu-bop" (Howard Levy/The Flecktones) – 7:36
5. "Sunset Road" (B. Fleck) – 5:56
6. "More Luv" (V. Wooten) – 7:43
7. "Early Reflection/Bach/The Ballad of Jed Clampett" – 6:09
  - "Early Reflection" (B. Fleck)
  - "Presto" from Sonata #1 in G minor for unaccompanied violin (Johann Sebastian Bach)
  - "The Ballad of Jed Clampett" (Paul Henning)
8. "Cheeseballs in Cowtown" (B. Fleck) – 5:38
9. "Sinister Minister" (B. Fleck) – 7:30
10. "Flight of the Cosmic Hippo" (B. Fleck) – 4:52

== Personnel ==
=== The Flecktones ===
- Béla Fleck - banjo (tracks 3, 5, 7, 8, 11, 2.5, 2.7, 2.8, 2.10), electric banjo (tracks 1, 2, 4, 6, 10, 2.3, 2.4, 2.6, 2.9), synth (tracks 2.3, 2.4, 2.9), 6-string banjo (track 2.2)
- Future Man - Synth-Axe Drumitar (tracks 2–11, 2.3–2.6, 2.8, 2.9), zendrum (track 11), acoustic percussion (on banjos and Philippine trash can) (track 2.2), acoustic percussion (track 2.10), vocals (track 2.6)
- Victor Wooten - bass (tracks 1–3, 5–8, 10, 2.1, 2.3, 2.4, 2.9), fretless bass (tracks 4, 2.5, 2.8), tenor bass (tracks 11, 2.6), cello (tracks 2.2, 2.10), vocals (track 11)

=== Guest musicians ===
- Sam Bush - mandolin (tracks 2–4, 6, 11, 2.5, 2.6), mandola (tracks 2.2, 2.8), violin (tracks 5, 2.9), backing vocals (track 2.6)
- Paul McCandless - soprano saxophone (tracks 2, 3, 2.5, 2.6, 2.9), bass clarinet (tracks 4–6, 2.10), pennywhistle (track 4), English horn (tracks 2.2, 2.5), sopranino saxophone (track 2.6)
- Branford Marsalis - soprano saxophone (tracks 5, 7)
- Howard Levy - keyboards (track 7, 8, 14, 15), harmonica (track 7, 2.4, 2.9)
- Chick Corea - piano (tracks 11, 2.8), zendrum (track 11)
- Edgar Meyer - Acoustic bass (bowed) (track 11)
- Stuart Duncan - violin (tracks 11, 2.8)
- Jerry Douglas - dobro (tracks 11, 2.8)
- John Cowan - vocals on "Oh! Darling"
- Bruce Hornsby - piano (track 2.6), vocals (track 2.6)

== Chart positions ==
Year	Chart	Position
1996	Billboard Heatseekers	4
1996	Billboard Top Contemporary Jazz Albums	9
