= Jingle All the Way (Béla Fleck and the Flecktones album) =

Album by Béla Fleck and the Flecktones

Studio album by Béla Fleck and the Flecktones
- Released: September 30, 2008 (CD); November 4, 2008 (Vinyl); November 17, 2008 (UK)
- Genre: Jazz fusion, progressive bluegrass, pop, holiday music
- Length: 61:01
- Label: Rounder Records
- Producer: Béla Fleck with the Flecktones

Béla Fleck and the Flecktones chronology
The Hidden Land (2006)	Jingle All the Way (2008)	Rocket Science (2011)

Jingle All the Way is a Christmas album and the thirteenth album overall by Béla Fleck and the Flecktones. Released in 2008 under Rounder, it marks the band's first record since their departure from Columbia. Jingle All the Way reached #1 on the Top Contemporary Jazz chart, the group's first album to do so since 1991. It also won the 2009 Grammy Award for Best Pop Instrumental Album.

The band's rendition of "Sleigh Ride" was nominated for Best Country Instrumental Performance. It was performed on the December 22, 2008 edition of Late Night with Conan O'Brien. This is also the last studio album to feature saxophonist Jeff Coffin before his departure in 2009 to join the Dave Matthews Band.

== Overview ==
In an interview with Billboard, Béla Fleck described the band's desire to record Christmas songs:

"We've always wanted to do an album like this. . . This year we started to do less touring, and we didn't want to tour without some new music. It was a slow, steady project. A lot of the arrangements were worked out on tour."

One of the album's most ambitious tracks, "The Twelve Days of Christmas," builds up to 12 different keys and 12 different time signatures over the course of the tune. Jingle All the Way also features a medley which fuses several Christmas classics and as Fleck described, "five or six are being played together, simultaneously." Indeed, the song includes "We Wish You a Merry Christmas," "Rudolph the Red Nosed Reindeer," and "My Favorite Things" and has been performed at Flecktones concerts for years prior to its 2008 studio recording. Guests on the album include Andy Statman, Edgar Meyer, and the Alash Ensemble, who specialize in Tuvan throat singing.

Fleck also described to The Washington Post, who named the band Editors' Pick in December 2008, how the Flecktones wanted to avoid holiday music clichés:

"I didn't want to go the route of getting super-famous guests because that could lead to cheese. That suggestion came up: 'Why don't you make a Christmas record with Tony Bennett, Willie Nelson, and Sting with you guys as the backing band?' We're not a backing band. We'd rather go down in obscurity than to be famous for something we're not."

He went on to describe how, while much of the Flecktones' music is complex and not easily digestible to some music fans, "Christmas music is inside everyone's DNA" and that it creates a doorway for them to understand the Flecktones' unique music.

A U.S. tour intended to highlight much of the Jingle All The Way material began November 15, 2008 in Spokane, Washington and concluded with a four-night run at the Blue Note in New York City.

== Reception ==
Professional ratings
Review scores
Source	Rating
AllMusic	3/5 stars
PopMatters	7/10 stars
Washington Post	(favorable)

Critically, Jingle All the Way is widely praised as a unique and engaging jazz-infused twist on classic holiday songs. Juli Thanki of PopMatters praised Jingle All the Way for its reinvention of "tired songs." She commented, "Fleck and his bandmates keep the improvisational noodling to a minimum, making this an enjoyable album for jazz fans and nonfans alike while still maintaining the integrity of these holiday classics."

Despite his criticism of the album's uncreative title and photography, AllMusic's James Christopher Monger considered Jingle All the Way "anything but predictable." He added that the "notoriously monotonous" holiday music is "filtered through the skewed prism of an outfit capable of just about anything from klezmer, to classical to Tuvan throat singing."

The Flecktones were named The Washington Post Editors' Pick in December 2008. Post writer Geoffrey Himes described the innovative tweaks the Flecktones put on classic tunes and added, "They slow down for 'Silent Night' and prove they are just as capable of coaxing the feeling out of a simple melody as they are at quadrupling the number of notes per measure."

== Track listing ==
1. "Jingle Bells" – 3:30
2. "Silent Night" – 4:41
3. "Sleigh Ride" (Leroy Anderson, Mitchell Parish) – 3:29
4. "The Christmas Song" (Mel Tormé, Bob Wells) – 3:01
5. "The Twelve Days of Christmas" – 5:19
6. "J.S. Bach's Christmas Oratorio: Ich Will Nur Zu Ehren Leben" – 4:26
7. "Christmas Time Is Here" (Vince Guaraldi, Lee Mendelson) – 2:21
8. "Linus and Lucy" (Vince Guaraldi) – 2:54
9. "Jingle Bells (Reprise)" – 3:13
10. "The Hanukkah Waltz" – 2:34
11. "Danse of the Sugar Plum Fairies" (Pyotr Ilyich Tchaikovsky) – 3:29
12. "What Child is This/Dyngyldai" – 5:08
13. "O Come All Ye Faithful" – 2:12
14. "Medley: We Wish You a Merry Christmas/It's Beginning to Look a Lot Like Christmas" (Meredith Willson) – 5:38
15. "Have Yourself a Merry Little Christmas" (Ralph Blane, Hugh Martin) – 5:48
16. "River" (Joni Mitchell) – 3:46

== Personnel ==
Béla Fleck and the Flecktones

- Jeff Coffin – soprano saxophone (tracks 2, 3, 5, 6), tenor saxophone (tracks 10, 12), baritone saxophone (track 15), flute (tracks 1, 14), bass clarinet (track 11)
- Béla Fleck – banjo (tracks 1–3, 5–12, 15, 16), electric banjo (track 14), piano (track 16)
- Roy "Future Man" Wooten – Synth-Axe Drumitar (1–3, 5–8, 10–12, 14, 15), acoustic percussion (tracks 1–3, 5–8, 10–12, 14, 15)
- Victor Wooten – electric bass guitars (tracks 1–8, 11, 12, 15), fretless bass (tracks 10, 14)

Additional musicians

- Alash Ensemble – Tuvan throat singing, igil, doshpuluur, byzaanchy, kengirge and shyngyrash
- Edgar Meyer – double bass (tracks 5, 6, 13, 14)
- Andy Statman – clarinet (tracks 5, 10), mandolin (tracks 5, 13–15)
- Sean Quirk – Tuvan throat singing (track 5)
- Ayan-Ool Sam – Tuvan throat singing (track 9)

== Chart positions ==
Year	Chart	Position
2008	Billboard Top Contemporary Jazz Albums	1
