= Kongar-ool Ondar =

Tuvan throat singer (1962–2013)

Kongar-ool Ondar Ондар Коңгар-оол
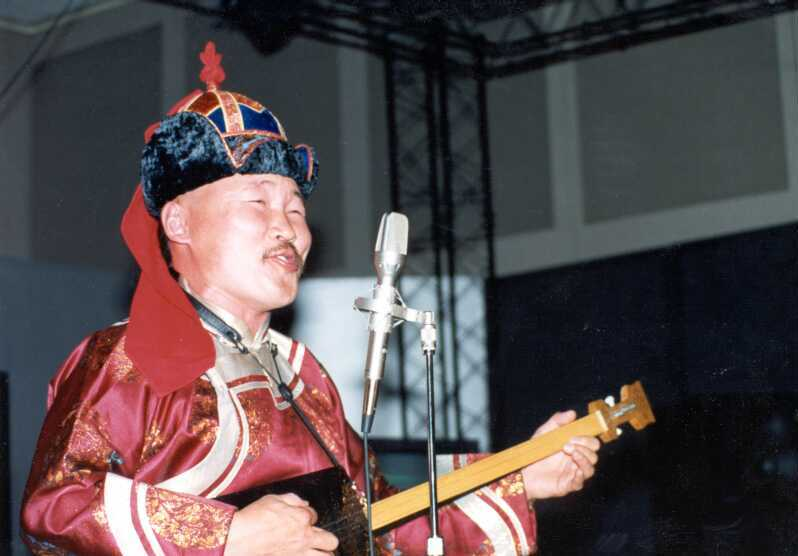
- Ondar in 1993

Background information
- Born: 29 March 1962; Near the Khemchik River, Tuvan ASSR, Soviet Union (now Tuva, Russia)
- Died: 25 July 2013 (aged 51); Kyzyl, Tuva, Russia
- Genres: Tuvan throat singing
- Instruments: Doshpuluur, Igil, Chanzy
- Years active: 1980 - 2013
- Labels: Warner Bros. Records
- Website: ondar.com

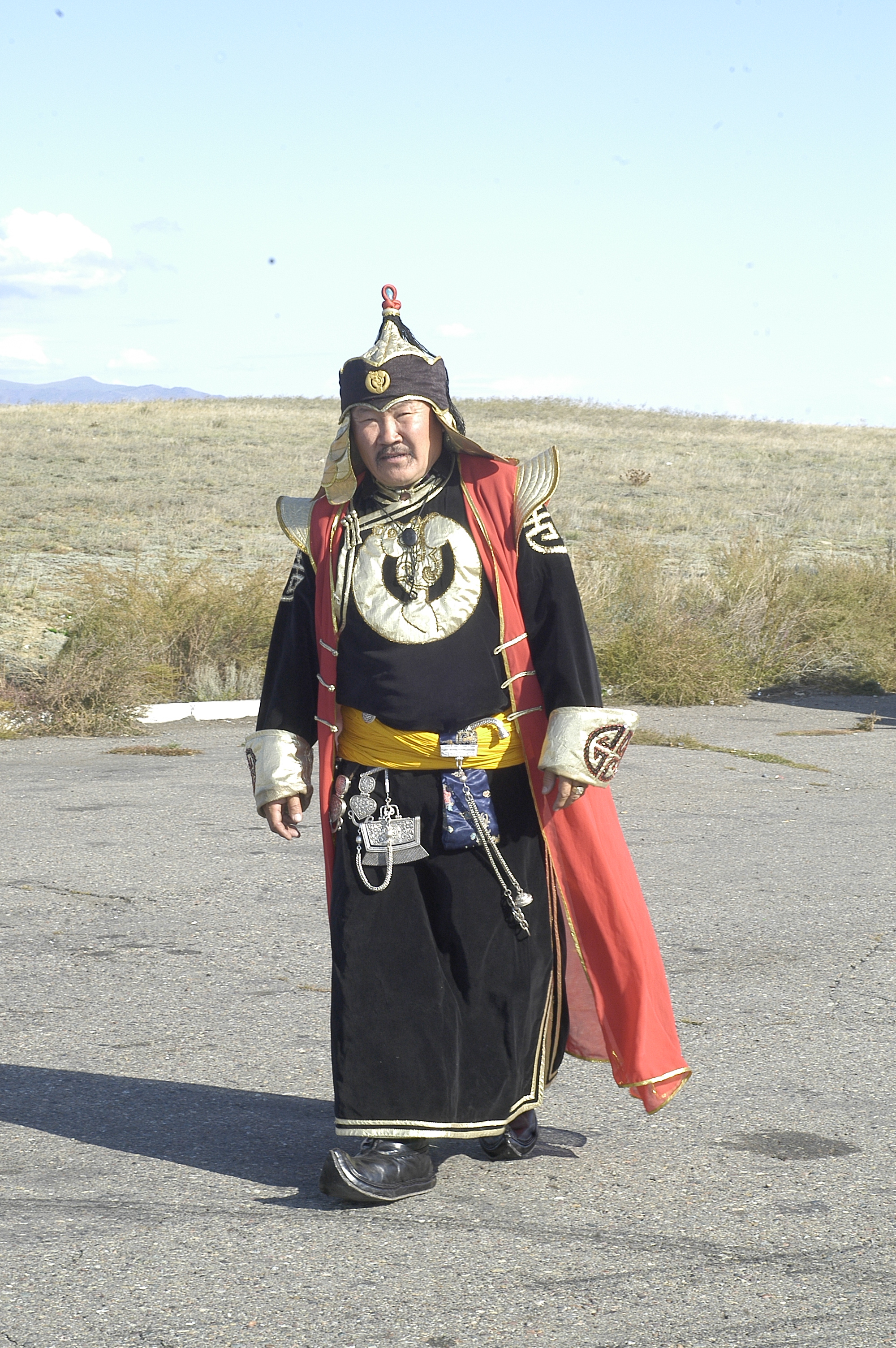
Kongar-ool Borisovich Ondar

Kongar-ool Borisovich Ondar (Tuvan: Ондар Коңгар-оол Борис оглу, Ondar Konggar-ool Boris oglu, [ɔnˈdɑr kɔŋˈɡɑrɔːɮ bɐˈris ɔˈɡlu], Russian: Конгар-оол Борисович Ондар; 29 March 1962 – 25 July 2013) was a master Soviet and Russian Tuvan throat singer and a member of the Great Khural of Tuva.

Ondar was born near the Khemchik River in western Tuva, in the village of Iyme. In the Central Asian tradition of self-fulfilling child naming, Kongar-ool literally translates to "loud boy." In 1983 Ondar was drafted into the army, but was discharged due to a neck injury. After this, in the 1980s, he was twice thrown into prison (the first time for fighting and the second for a stabbing), serving several years in Siberia. By 1990 he was touring Europe as a member of the Tuvan State Ensemble "Sayani." In 1992, he won an international throat-singing contest, which brought invitations to perform in Europe and the United States and began his singing career.

Considered a living treasure by the Republic of Tuva, Ondar was granted a stipend and an apartment for the musical skills he possessed. Jovial and personable, Ondar is probably the best-known face of khöömei (Tuvan: хөөмей) throat singing to Westerners, appearing on the Late Show with David Letterman, the Oscar-nominated documentary Genghis Blues, and in interviews for CNN and other television networks. Ondar was also a teacher and opened a Center for the Development of Tuvan Traditional Arts in Kyzyl.

Ondar is also known outside Tuva for inviting American blues musician Paul Pena to Tuva. Pena, who had learned throat singing before coming to Tuva, was the subject of the documentary Genghis Blues in which Ondar was also featured. In 1993, he performed at Frank Zappa's eclectic "garden party/soiree" gathering in his last days.

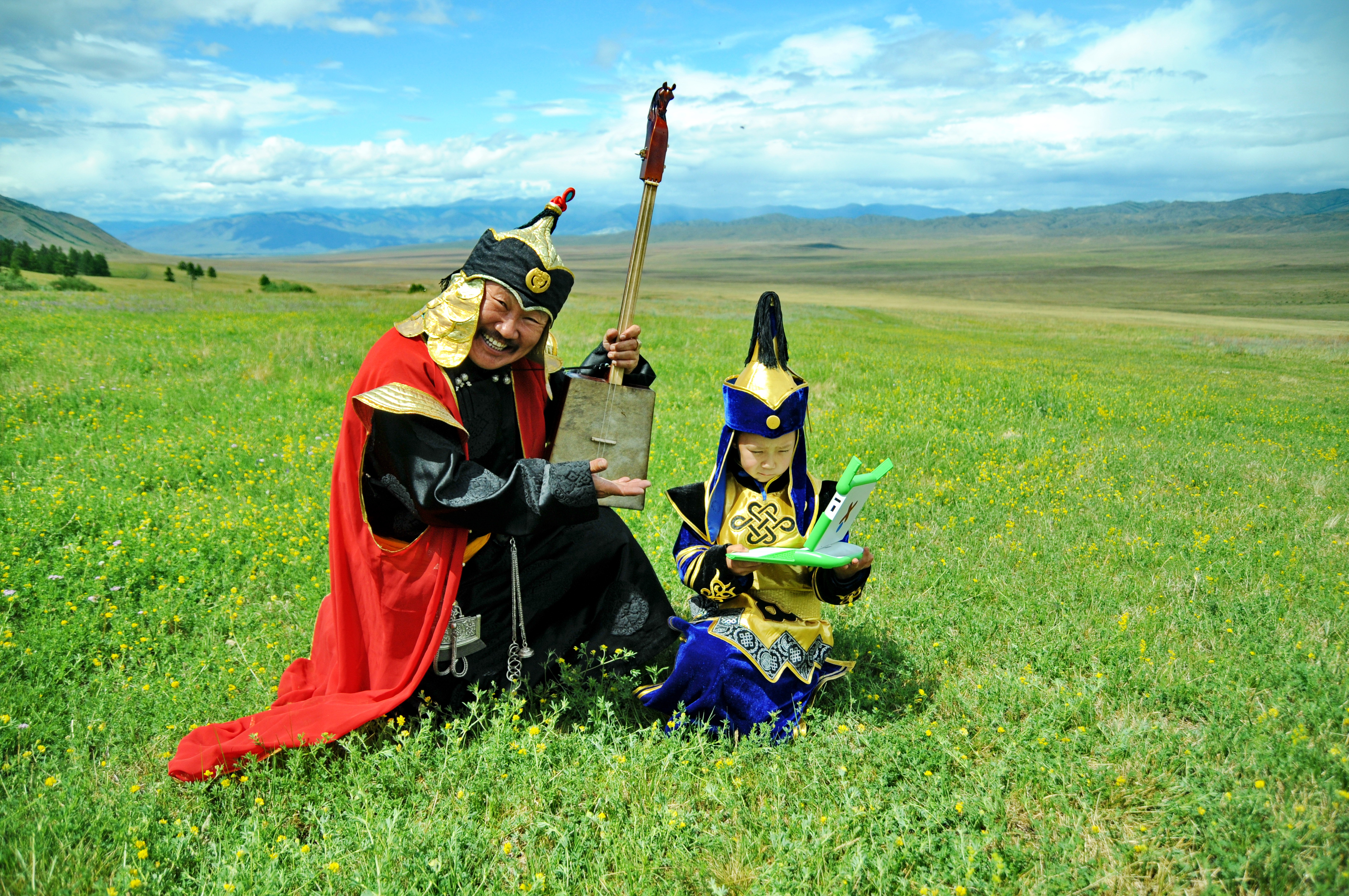
Kongar-ool Borisovich Ondar in his homeland of Tuva

He also appears on the Béla Fleck and the Flecktones albums Outbound, album/DVD Live at the Quick, and Jingle All the Way. He released one album on Warner Bros. Records, Back Tuva Future.

His first studio album, 1996's Echoes of Tuva, was released by the TuvaMuch Music label. He released another album sampling physicist Richard Feynman titled Tuva Talk.

He died after emergency surgery for a brain hemorrhage in Kyzyl on 25 July 2013. He was 51 years old.
