= Béla Fleck and the Flecktones (album) =

Studio album by Béla Fleck and the Flecktones
- Released: March 6, 1990
- Recorded: 1989
- Studio: Javelina (Nashville, Tennessee)
- Genre: Jazz fusion, bluegrass, post-bop
- Length: 47:56
- Label: Warner Bros.
- Producer: Béla Fleck with the Flecktones

Béla Fleck and the Flecktones chronology
Béla Fleck and the Flecktones (1990)	Flight of the Cosmic Hippo (1991)

Béla Fleck and the Flecktones is the debut album by Béla Fleck and the Flecktones, released in 1990. It reached number 17 on the Billboard Top Contemporary Jazz Albums chart. At the Grammy Awards of 1997, a live version of "The Sinister Minister", a track from the album, won the Best Pop Instrumental Performance award.

== Reception ==
Professional ratings
Review scores
Source	Rating
Allmusic	4.5/5 stars

In his Allmusic review, music critic Brian Mansfield praised the album and wrote "For all the flash, there's little pretense; the group's astonishing musicianship keeps an 'aw-shucks' accessibility that lets everybody follow the melody while they marvel."

== Track listing ==
All songs by Béla Fleck unless otherwise noted.

1. "Sea Brazil" – 3:43
2. "Frontiers" – 6:08
3. "Hurricane Camille" – 2:38
4. "Half Moon Bay" – 5:09
5. "The Sinister Minister" – 4:38
6. "Sunset Road" – 5:04
7. "Flipper" – 4:21
8. "Mars Needs Women: Space is a Lonely Place" – 5:01
9. "Mars Needs Women: They're Here" – 3:30
10. "Reflections of Lucy" (B. Fleck/John Lennon/Paul McCartney) – 3:38
11. "Tell It to the Gov'nor" – 4:06

=== Single ===
The only single from the album was "The Sinister Minister". The music video received heavy airplay on MTV and VH1 at the time of its release. Because of the popularity of the video, it was featured on an episode of VH1's Pop-Up Video. The song won won a Grammy Award for Best Pop Instrumental Performance in 1997, despite having been released seven years earlier.

== Personnel ==
- Béla Fleck – banjo
- Howard Levy – diatonic harmonica (tracks 1, 2, 4, 5, 8–11), synth (tracks 5, 11), synthesizers (tracks 5, 6, 8, 10), piano (tracks 1–4, 6, 7, 10), Jew's harp (track 2), güiro (track 5)
- Roy "Future Man" Wooten – Synth-Axe Drumitar
- Victor Wooten – bass
- Camille Harrison (uncredited) – vocals (track 6)

== Production notes ==
- Produced by Béla Fleck with the Flecktones
- Carlos Grier – editing
- Bil VornDick – mixing
- Denny Purcell – mastering
- Mark Fox – artwork, design
- Laura LiPuma – art direction
- Jim McGuire – photography

== Chart positions ==
Year	Chart	Position
1990	Billboard Top Contemporary Jazz Albums	17
