= Flight of the Cosmic Hippo =

Studio album by Béla Fleck and the Flecktones
- Released: June 11, 1991
- Recorded: 1991
- Studio: The Castle (Franklin, Tennessee)
- Genres: Jazz fusion, post-bop, folk rock, bluegrass
- Length: 43:57
- Label: Warner Bros.
- Producer: Béla Fleck with the Flecktones

Béla Fleck and the Flecktones chronology
Béla Fleck and the Flecktones (1990)	Flight of the Cosmic Hippo (1991)	UFO Tofu (1992)

Flight of the Cosmic Hippo is the second album by Béla Fleck and the Flecktones, released in 1991. It reached number 1 on the Billboard Top Contemporary Jazz Albums chart. The album title came from an audience member who suggested "Flight of the Codeine Hippo"; the band changed "codeine" to "cosmic".

The album received two Grammy nominations.

== Production ==
The group's version of "The Star-Spangled Banner" was recorded the night the Gulf War began.

== Critical reception ==
Professional ratings
Review scores
Source	Rating
AllMusic	4.5/5 stars
Chicago Tribune	3/4 stars
The Encyclopedia of Popular Music	4/5 stars
Entertainment Weekly	B
MusicHound Folk: The Essential Album Guide	4/5 stars
The Rolling Stone Album Guide	4/5 stars

AllMusic's Brian Mansfield wrote: "The Flecktones owe more to bebop than bluegrass, and here the group finally names their style 'blu-bop.' That's why Flight of the Cosmic Hippo topped the jazz, not the country, chart. The Flecktones continue to make it look easy, adding banjo power chords to 'Turtle Rock' and reworking Lennon/McCartney's 'Michelle'." The Chicago Tribune wrote that "this is a group with a warm, engaging sense of humor and a desire to communicate, not a bunch of Berklee whiz kids practicing lessons in advanced harmonics." The Los Angeles Times wrote that "over the course of the Hippo album, the Flecktones ... essay a traditional Irish folk song, 'Star of the County Down'; a spirited rock 'n' roll number, 'Turtle Rock'; a jazzy take on the Beatles' 'Michelle', and a surprisingly soulful reading of '"The Star-Spangled Banner"'." The Indianapolis Star deemed the album "jazz, played with country instruments and down-home warmth—what Chick Corea might sound like if he played with the Nitty Gritty Dirt Band."

== Track listing ==
All songs by Béla Fleck unless otherwise noted.

1. "Blu-Bop" (The Flecktones) – 4:22
2. "Flying Saucer Dudes" – 4:51
3. "Turtle Rock" – 4:12
4. "Flight of the Cosmic Hippo" – 4:29
5. "The Star-Spangled Banner" (Francis Scott Key, arr. the Flecktones) – 2:35
6. "Star of the County Down" (P.D., arr. the Flecktones) – 4:21
7. "Jekyll and Hyde (and Ted and Alice)" – 7:04
8. "Michelle" (John Lennon/Paul McCartney) – 5:10
9. "Hole in the Wall" – 4:40
10. "Flight of the Cosmic Hippo (Reprise)" – 2:14

== Personnel ==
- Béla Fleck – banjo (tracks 2, 4–10), electric banjo (tracks 1, 3), synth (track 1)
- Howard Levy – diatonic harmonica (tracks 2, 3, 5–8, 10), piano (tracks 2–5, 7–10), synthesizers (tracks 1, 2, 4–6, 9), harmonica in a cup (track 4), harmonica through micro synth (track 2), double ocarina (track 9), Hammond B-3 organ (track 6)
- "Future Man" – Synth-Axe Drumitar
- Victor Wooten – 4-string, 5-string fretless (tracks 4, 5, 7, 10) and 6-string (track 8) electric basses

Production

- Produced and mixed by Béla Fleck with the Flecktones
- Bil VornDick – engineer, mixing
- Carlos Grier – editing
- Denny Purcell – mastering
- Mark Nevers – assistant engineer
- Keith Odle – mixing assistant
- Richard Battaglia – assistant engineer, mixing assistant
- Mark Tucker – photography
- Elvis Wilson – design
- Laura LiPuma – art direction
- Mark Fox – artwork

== Chart positions ==
Year	Chart	Position
1991	Billboard Top Contemporary Jazz Albums	1
