= Balkan Samba Records =

American record label

- Founded: 2004
- Founder: Howard Levy
- Genre: Latin jazz, classical, world
- Country of origin: U.S.
- Location: Evanston, Illinois
- Official website: www.balkansamba.com

Balkan Samba Records is a record label in Evanston, Illinois founded by multi-instrumentalist and composer Howard Levy.

The label was founded by Levy in 2004 as a way for him to record and publish previously unpublished works of his own music and that of his associates and friends, such as Chicago Symphony violinist Fox Fehling; the Latin jazz group Chévere de Chicago, Howard Levy's Acoustic Express; guitarist Norman Savitt, and an instructional DVD Harmonica Out of the Box, Vol. 1.

== See also ==
- List of record labels
