= Alberto Mizrahi =

American cantor and tenor

- Born: Greece
- Genres: Jewish liturgical music, classical, jazz
- Occupations: Cantor; tenor

Alberto Mizrahi is an American cantor and tenor known as an interpreter of Jewish liturgical music and for performances that bridge cantorial, classical, and jazz traditions. He served for decades as cantor of Anshe Emet Synagogue in Chicago, where he is Hazzan Emeritus, and is a former president of the Cantors Assembly.

== Early life and education ==
Mizrahi was born in Greece and immigrated to the United States as a child with his family, including his father, a Holocaust survivor. He initially aspired to a career in opera before turning to cantorial music.

He studied at the Cantors Institute of the Jewish Theological Seminary of America, where he trained with cantor David Kusevitsky and later became a protégé of Moshe Ganchoff.

== Career ==
=== Cantorial and concert career ===
Mizrahi served as cantor of Anshe Emet Synagogue in Chicago beginning in 1990. He has performed widely in the United States, Europe, and Israel in synagogue, concert, and orchestral settings. He has performed with major orchestras including the Chicago Symphony Orchestra and the New York Philharmonic.

Mizrahi has also appeared in cantorial concerts alongside leading cantors on the international stage. In 2007, he performed at a Hanukkah reception at the White House hosted by President George W. Bush.

=== Classical and operatic work ===
Mizrahi has appeared as a tenor soloist in major concert works and festivals, including performances noted in The New York Times. He has performed works by composers including Arnold Schoenberg and Krzysztof Penderecki and has collaborated with conductor Riccardo Muti.

He also worked in operatic settings and understudied Luciano Pavarotti in Un ballo in maschera.

=== Jazz and cross-genre work ===
Mizrahi is known for exploring connections between Jewish liturgical music and jazz. He has performed extensively in composer and pianist Dave Brubeck’s cantata The Gates of Justice, in which he sings the role of the prophet Isaiah.

He has also collaborated with jazz musicians including Howard Levy and Trio Globo, performing programs that reinterpret Jewish liturgical and folk material using jazz techniques.

Mizrahi has described improvisation as a central link between cantorial and jazz traditions and noted shared features such as modal scales, rhythmic freedom, and expressive vocal techniques.

== Recordings and media ==
Mizrahi has recorded extensively, with a discography of more than 25 albums. His recordings include collaborations with Theodore Bikel and projects such as Matzah to Menorah, blending Jewish liturgical music with jazz influences.

He appears as narrator on a recording of Arnold Schoenberg’s Kol Nidre with the Chicago Symphony Orchestra conducted by Riccardo Muti, which was included in The New York Times list of the best classical recordings of 2016. The recording received a Grammy Award in 2017. Mizrahi is also featured in the documentary 100 Voices: A Journey Home.

== Musical style and reception ==
Mizrahi’s singing has been noted for its expressive intensity and ornamentation. In a review in The New York Times, critic Bernard Holland described his performance of cantorial and Ladino repertoire as “eloquently sung,” highlighting the “heavy ornament and extravagant emotiveness” of his vocal style. He was described in the Chicago Tribune as a “widely admired and remarkably versatile cantor” for his work across liturgical, classical, and jazz contexts.

Critical reception has varied across genres. In another New York Times review, Sarah Bryan Miller wrote that while Mizrahi could be “dreadfully annoying” as an operatic tenor, he was “much more at home as a cantor,” where he demonstrated a “virtuosic command” of Jewish liturgical styles.

== Professional leadership ==
Mizrahi served as president of the Cantors Assembly, an international organization representing cantors. He has also held roles with the Jewish Theological Seminary and other Jewish musical and educational organizations.
