= Jeff Coffin =

American saxophonist, composer, and educator

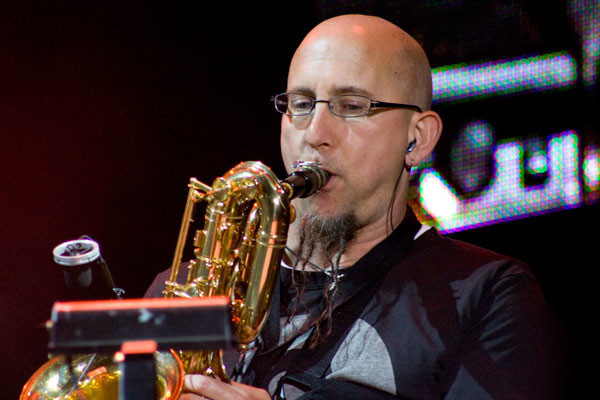
- Coffin performing in 2008

Background information
- Born: August 5, 1965 (age 61); Massachusetts, U.S.
- Genres: Jazz; pop; rock
- Occupations: Musician; record label owner
- Instruments: Saxophone; clarinet; flute; synthesizers
- Years active: 1991–present
- Labels: Ear Up; Compass
- Website: jeffcoffin.com

Jeff Stanley Coffin (born August 5, 1965) is an American saxophonist, composer, and educator. He is a three-time Grammy Award winner as a member of Bela Fleck and the Flecktones, with whom he performed from 1997 until 2010. In July 2008, Coffin began touring with Dave Matthews Band and joined the group in 2009 following the death of founding member LeRoi Moore. He also leads his group Jeff Coffin & the Mu'tet.

== Early years ==
Born in Massachusetts and raised in Dexter, Maine, Coffin began playing alto sax in fifth grade under the tutelage of Arthur Lagassee, the band director for the district. For two summers during the 1980s he attended the Summer Youth Music School at the University of New Hampshire which he credits for his love for mentoring young musicians. In 1983, after graduating from Spaulding High School in Rochester, New Hampshire, he attended the University of New Hampshire for two years. He studied at the University of North Texas and graduated with a degree in Music Education in 1990. A recipient of a Jazz Studies grant from the NEA, in 1991, he studied under saxophonist Joe Lovano.

In 1997, he became a member of Béla Fleck and the Flecktones. Due to extensive touring requirements, he left the Flecktones in 2008. During the same year, he joined the Dave Matthews Band for their summer tour after saxophonist LeRoi Moore was injured in an all-terrain vehicle accident. He had intended to be in the band temporarily, but became a permanent replacement when Moore died from his injuries. He continued Moore's work on the band's album Big Whiskey & the GrooGrux King.

Since the late 1990s Coffin has been recording and touring with his band, The Mu'tet. He has released some of the band's albums on his label, Ear Up Records. Taking the name from the word 'mutation', the Mu'tet reflects Coffin's philosophy that music must change and mutate in order to evolve. Coffin has also worked with Jeff Babko, Will Lee, Keith Carlock, Nir Felder, Dave Liebman, Randy Brecker, Grace Kelly, Nate Smith, Cory Wong, Roy "Futureman" Wooten, Victor Wooten, Chester Thompson, Keb' Mo', R.A.P Ferreira, Tony Hall, MonoNeon, Michael League, Robben Ford, Bill Evans, Daru Jones, Kris Myers, Marcus King, Derek Brown, Jeff Sipe, Charlie Peacock, Vinnie Colaiuta, Everyone Orchestra, R. Prasanna, Jonathan Scales, and JD Souther.

Coffin has given over 300 music clinics at colleges, universities, and other schools both nationally and internationally. He is on the faculty of the Blair School of Music at Vanderbilt University.

== Awards and honors ==
- Best Contemporary Jazz Album, Outbound (2001)
- Best Contemporary Jazz Album, The Hidden Land (2007)
- Best Pop Instrumental Album, Jingle All the Way (2009)
- Best Contemporary Instrumental Album, Between Dreaming and Joy (2023) [NOMINATED]

== Discography ==
=== As leader or co-leader ===
- Outside the Lines (Artifex, 1997)
- Commonality (Compass, 1999)
- Go-Round (Compass, 2001)
- Bloom (Compass, 2005)
- Arc of the Circle (2006) with Charlie Peacock
- Mutopia (Compass, 2008)
- Duet (Compass, 2011) with Jeff Sipe
- Live! (Ear Up, 2011)
- Side Up (Ear Up, 2014)
- Inside of the Outside (2015)
- Sometimes Springtime (2016)
- Next Time Yellow (2017)
- Shout It Out! Spirit Music... (2018)
- Flight (2018) with Tatsuya Nakatani
- The Moment of Now (2018) with Roy "Futureman" Wooten
- Santa Digs Me (2018) with Chris Walters [Single]
- Tall & Lanky (2020) [Single]
- Emergence (2020) with Pat Coil [Single]
- Songs of Solitude (2020)
- Symbiosis (2021) with Derek Brown
- Let It Shine (2021) with Helen Gillet
- Between Dreaming and Joy (2022)
- Look For Water (2023)
- Only the Horizon (2024)
- Nu Jazz (2025) with The Nu Gurus

With Béla Fleck and the Flecktones

- Left of Cool (1998)
- Greatest Hits of the 20th Century (1999)
- Outbound (2000)
- Live at the Quick (2002)
- Little Worlds (2003)
- The Hidden Land (2006)
- Jingle All the Way (2008)

With Dave Matthews Band

- The Best of What's Around Vol. 1 (Encore CD) (2006)
- Live at Mile High Music Festival (2008)
- Live Trax 2008 (2008)
- Big Whiskey and the GrooGrux King (2009)
- Live Trax Vol. 15 (2009)
- Europe 2009 (2009)
- Live Trax Vol. 19 (2010)
- Live in New York City (2010)
- Live at Wrigley Field (2011)
- Away from the World (2012)
- Come Tomorrow (2018)
- Walk Around the Moon (2023)

With Band Of Other Brothers

- City of Cranes (2016)
- Look Up! (2021)
- This Year At Christmas (2024)

With Portara Ensemble & Ciona Rouse

- The Longest Night (2019)

With Dream Shanti

- Dream Shanti (2019)

With In Orbit

- In Orbit (2018)

With Jordan Perlson & Matt Wigton

- Sleigh What?! (2017)

With Jeff Babko & Vinnie Colaiuta

- Mondo Trio (2007)

=== As guest ===
With Jon Foreman

- Fall (2007)
- Winter (2008)
- The Wonderlands: Darkness (2015)
- The Wonderlands: Dawn (2015)

With Umphrey's McGee

- Mantis (2009)
- Death by Stereo (2011)

With Jonathan Scales

- Plot/Scheme, Jonathan Scales (2008)
- Character Farm and Other Short Stories, Jonathan Scales (2011)
- Pillar, Jonathan Scales Fourchestra (2018)

With others

- Be the Change, R. Prasanna (2004)
- Chunked, The Triodes (2009)
- Harlem River Blues, Justin Townes Earle (2010)
- Natural History, JD Souther (2011)
- Mountains of Sorrow, Rivers of Song, Amos Lee (2013)
- Melophobia, Cage the Elephant (2013)
- Far Away From Everyday, Brad Hoyt (2013)
- Tenderness, JD Souther (2015)
- Kind of New, Ingrid Jensen, Jason Miles (2015)
- Family Dinner – Volume 2, Snarky Puppy (2016)
- Sky Trails, David Crosby (2017)
- On the Corner Live! The Music of Miles Davis, David Liebman & Friends (2019)
- INTERBLAZE, Ally Fiola & The Next Quest (2023)
