= UFO Tofu =

Studio album by Béla Fleck and the Flecktones
- Released: 1992
- Recorded: 1992
- Studio: Javelina (Nashville, Tennessee); Sound Stage (Nashville, Tennessee)
- Genre: Jazz fusion
- Length: 55:01
- Label: Warner Bros.
- Producer: Béla Fleck, Roy Wooten, Howard Levy, Victor Wooten

Béla Fleck and the Flecktones chronology
Flight of the Cosmic Hippo (1991)	UFO Tofu (1992)	Three Flew Over the Cuckoo's Nest (1993)

UFO Tofu is the third album by Béla Fleck and the Flecktones, released in 1992. The title is a palindrome, which is also a musical theme in the title track; the idea originated with the musician Baby Gramps.

== Production ==
The album was produced by Fleck, Roy Wooten, Howard Levy, and Victor Wooten. "Bonnie & Slyde" is a tribute to Bonnie Raitt and her slide guitar mastery. "Sex in a Pan" was inspired by a dessert offered at a restaurant in North Carolina.

== Critical reception ==
Professional ratings
Review scores
Source	Rating
AllMusic	3/5 stars
The Indianapolis Star	3/4 stars

The Indianapolis Star deemed the album "a savory blend of jazz, country and world beat—with a generous dollop of funk, just for fun." The Morning Call stated that it "blends the Flecktones' high-tech electronics with Fleck's lyrical, often melodic playing."

In his AllMusic review, music critic Thom Owens wrote of the album: "Though the Flecktones didn't change their formula with their third album, UFO Tofu, they did manage to craft one of their more consistent and impressive efforts... Occasionally, the material is lightweight, functioning only as vehicle for the group's solos. Then again, the whole point of Fleck's music is the solos, so that shouldn't upset his fans too much. Of course, it doesn't help him win new ones, either."

== Track listing ==
All songs by Béla Fleck unless otherwise noted.

1. "The West County" – 4:30
2. "Sex in a Pan" (Victor Wooten) – 3:33
3. "Nemo's Dream" – 5:07
4. "Bonnie & Slyde" – 4:18
5. "Scuttlebutt" – 4:04
6. "UFO Tofu" – 3:46
7. "Magic Fingers" – 5:13
8. "True North" – 4:54
9. "Life Without Elvis" – 5:06
10. "Seresta" (Howard Levy, Manfredo Fest) – 3:39
11. "The Yee-Haw Factor" – 6:57
12. "After the Storm" – 3:52

== Personnel ==
- Béla Fleck – acoustic (tracks 1–3, 6–8, 11, 12), slide (track 4), electric (track 5) & nylon strung (tracks 9, 10) banjos, synth (track 9)
- Howard Levy – diatonic harmonicas (G, A, Bb, C & D) (tracks 1–4, 7, 9–12), piano (tracks 1, 3, 4, 6–10), Yamaha CP-70 (track 5), synthesizers (tracks 1, 3, 4, 12), Hammond B3 Organ (tracks 7, 11), pennywhistle (track 8) & ocarina (track 11)
- Future Man – Synth-Axe Drumitar
- Victor Wooten – 4 string bass, 5 string bass, 5 string fretless bass (tracks 1, 4, 12), stereo effect (track 2) & 6 string bass (tracks 8, 10)
- Bil VornDick – engineer

== Chart positions ==
Year	Chart	Position
1992	Billboard Top Contemporary Jazz Albums	5
