= Victor Wooten =

American bassist (born 1964)

- Victor Wooten playing his Fodera bass at a concert in Oslo, 2018

Background information
- Born: Victor Lemonte Wooten; September 11, 1964 (age 62); Mountain Home, Idaho, U.S.
- Genres: Jazz fusion; jazz funk; bluegrass; pop; progressive rock
- Occupations: Musician, songwriter, record producer
- Instruments: Bass guitar; double bass; cello
- Years active: 1971–present
- Member of: Béla Fleck and the Flecktones; Bass Extremes; The Wooten Brothers
- Formerly of: Vital Tech Tones; SMV; Nitro
- Website: victorwooten.com

Victor Lemonte Wooten (born September 11, 1964) is an American bassist, songwriter, record producer, writer and teacher. He has been the bassist for Béla Fleck and the Flecktones since the group's formation in 1988 and a member of the bass supergroup SMV (2008–2009) with two other bassists, Stanley Clarke and Marcus Miller. From 2017 to 2019, he recorded as the bassist for the metal band Nitro.

He owns Vix Records which releases his albums. He wrote the novel The Music Lesson: A Spiritual Search for Growth Through Music, published on April 1, 2008. He later released the book's sequel, The Spirit of Music: The Lesson Continues, on February 2, 2021.

Wooten is the recipient of five Grammy Awards. He won the Bass Player of the Year award from Bass Player magazine three times and is the first person to win the award more than once. In 2011, he was ranked No. 10 in the Top 10 Bassists of All Time by readers of Rolling Stone magazine.

In 2018–2019, Wooten was diagnosed with focal dystonia, a rare neurological condition, in his hands and upper body, which had been limiting his ability to play in previous years, but has since abated somewhat.

== Early life and career ==
Born to Dorothy and Elijah Wooten on September 11, 1964 outside of Boise, Idaho. Victor is the youngest of the five children in the family, his brothers being: Regi, Roy, Rudy, and Joseph Wooten. As a United States Air Force family, they moved often when Victor was young. Regi began to teach Victor to play bass when he was two, by using an electric guitar to play bass parts, and Victor quickly joined the family band "The Wooten Brothers". By the time Victor was 5, when the family was living in Hawaii, the family band was playing in nightclubs and theaters, and in 1972, Victor and his brothers were hired to play as opening band on the west coast of Curtis Mayfields Superfly tour, when the Wooten family was living in Sacramento, California.

The family settled in Newport News, Virginia, in 1972. Victor graduated from Denbigh High School in 1982.

The Wooten Brothers kept performing throughout the 70s. In the early 80s, The Wooten Brothers went through a record deal with Arista that left the band members temporarily separated from each other. In 1981, while Victor was looking for a new job, Roy Wooten recommended Victor for the job at Busch Gardens theme park playing bluegrass fiddle in their Good Time Country Show. Victor, never having played the fiddle, loaned a violin from his high schools orchestra teacher, and after a short time practicing popular bluegrass fiddle tunes, won the audition. The Wooten Brothers performed in Busch Gardens "on and off" until 1987, where Victor later ended up playing bass as well. Victor has mentioned in certain interviews that this phase in his life wasn't his favorite, and that "some of the memories that happened [there] aren't good ones"; however in others he expressed that his time at Busch Gardens was an "amazing time" and saying that his years playing bluegrass and country music at the theme park made him learn to love that music style "from the inside".

While working at Busch Gardens, Victor made a few friends that ended up leading him to Béla Fleck, with whom Victor has collaborated frequently starting in the 90s. One of these friends was a banjo player at the park who introduced Victor to Béla. Victor has recounted that interaction: "I'd get on my friend John's banjo and I'd play my bass stuff. My same intervals ... and it would come out so weird, I mean just the weirdest stuff. ... But my friend said 'Man, you sound like Béla Fleck!'", at which point John showed Victor New Grass Revival, which really impressed Victor. Another friend was a violin player Kurt Story. In 1987, Victor went to visit Story in Nashville, which was Story's home town, and during the visit he introduced Victor to Béla via a telephone call. Some time later in the late 80s Victor came back to Nashville, and during that second visit Victor and Béla met in person and started collaborating, starting with a performance on The Lonesome Pine Special television show.

In 2000, Wooten created a music program called Bass/Nature camp that was expanded into Victor Wooten's Center for Music and Nature and includes all instruments. His camps are at Wooten Woods, a 147-acre retreat in Only, Tennessee, near Nashville. Wooten co-leads the "Victor Wooten/Berklee Summer Bass Workshop" at Berklee College of Music in Boston. At Berklee and his own camps, he collaborates with Berklee Bass Department chair Steve Bailey. The two bassists have been teaching together since the early 1990s.

Wooten was featured on the May/June 2014 cover of Making Music magazine to discuss the camps.

He has cited Larry Graham, Marcus Miller, Stanley Clarke, James Jamerson, Jaco Pastorius, Bootsy Collins, Paul McCartney, Chuck Rainey, John Entwistle, Ray Brown, and Ron Carter as significant influences on his bass playing.

== Instruments ==
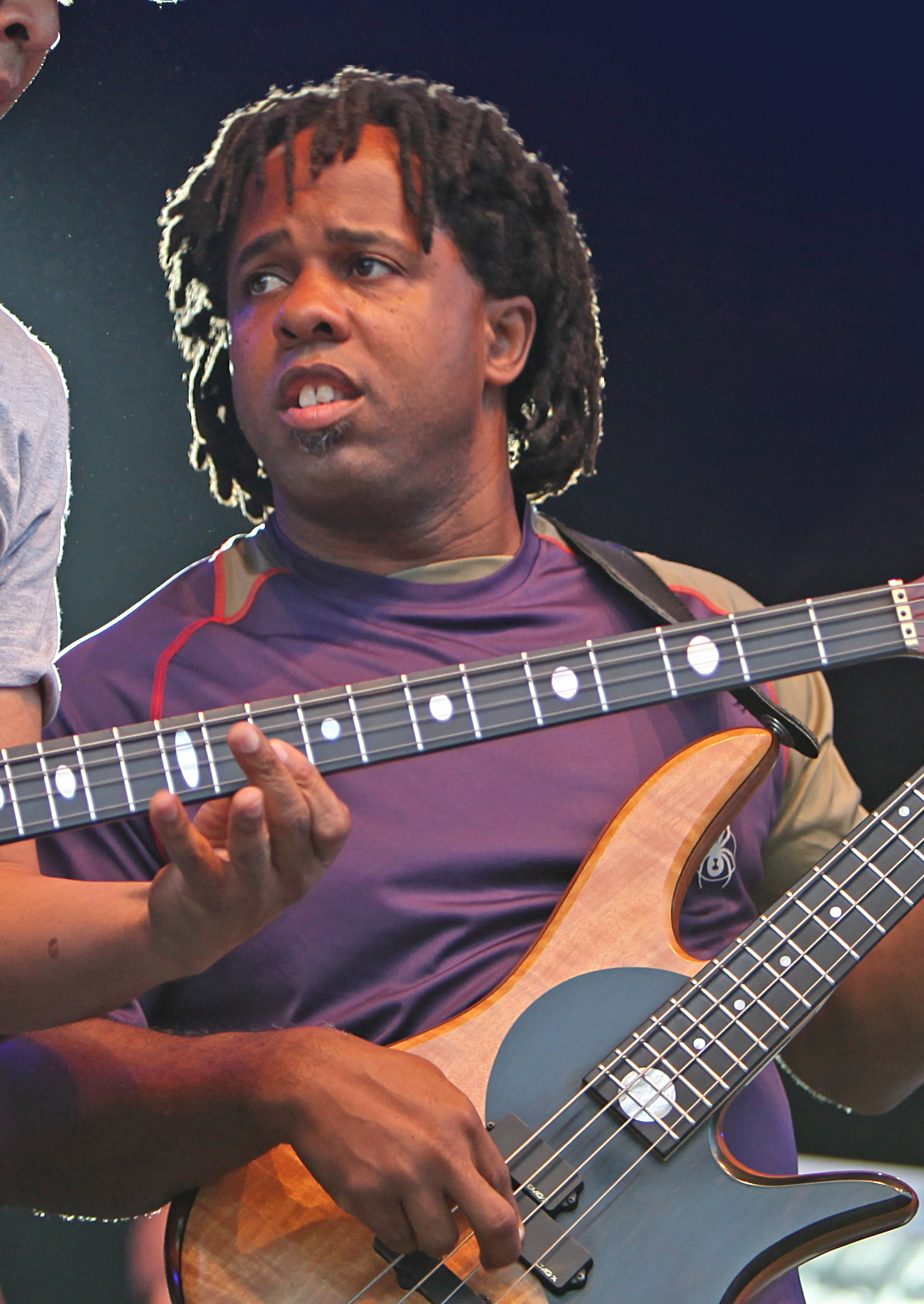
Wooten performing in 2009 on his Ying Yang Fodera bass

Wooten's first electric bass was a Univox, which, in 1977, was followed by an Alembic Series 1 that Wooten got due to his admiration of Stanley Clarke, who is known for playing an Alembic.

Wooten is most often seen playing Fodera basses, of which he has a signature model. His most famous Fodera, a 1983 Monarch Deluxe he refers to as "number 1" sports a Kahler Tremolo System model 2400 bridge. Fodera's "Yin Yang" basses (co-designed by and created for Wooten) incorporates the Yin Yang symbol—which Wooten uses in various media—as a focal point of the top's design and construction. The symbol is created from two pieces of naturally finished wood (Ebony and Holly, for example), fitted together to create the Yin-Yang pattern.

As well as playing electric bass (both fretted and fretless) and the double bass, he played cello in high school. He still plays cello occasionally with the Flecktones as well as having played the instrument in the 2012 Sword and Stone/Words and Tones tour.

== Discography ==
=== Solo albums ===
- A Show of Hands (Compass, 1996)
- What Did He Say? (Compass, 1997)
- Yin-Yang (Compass, 1999)
- Live in America (Compass, 2001)
- Soul Circus (Vanguard, 2005)
- Palmystery (Heads Up, 2008)
- The Music Lesson (Vix, 2011)
- Words & Tones (Vix, 2012)
- Sword & Stone (Vix, 2012)
- Trypnotyx (Vix, 2017)

=== As the Wootens ===
- The Wootens, with the Wootens (Arista, 1985)

=== As Bass Extremes – with Steve Bailey ===
- Cookbook (Tone Center, 1998)
- Just Add Water (Tone Center, 2001)
- S'Low Down (Vix, 2022)

=== As Vital Tech Tones ===
With Scott Henderson and Steve Smith

- Vital Tech Tones (Tone Center, 1998)
- VTT2 (Tone Center, 2000)

=== As SMV ===
Collaboration with Stanley Clarke and Marcus Miller

- Thunder (Heads Up, 2008)

=== With Béla Fleck and the Flecktones ===
- Béla Fleck and the Flecktones (Warner Bros., 1990)
- Flight of the Cosmic Hippo (Warner Bros., 1991)
- UFO Tofu (Warner Bros., 1992)
- Three Flew Over the Cuckoo's Nest (Warner Bros., 1993)
- Live Art (Warner Bros., 1996)
- Left of Cool (Warner Bros., 1998)
- Greatest Hits of the 20th Century (Warner Bros., 1999)
- Outbound (Columbia, 2000)
- Live at the Quick (Columbia, 2002)
- Little Worlds (Columbia, 2003)
- Ten From Little Worlds (Columbia, 2003)
- The Hidden Land (Columbia, 2006)
- Jingle All the Way (Rounder, 2008)
- Rocket Science (eOne, 2011)

=== As sideman ===
With Jeff Coffin

- Mutopia (Compass, 2008)
- The Inside of the Outside (Ear Up, 2015)

With Bootsy Collins

- Tha Funk Capital of the World (Mascot, 2011)
- World Wide Funk (Mascot, 2017)

With Bill Evans

- Soulgrass (BHM, 2005)
- The Other Side of Something (Intuition, 2007)

With David Grier

- Lone Soldier (Rounder, 1995)
- Evocative (Dreadnought, 2009)

With Mike Stern

- These Times (ESC, 2003)
- Who Let the Cats Out? (Heads Up, 2006)
- All Over the Place (Heads Up, 2012)
- Trip (Heads Up, 2017)

With others

- Darol Anger, Heritage (Six Degrees, 1997)
- Steve Bailey, Evolution (Victor, 1994)
- Eric Bibb, Jericho Road (DixieFrog, 2013)
- Paul Brady, Spirits Colliding (Fontana 1995)
- Alex Bugnon, 107 degrees in the Shade (Orpheus/Epic, 1991)
- Larry Coryell, Cause and Effect (Tone Center, 1998)
- John Cowan, Sixty (Compass, 2014)
- The Duhks, The Duhks (Sugar Hill, 2005)
- Stuart Duncan, Stuart Duncan (Rounder, 1992)
- Tommy Emmanuel, Little by Little (Favored Nations, 2010)
- Béla Fleck, Tales from the Acoustic Planet (Warner Bros., 1995)
- Gov't Mule, The Deepest End (Evangeline, 2003)
- Greg Howe and Dennis Chambers, Extraction (Tone Center, 2003)
- India Arie, Testimony: Vol. 1, Life & Relationship (Motown, 2006)
- Keb Mo, The Reflection (Yolabelle, 2011)
- Buckshot LeFonque, Buckshot LeFonque (Columbia, 1994)
- Natalie MacMaster, Blueprint (Rounder, 2003)
- Dave Matthews Band, Live in Chicago at the United Center 12.19.98 (RCA, 2001)
- Jaco Pastorius Big Band, Word of Mouth Revisited (Heads Up, 2003)
- Mark O'Connor, The New Nashville Cats (Warner Bros., 1991)
- Charlie Peacock, Love Press Ex-Curio (Runway Network, 2005)
- Jonathan Scales, Jonathan Scales Fourchestra (Ropeadope, 2013)
- Shane Theriot, Highway 90 (Shose, 2000)
- Steve Weingart, Dialogue (Skeewa Music, 2011)
- Matt White, Worlds Wide (Ear Up, 2017)
- Keller Williams, Dream (SCI Fidelity, 2007)
- Octavision, Coexist (Independent, 2020)
- Cory Wong, Direct Flyte (Roundwound, 2022)
- Bootsy Collins, Fantaazma, Branford Marsalis, "Hip Hop Lollipop" (single) (Bootzilla Records, 2022)
- Bootsy Collins, Baby Triggy, Fantaazma, Marcus Miller, Dennis Chambers, Cindy Blackman Santana, Alissia Benveniste, Dave Stewart, Marlon McClain, Buckethead, Lachlan Doley, "Funk Not Fight" (single) (Bootzilla Records, 2023)

== Bibliography ==
- The Music Lesson: A Spiritual Search for Growth Through Music, ISBN 978-0-425-22093-1, Penguin Group, 2008
- The Spirit of Music: The Lesson Continues, ISBN 978-0-593-08166-2, Penguin Group, 2021
