= Sandip Burman =

Indian tabla player (born 1969)

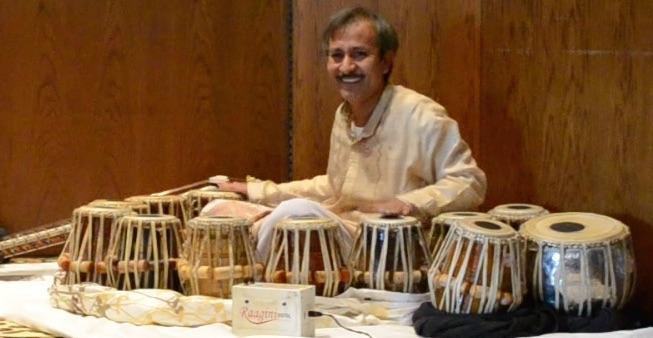
- Sandip Burman at the University of Chicago in 2015

Background information
- Born: Sandip Barman; 21 March 1969 (age 57); Calcutta, India
- Genres: Indian Classical, Jazz, Fusion, World Music, Western Classical
- Instruments: Tabla, Tabla tarang, Sitar
- Years active: 1987–present
- Website: www.SandipBurman.com

Sandip Burman (born 1969) is a tabla player from Durgapur, West Bengal, India.

== Life ==
After his initial training with Shri Sudhir Roy, Burman began a long discipleship with Pandit Shymal Bose. His initial trip to the USA was sponsored by Maharishi Mahesh Yogi.

Sandip formerly toured 170 days out of the year, with such dates as solo performances at the Kennedy Center (Washington D.C.), Getty Museum (Los Angeles), Street Scene (San Diego), First Night Providence (Rhode Island), House of Blues Chicago, Nelson Atkins Museum (Kansas City), Ravinia Festival (Chicago), Skirball Cultural Center (Los Angeles), Chamber Music Festival (Santa Fe), and many others.

== Teaching ==
Burman has been a visiting faculty member at the Rotterdam Conservatory in the Netherlands and has toured and taught in the United States, Europe, Australia, New Zealand, Mexico, Singapore, North Africa, Israel, and Canada.

Before concerts, Burman often takes the time to conduct music clinics at the local high schools and universities. He improvises. After he performs on sitar he leaves a portion of the clinic open for questions to get to know him and learn from him. Then he moves to his expertise, the tabla. His hands fly through the drums at lightning speed and precision filling the area with a melody rather than a beat.

== Collaborations ==
Sandip has played as a guest with countless jazz greats, including Jack DeJohnette, Al Di Meola, John Medeski, Nels Cline, Stanton Moore, Skerik, Andy Narell, "East Meets Jazz" with Victor Bailey, Randy Brecker, Jerry Goodman, Paul Bollenback, Dave Pietro, and many others. The tour ended suddenly and early due to the 9/11 attack but closed at The Lyric with a standing room only show the night of 9/11 that is still talked about years later. The band's Producer & Manager (Chuck Hawks) was noted as saying despite the stresses of the day, it turned out to be one of the band's best performances of the entire tour.

Sandip worked with Danny Elfman and contributed to the soundtrack of Tim Burton's film, Mars Attacks!, and an IBM commercial. Sandip has recorded with L. Subramaniam and is showcased on the album Global Fusion from Warner Brothers. He appeared on the Béla Fleck and the Flecktones album The Big Band: Live at the Quick.
