= Béla Fleck and the Flecktones =

American jazz-bluegrass band

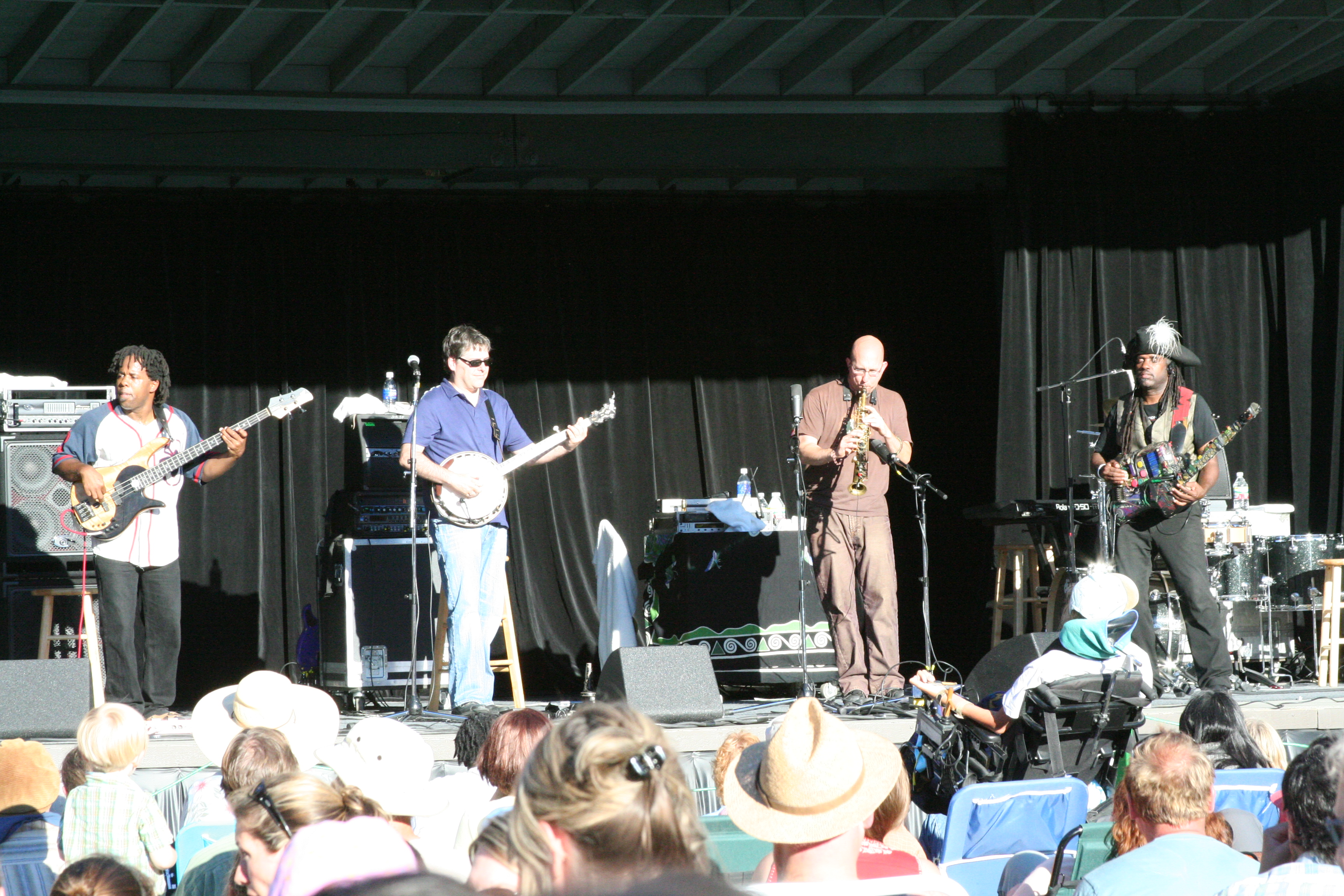
- Victor Wooten, Béla Fleck, Jeff Coffin, and Future Man

Background information
- Origin: Nashville, Tennessee, U.S.
- Genres: Jazz fusion; progressive bluegrass; jam band
- Years active: 1988–2012, 2016–present
- Labels: Warner Bros., Columbia, Sony BMG, Rounder
- Members: Béla Fleck; Victor Wooten; Roy "Future Man" Wooten; Howard Levy
- Past members: Jeff Coffin
- Website: www.flecktones.com

Béla Fleck and the Flecktones is an American jazz fusion band that is known for its eclectic style and instrumentation, combining jazz improvisation with progressive bluegrass, rock, classical, funk, and world music traditions.

The Flecktones formed in 1988 when Béla Fleck was invited to perform on the PBS TV series The Lonesome Pine Specials. The original members were Fleck on banjo, Victor Wooten on bass guitar, his brother Roy "Future Man" Wooten on Drumitar, and Howard Levy on harmonica and keyboards. After Levy's departure in 1992 the group continued as a trio for several years until recruiting Jeff Coffin in 1997 on saxophones. Coffin quit the group in 2010, and Levy rejoined in 2011.

== History ==
=== Formation ===
Near the end of his time with the New Grass Revival band, Fleck was invited to play for the Lonesome Pine Special on PBS in 1988, and he gathered a group of musicians to assist him. He had met Howard Levy the year before at the Winnipeg Folk Festival. Victor Wooten auditioned over the phone and volunteered his brother Roy as a potential member. After the PBS performance, Fleck decided to keep the group together, calling it Bela Fleck and the Flecktones and using it to explore a more complex series of his own compositions.

The Flecktones merged bluegrass with jazz, presenting record store owners with the problem of selecting a genre under which to stock their whimsically titled albums, whose covers bore cartoons. The leader played electric banjo and was influenced by the Kentucky bluegrass of Earl Scruggs and "The Ballad of Jed Clampett". Victor Wooten broke into jazz bass solos. Roy Wooten called himself "Future Man" and played drumitar, an instrument which he'd developed by linking a customised SynthAxe guitar synthesizer controller to drum sounds. Melodies were usually taken by Howard Levy.

The first Flecktones video, "Sinister Minister", was in rotation at the networks VH-1, which played pop and adult contemporary music; BET, the Black Entertainment channel; and Country Music Television. The band performed initially at jazz festivals, as well as with soul singer Stevie Wonder, blues guitarist Bonnie Raitt, and the Christian a cappella group Take 6. Followers of the Grateful Dead took note.

=== Recording ===
The band's debut album, Béla Fleck and the Flecktones (Warner Bros, 1989), received a Grammy nomination for Best Contemporary Jazz Album, as did their second album, Flight of the Cosmic Hippo (Warner Bros., 1991), which also received a nomination for Best Instrumental Composition for the song "Blu-Bop" and contained the Flecktones's version of "The Star-Spangled Banner". Their next album had another cartoon cover and the palindromic title UFO TOFU (Warner Bros., 1992). One of its songs, "Bonnie & Slyde", had Fleck playing banjo atypically with a slide, an idea suggested to him by slide guitarist Bonnie Raitt.

UFO Tofu would be the last album the Flecktones recorded with their original lineup until Rocket Science in 2011. Howard Levy left the band in December 1992. While the departure of Levy was tough for the band, it was not unexpected. During their 1992 tour it became evident to the band that Levy was not happy with the rigors of touring and wanted to spend more time with his wife and children.

The remaining trio, consisting of Fleck and the Wooten brothers, recorded their fourth album, Three Flew Over the Cuckoo's Nest. "'Once we started rehearsing, everything was fine,' said Fleck. 'We started finding ways to sound good, and it was real exciting.'" Without Levy, the Flecktones as usual spent most of 1993 on the road and released Three Flew Over the Cuckoo's Nest in September of that year. The band continued to tour for the next couple of years. 1996 saw the release of the live album Live Art, featuring recordings made over a four-year touring period which also saw the core Flecktones trio (plus, on some tunes, Levy) collaborating with assorted jazz and bluegrass musicians including Sam Bush, Branford Marsalis, Chick Corea, and Bruce Hornsby.

=== Return to quartet ===
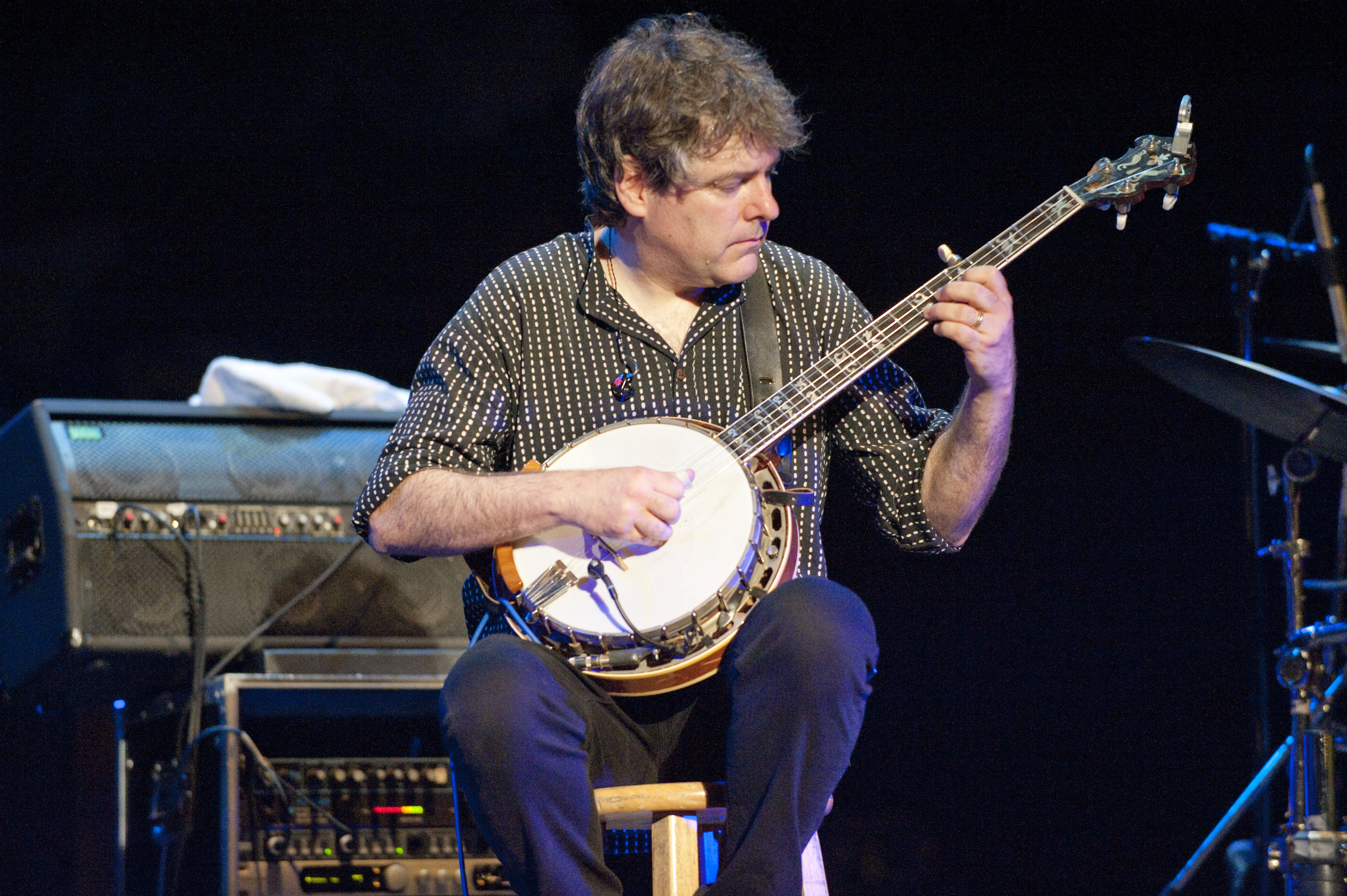
Béla Fleck in Raleigh, North Carolina, June 6, 2011

In April 1997, the Flecktones became a quartet again, as they added saxophone player Jeff Coffin to the mix. In June 1997, the Flecktones opened for the Dave Matthews Band. In July the Flecktones toured Europe and sat in on the second set of a Phish show in Lyon, France. This marked the second and final time that the Flecktones played with Phish.

In June 1998, the Flecktones released their sixth album, and fifth studio album, Left of Cool. It represented a switch from previous Flecktones albums, as the band, according to critic Terri Horak, "jettisoned their self-imposed rule to only record what could be duplicated on live instruments." In July 2000, the Flecktones released their seventh album, Outbound, another studio album. The Flecktones' philosophy with this album was to do something different from everything they had done before. What makes Outbound unique is the way in which the Flecktones recorded the album. The quartet recorded each track on the album, then invited guest musicians to overdub vocals or instrumentation. Outbound guests include Jon Anderson from Yes, Shawn Colvin, and John Medeski, of Medeski, Martin and Wood, to name a few.

Live at the Quick, which was also released as a DVD, is the band's eighth album and second live album. For fans of live Flecktones, this album, like Live Art, successfully captured the sound and feel of the Flecktones in concert.

In February 2006, the band released their tenth album, The Hidden Land. As with every Flecktones album, they needed to change something from their last album. For The Hidden Land, the Flecktones didn't want any guest musicians. "'The truth is, the last few records are not what we are,' Fleck said. 'Obviously, we loved playing with those musicians, but if you keep on doing it, you become a gathering point rather than a group with its own identity.'" For the Flecktones to keep moving forward, they felt their music had to get back to the roots of the quartet.

Jeff Coffin amicably left the band in 2010 to join the Dave Matthews Band. Original member Howard Levy rejoined the following year in 2011, when the band recorded and released their eleventh album Rocket Science.

In June 2012, following another summer tour, the Flecktones announced their hiatus as a band.

=== Reunion ===
In January 2016, the Flecktones announced a short reunion tour scheduled for June 2016, confirming an appearance at the Telluride Bluegrass Festival on June 16, 2016. In 2017, the band announced concerts for June–August 2017, and also confirmed a tour with Chick Corea Elektric Band in August 2017.

== Critical reception ==
Thom Jurek of AllMusic.com called the Flecktones's music an "unclassifiable meld of jazz, progressive bluegrass, rock, classical, funk, and world music traditions," a style sometimes dubbed "blu-bop".

Of the album Béla Fleck and the Flecktones, critic Geoffrey Himes wrote "Fleck's banjo-playing takes the quartet on wide tangents through the outer space of jazz improvisation and minimalist composition, but he always brings them back to the traditions of rural America."

The quartet received attention for their musical innovations and invention, including praise from music critic Bill Kolhaase. However, he was critical of the band's lack of a drum kit, claiming that Wooten's "electronic beat seemed a bit muddy compared to the real thing".

Cosmic Hippo was received favorably. Himes applauded their prodigious improvisatory ability. John Griffin of The Gazette also praised the group's ability to create such an individual style that "the whole of idea of style disappears." Mike Joyce, of The Washington Post was impressed by the Flecktones' ability to maintain a distinct voice. Joyce called a Flecktones show a "musical free-for-all, embracing the band's recorded material and venturing off into the great unknown." Jim Santella of The Buffalo News praised the band's mastery of styles and their ability to weave together complicated pieces. Santella even compared Fleck's playing to a "miniature Bach canon."

Geoffrey Himes remarked that Left of Cool sounded too ordinary. In his negative review he wrote, "Unfortunately the Flecktones' first studio album in five years reveals that they've become a very ordinary band." Himes adds, "The four Flecktones are all marvelous musicians, and they come up with imaginative parts for the new album's 15 cuts. The overall concept, however has diminished into easy-to-digest pop-jazz, for which there is too much already."

Hidden Land received mixed reviews. Critic Michael Endelman of Entertainment Weekly, wrote that the Flecktones sound "hasn't aged well." Dan Ouelette of Billboard found Hidden Land to be "by far their best album." Ouelette was particularly impressed by the quartet's range of repertoire in this album.

Jingle All the Way was well received. Geoffrey Himes praised the band for being able to package the Flecktones' complex sound into an easily digestible holiday album without having to compromise.

Jeff Kelman of Jazz Times wrote favorably about Rocket Science and Levy's reunion with the Flecktones, "Rocket Science recaptures everything that made the Flecktones so fresh, so innovative, so important during its first five years." Kelman particularly praised the album's writing and the interactions between Levy and Fleck. AllMusic critic Thom Jurek also gave Rocket Science a rave review, writing that "Rocket Science fires on all cylinders and comes off as a fresh and exciting reintroduction to a newly energized Flecktones."

== Awards and honors ==
Year	Award	Work	Result
1990	Grammy Award for Best Jazz Instrumental Album	Béla Fleck and the Flecktones	Nominated
1991	Grammy Award for Best Jazz Instrumental Album	Flight of the Cosmic Hippo	Nominated
1991	Grammy Award for Best Instrumental Composition	"Blu-Bop"	Nominated
1992	Grammy Award for Best Instrumental Composition	"Magic Fingers"	Nominated
1997	Grammy Award for Best Pop Instrumental Performance	"Sinister Minister"	Won
1998	Grammy Award for Best Instrumental Composition	"Almost 12"	Won
1998	Grammy Award for Best Pop Instrumental Performance	"Big Country"	Nominated
2000	Grammy Award for Best Contemporary Jazz Album	Outbound	Won
2000	Grammy Award for Best Pop Instrumental Performance	"Zona Mona"	Nominated
2006	Grammy Award for Best Contemporary Jazz Album	The Hidden Land	Won
2006	Grammy Award for Best Pop Instrumental Performance	"Subterfuge"	Nominated
2009	Grammy Award for Best Pop Instrumental Album	Jingle All the Way	Won
2012	Grammy Award for Best Instrumental Composition	"Life in Eleven"	Won
2018	Miles Davis Award (Montreal International Jazz Festival)	entire body of work	Won

== Discography ==
Béla Fleck and the Flecktones have 10 studio albums, 2 live albums, and 1 compilation album.

=== Studio albums ===
- Béla Fleck and the Flecktones (1990)
- Flight of the Cosmic Hippo (1991)
- UFO Tofu (1992)
- Three Flew Over the Cuckoo's Nest (1993)
- Left of Cool (1998)
- Outbound (2000)
- Little Worlds (2003)
- The Hidden Land (2006)
- Jingle All the Way (2008)
- Rocket Science (2011)

=== Live albums ===
- Live Art (1996)
- Live at the Quick (2002)
- Flying Saucer Dudes (2015) (1991 performance)

=== Compilation albums ===
- Greatest Hits of the 20th Century (1999)

== Band members ==
- Béla Fleck – banjo, synthesizers, guitar (since 1988)
- Victor Wooten – bass guitar, double bass, cello (since 1988)
- Roy Wooten ("Future Man") – drumitar, drums, percussion, electronic drums (since 1988)
- Howard Levy – harmonica, piano, keyboards, synthesizers, jaw harp (1988–1993, since 2010)

Former

- Jeff Coffin – saxophone, flute, clarinet, synthesizers (1998–2010)
