= Howard Levy =

American musician

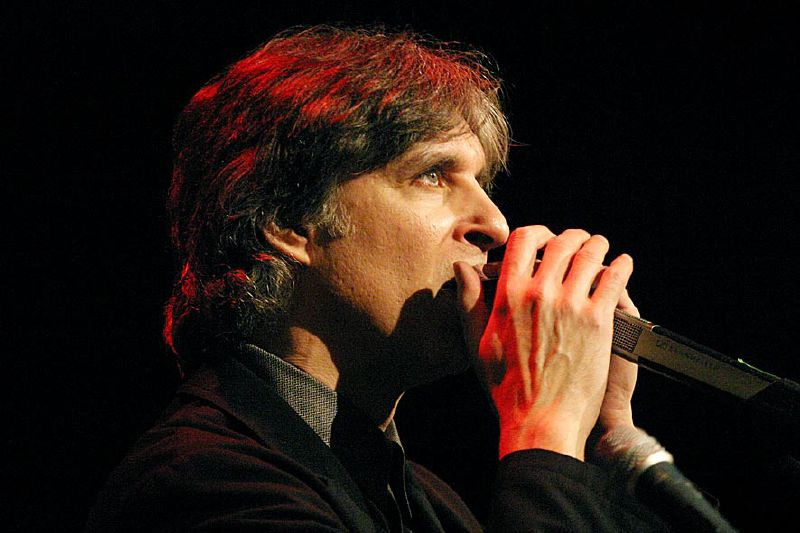
- Howard Levy in concert

Background information
- Born: July 31, 1951 (age 74); Brooklyn, New York, U.S.
- Genres: Jazz fusion, Latin, folk, funk, world
- Occupations: Musician; composer; record label owner
- Instruments: Harmonica; keyboards; jaw harp
- Years active: 1970s–present
- Label: Balkan Samba
- Website: levyland.com

Howard Levy (born July 31, 1951) is an American musician. A keyboardist and virtuoso harmonica player, he "has been realistically presented as one of the most important and radical harmonica innovators of the twentieth century."

In 1988, Levy was a founding member of Béla Fleck and the Flecktones, with whom he won a 1997 Grammy Award for Best Pop Instrumental Performance for the song "The Sinister Minister". He also won a Grammy for Best Instrumental Composition in 2012 for "Life in Eleven", a song written with Béla Fleck for the Flecktones' album Rocket Science (2011). He has worked with Arab-fusion musician Rabih Abou-Khalil, Latin jazz saxophonist Paquito D'Rivera, Donald Fagen, and Paul Simon.

== Career ==
Levy was born in Brooklyn, New York, and attended the Manhattan School of Music, where he studied piano and pipe organ. For two years, he went to Northwestern University in Evanston, Illinois, and participated in the jazz band. He is the Harmonica Lessons instructor for ArtistWorks.

=== Harmonica innovator ===
Levy plays in many genres: jazz, classical, rock, folk, Latin, blues, country, and world music. He drew attention for his chromatic playing style on a regular diatonic harmonica. He discovered the overblow and overdraw techniques for chromatic playing in 1970. These allow a harmonica player to obtain all the missing chromatic notes in the Richter-tuned diatonic harmonica.

In 1995, he performed the "Harmonia Mundi Suite for Harmonica and Chamber Ensemble" in Chicago. He composed a concerto for harmonica in 2001 and performed it with orchestras in the U.S. and Europe.

=== Forming groups ===
In 1988, Levy co-founded Béla Fleck and the Flecktones. He won a Grammy for Pop Instrumental for the song "The Sinister Minister". He left the band in 1992. Levy toured with Kenny Loggins and appeared on his album Outside from the Redwoods. Levy returned to the Flecktones in 2011, touring and recording the album Rocket Science (2011).

In the 1990s Levy founded Trio Globo with Eugene Friesen and Glen Velez. He leads another band, Acoustic Express and is music director of the Latin jazz group Chévere de Chicago.

He is the founder of Balkan Samba Records. The roster includes Chévere de Chicago, Alberto Mizrahi and Trio Globo, Fox Fehling, and Norman Savitt.

=== Touring and recording with others ===
Levy has toured or recorded with Kenny Loggins, John Prine, Ben Sidran, Bob Gibson, Bobby McFerrin, Bryan Bowers, Chris Siebold, Chuck Mangione, Claudio Roditi, David Bromberg, Styx, Dennis DeYoung, Dolly Parton, Donald Fagen, Holly Cole, Jerry Butler, Mark Nauseef, Miroslav Tadic, Paquito D'Rivera, Pete Seeger, Steve Goodman, Terry Callier, and Tom Paxton.

== Gear ==
Levy favors an equal temperament tuning and plays harmonicas customized by Joe Filisko.

== Discography ==
As leader or co-leader

- Carnival of Souls (Silver Wave, 1995)
- The Old Country (M.A., 1996)
- The Stranger's Hand (Tone Center, 1999) with Jerry Goodman, Oteil Burbridge, and Steve Smith
- Cappuccino with Fox Fehling (Balkan Samba, 2004)
- Secret Dream (Balkan Samba, 2005)
- Howard Levy & Paul Sprawl (Balkan Samba, 2005)
- Time Capsules (Balkan Samba, 2009)
- Tonight and Tomorrow (CD Baby/Chicago Sessions, 2009)
- Silver & Black (Enja, 2009)
- Concerto for Diatonic Harmonica & Orchestra (Balkan Samba, 2010)
- Alone and Together (Balkan Samba, 2010)
- Steering by the Stars (Stonecutter, 2010)
- Out of the Box (Balkan Samba, 2012)
- Matzah to Menorah (Balkan Samba, 2012)
- First Takes (Balkan Samba, 2014)
- Tango and Jazz (Balkan Samba, 2016)
- Art + Adrenaline with Chris Siebold (Balkan Samba, 2018)

With Béla Fleck and the Flecktones

- Béla Fleck and the Flecktones (Warner Bros., 1990)
- Flight of the Cosmic Hippo (Warner Bros., 1991)
- UFO Tofu (Warner Bros., 1992)
- Live Art (Warner Bros., 1996)
- Rocket Science (eOne, 2011)

With Rabih Abou-Khalil

- The Sultan's Picnic (Enja, 1994)
- Odd Times (Enja, 1997)

With Samo Salamon

- Peaks of Light (Samo Records, 2018)

With John McCutcheon

- Howjadoo (Rounder, 1983)
- Winter Solstice (Rounder, 1984))
- Signs of the Times (Rounder, 1986, with Si Kahn)
- Gonna Rise Again (Rounder, 1987)
- Mail Myself to You (Rounder, 1988)
- Water from Another Time: A Retrospective (Rounder, 1989)
- What It's Like (Rounder, 1990)

With Pete Seeger

- Pete (Living Music, 1996)

With Lobster Newberg

- Tight Rope (Actress, 2009)

== Awards and honors ==
- Joseph Jefferson Award, Best Original Music for a Play (1986)
- Grammy Award for Best Pop Instrumental, "The Sinister Minister", Béla Fleck and the Flecktones (1997)
- Grammy Award for Best Instrumental Composition, "Life in Eleven" (2012)
