= Zendrum =

MIDI controller instrument

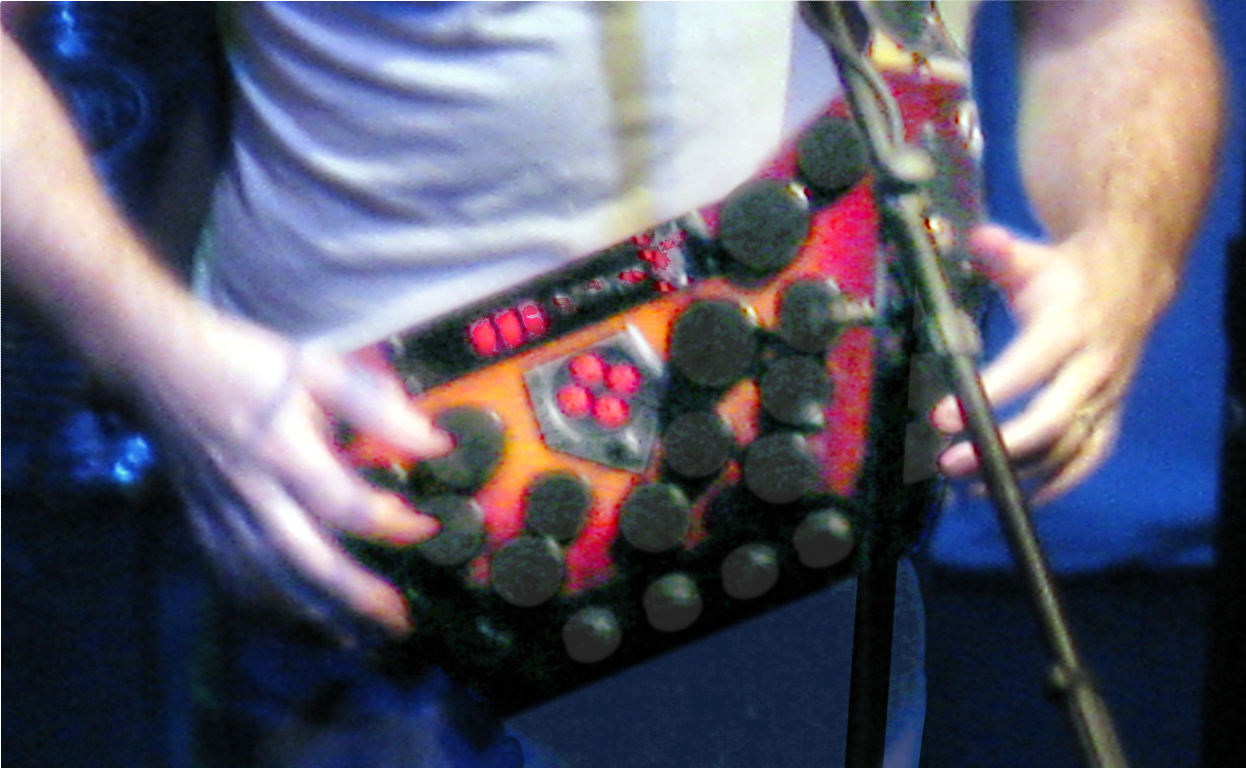
Zendrum LT played by Jonathan Coulton

A Zendrum is a hand-crafted MIDI controller that is used as a percussion instrument. The Zendrum was influenced by the "Drumitar," invented by Future Man. There are several Zendrum models that are well-suited for live performances: the Z1, ZX, EXP, ZAP series, LT and the Mallet Pro series and Melodic Finger. The Zendrum ZX and Z1 can be worn like a guitar and consists of a triangular hardwood body with 24 touch-sensitive round MIDI triggers. The EXP has 29 triggers and additional controls. The Zendrum LT can also be worn with a guitar strap, and has 25 MIDI triggers in a symmetrical layout, which provides an ambidextrous playing surface. The ZAP series is designed more for table top use or on a drum stand, with the ZAP1 having 19 triggers, and the ZAP2 having 25 triggers. The triggers are played by tapping or slapping with the fingers or hands. As a controller, the Zendrum does not make any sound by itself. It uses an electronic interface called MIDI to control synthesizers, samplers, drum machines, sound modules, computers or other electronic drum devices that generates the musical and percussive sounds. The Mallet Pro Series is laid out and played like a traditional mallet instrument, like a marimba. The Mallet Pro series has naturally resonating solid walnut bars as triggers.

== Playing ==
Once the Zendrum is hooked up via MIDI to a sound module, and connected to an amplified loudspeaker or headphones, the player can tap or slap the triggers. The triggers on a Zendrum are velocity sensitive, which means that the volume of each note depends on how hard the corresponding trigger is hit. Depending on what it is connected to, and how it is programmed or configured, the signal from the velocity level of the Zendrum's trigger can also be used to alter variances in timbre, panning, and other expressive aspects of the sound. The Zendrum is often used to play drum or percussion instrument parts, but it can also used to perform the sounds from tuned instruments, ranging from steel drums or vibraphone to piano, bass, guitar, or bells. Sustained sounds like organs or string orchestra "patches" can be played, but they require a different technique to control. A sustain pedal can be plugged into a Zendrum to allow the sound to sustain, otherwise, depending on how it is programmed to receive trigger signals, the sound will have a clipped or staccato feel.

The playing styles and techniques that work best on the Zendrum are quite different from those of a traditional acoustic drum. Traditional drumming (especially for a drum kit) requires a certain amount of "limb independence," whereas the Zendrum requires more "finger independence." Also, traditional drumming is more than just triggering sounds; a drummer playing a physical kit gets important feedback in the way his or her sticks bounce and react from the surfaces of the drums and cymbals. Depending on the technology and style of the MIDI drum kit, a player has varying levels of feedback similar to a traditional drum kit. The Zendrum (with the exception of the Mallet pro series) requires a playing technique similar to tapping one's fingers on a table, except that the Zendrum triggers are sensitive to velocity. The majority of the Zendrum models are designed to be worn like a guitar, allowing the player to stand up and walk around using either wired or wireless MIDI connections. Where a traditional drum kit can is typically played with 2 hands and 2 feet, the Zendrum can be triggered with all ten fingers and the palms of both hands much like a conga or other hand percussion instrument.

== History ==
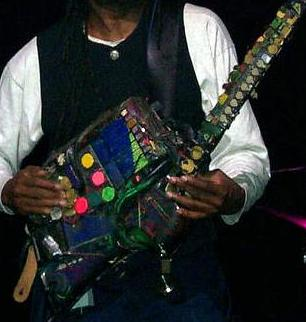
Drumitar — modified from a SynthAxe previously owned by jazz musician Lee Ritenour

MIDI sound generators have long been able to make realistic drum sounds, but the traditional keyboard of a synthesizer is not always well suited to playing percussion. MIDI triggers can be retrofitted onto the traditional drum kit to allow drummers to play synthesizer or sampled drum sounds (or other sounds) using their regular drum kit. In most live settings, drummers and percussionists are situated in the back of the stage, and limited in their movement. Futureman (a.k.a. Roy-El, a.k.a. Roy Wooten), the percussionist for Béla Fleck and the Flecktones, uses a Synthaxe Drumitar to trigger drum sounds on several MIDI sound modules, which allows him to move around on the stage. Inspired by Futureman's Drumitar in 1991, David Haney created his interpretation of a portable electronic drum trigger by using a triangular piece of wood and piezoelectric sensors as triggers. With friend, fellow drummer and co-inventor Kim Daniel, they refined the shape of the instrument. Originally, the first Zendrum used a 24 cable snake to trigger drum sound modules (one cable for each trigger), but then they upgraded it to MIDI in 1993 after a meeting with Peter Gabriel and Manu Katché. David and Kim patented their design in 1994. Starting in 1995, David Haney and Kim Daniel began a series of experiments with Futureman and engineer Chris deHaas to expand on the Zendrum idea and technology. In 2008, the Zendrum ZAP (Zendrum Articulated Programmer) was released. It is a smaller Zendrum with a hexagonal layout designed for studio and 'desktop' use. The Mallet Pro series and Melodic Finger controllers were added to the Zendrum family of instruments in late 2013 to early 2014.

== See also ==
- Percussion instrument
- Drum
- Drum kit
- Electronic drum
- Drum machine

Controllers

- MIDI
- SynthAxe
- Keytar
- List of keytars
