= Future Man =

American inventor, musician, and composer

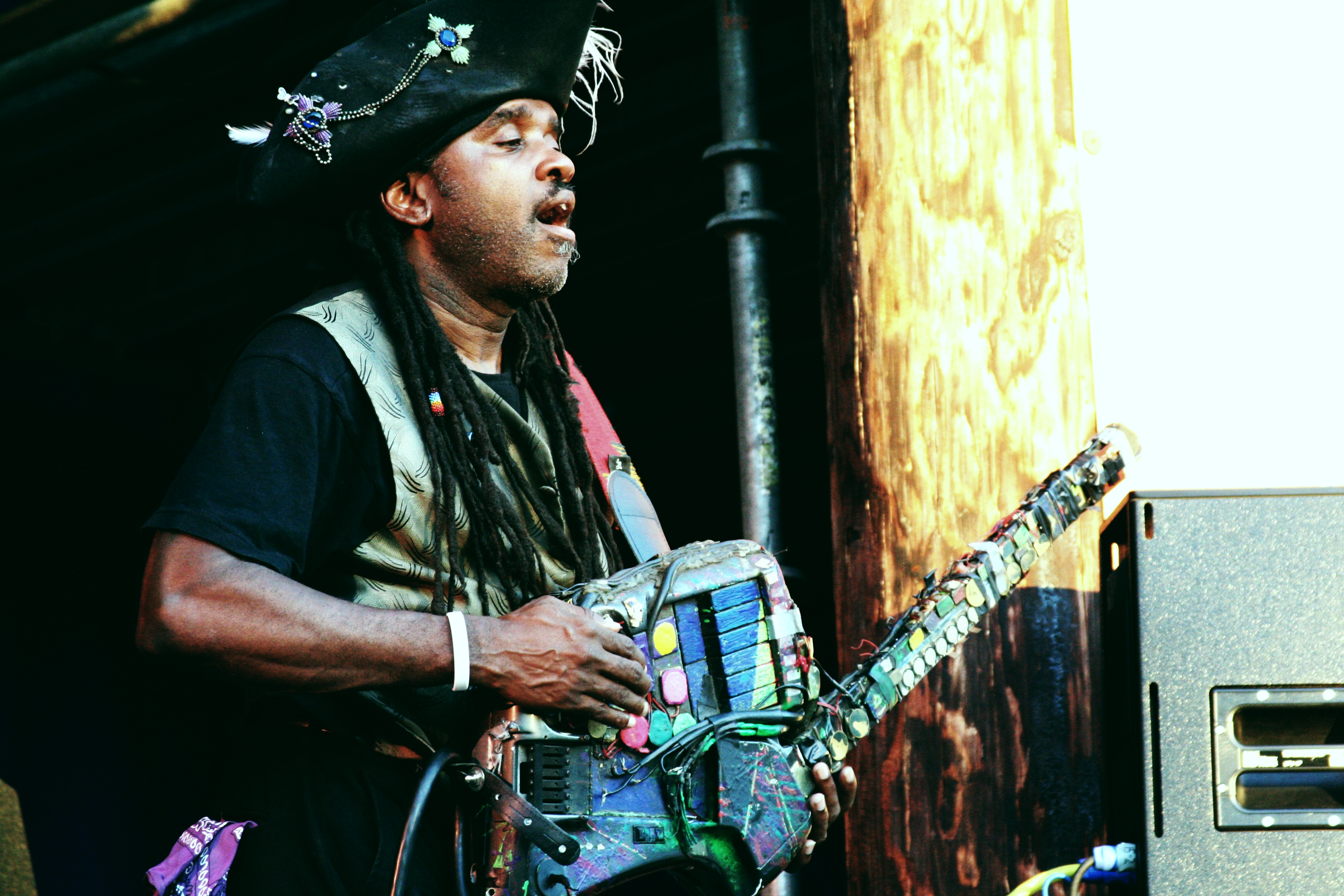
- Future Man with the Flecktones at the Woodland Park Zoo in 2007.

Background information
- Also known as: Futche
- Born: Roy Wilfred Wooten; October 13, 1957 (age 68); Hampton, Virginia, United States
- Genres: Jazz; jazz fusion
- Occupations: Musician; composer; inventor
- Instruments: Drumitar; Zendrum; SynthAxe; drums; vocals
- Labels: Warner Bros.; Columbia/Sony BMG
- Member of: Béla Fleck and the Flecktones

Roy Wilfred Wooten (born October 13, 1957), also known as RoyEl, best known by his stage name Future Man (also written Futureman and known to fans as Futche), is an American musician, inventor and composer.

He is best known as a member of jazz and bluegrass quartet Béla Fleck and the Flecktones, along with banjoist Béla Fleck, harmonicist Howard Levy, and Roy's brother, bassist Victor Wooten. His primary instrument is the SynthAxeDrumitar, a guitar synthesizer he customized to play drum and percussion, but he sometimes plays a standard drum kit and other conventional percussion.

== Life and career ==
Born in Hampton, Virginia, Roy Wooten was raised in a military family and therefore traveled frequently. He is the second of five sons born to Dorothy and Elijah "Pete" Wooten. He graduated from Denbigh High School in Newport News, Virginia in 1975. He briefly attended music classes at Norfolk State University upon graduating from high school, and then embarked on his professional music career. He and his brothers moved to Nashville, Tennessee in the mid-1980s.

All of his brothers are musicians. The oldest, Regi, is a guitarist and teacher in Nashville. Roy Wooten, Regi, and his three younger brothers, Rudy (1959–2010) (saxophone), Joseph (keyboards), and Victor (bass guitar), performed as The Wooten Brothers in numerous musical venues in the Hampton Roads area of southeast Virginia during the 1970s.

Wooten is a five-time Grammy Award-winning performer with Béla Fleck and the Flecktones. For the Flecktones, he plays the Drumitar, a novel electronic instrument of his own invention, and occasionally performs vocals as well.

More recently, Wooten has developed a new electronic instrument called the RoyEl, which resembles a piano but plays notes not found in the traditional western music scales. This instrument is based on the periodic table of elements and the golden ratio.

In 2005, Wooten pleaded guilty to income tax evasion, after having been indicted on charges in 2001 that he had not filed or paid taxes between 1995 and 1998. He was affiliated with the Washitaw Nation, and before his guilty plea had been judged possibly incapable of assisting in his own defense after filing incomprehensible sovereign citizen paperwork with the court.

== Solo work ==
Like the other members of the Flecktones, Wooten has worked on various solo projects during his time off from the band. On his own Wooten often dresses up as a pirate and uses the pseudonym "RoyEl", also the name he gave to the keyboard instrument he invented. Wooten's solo albums are experimental and incorporate diverse musical genres and concepts. On Evolution de la Musique, for example, he infuses classical music with jazz elements, especially improvisation, and spoken word.

Among extra-musical influences, Wooten describes Pythagorean numerology and Vedic mathematics as influencing his compositions.

Wooten's solo works are:

- The Seamless Script
- Pi Lullaby
- Evolution de la Musique
- The Black Mozart Ensemble

== See also ==
- Afrofuturism
