= Palmystery =

palmystery

Studio album by Victor Wooten
- Released: April 1, 2008
- Recorded: 2004, 2007
- Genre: Jazz
- Length: 65:47
- Label: Heads Up

Victor Wooten chronology
Soul Circus (2005)	palmystery (2008)	Thunder (2008)

Professional ratings
Review scores
Source	Rating
Allmusic	link
PopMatters	link

palmystery is the sixth studio album from American Jazz bassist Victor Wooten.

== Track listing ==
1. "2 Timers" - (4:51)
2. "Cambo" - (5:25)
3. "I Saw God" - (4:20)
4. "The Lesson" - (5:55)
5. "Left, Right & Center" - (7:11)
6. "Sifu" - (7:36)
7. "Miss U" - (4:33)
8. "Flex" - (6:37)
9. "The Gospel" - (6:40)
10. "Song for My Father" - (5:18)
11. "Happy Song" - (4:23)
12. "Us 2" - (2:58)

== Personnel ==
- Victor Wooten – Bass guitar, Cora, Slide Bass, Fretless Bass, Hand Claps, Vocals, Production
- Derico Watson – Drums
- J.D. Blair – Drums
- Joseph Wooten – Keyboards, Piano, Organ, Vocals
- Rod McGaha – Trumpet
- Eric Silver – Violin, Mandolin
- Anthony Wellington – Bass
- Regi Wooten – Guitar, Bass
- Amir Ali – Violin, Lute, Darbouka, Vocals
- Saundra Williams – Vocals
- Steve Bailey – Fretless Bass
- Richard Bona – Percussion, Vocals
- Roy Wooten – Cajon, Shakers, Hand Claps
- Rudy Wooten – Alto Saxophone
- John Billings – Bass
- Raymond Massey – Drums
- Chuck Rainey – Vocals
- Dennis Chambers – Drums
- Will Kennedy – Drums
- Mike Stern – Guitar
- Neal Evans – Organ
- Shawn "Thunder" Wallace – Alto Saxophone
- Dane Bryant – Keyboards
- Darrell Tibbs – Percussion
- James Jackson – Congas
- Alvin “Lil’ Al” Cordy – Bass
- Earl “Big E” Walker – Drums
- Roosevelt “The Doctor” Collier – Pedal Steel Guitar
- Alvin Chea – Vocals
- Derrick Lee – Vocals
- Keith Lee – Vocals
- Adam Wooten – Vocals
- Holly Wooten – Vocals
- Kaila Wooten – Vocals
- Daniel Hunt – Vocals
- Sifu Brian Edwards – Vocals
- Alvin Lee – Guitar
- Keb' Mo' – Slide Guitar
- Barry Green – Trombone
- Dorothy Wooten – Vocals
- Doug Woodard – Vocals
- The Woodard Family – Vocals
- Howard Levy – Harmonica
- Jeff Coffin – Tenor Saxophone, Baritone Saxophone
- Karl Denson – Alto Saxophone
