= Yin-Yang (album) =

Studio album by Victor Wooten
- Released: June 22, 1999
- Genre: Jazz
- Length: 88:50
- Label: Compass
- Producer: Victor Wooten

Victor Wooten chronology
What Did He Say? (1997)	Yin-Yang (1999)	Live in America (2001)

Professional ratings
Review scores
Source	Rating
Allmusic	3/5 stars

Yin-Yang is the third album released by Victor Wooten.

The track "Pretty Little Lady" has a vocal line that was recorded backwards and then played in reverse, so that it appears to sound normal. This is an example of phonetic reversal.

There is a video of the recording of "Zenergy" and "Resolution" found on Victor Wooten and Carter Beauford "Making Music".

== Track listing ==
=== Disc one - instrumental ===
1. "Imagine This" (V. Wooten) – 5:08
2. "Yinin' & Yangin'" instrumental (V. Wooten) – 4:36
3. "Hip Bop" (V. Wooten) – 4:03
4. "Joe's Journey" (V. Wooten) – 5:20
5. "The Urban Turban" (V. Wooten) – 2:42
6. "Tali Lama" (V. Wooten) – 5:17
7. "Zenergy" (Béla Fleck, Carter Beauford, V. Wooten) – 6:46
8. "Kaila Speaks" (Future Man, V. Wooten) – 3:00
9. "Sacred Place" (V. Wooten) – 3:46
10. "Resolution" (Carter Beauford, V. Wooten) – 4:57

=== Disc two - instrumental and vocal ===
1. "Hormones in the Headphones" (Michael Kott) – 4:06
2. "Yinin' & Yangin'" vocal version (J.D. Blair, Dwight Farrell, Jonathan Morse, V. Wooten) – 4:12
3. "Kaila Raps" (V. Wooten) - 4:42
4. "One" (V. Wooten) – 4:54
5. "What Crime Is It?" (J.D. Blair, Bootsy Collins, William Collins II, V. Wooten) – 4:55
6. "Go Girl Go" (Michael Kott) – 3:18
7. "Pretty Little Lady" (V. Wooten) – 3:34
8. "Hero" (Future Man) – 4:42
9. "Singing My Song" (V. Wooten) – 4:43
10. "Think About That" (V. Wooten) – 4:09

== Personnel ==
- Victor Wooten - bass guitar, cello, programming, background vocals, acoustic bass, electric upright bass
- Steve Bailey - bass
- Carter Beauford - drums
- J.D. Blair - drums, vocals, drum programming
- David Blazer - cello
- Kathy Chiavola - vocals
- Jeff Coffin - tenor saxophone
- Bootsy Collins - vocals
- Billy Contreras - violin
- Count Bass D - rap
- Stuart Duncan - fiddle
- Tabitha Fair - vocals
- Béla Fleck - banjo
- Joseph Wooten - organ, piano, keyboards, theremin, background vocals
- Aseem Hetep - vocals
- Michael Kott - cello, background vocals
- Park Law - vocals
- Rod McGaha - trumpet
- Jonathan Morse - background vocals
- Jonell Mosser - vocals
- Jim Roberts - djembe, shaker
- Peter Rowan - vocals
- Buddy Spicher - violin, viola
- Kurt Storey - violin
- Allyson Taylor - vocals
- Kirk Whalum - soprano saxophone, tenor saxophone
- Roger "Rock" Williams - soprano saxophone
- Dorothy G. Wooten - vocals
- Holly Wooten - background vocals
- Kaila Wooten - vocals
- Regi Wooten - acoustic guitar, guitar, wah-wah guitar
- Rudy Wooten - saxophone
- Kelly Gravely - drums (Imagine This, Tali Llama, Pretty Little Lady)
