= Thunder (SMV album) =

Studio album by SMV
- Released: August 12, 2008
- Studio: Hannibal Studio (Santa Monica, CA); Threshold Sound + Vision (Santa Monica, CA); House of Blues Studios (Encino, CA); Westlake Recording Studios (Los Angeles, CA); VixMix (Nashville, TN); Topanga Studios (Topanga, CA); Le Gonks West (Los Angeles, CA)
- Genre: Jazz-funk
- Length: 1:02:33
- Label: Heads Up
- Producer: Marcus Miller; Stanley Clarke (co.); Victor Wooten (co.)

Stanley Clarke chronology
The Toys of Men (2007)	Thunder (2008)	Jazz in the Garden (2009)

Marcus Miller chronology
Marcus (2008)	Thunder (2008)	Renaissance (2012)

Victor Wooten chronology
Palmystery (2008)	Thunder (2008)	The Music Lesson (2011)

Professional ratings
Review scores
Source	Rating
AllMusic	4/5 stars
The Guardian	3/5 stars
All About Jazz	4.5/5 stars

Thunder is the debut studio album by supergroup S.M.V., consisted of bassists Stanley Clarke, Marcus Miller and Victor Wooten. It was released on August 12, 2008, via Heads Up International. Recording sessions took place at Hannibal Studio and Threshold Sound + Vision in Santa Monica, at House of Blues Studios in Encino, at Westlake Studios and Le Gonks West in Los Angeles, at VixMix Studios in Nashville, and at Ryan's Place in Topanga. The entire album was produced by Marcus Miller with co-production by Clarke and Wooten. It features contributions from Antoinette "Butterscotch" Clinton on vocals, George Duke, Ruslan Sirota, Ariel Mann, Chick Corea and Karlton Taylor on keyboards, Ronald Bruner Jr., Poogie Bell, Derico Watson and J. D. Blair on drums, Kevin Ricard on percussion, Michael "Patches" Stewart on trumpet, and Steve Baxter on trombone.

The album peaked at #186 on the Billboard 200 albums chart in the United States.

== Track listing ==
No.	Title	Writer(s)	Length
1.	"Maestros de Las Frecuencias Bajas"	Stanley Clarke	2:52
2.	"Thunder"	Marcus Miller	6:37
3.	"Hillbillies on a Quiet Afternoon"	Victor Wooten; Stanley Clarke	6:13
4.	"Mongoose Walk"	Victor Wooten; Marcus Miller; Stanley Clarke	5:59
5.	"Los Tres Hermanos"	Marcus Miller	5:25
6.	"Medley: Lopsy Lu/Silly Putty"	Stanley Clarke	6:14
7.	"Milano"	Marcus Miller	4:22
8.	"Classical Thump (Jam)"	Victor Wooten	4:50
9.	"Tutu"	Marcus Miller	5:05
10.	"Lil' Victa"	Stanley Clarke	4:13
11.	"Pendulum"	Stanley Clarke; Marcus Miller; Victor Wooten; Antoinette Clinton	4:18
12.	"Lemme Try Your Bass" (Interlude)	Stanley Clarke; Marcus Miller	0:59
13.	"Grits"	Marcus Miller	5:27
Total length:			1:02:33

== Personnel ==
SMV

- William Henry Marcus Miller Jr. – bass guitar, fretless bass (track 7), bass clarinet (tracks: 1, 9), alto & tenor saxophone (track 1), synthesizers (tracks: 2–7, 9, 11, 13), minimoog (track 4), drum programming (tracks: 2, 6, 9)
- Stanley Clarke – bass guitar (tracks: 1–6, 10–13), double bass (tracks: 7, 9)
- Victor Lemonte Wooten – bass guitar (tracks: 1–11, 13)

Additional musicians

- Antoinette Clinton – vocals (tracks: 2, 9), beatboxing (tracks: 2, 11)
- George Duke – clavinet (track 3), minimoog (track 6)
- Ruslan Sirota – keyboards (track 1)
- Ronald Bruner Jr. – drums (tracks: 1, 10, 13)
- Charles Bell Jr. – drums (tracks: 5–6)
- Kevin Ricard – percussion (tracks: 4–5, 7)
- Michael "Patches" Stewart – trumpet (tracks: 1, 6)
- Steve Baxter – trombone (tracks: 1, 6)
- Ariel Mann – synthesizer (track 1)
- Derico Watson – drums (track 3)
- Armando Anthony Corea – piano (track 4)
- Karlton Taylor – keyboards (track 9)
- J. D. Blair – drums (track 9)

Production

- Marcus Miller – producer, recording
- Stanley Clarke – co-producer
- Victor Wooten – co-producer, recording
- Gerry E. Brown – mixing & recording
- Dave Rideau – mixing
- David Isaac – mixing
- Goh Hotoda – mixing
- Peter A. Barker – additional recording
- Erik Zobler – additional recording
- Milton Gutiérrez Ruezga – assistant engineer
- Antonio Resendiz – assistant engineer
- Sharon Brencius – assistant engineer
- Ursula Arevalo – assistant engineer
- Scott Coslett – assistant engineer
- Todd Bergman – assistant engineer
- Doug Tyo – assistant engineer
- Robert C. Ludwig – mastering
- Steven Parke – art direction, design, photography
- Danette Albetta – management
- Bibi Green – management

== Chart history ==
Chart (2008)	Peak position
Dutch Albums (Album Top 100)	67
French Albums (SNEP)	105
US Billboard 200	186
US Independent Albums (Billboard)	28
US Heatseekers Albums (Billboard)	6
US Top Jazz Albums (Billboard)	3
