= Soul Circus =

Studio album by Victor Wooten
- Released: April 12, 2005
- Genre: Jazz
- Length: 60:20
- Label: Vanguard
- Producer: Victor Wooten

Victor Wooten chronology
Live in America (2001)	Soul Circus (2005)	Palmystery (2008)

Professional ratings
Review scores
Source	Rating
Allmusic	link

Soul Circus is the fifth album by Victor Wooten, released in 2005. Wooten claims he took inspiration from what played in radio stations in the 1970s, so most songs have lyrics to them.

== Track listing ==
1. "Intro: Adam" (V. Wooten) – 0:09
2. "Victa" (Bootsy Collins, Future Man, V. Wooten) – 4:54
3. "Bass Tribute" (Future Man, V. Wooten) – 5:11
4. "Prayer" (Divinity Roxx, Saundra Williams, V. Wooten) – 5:47
5. "Natives" (V. Wooten) – 4:00
6. "Can't Hide Love" (Skip Scarborough) – 4:36
7. "Stay" (V. Wooten) – 4:56
8. "On and On" (Speech, Saundra Williams, V. Wooten) – 4:52
9. "Cell Phone" (Count Bass D, Divinity Roxx, V. Wooten) – 4:22
10. "Back To India" (Speech, V. Wooten) – 4:31
11. "Soul Circus" (V. Wooten) – 4:29
12. "Higher Law" (V. Wooten) – 4:34
13. "Take U There" (V. Wooten) – 0:28
14. "Ari's Eyes" (V. Wooten) – 4:59
15. "Outro: Kids" (Kalia Wooten, Adam Wooten, Arianna Wooten) – 0:08
16. "Bass Tribute (Reprise)" (V. Wooten) – 2:24

== Personnel ==
- Victor Wooten - Bass guitar, Tenor bass, Drum Programming, Keys, Vocals, Background Vocals, Electronic drums, Sitar Bass, Double bass, Drums, Production
- Steve Bailey - bass, vocals, fretless bass, acoustic bass
- J.D. Blair - drums
- Oteil Burbridge - vocals
- Dennis Chambers - drums
- T.H. Subash Chandran - ghatam, konnakol, vocal percussion, jaw harp, moorsing
- Alvin Chea- vocals
- Jeff Coffin - saxophone
- Bootsy Collins - vocals
- Count Bass D - rap
- John Cowan - vocals
- Bill Dickens - vocals
- Future Man- keyboards, vocals, voices
- Gary Grainger - vocals
- Barry Green - trombone
- K. B. Ganesh Kumar - kanjira
- Keith Leblanc - vocals
- Will Lee - bass, vocals
- Howard Levy- harmonica
- Raymond Massey - drums, snare drum
- Christian McBride - vocals
- Rod McGaha - trumpet
- Bill Miller - flute, shaker, frame drum
- Rhonda Smith - vocals
- Speech - vocals, rap
- T. M. Stevens - bass, vocals
- Kurt Storey - bass, voices
- Shawn "Thunder" Wallace - saxophone
- Saundra Williams - vocals
- Holly Wooten- background vocals
- Kaila Wooten - vocals
- Regi Wooten - guitar, nylon-string guitar
- Roy Wooten - cajón, box
- Divinity Roxx - vocals/rap
