= Live in America (Victor Wooten album) =

Live album by Victor Wooten
- Released: 2001
- Genre: Jazz
- Label: Vanguard Records
- Producer: Victor Wooten

Victor Wooten chronology
Yin-Yang (1999)	Live in America (2001)	Soul Circus (2005)

Professional ratings
Review scores
Source	Rating
AllMusic	2/5 stars

Live in America is an album by Victor Wooten, released in 2001. The double disc contains highlights of the Yin-Yang tour.

== Track listing ==
=== Disc one ===
1. "Are You Ready, Baby?" – 2:24 w/Bootsy Collins
2. "What Did He Say?" – 6:54
3. "Hormones In The Headphones" – 6:46
4. "Nobody Knows My Name" – 4:50
5. "Hero" – 5:06
6. "Yinin' And Yangin'/Hey Girl" – 12:36
7. "Sacred Silence/The Jam Man" – 5:46
8. "Tappin' And Thumpin'/Born In The Dark/I Can't Make You Love Me" – 5:31
9. "James Brown!/Iron Man" – 7:46

=== Disc two ===
1. "Miller Time" – 10:41
2. "Good People" – 7:52
3. "Imagine This" – 8:39
4. "I Dream In Color" – 4:18
5. "My Life" – 4:18
6. "U Can't Hold No Groove..." – 5:24
7. "Me And My Bass Guitar" – 4:40
8. "Pretty Little Lady" – 4:37
9. "If You Want Me To Stay/Thank You (Fallentin Me Be Mice Elf Agin)" – 9:47

== Personnel ==
- Victor Wooten
- Regi Wooten
- J.D. Blair
- Bootsy Collins
- Marcus Miller
- Divinity Roxx
