= Eric Racy =

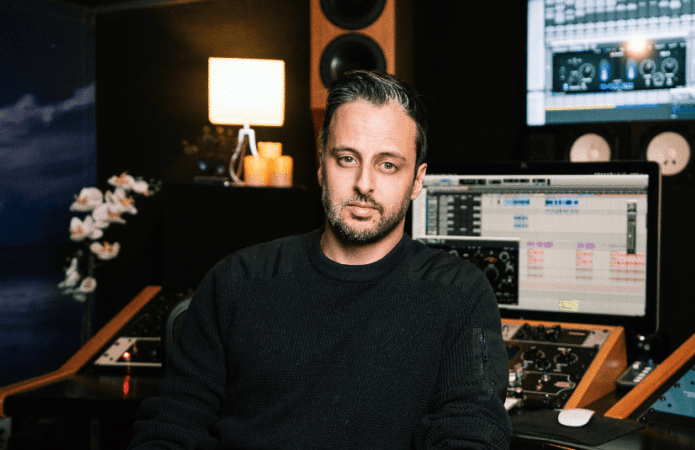

Background information
- Born: September 10, 1980 (age 45)
- Genres: Pop, Hip Hop, RnB, Rock, Drum & bass, Electronica
- Occupations: Mixer, Engineer, Producer
- Website: http://www.ericracy.com

Eric Racy (born 10 September 1980) is a platinum selling, mixer, engineer and producer.

Currently, he lives and works in LA in a wide range of genres and with clients ranging from indie bands to Grammy Winning pop artists. His clients have included Katy Perry, Nicki Minaj, Pharrell, Tyga, Jonathan Davis, 2NE1, Troye Sivan, Alessia Cara, Kelly Clarkson, Divinity Roxx, Kelly Rowland, J. Cole, Janelle Monáe, T-Pain, Missy Elliott, Zendaya, Lil Wayne, Big Sean, Busta Rhymes, Photek and many more.

== Career ==
=== Production & mixing ===
Eric started his career in the underground dance music scene in 1998, producing Drum and bass and eventually working alongside EDM legends like Loxy & Ink, Soul Slinger and Tech Itch. After releasing singles on Renegade Hardware and Liquid Sky he began to move away from drum and bass towards traditional engineering and turned his attention to working with artists and bands.

In 2008, Racy relocated to Los Angeles where he began focusing more heavily on mixing. In 2011, while working with the band Vayden, lead singer Curtis Casey introduced Racy to record producer Jess Jackson who was working on Tyga's major label debut album Careless World. Shortly after the meeting, Jackson brought Racy on to mix the project which went on to produce multiple Gold and Platinum singles. After Careless World, Racy's demand continued to increase both in the urban and pop genres leading him to work with and mix songs for artists including Troye Sivan, Alessia Cara, Divinity Roxx, Jonathan Davis, Photek, Major Myjah and many more.

In 2016, Eric was hired to mix the single "This is For My Girls", a charity single commissioned by First Lady Michelle Obama, featuring Kelly Clarkson, Kelly Rowland, Janelle Monáe, Missy Elliott, Zendaya, Jadagrace, Chloe & Halle and written by Diane Warren. Proceeds from the single benefits Michelle Obama's 'Let Girls Learn' initiative as well as the First Lady's #62MillionGirls campaign, targeted towards helping young ladies around the world complete their education.

=== 2ne1 'New Evolution' Global Tour & Katy Perry's 'Prismatic World Tour' ===
Shortly after the release of Careless World, Racy was asked to join YG Entertainment for the mega K Pop group 2NE1's first world tour. Alongside former members of Michael Jackson, Cee-Lo and Beyonce's camps, Eric traveled to Seoul to help program and create the audio and multimedia for the show. Racy traveled with the group as part of the band for the duration of the tour and also created a remix of 2ne1's hit "I am the best" that was used for the concert's finale. The remix appears on the 'Live in Japan' tour DVD.

In 2014, while back in the studio in LA, Racy was approached to join the Katy Perry "Prismatic" World Tour to help build and program the show as he had for 2ne1's 'New Evolution'. After spending several months creating the show in Los Angeles, Eric traveled with Katy and the tour for the first leg before heading back to the studio. The Prismatic World Tour which opened to critical acclaim continued throughout 2014/2015, becoming Perry's most successful tour to date.

In addition to his work as a mixer, Racy is also one half of "Black Box Analog Design", a boutique company that builds handmade tube, studio equipment.

=== Additional work ===
In 2025, Racy served as the mixing engineer on the song "Number 1 Fan" from the album Harmony, which won the Grammy Award for Best Children's Music Album at the 68th Annual Grammy Awards.

=== Selected Credits ===
Year	Title	Artist	Album	Credit
2012	Careless World	Tyga	Careless World: Rise Of The Last King	Mixer
2012	Celebration	Tyga feat. T-Pain	Careless World: Rise Of The Last King	Mixer
2012	Faded	Tyga feat. Lil Wayne	Careless World: Rise Of The Last King	Mixer
2012	I'm Gone	Tyga feat. Big Sean	Careless World: Rise Of The Last King	Mixer
2012	King & Queens	Tyga feat. Wale & Nas	Careless World: Rise Of The Last King	Engineer
2012	Lay You Down	Tyga feat. Lil Wayne	Careless World: Rise Of The Last King	Mixer
2012	Let It Show	Tyga feat. J. Cole	Careless World: Rise Of The Last King	Mixer
2012	Lil Homie	Tyga feat. Pharrell Williams	Careless World: Rise Of The Last King	Mixer
2012	Love Game	Tyga	Careless World: Rise Of The Last King	Mixer
2012	Muthafucka Up	Tyga feat. Nicki Minaj	Careless World: Rise Of The Last King	Mixer
2012	Potty Mouth	Tyga feat. Busta Rhymes	Careless World: Rise Of The Last King	Mixer
2012	This Is Like	Tyga feat. Robin Thicke	Careless World: Rise Of The Last King	Mixer
2012	Aviator	Photek	KU:PALM	Mixer
2012	Mistral	Photek	KU:PALM	Mixer
2012	Munich	Photek	KU:PALM	Mixer
2012	Oshun	Photek	KU:PALM	Mixer
2012	Pyramid	Photek	KU:PALM	Mixer
2012	Quadrant	Photek	KU:PALM	Mixer
2012	Quevedo	Photek	KU:PALM	Mixer
2012	Shape Charge	Photek	KU:PALM	Mixer
2012	Signals	Photek	KU:PALM	Mixer
2012	Snap	Divinity Roxx feat. Bootsy Collins	The Roxx Boxx Experience	Mixer
2012	Ghetto Rock	Divinity Roxx feat. Killa Mike	The Roxx Boxx Experience	Mixer
2012	Black Betty	Divinity Roxx	The Roxx Boxx Experience	Mixer
2013	T.K.O	Jonn Hart	Single	Mixer
2013	Errday	Goon Squad	TWERK	Mixer
2013	Poppin Pillz	Goon Squad feat. Trapzillas	TWERK	Mixer
2013	Trillizm	Goon Squad feat. Lex One	TWERK	Mixer
2013	Twerk	Goon Squad feat. Trapzillas	TWERK	Mixer
2014	20 Young	Cadence	Single	Mixer
2014	Want This	Dj Carisma feat. Cadence	Single	Mixer
2014	That's How We Feel	Jonn Hart feat. Glasses Malone	Heart 2 Hart 2	Mixer
2014	KTYS	Jonn Hart	Heart 2 Hart 2	Mixer
2014	So Good	Jonn Hart	Heart 2 Hart 2	Mixer
2014	Hell Yeah	Jonn Hart feat. DJ Rapture & MILLA	Single	Mixer
2015	Walk Away	Major Myjah	Trouble	Mixer
2015	Bu$$in Out Da Bag	Tyga feat. A.E.	Fuk Wat They Talkin Bout	Mixer
2015	Clarity	Tyga	Fuk Wat They Talkin Bout	Mixer
2015	Death Row Chain	Tyga	Fuk Wat They Talkin Bout	Mixer
2015	Don't C Me Comin	Tyga feat. A.E.	Fuk Wat They Talkin Bout	Mixer
2015	Glitta	Tyga	Fuk Wat They Talkin Bout	Mixer
2015	Rap $tar	Tyga	Fuk Wat They Talkin Bout	Mixer
2015	$timulated	Tyga	Fuk Wat They Talkin Bout	Mixer
2015	$uperwifey	Tyga	Fuk Wat They Talkin Bout	Mixer
2015	$candal	Tyga	Fuk Wat They Talkin Bout	Mixer
2015	Turban$	Tyga	Fuk Wat They Talkin Bout	Mixer
2015	Talk Sick	Orgy	Talk Sick EP	Mixer
2015	Come Back	Orgy	Talk Sick EP	Mixer
2015	G Face	Orgy	Talk Sick EP	Mixer
2015	Monster In Me	Orgy (feat. CulineR)	Talk Sick EP	Mixer
2016	Break Down These Walls	Divinity Roxx feat. Anhayla	ImPossible	Mixer
2016	Can It B SO Hard	Divinity Roxx feat. Victor Wooten	ImPossible	Mixer
2016	Hey U	Divinity Roxx feat. Daniel J. Watts	ImPossible	Mixer
2016	I Like It	Divinity Roxx feat. Yani Martin	ImPossible	Mixer
2016	Let You Go	Divinity Roxx	ImPossible	Mixer
2016	Just When You Think	Divinity Roxx feat. LD	ImPossible	Mixer
2016	Miracle	Divinity Roxx	ImPossible	Mixer
2016	Question	Divinity Roxx feat. Derrick Baskin	ImPossible	Mixer
2016	Stinger (So Real)	Divinity Roxx	ImPossible	Mixer
2016	The Book	Divinity Roxx	ImPossible	Mixer
2016	We Are	Divinity Roxx	ImPossible	Mixer
2016	WhachaDoiNWhereUATWhoUWit	Divinity Roxx feat. Derrick Baskin And Daniel J. Watts	ImPossible	Mixer
2016	This Is for My Girls	Kelly Clarkson, Kelly Rowland, Missy Elliott, Janelle Monáe, Chloe & Halle, Jadagrace, Lea Michelle and Zendaya	Single	Mixer
2016	WOFBT (Watch Out For Bear Traps)	Alter Ego x Trevor Ross	Single	Mixer
2016	Wild	Troye Sivan & Alessia Cara	Single	Mixer
2016	Ain't Got Money	New District	Single	Mixer
2016	Let Me Help You	Mario	Single	Mixer
2017	Pain is the new Pleasure	Mario	Single	Mixer
2017	Fall For You	Madysyn Rose	Single	Mixer
2017	Mind	AJ Mitchell	Single	Mixer
2018	Cars	Erika Jayne	Single	Mixer
2018	King For A Day	Matthew grant	Single	Mixer
2018	Friday	Carmen Reece	Single	Mixer
2018	MIA	Life of Dillon	Single	Mixer
2018	Clean Break	Dev	Single	Mixer
2018	Elisa Lam	Skynd	Chapter I EP	Mixer
2018	Gary Heidnik	Skynd featuring Jonathan Davis	Chapter I EP	Mixer
2018	Richard Ramirez	Skynd	Chapter I EP	Mixer
2019	Rattlesnake	Antonio Fresco x Patricia Possollo feat. Lorena J'zel	Single	Mixer
2019	Say It	Carmen Reece	Single	Mixer
2019	Jim Jones	Skynd	Chapter II EP	Mixer
2019	Tyler Hadley	Skynd	Chapter II EP	Mixer
2019	Katherine Knight	Skynd	Chapter II EP	Mixer
2020	James Woo Woo	Trinidad James	Single	Mixer
2020	Misunderstood	Xuitcasecity	Single	Mixer
2020	Black Filter	Trinidad James	Album	Mixer
2021	Human	India Carney	Single	Mixer
2021	For My Girls (Theme song for The View season 25)	Brandy Norwood and Nicole Scherzinger	Single	Mixer
2022	Finish Line	Rita Ora	Single	Mixer
