= The Toys of Men =

Studio album by Stanley Clarke
- Released: October 16, 2007
- Studio: The Boat (Silver Lake, Los Angeles, CA, US); Skyline Recording (Topanga, CA, US)
- Genre: Jazz fusion; jazz
- Length: 58:20
- Label: Heads Up
- Producer: Dave Love (exec.); Stanley Clarke

Stanley Clarke chronology
1, 2, to the Bass (2003)	The Toys of Men (2007)	Thunder (2008)

Professional ratings
Review scores
Source	Rating
All About Jazz	5/5 stars
AllMusic	4/5 stars

The Toys of Men is the 27th studio album by jazz fusion bassist Stanley Clarke. It was released on October 16, 2007, via Heads Up International.

== Track listing ==
All tracks composed by Stanley Clarke; except where noted. Tracks 4, 6, 10, 11 and 13 are solos by Stanley Clarke on acoustic bass.

1. "The Toys of Men" – 11:14
2. "Come On" (Ronald Bruner Jr., Stanley Clarke, Ruslan Sirota, Mads Tolling) – 2:59
3. "Jerusalem" (Ruslan Sirota) – 6:13
4. "Back in the Woods" – 1:24
5. "All Over Again" (Stanley Clarke, Esperanza Spalding) – 5:04
6. "Hmm Hmm" – 1:53
7. "Bad Asses" – 5:04
8. "Game" – 3:18
9. "La Cancion de Sofia" – 3:07
10. "El Bajo Negro" – 7:45
11. "Broski" – 1:56
12. "Châteauvallon 1972 (dedicated to Tony Williams)" – 5:25
13. "Bass Folk Song No. 6" – 2:52

== Personnel ==
Musicians

- Stanley Clarke – acoustic and electric bass, piccolo bass, tenor bass, spoken word
- Mads Tolling – violin (tracks 1–2, 9)
- Jef Lee Johnson – electric guitar (tracks 1–2, 8)
- Ruslan Sirota – piano (tracks 1, 9, 12), keyboards (tracks 1–3, 5)
- Ronald Bruner Jr. – drums (tracks 1–2, 5, 7–9, 12)
- Esperanza Spalding – vocals (tracks 1, 5)
- Tomer Shtein – acoustic guitar (track 1)
- Michael Landau – acoustic and electric guitar (track 3)
- Phil Davis – keyboards (track 8)
- Paulinho Da Costa – percussion (track 9)

Production

- Producer: Stanley Clarke
- Executive producer: Dave Love
- Recording engineers: Gerry "The Gov" Brown and Ed Thacker
- Mastering: Bernie Grundman
- Album design: Robert Hoffman
- Cover photo: Armando Carlos
