= What Did He Say? =

Studio album by Victor Wooten
- Released: August 19, 1997
- Genre: Jazz fusion
- Length: 62:37
- Label: Compass
- Producer: Victor Wooten, JD Blair, Kurt Storey

Victor Wooten chronology
A Show of Hands (1996)	What Did He Say? (1997)	Yin-Yang (1999)

Professional ratings
Review scores
Source	Rating
Allmusic	4/5 stars

What Did He Say? is the second solo album released by bassist Victor Wooten.

== Track listing ==
1. "Yo Victa" – 0:07

2. "What Did He Say?" – 3:20

- Victor Wooten - Bass, Lead and background vocals
- JD Blair - Drums, Background vocals
- Cherokee - Background vocals

3. "What You Won't Do for Love" – 4:43

- Victor Wooten - Bass
- JD Blair - Drums

4. "Cherokee" – 1:49

- Victor Wooten - Bass
- James Genus - Acoustic Bass
- Raymond Massey - Drums
- Futch - Swinging ride cymbal
- Regi Wooten - Guitar
- Joseph Wooten - Piano
- Rudy Wooten - Alto Sax
- Jeff Coffin - Tenor Sax
- Rod McGaha - Trumpet
- Cherokee - Vocals

5. "Don't Wanna Cry" – 5:07

- Victor Wooten - Bass, Vocals, Music Programming
- Ann McCrary & Robert Bailey - Background Vocals

6. "The Lonliest Monk" – 4:36

- Victor Wooten - Bass, Cello, Percussion, Vocals, Piano
- JD Blair - Drums

7. "A Chance" – 2:54

- Victor Wooten - Bass
- JD Blair - Drums, Drum programming, Bass

8. "Radio W-OO-10" – 1:06

- Michael Kott & Matt Smith - Vocals

9. "Norwegian Wood" – 4:52

- Victor Wooten - Bass

10. "Bro John" – 4:18

- Pete Wooten - Lead Vocals
- Victor Wooten - Bass, Background Vocals, Stomps and Claps
- JD Blair - Drums, Stomps and Claps
- Holly Wooten and Kurt storey - Stomps and Claps

11. "Naima" – 5:57

- Oteil Burbridge - Electric bass
- Regi Wooten - Nylon String Guitar
- JD Blair - Drums
- Jim Roberts - Percussion
- Victor Wooten - Acoustic Bass

12. "Sometimes I Laugh" – 3:20

- Victor Wooten - Bass
- Laughter provided by Jessie and Justice Wooten, Willow Robillard, Jason and Derek Weiman, David Shea, Josh Bartley, Nikki and Ben Curtis, Kari and Elii Morse, Sophie Bell, Baylane Hayens, Holly Wooten

13. "My Life" – 4:45

- Victor Wooten - Bass, Guitar, Lead and Background vocals
- JD Blair - Drums, Background vocals
- Kurt Storey - Background vocals

14. "The Sojourn of Arjuna" – 6:29

15. "Buzz Ntro" – 0:31

16. "A Little Buzz" – 2:46

17. "Kids Didn't Change" – 0:54

18. "Heaven Is Where the Heart Is" – 5:03

== Personnel ==
- Aashid – Vocals
- J.D. Blair – Drums
- Future Man – Vocals, Voices
- Michael Kott – Vocals, Voices
- Park Law – Vocals
- Will Lee – Vocals
- Malcolm X – Vocals, Voices
- Dorothy G. Wooten – Vocals, Voices
- Elijah "Pete" Wooten – Vocals, Voices
- Joe Wooten – Vocals
- Victor Wooten – Bass, Arranger, Vocals, Voices, Producer, Liner Notes, Tenor Bass

== Production ==
- David Bennett – Management
- Steve Lowery – Illustrations, Drawing
- Mark Mandelbaum – Engineer
- Chris Milfred – Mastering
- Griffin Norman – Design
- Keith Odle – Mixing
- Kurt Storey – Vocals, Engineer, Mastering, Mixing
- Mark Tucker – Photography
