= A Show of Hands (Victor Wooten album) =

Studio album by Victor Wooten
- Released: February 20, 1996
- Studio: Top of the Hill Recorders, Nashville, Tennessee
- Genre: Jazz
- Length: 44:56; 62:11 (15th Anniversary Edition)
- Label: Compass
- Producer: Victor Wooten

Victor Wooten chronology
A Show of Hands (1996)	What Did He Say? (1997)

A Show of Hands is the debut album by bassist Victor Wooten. It was recorded at Top of the Hill Studios in Nashville, Tennessee, and was released in 1996 by Compass Records. The album features bass guitar with only the accompaniment of vocals, and showcases Wooten's slap bass and signature open-hammer-pluck techniques. In 2011, Wooten reissued the album in remastered form, with three bonus tracks, on his Vix Records label.

== Reception ==
Professional ratings
Review scores
Source	Rating
AllMusic	3/5 stars

In a review for AllMusic, Bob Gottlieb wrote: "This is one of the most ambitious albums I have run across... This is an album from the heart of a thinking and feeling human, who has so much to give... Put it on and open up to the music."

Bill Milkowski of JazzTimes stated: "Few other bass players could summon up so much music from just four strings but Wooten pulls it off with a stunning bit of virtuosity, grace and nonchalance."

Writing for Innerviews, Anil Prasad commented: "the disc makes a strong case for the bass as a lead instrument. In fact, the album goes so far beyond conventional ideas about the instrument that listeners often forget they're hearing virtually nothing but bass."

== Track listing ==
"Overjoyed" was composed by Stevie Wonder. "Medley" combines "Someday My Prince Will Come" by Frank Churchill and Larry Morey, "Misty" by Erroll Garner, "A Night in Tunisia" by Dizzy Gillespie and Frank Paparelli, and "Vix Blues" by Victor Wooten. The remaining tracks were composed by Victor Wooten.

No.	Title	Length
1.	"U Can't Hold No Groove..."	4:08
2.	"More Love"	3:28
3.	"Lotta Stuffis?"	0:12
4.	"The Vision"	5:35
5.	"Overjoyed"	2:56
6.	"Live for Peace"	0:05
7.	"A Show of Hands"	5:27
8.	"Not Like the Other"	0:41
9.	"Justice"	4:01
10.	"Medley" ("Someday My Prince Will Come", "Misty", "A Night In Tunisia", "Vix Blues")	4:30
11.	"Radio W-OO-10"	0:27
12.	"Classical Thump"	4:38
13.	"Keep Chargin'"	0:25
14.	"Me & My Bass Guitar"	5:14
15.	"Words of Wisdom"	3:09

15th Anniversary Edition
No.	Title	Length
1.	""Yo Victa""	0:12
2.	"U Can't Hold No Groove..."	4:00
3.	"More Love"	3:31
4.	"Lotta Stuffis?"	0:14
5.	"The Vision"	5:37
6.	"Overjoyed"	2:58
7.	"Live for Peace"	0:06
8.	"A Show of Hands"	5:28
9.	"Not Like the Other"	0:41
10.	"Justice"	4:01
11.	"Medley"	4:31
12.	"Radio W-OO-10"	0:28
13.	"Classical Thump"	4:40
14.	"Keep Chargin'"	0:25
15.	"Me & My Bass Guitar"	5:18
16.	"Words of Wisdom"	3:09
17.	"U Can't Hold No Groove... (Enhanced Version)"	4:25
18.	"Flip Flop"	2:42
19.	"Live Solo #2"	12:25

== Personnel ==
- Victor Wooten – bass, vocals, voice
- JD Blair – vocals
- Cortney and Brittany Knight – vocals, voices
- Michael Saleem – vocals
- Mark "Zeke" Sellers – vocals
- Roy Wooten – vocals
- Joseph Wooten- vocals, voice
- Michael Kott – vocals, voice
- Elijah "Pete" Wooten – voice
- Park Law – vocals
- Kurt Story – vocals
- Martin Luther King Jr. – pre-recorded sample from a speech
- Malcolm X – pre-recorded sample from a speech
- Aashid – voice
- Dorothy G. Wooten – voice
