= Ruslan Sirota =

Ukrainian-born American musician

Background information
- Origin: Uman, Ukraine
- Genres: Jazz, R&B/soul, pop
- Occupations: Musician, producer, composer
- Instruments: Piano, keyboards, organ
- Years active: 1996–present

Ruslan Sirota is a Grammy Award winning pianist, composer, and producer.

== Early life ==
Ruslan was born in Uman, Ukraine to a Jewish family on November 4, 1980. His father, Yefim, who was an active local guitarist, introduced him to music at an early age. Picking up guitar around the age of four, Ruslan transitioned to piano around the age of seven. In 1990, his family moved to Israel, where he continued to study piano at the Bat-Yam music school. At approximately 14, Ruslan discovered jazz, instantly showing interest. By the age of 16, he was the "wunderkind" keyboardist for the then-popular Israeli jazz fusion band, "Confusion". With Confusion, he toured Israel and made several appearances at the Red Sea Jazz Festival.

At 18, Ruslan auditioned for the Berklee College of Music, where he received full tuition scholarship, and moved to Boston in January 2000. During his studies at Berklee, Ruslan displayed growing interest in R&B, funk and soul music, playing with local artists and eventually becoming the resident keyboardist in a club called "Wally's Jazz Café".

== Later life and career ==
Circa 2004, Ruslan joined the Stanley Clarke band and moved to Los Angeles, thus marking the beginning of his professional career.

Since then, Ruslan has been touring, performing and recording with artists such as Black Eyed Peas, Chick Corea, Kanye West, Kamasi Washington, Thundercat, Seal, Josh Groban, Ne-Yo, George Duke, Marcus Miller, Al Jarreau, Victor Wooten, Eric Benét, Rachelle Ferrell, Larry Carlton, Los Angeles Philharmonic and countless others. Ruslan released his self-titled debut album, featuring Clarke, Corea and George Duke as special guests, on October 24, 2011. The album was produced by Ruslan and Clarke, released on Bungalo Records and distributed by Universal Music Group Distribution.

Ruslan is also a board member of the Magic Music Foundation, a non-profit organization devoted to granting scholarships to music students worldwide, regardless of their choice of music teachers and/or schools.

== Discography ==
=== As leader ===
- 2023: Fruits of the Midi
- 2019: A Lifetime Away
- 2011: Ruslan

=== As sideman or guest ===
- 1998: Customade by Confusion
- 2007: The Toys of Men by Stanley Clarke
- 2008: Thunder by S.M.V.
- 2008: Conflict by Sy Smith
- 2009: The Quiet Hype by Jupiter Rising
- 2010: The Stanley Clarke Band by Stanley Clarke (also contributing the composition "Soldier")
- 2010: Lost in Time by Eric Benét
- 2011: Platinum Hit: The Winning Songs, Season One
- 2013: In This Life by Virgil Donati
- 2015: Stages by Josh Groban
- 2018: Quartet by Bob Reynolds
