= School Days (album) =

Studio album by Stanley Clarke
- Released: October 8, 1976
- Recorded: June 1976
- Studios: Electric Lady (New York City); A&M (Hollywood)
- Genres: Jazz fusion; jazz-funk
- Length: 37:18
- Labels: Nemperor; Epic
- Producers: Stanley Clarke; Ken Scott

Stanley Clarke chronology
| Journey to Love (1975) | School Days (1976) | Modern Man (1978) |

School Days is the fourth solo album by jazz fusion bassist Stanley Clarke, released in 1976. The album reached number 34 on the Billboard 200 chart and number 2 on the Jazz Albums chart.

== Unreleased quadraphonic version ==
In his book Abbey Road to Ziggy Stardust, record producer Ken Scott explains that the album was intended for release in 4-channel quadraphonic sound in 1976. However, at the last minute the record company decided to release only a standard 2-channel stereo version instead. This required Scott to create a "fold down" version from the 4-track mixes for the stereo release. The original quadraphonic version may still exist in the record company vault, but it has never been issued.

== Critical reception ==
Professional ratings
Review scores
| Source | Rating |
|---|---|
| AllMusic | 4.5/5 stars |
| The Encyclopedia of Popular Music | 2/5 stars |
| The Rolling Stone Album Guide | 1.5/5 stars |
| The Rolling Stone Jazz Record Guide | 3/5 stars |

Dave Thompson, in Funk, called the album a "masterful set dominated by its eight-minute title track."

== Track listing ==
All tracks composed by Stanley Clarke.

Side one

1. "School Days" – 7:51
2. "Quiet Afternoon" – 5:09
3. "The Dancer" – 5:27

Side two

1. "Desert Song" – 6:56
2. "Hot Fun" – 2:55
3. "Life Is Just a Game" – 9:00

== Personnel ==
- Stanley Clarke – electric bass guitar (1, 3, 5, 6), vocals (1, 6), handbells (1), acoustic piano (2, 3), piccolo bass guitar (2, 3, 6), humming (3), acoustic bass (4, 6), gong (6), chimes (6), arranger, conductor, producer
- George Duke – keyboards (6)
- Ray Gomez – electric guitar (1, 3, 5), rhythm guitar (3)
- Icarus Johnson – acoustic guitar (6), electric guitar (6)
- John McLaughlin – acoustic guitar (4)
- David Sancious – keyboards (1), Minimoog (2, 3), organ (3), electric guitar (5)
- Gerry Brown – drums (1, 3), handbells (1)
- Billy Cobham – drums (6), Moog 1500 (6)
- Steve Gadd – drums (2, 5)
- Milt Holland – percussion (3), conga (4), triangle (4)
- Tom Malone, Dave Taylor – trombone
- Jon Faddis, Alan Rubin, Lew Soloff – trumpet
- Earl Chapin, John Clark, Peter Gordon, Wilmer Wise – horns
- Al Aarons, Stewart Blumberg, George Bohanon, Buddy Childers, Robert Findley, Gary Grant, Lew McCreary, Jack Nimitz, William Peterson, Dalton Smith – brass, woodwinds
- Marilyn Baker, Thomas Buffum, David Campbell, Rollice Dale, Robert Dubow, Janice Gower, Karen Jones, Dennis Karmazyn, Gordon Marron, Lya Stern, Ron Strauss, Marcia Van Dyke, John Wittenberg – strings

Production

- Lynn Dreese Breslin – art direction
- Bob Defrin – art direction
- Ken Scott – producer, engineer, remixing
- Jerry Solomon – assistant engineer
- Ed Thacker – assistant engineer
- Michael Frondelli – assistant engineer
