= Jazz in the Garden =

Studio album by The Stanley Clarke Trio with Hiromi and Lenny White
- Released: April 15, 2009
- Recorded: December 13–14, 2008
- Studio: Mad Hatter Studios (Los Angeles, California)
- Genre: Jazz
- Length: 61:13
- Label: Heads Up
- Producer: Stanley Clarke; Dave Love

Stanley Clarke chronology
Thunder (2008)	Jazz in the Garden (2009)	The Stanley Clarke Band (2010)

Professional ratings
Review scores
Source	Rating
AllMusic	4.5/5 stars
All About Jazz	4.5/5 stars

Jazz in the Garden is the debut release from the Stanley Clarke Trio, featuring pianist Hiromi and drummer Lenny White. It was released in 2009 on CD and vinyl. The album consists mainly of cover songs, but also includes new compositions by both Clarke and Hiromi, and one improv piece.

== Track listing ==
1. "Paradigm Shift (Election Day 2008)" (Clarke) (7:42)
2. "Sakura Sakura" (Traditional) (5:30)
3. "Sicilian Blue" (Hiromi Uehara) (4:48)
4. "Take the Coltrane" (Duke Ellington) (3:29)
5. "3 Wrong Notes" (Clarke) (5:46)
6. "Someday My Prince Will Come" (Frank Churchill, Larry Morey) (4:52)
7. "Isotope" (Joe Henderson) (5:27)
8. "Bass Folk Song No. 5 & 6" (Clarke) (4:01)
9. "Global Tweak" (Clarke, Hiromi Uehara) (3:42)
10. "Solar" (Miles Davis) (5:12)
11. "Brain Training" (Hiromi Uehara) (4:52)
12. "Under the Bridge" (Michael Balzary, Anthony Kiedis, Chad Smith, John Frusciante) (5:30)

== Personnel ==
Stanley Clarke Trio

- Stanley Clarke - double bass
- Hiromi Uehara - piano
- Lenny White - drums
