= Children of Forever =

Studio album by Stanley Clarke
- Released: 1973
- Recorded: December 26–27, 1972
- Studio: A&R, New York City
- Genre: Jazz fusion
- Length: 47:52
- Label: Polydor
- Producer: Chick Corea

Stanley Clarke chronology
Children of Forever (1973)	Stanley Clarke (1974)

Children of Forever is the debut album by jazz fusion bassist Stanley Clarke. It was recorded in December 1972, and was released in 1973 by Polydor Records. On the album, Clarke is joined by vocalists Dee Dee Bridgewater and Andy Bey, flutist Arthur Webb, guitarist Pat Martino, keyboardist Chick Corea, and drummer Lenny White.

== Reception ==
Professional ratings
Review scores
Source	Rating
AllMusic	4.5/5 stars
The Rolling Stone Jazz Record Guide	4/5 stars

In a review for AllMusic, Thom Jurek wrote: "Children of Forever has aged exceedingly well, and sounds as warm, inviting, and full of possibility in the early 21st century as it did in the early '70s. It's full of heart, soul, passion, and truly inspired musicianship."

Billboard included the recording in their "Top Album Picks," and a reviewer stated: "Avant-garde meets funk on this connecting bridge type of project in which Andy Bey's fine voice is heard to advantage and Chick Corea's electric piano tinkles superbly."

== Track listing ==
All tracks composed by Stanley Clarke and lyrics written by Neville Potter, except where indicated

Side one

1. "Children of Forever" – 10:42
2. "Unexpected Days" – 5:53
3. "Bass Folk Song" (Clarke) – 7:59

Side two

1. "Butterfly Dreams" – 6:52
2. "Sea Journey" (Chick Corea, Neville Potter)– 16:26

== Personnel ==
- Stanley Clarke – double bass, bass guitar
- Chick Corea – electric piano, piano, clavinet
- Pat Martino – electric guitar, 12-string guitar
- Lenny White – drums, tambourine
- Arthur Webb – flute
- Dee Dee Bridgewater – vocals
- Andy Bey – vocals

Production

- Chick Corea – Producer
- Leslie Wynn – Assistant Producer
- Dixon Van Winkle – Engineer
- Brad Davis – Assistant Engineer
