= Stanley Clarke (album) =

Studio album by Stanley Clarke
- Released: December 1974
- Studio: Electric Lady, New York City
- Genre: Jazz fusion; jazz-funk
- Length: 40:31
- Label: Nemperor, Atlantic (original); Epic (reissue)
- Producer: Stanley Clarke

Stanley Clarke chronology
Children of Forever (1973)	Stanley Clarke (1974)	Journey to Love (1975)

Professional ratings
Review scores
Source	Rating
AllMusic	4/5 stars
The Rolling Stone Jazz Record Guide	4/5 stars
DownBeat	5/5 stars

Stanley Clarke is the second solo album by jazz fusion bassist Stanley Clarke. The opening track "Vulcan Princess" is a remake of "Vulcan Worlds", the opening track on Return to Forever's Where Have I Known You Before released earlier that year.

== Track listing ==
All tracks composed by Stanley Clarke, except where indicated.

Side one

1. "Vulcan Princess" – 4:00
2. "Yesterday Princess" (Clarke, Carolyn Clarke) – 1:41
3. "Lopsy Lu" – 7:03
4. "Power" – 7:20

Side two

1. "Spanish Phases for Strings & Bass" (Michael Gibbs) – 6:26
2. "Life Suite" – 13:47
  1. Part I – 1:51
  2. Part II – 4:12
  3. Part III – 1:03
  4. Part IV – 6:41

== Personnel ==
- Stanley Clarke – bass guitar, double bass, guitar, piano, vocals
- Jan Hammer – keyboards
- Bill Connors – guitar
- Tony Williams – drums
- Airto Moreira – percussion on "Life Suite"
- David Taylor – trombone, brasses
- Jon Faddis, James Buffington, Lew Soloff, Garnett Brown, Peter Gordon – brass
- David Nadien, Charles McCracken, Jesse Levy, Carol Buck, Beverly Lauridsen, Harry Cykman, Harold Kohon, Paul Gershman, Harry Lookofsky, Emanuel Green – string section
- Michael Gibbs – string & brass arrangement

Production

- Stanley Clarke – producer
- Ken Scott – engineer
- Brian Gardner – mastering engineer
- Dave Whitman – assistant engineer
