= The Stanley Clarke Band =

2010 studio album by the Stanley Clarke Band

Studio album by the Stanley Clarke Band featuring Hiromi
- Released: June 15, 2010
- Studio: Resonate Music (Burbank, CA); Topanga Studio (Topanga, CA)
- Genre: Jazz
- Length: 63:26
- Label: Heads Up
- Producer: Stanley Clarke; Lenny White

Stanley Clarke chronology
Jazz in the Garden (2009)	The Stanley Clarke Band (2010)	Up (2014)

The Stanley Clarke Band is an album by the Stanley Clarke Band led by jazz bassist Stanley Clarke. It was released by Heads Up Record in June 2010 and was produced by Clarke and Lenny White. Band members include Ruslan Sirota on keyboard, Ronald Bruner, Jr. on drums and featured performer Hiromi on piano.

The album was awarded the 2011 Grammy for Best Contemporary Jazz Album and the track "No Mystery" was nominated for Best Pop Instrumental Performance. The Guardian gave the album three stars, calling it a "return to a funk repertoire reminiscent of Clarke's roots in Chick Corea electric bands", while AllMusic gave it a score of three-and-a-half stars. It is also the second Stanley Clarke album to be credited to the Stanley Clarke Band after his 1985 album Find Out!.

== The band ==
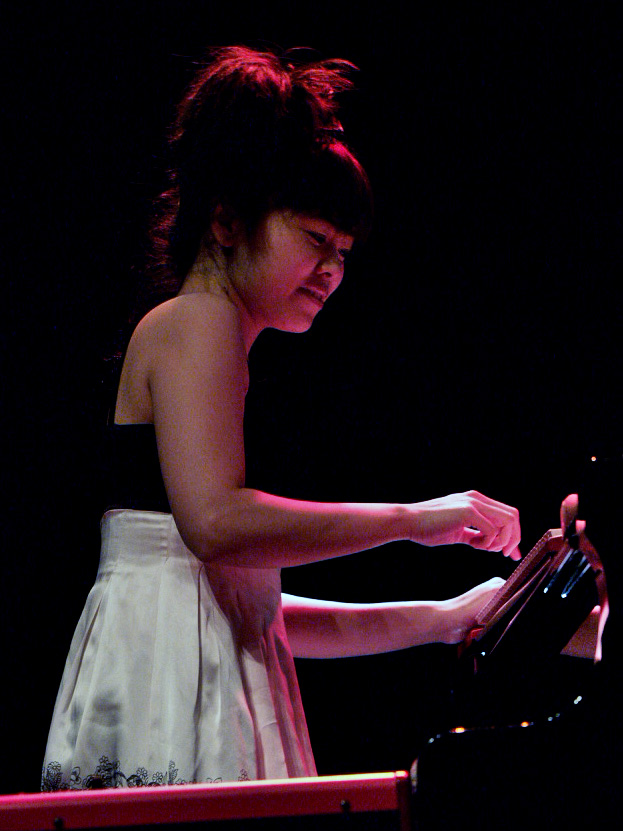
Featured performer Hiromi appears on three tracks and composed "Labyrinth"

A core trio is constant throughout the album with Clarke joined by drummer Ronald Bruner, Jr. and keyboardist Ruslan Sirota. Hiromi is billed as a featured artist playing piano on "No Mystery", "Larry Has Traveled 11 Miles and Waited a Lifetime for the Return of Vishnu’s Report" and her composition "Labyrinth". Several additional musicians appear on most tracks.

Clarke, in discussing the band has said that "our common thread is improvisation". Keyboardist Ruslan Sirota is from Israel; Clarke has compared him to Chick Corea and George Duke. Pianist Hiromi is from Japan; Clarke has said that she "plays the piano like a tornado". Hiromi also played on Clarke's 2009 album Jazz in the Garden. Clarke referred to drummer Ronald Bruner, from Compton, California, as "one of the most important drummers out there". Bruner and Sirota had been playing with Clarke for five years or so before the album's release.

The additional musicians include two guitarists Charles Altura and Rob Bacon, bassist Armand Sabal-Lecco on "Fulani", keyboardist Felton Pilate on "Here's Why Tears Dry", saxophonists Bob Sheppard on "Larry Has Traveled 11 Miles and Waited a Lifetime for the Return of Vishnu’s Report". Lorenzo Dunn from Earth, Wind & Fire plays the bass synthesizer on "Soldier". "Sonny Rollins" features Manhattan Transfer vocalist Cheryl Bentyne and a full horn section with Sheppard sharing saxophone duties with Doug Webb, plus trumpeter John Papenbrook and trombonist Andrew Lippman. Natasha Agrama and Ilsey Juber provide vocals on "Soldier".

== Music ==
In describing the album, Clarke said, "Technically, it's a Stanley Clarke record, but it's very much a band-oriented record at the same time". Comparing the album to a ship, he said, "I'd be the one steering the ship and keeping everybody on course. But all hands were definitely on deck, and everyone played an important role in getting us to our destination". Clarke has said that this will be his last electric album for a while. Clarke co-produced the album with Lenny White who played drums on Clarke's 2009 album Jazz in the Garden.

== Tracks ==
"Soldier", Ruslan Sirota's compositional contribution to the album, includes a piano solo with elements borrowed from McCoy Tyner and Herbie Hancock. It was called "Methenyesque" by music critic John Fordham. The track "Fulani" was written by Armand Sabal-Lecco and is "Africa-inspired" and "has a crunching rock feel".

Talking about the track "Here's Why Tears Dry" Clarke said, "The tune came about when a family member was ending a long-time love affair. There were a lot of tears, so I came up with that song. The tears evaporate into thin air, and the pain eventually goes away." "I Wanna Play for You Too" was written by Felton Pilate who plays keyboards on the track.

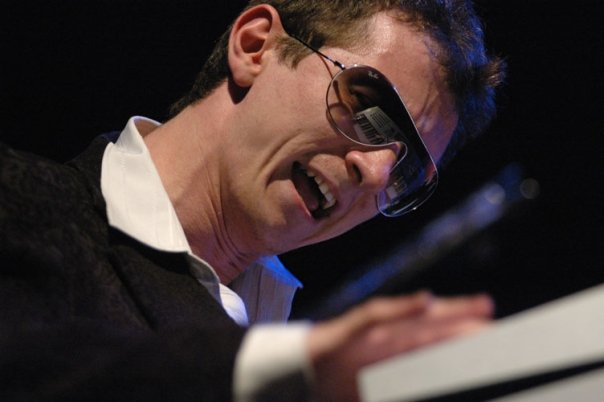
Keyboardist Ruslan Sirota composed the track "Soldier"

"Bass Folk Song No. 10" and the album's closing track, "Bass Folk Song No. 6" are both bass solo performances that Clarke wrote many years before they were recorded here. "No Mystery" is a reworking of the song written by Chick Corea when he and Clarke were bandmates in Return to Forever.

"How Is the Weather Up There?" was written by Clarke and Ronald Bruner, Jr., and deals with global warming. The song was built around comments left by his fans in response to a post on Clarke's Facebook page asking for thoughts on global warming.

"Larry Has Traveled 11 Miles and Waited a Lifetime for the Return of Vishnu’s Report" pays homage in its name and musical stylings to Larry Coryell's the Eleventh House, Miles Davis, Mahavishnu Orchestra, the Tony Williams Lifetime, Return to Forever, and Weather Report, all jazz fusion pioneers.

"Labyrinth" was composed by Hiromi and contains elements from "My Favorite Things" with a "funky touch". "Sonny Rollins" is a Caribbean flavored tribute to saxophonist Sonny Rollins featuring Bob Sheppard on tenor sax and vocals by Cheryl Bentyne.

== Reception ==
The Stanley Clarke Band
Review scores
Source	Rating
AllMusic	3.5/5 stars
The Guardian	3/5 stars

John Fordham of The Guardian called the album a "return to a funk repertoire reminiscent of Clarke's roots in Chick Corea electric bands". He goes on to call it "more than just a box-ticking piece of jazz-funk commercialism" but laments "Clarke could probably play a lot of this kind of thing in his sleep". William R. Wood wrote in the Kalamazoo Gazette that "Clarke’s complex bass work is invigorating as he blends jazz, rock and funk".

Thom Jurek of AllMusic wrote that the album "feels more like a band record than anything [Clarke has] done in decades". He praises Clarke's choice in bandmates, calling them "prodigies in their own right" but does not praise the whole album. He called "Larry Has Traveled 11 Miles and Waited a Lifetime for the Return of Vishnu's Report" a "clumsy, failed attempt at summing up the music's history to date" and that "Bass Folk Song No. 6" does not "work [as] well" as some of the other tracks but "these are minor complaints on an otherwise fine recording". Jeff Winbush of All About Jazz commented that there "are no radical departures" on this album and it sounds as if Clarke is "taking a victory lap here, revisiting past triumphs" but that he "still pull[s] sounds out of his assortment of electric, acoustic and Alembic basses like nobody else, and [is] still slapping, plucking and thumbing his way through contemporary, fusion jazz, rock, funk and whatever else he puts his mind to".

== Awards ==
I'm grateful on behalf of the whole band for this honor. It's humbling to be in such strong company. It's so gratifying to see that jazz and instrumental music remain such vibrant and exciting musical forms, and that we could contribute to their vitality. I'd like to thank the members of the Stanley Clarke Band: keyboardist Ruslan Sirota; drummer Ronald Bruner, Jr.; pianist Hiromi Uehara and the rest of the performers on this album. I'd also like to thank my wife Sofi, who's been such a strong supporter of my career, and my children, who are also making their paths in the arts.

— Clarke after learning he won the Grammy.

The album won the 2011 Grammy Award for Best Contemporary Jazz Album and the track "No Mystery" was nominated for Best Pop Instrumental Performance. Clarke accepted his Grammy with his bandmates Ronald Bruner, Jr. and Ruslan Sirota and his wife, Sofi, at the Staples Center during a pre-telecast ceremony. Clarke was on tour in Australia with Return to Forever when he learned of his nominations.

The other nominees for Best Contemporary Jazz Album were Never Can Say Goodbye by Joey DeFrancesco, Now Is the Time by Jeff Lorber Fusion, To the One by John McLaughlin, and Backatown by Trombone Shorty. The Best Pop Instrumental Performance was awarded to Jeff Beck for his rendition of "Nessun dorma".

== Track listing ==
All tracks written by Stanley Clarke unless noted

1. "Soldier" (Ruslan Sirota) 7:07
2. "Fulani" (Armand Sabal-Lecco) 6:29
3. "Here's Why Tears Dry" 4:52
4. "I Wanna Play for You Too" (Felton C. Pilate II) 4:13
5. "Bass Folk Song No. 10" 3:40
6. "No Mystery" (Chick Corea) 7:09
7. "How Is the Weather Up There?" (Ronald Bruner, Jr., Clarke) 5:54
8. "Larry Has Traveled 11 Miles and Waited a Lifetime for the Return of Vishnu’s Report" 6:32
9. "Labyrinth" (Hiromi) 5:56
10. "Sonny Rollins" 8:49
11. "Bass Folk Song No. 6 (Mo Anam Cara)" 2:41

== Personnel ==
Stanley Clarke Band

- Stanley Clarke – acoustic bass, electric bass, producer, vocals
- Ronald Bruner, Jr. – drums
- Ruslan Sirota – piano, keyboards

with:

- Hiromi – piano

Additional musicians

- Rob Bacon – guitar
- Charles Altura – guitar
- Bob Sheppard – saxophone
- Natasha Agrama – vocals, art direction
- Cheryl Bentyne – vocals
- Chris Clarke – drum programming
- Lorenzo Dunn – bass synthesizer
- John Papenbrook – trumpet
- Ilsey Juber – vocals
- Andrew Lippman – trombone
- Felton C. Pilate II – keyboards
- Armand Sabal-Lecco – bass
- Doug Webb – saxophone

=== Production ===
- Lenny White – producer
- Gerry "the Gov" Brown – engineer, producer
- Dennis MacKay – engineer
- Eddy Schreyer – mastering
- Jonathan Hakakian – engineer, electronic production, assistant engineer, drum programming
- Simon Kumar – assistant engineer
- Natalie Singer – product manager
- Christian Soza – production coordination
- Steve Parke – package design, photos of Stanley Clarke
- Mike Lanfear – band photo

== Chart performance ==
Year	Chart	Peak position
2010	Billboard Jazz Albums	7
