= Divinity Roxx =

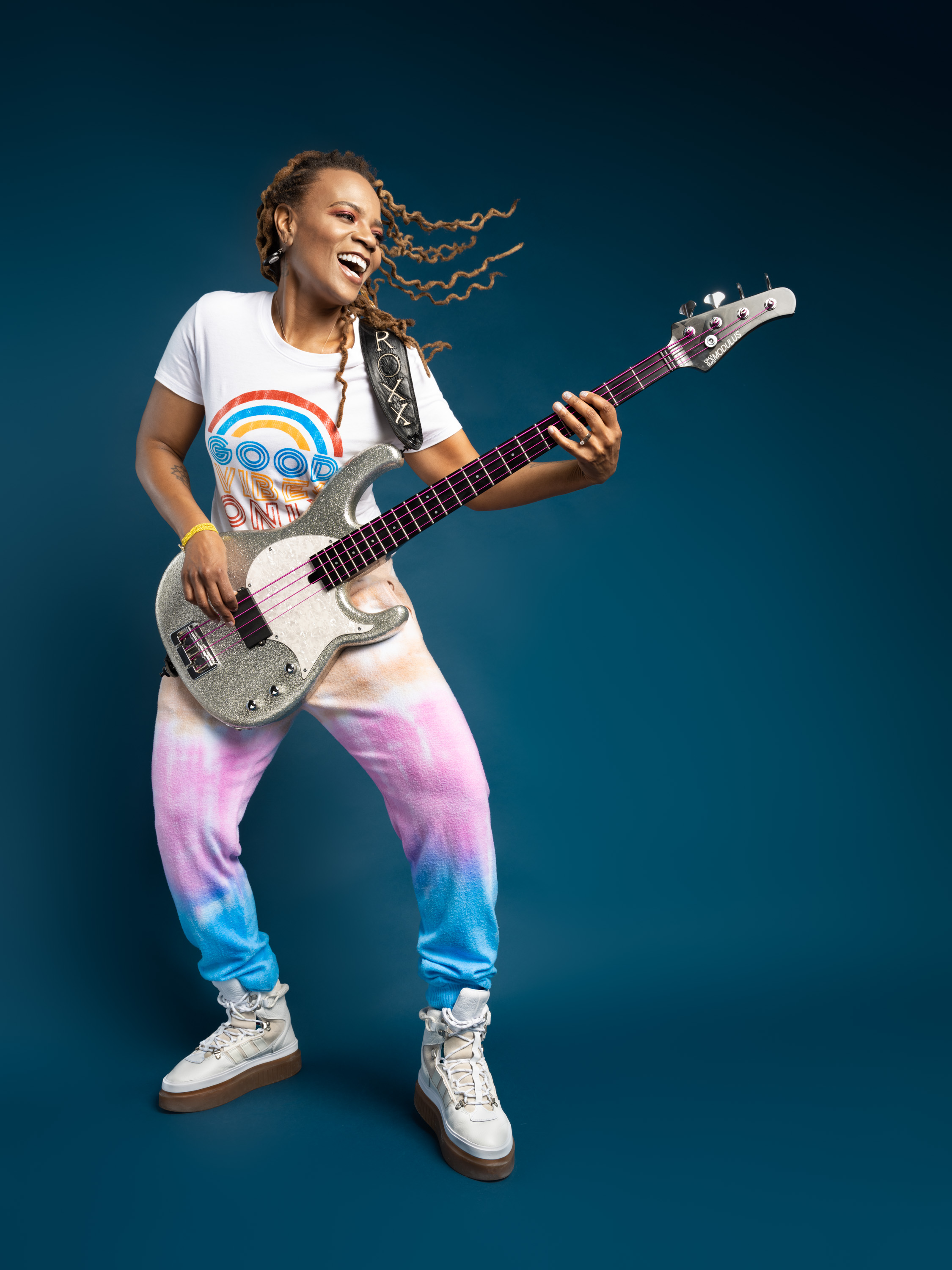
- Divinity Roxx 2020 Promo Photo for Divi Roxx Kids by Jay Denes

Background information
- Also known as: MC Divinity, D. Walker, Debbie Walker, Divi Roxx kids
- Born: February 5
- Origin: Atlanta, Georgia, U.S.
- Genres: Rap rock, soul, hip hop, funk, rock, children's music
- Occupations: Musician (bass), entertainer, rapper, singer, producer, performer, composer, musical director, author, entrepreneur
- Instrument: Bass guitar
- Years active: 1993–present
- Label: iRoxx Entertainment
- Spouse: Yanira Marin (m. 2019)
- Website: www.divinityroxx.com

Divinity Roxx (born Debbie Walker; 1976) is an American musician and author.

Divinity's work includes elements of funk, rock, and hip-hop. She has released five solo albums on her record label, IRoxx Entertainment (Ain’t No Other Way – 2003, The Roxx Boxx Experience – 2012, ImPossible – 2016, Ready Set Go! – 2021, World Wide Playdate – 2024). Both of her children's music albums were nominated for Grammy Awards.

She was introduced to the bass world by five-time Grammy Award-winning bassist Victor Wooten with her debut appearance on his Live in America album (2001). She also appeared on his albums Soul Circus and Words and Tones.

== Biography ==
She was born Debbie Walker to parents Beverly Walker and Raymond Walker Jr. in Atlanta, Georgia. She legally changed her name to Divinity Roxx in 2006.

Divinity founded a hip-hop group in high school called DATBU (Divinity and the Breakfast Unit) alongside her friends Corey Peyton (Kornbred), Chad Browning (Clever Love), Kamal Studdard (Cheezy Feets), and Lewis Miller (Pogo). The group eventually morphed into a trio, Divinity, Clever, and Pogo. They released an independent album, FoolProof, in 1997. Produced by DJ Kemit.

In October 2000, Divinity attended Victor Wooten's Bass Nature Camp at Montgomery Bell State Park near Nashville, Tennessee. There she met Victor Wooten and his brothers Regi, Joseph, Roy, and Rudy. Once the camp was over, Victor asked Divinity to tour with him. She began touring with Wooten's band, where she was a featured part of the show from 2000 to 2005. She is recorded on Wooten's Live in America (2001) and Soul Circus (2005) albums under the names D. Walker and MC Divinity.

She toured and performed with Beyoncé Knowles (2006–2011) as her bassist and musical director for "The Beyoncé Experience" and "I Am... World Tour". On the "I Am...Sasha Fierce" World tour, Divinity also helped compose music. She has appeared in three DVDs with Beyoncé including The Beyoncé Experience Live, I Am... Sasha Fierce, and I Am... Yours. She has also appeared in two videos, "Irreplaceable" and "Green Light". Divinity has performed with Beyoncé at the White House for President Barack Obama and Michelle Obama during a state dinner for the president of Mexico, Felipe Calderon. She also performed with Beyoncé during her Glastonbury performance.

She has also performed on the Grammys, the BET Awards, MTV Music Awards, Ellen, The Oprah Winfrey Show, Saturday Night Live, Good Morning America, The Today Show and countless other television shows with Beyoncé. In 2014, Divinity played bass on The Arsenio Hall Show and The Queen Latifah Show with Atlanta-born rapper B.o.B. Divinity has also appeared on Big Morning Buzz Live With Nick Lechey and The Wendy Williams Show with singer [K.Michelle]. She also appears on Victor Wooten's album Words and Tones (2012).

== Works ==
=== Solo recordings ===
==== Ain’t No Other Way (2003) ====
Divinity's first solo album, Ain't No Other Way, was self-released in 2012 while touring with Victor Wooten. The album featured production from will.i.am, DJ Lethal, and Mike Elizondo.

==== The Roxx Boxx Experience (2012) ====
Divinity's second EP, The Roxx Boxx Experience, was released in October 2012. The album featured Divinity Roxx (bass, lead vocals), Matt McMoots (guitar, backing vocals, backing bass), Omar Gusmao (guitar, backing vocals), and Carlos McSwain (drums, backing vocals). The album was mixed by Eric Racy and mastered by Chris Gehringer for Sterling Sound.

==== ImPossible (2016) ====
Divinity released ImPossible April 19, 2016. This is album features elements of funk, soul, rock, hip-hop and jazz.

==== Ready Set Go! ====
Divinity released Ready Set Go! on November 5, 2021. This was her first children's music album that featured elements of hip-hop, and positivity.

Ready Set Go! was nominated for a 65th Grammy® Award for Best Children's Music Album.

==== World Wide Playdate (2024) ====
Divinity released World Wide Playdate on August 9, 2024. The album was the follow-up to her debut children's music album. The album features production by Wayne Gerard (Dr. Fink, Don Was) and hit songwriter Mary Brown, who co-wrote, vocal-produced, and sang background vocals on the album. The album also features Divinity's longtime mentor and friend Victor Wooten, Malcom Jamal Warner, MuMu Fresh, Tank 'Tarrionna" Ball, Teemanay, and The Genesis Innovation Academy Cheer Squad, as well as her niece and goddaughter.

World Wide Playdate was nominated for a 67th Grammy® Award for Best Children's Music Album.

=== Television and film compositions ===
Divinity composed, performed, and co-produced the theme song for the Emmy-nominated PBS Kids show Lyla in the Loop, which premiered on PBS Kids Television on February 5, 2024. The show was created by Dave Peth.

Divinity appeared in the HBO Films Documentary 'Happy and You Know It' Directed by Penny Lane

=== Theater compositions ===
Divinity and longtime friend and collaborator Eugene Russell IV co-wrote the music for The Boy Who Kissed the Sky book by Idris Goodwin. The show was a co-production between The Alliance Theatre (Atlanta) and The Seattle Children's Theater.

Divinity composed the original song "Fresh Greens" for the Alliance Theatre production of Into the Burrow: A Peter Rabbit Story. The work follows the characters of Peter Rabbit's world as they gather for a surprise party. They quickly realize that Mr. McGregor, who owns the garden above the rabbit's den, has terrible plans for the surrounding land. The tale encourages audiences to acknowledge fears and work together to overcome challenges.

== Television appearances ==
Divinity appeared on the television show The Soul Man alongside the musical guest B.o.B. while playing bass on his Promo Tour for the album Underground Luxury.

Divinity was the bass player in the house band for the BET-produced television show Black Girls Rock! (2014–2016), backing such artists as Erykah Badu, Patti LaBelle, Gladys Knight, Brandy, Monica, Jazmine Sullivan, and more.

== Discography ==
- Victor Wooten - Words and Tones ("Get it Right", "Say Word", "Heaven") (2012)
- 2NE1 - 2NE1 GLOBAL TOUR NEW EVOLUTION IN SEOUL! DVD (2012)
- 2NE1 - GLOBAL TOUR NEW EVOLUTION IN SEOUL! Live CD (Dec 4, 2012)
- will.i.am – Songs About Girls ("She's a Star") (2007)
- NX Zero – A Melhor Parte De Mim 0.2 (2010)
- Beyoncé Knowles – The Beyoncé Experience Live (2007)
- Beyoncé Knowles – I Am... Sasha Fierce (2010)
- Beyoncé Knowles – Live in Vegas Instrumentals (2010)
- Beyoncé Knowles – Irreplaceable Live at Glastonbury (2011)
- Essence Music Festival, Vol 4: The Collection (Live) ("Single Ladies") (2011)
- Victor Wooten – Live in America (2001)
- Victor Wooten - Soul Circus (2005)
- Béla Fleck and the Flecktones – Little Worlds ("The Ballad of Jed Clampett") (2003)
- Divinity Roxx – Ain't No Other Way (2003)
- Divinity Roxx - The Roxx Boxx Experience (2012)
- Divinity Roxx - ImPossible (2016)
- Divinity Roxx - Ready Set Go! (2021)
- Madame Gandhi - Crystals and Congas (2022)
- Aiza - Sovereignty ("Rosé") (2023)
- Divinity Roxx - Lyla in the Loop Theme (2024)
- Divinity Roxx - Lyla in the Loop Extended Theme (2024)
- Divinity Roxx - World Wide Playdate (2024)
