= Modern Man (album) =

Studio album by Stanley Clarke
- Released: 1978
- Studios: Electric Lady (New York City); Chateau Recorders and Group IV Recorders, Hollywood; A&M (Los Angeles)
- Genres: Jazz fusion; jazz-funk
- Length: 37:18
- Label: Nemperor
- Producer: Stanley Clarke

Stanley Clarke chronology
School Days (1976)	Modern Man (1978)	I Wanna Play for You (1979)

Professional ratings
Review scores
Source	Rating
AllMusic	2/5 stars

Modern Man is the fifth album by jazz fusion bassist Stanley Clarke.

"Dayride" from the Return to Forever album No Mystery (1975) was re-recorded for this album. Also included was "More Hot Fun", a sequel to "Hot Fun" from the previous album School Days.

== Track listing ==
All tracks composed by Stanley Clarke, except where noted.

Side one

No.	Title	Music	Length
1.	"Opening (Statement)"		4:22
2.	"He Lives On (Story About the Last Journey of a Warrior)"		4:24
3.	"More Hot Fun"		4:31
4.	"Slow Dance"		3:16
5.	"Interlude: A Serious Occasion"		0:21
6.	"Got to Find My Own Place"	Clarke, Michael Garson, Raymond Gomez, Gerry Brown	3:17
Total length:			20:11

Side two

No.	Title	Length
1.	"Dayride"	4:09
2.	"Interlude: It's What She Didn't Say"	1:25
3.	"Modern Man"	3:32
4.	"Interlude: A Relaxed Occasion"	1:25
5.	"Rock 'n Roll Jelly"	5:09
6.	"Closing (Statement)"	2:36
Total length:		18:09

== Personnel ==
- Stanley Clarke – double bass, bass guitar, piccolo bass, piano, guitar, vocals
- Mike Garson – piano, organ, synthesizer, moog
- Jeff Beck – guitar on "Rock 'n Roll Jelly"
- Raymond Gomez – guitar
- Jeff "Skunk" Baxter – guitar, pedal steel guitar, guitar synthesizer on "He Lives On"
- Carmine Appice – drums on "Rock 'n Roll Jelly"
- Jeff Porcaro – drums, percussion
- Gerry Brown – drums, percussion
- Steve Gadd – cymbal
- Dale Devoe – trombone
- Al Harrison, James Tinsley – piccolo trumpet, trumpet, flügelhorn
- Bobby Malach – tenor saxophone, flute
- Alfie Williams – soprano saxophone, baritone saxophone, flute
- Rollice Dale, Mark Kovacs, Leonard Selic, Barbara Thomason – viola
- Ron Cooper, Jan Kelly, Niles Oliver, Harry Shultz – cello
- Ronald Clark, Frank Foster, Cynthia Kovacs, Connie Kupka, Debra Price, Alice Sachs, Steve Scharf, Josef Schoenbrun, Sandy Seymour, Marsha Van Dyke, Kenneth Yerke – violin
- Charles Veal Jr. – concertmaster, violin
- Dee Dee Bridgewater, Julia Waters, Maxine Waters – vocals

Production

- Stanley Clarke – producer, arranger
- Ed Thacker – engineer
- Art Bechtel, Brian Leshon, Christopher Gregg, Gary J. Coppola, Michael Frondelli, Paul Aronoff – assistant engineer
- Norman Seeff – photography
- Ed Lee – cover design
