= Experience and Judgment =

Studio album by Andy Bey
- Released: 1974
- Recorded: July 26 and September 19, 1973
- Studio: Regent Sound Studios, New York City
- Genre: Soul-funk, jazz
- Length: 41:43
- Label: Atlantic
- Producer: William S. Fischer

Andy Bey chronology
'Round Midnight (1965)	Experience and Judgment (1974)	As Time Goes By (1991)

Experience and Judgment is an album by vocalist and pianist Andy Bey recorded in 1973 and released on the Atlantic label.

== Reception ==
Professional ratings
Review scores
Source	Rating
AllMusic	4/5 stars

AllMusic awarded the album 4 stars, with its review by Rob Theakston stating: "It's soul soothing music that's been played with great reverence by the rare soul and funk community for years and rightly so, as Bey captures the essence of the soul world brilliantly, and fuses it into something that is uniquely his own".

== Track listing ==
Information based on the album's liner notes. All compositions by Andy Bey except as indicated.

1. "Celestial Blues" – 3:24
2. "Experience" – 2:57
3. "Judgment" – 2:58
4. "I Know This Love Can't Be Wrong" (Pat Evans, Bill Fischer) – 4:22
5. "Hibiscus" – 4:39
6. "You Should've Seen the Way" (Evans, Fischer) – 2:31
7. "Tune Up" – 4:11
8. "Rosemary Blue" (Howard Greenfield, Neil Sedaka) – 3:24
9. "Being Uptight" – 3:05
10. "A Place Where Love Is" (Evans, Fischer) – 4:38
11. "Trust Us to Find the Way" (Fischer) – 2:39
12. "The Power of My Mind" (Evans, Fischer) – 2:55

== Personnel ==
Information based on the Atlantic Records Jazz Disco Archives and the album's Liner Notes.

- Andy Bey – vocals (all tracks), acoustic piano (2–3, 8–9)
- Wilbur Bascomb – electric bass (all tracks)
- Selwart Clarke – violin, viola (1, 4–7, 10–12)
- George Davis – additional guitar (all tracks), guitar solo (4, 7, 9)
- Bill Fischer – percussion (all tracks), electric piano, organ, harpsichord, synthesizer (1, 4–7, 10–12), additional keyboards (2–3, 8–9)
- Richard Resnicoff – guitar solo (3), additional guitar (2–3, 8–9)
- Buddy Williams – drums (1, 4–7, 10–12)
- Jimmy Young – drums (2–3, 8–9)
