= Andy Bey =

American jazz singer and pianist (1939–2025)

Background information
- Born: Andrew Wideman Bey Jr. October 28, 1939; Newark, New Jersey, U.S.
- Died: April 26, 2025 (aged 85) Englewood, New Jersey, U.S.
- Genres: Jazz; soul-funk
- Occupation: Musician
- Instruments: Vocals; piano
- Years active: 1964–2025
- Labels: Prestige; Columbia; Evidence; Atlantic; Savoy Jazz; HighNote

Andrew Wideman Bey Jr. (October 28, 1939 – April 26, 2025) was an American jazz singer and pianist. Bey had a wide vocal range, with a four-octave baritone voice.

Raised in Newark, New Jersey, Bey attended Newark Arts High School.

== Background ==
Andrew Wideman Bey Jr. was born on October 28, 1939, in Newark. His father, a window washer born Andrew Wideman, was an adherent of the Moorish Science Temple of America, an offshoot of Islam, and followed its practice of adopting Bey as a surname. His son kept the surname but did not share his father's faith.

His mother, Victoria (Johnson) Wideman, raised Andy and his eight older siblings.

Bey was openly gay. In 1994, he was diagnosed as HIV-positive, but continued his career, maintaining a lifestyle that included yoga and a vegetarian diet. Producer Herb Jordan supported Bey in the resurgence of his recording career, and their 1996 recording Ballads, Blues & Bey returned Bey to prominence.

Bey was a longtime-resident of Chelsea, Manhattan. He died in Englewood, New Jersey on April 26, 2025, at the age of 85.

== Career ==
He worked on the 1959/1960 television show Startime with Connie Francis, and sang for Louis Jordan. At age 17, he formed a trio with his siblings Salome Bey and Geraldine Bey (de Haas) called Andy and the Bey Sisters. The trio went on a 16-month tour of Europe. The jazz trumpeter Chet Baker's 1988 documentary Let's Get Lost includes footage of Bey and his sisters delighting a Parisian audience. The trio recorded three albums (one for RCA Victor in 1961 and two for Prestige in 1964 and 1965) before breaking up in 1967. Bey also worked with Horace Silver and Gary Bartz.

In 1973, Bey and Dee Dee Bridgewater were the featured vocalists on Stanley Clarke's album Children of Forever. Later, Bey recorded the album Experience and Judgment (1974), which was influenced by Indian music. He then returned to hard bop, and recorded covers of music by non-jazz musicians, such as Nick Drake.

In 1976, Bey performed in a theatre production of Adrienne Kennedy's A Rat's Mass directed by Cecil Taylor at La MaMa Experimental Theatre Club in the East Village of Manhattan. Musicians Rashid Bakr, Jimmy Lyons, Karen Borca, David S. Ware, and Raphe Malik also performed in the production. Taylor's production combined the original script with a chorus of orchestrated voices used as instruments.

Bey's other albums include Ballads, Blues & Bey (1996), Tuesdays in Chinatown (2001), American Song (2004) and Ain't Necessarily So (2007). He received the "2003 Jazz Vocalist of the Year" award by the Jazz Journalists Association. His album American Song received a Grammy nomination for Best Jazz Vocal Album in 2005.

== Awards and honors ==
- 2003: Jazz Vocalist of the Year, Jazz Journalists Association
- 2005: Grammy nomination, Best Jazz Vocal Album for American Song
- 2014: NPR Music Jazz Critics Poll, Best Vocal Album for Pages from an Imaginary Life

== Discography ==
- 1974: Experience and Judgment (Atlantic)
- 1991: As Time Goes By (Jazzette)
- 1996: Ballads, Blues & Bey (Evidence)
- 1998: Shades of Bey (Evidence)
- 2001: Tuesdays in Chinatown (N-Coded)
- 2003: Chillin' with Andy Bey (Minor Music)
- 2004: American Song (Savoy Jazz)
- 2007: Ain't Necessarily So (12th Street)
- 2013: The World According to Andy Bey (HighNote)
- 2014: Pages from an Imaginary Life (HighNote)

With Andy and the Bey Sisters

- 1961: Andy and the Bey Sisters (RCA Victor )
- 1964: Now! Hear! (Prestige) with Jerome Richardson, Kenny Burrell
- 1965: 'Round Midnight (Prestige) with Kenny Burrell, Milt Hinton, Osie Johnson

With Gary Bartz

- 1971: Harlem Bush Music − Taifa (Milestone)
- 1971: Harlem Bush Music − Uhuru (Milestone)
- 1972: Juju Street Songs (Prestige)
- 1973: Follow, the Medicine Man (Prestige)

With Stanley Clarke

- 1973: Children of Forever (Polydor)

With Gerry Eastman

- 1995: Songbook (Williamsburgh Music Center)

With Howard McGhee Orchestra

- 1966: Cookin' Time (Zim)

With Bob Malach

- 1995: The Searcher (Go Jazz)

With Grachan Moncur III

- 1977 Shadows (Denon)

With Mtume Umoja Ensemble

- 1972: Alkebu-Lan: Land of the Blacks (Live at the East)

With Duke Pearson

- 1969: How Insensitive (Blue Note)

With Max Roach

- 1968: Members, Don't Git Weary (Atlantic)

With Horace Silver

- 1970: That Healin' Feelin': The United States Of Mind / Phase 1
- 1988: Music to Ease Your Disease (Silveto)
- 1993: It's Got to Be Funky (Columbia)
- 1996: Total Response (Blue Note)
