= Journey to Love (album) =

Studio album by Stanley Clarke
- Released: 1975
- Studio: Electric Lady, New York City
- Genre: Jazz fusion; jazz-funk
- Length: 39:21
- Label: Nemperor
- Producer: Stanley Clarke; Ken Scott

Stanley Clarke chronology
Stanley Clarke (1974)	Journey to Love (1975)	School Days (1976)

Professional ratings
Review scores
Source	Rating
AllMusic	4.5/5 stars
The Rolling Stone Jazz Record Guide	3/5 stars

Journey to Love is the third solo album by jazz fusion bassist Stanley Clarke.

== Track listing ==
All tracks composed by Stanley Clarke, except where indicated.

No.	Title	Music	Length
1.	"Silly Putty"		4:52*
2.	"Journey to Love"	Clarke (lyrics: Stevie Geltman, Jill Steinberg)	4:52
3.	"Hello Jeff"		5:16
4.	"Song to John, Part 1"	Clarke, Chick Corea	4:22
5.	"Song to John, Part 2"	Clarke, Corea	6:09
6.	"Concerto for Jazz/Rock Orchestra, Parts 1-4"		14:25
Total length:			39:56

(* The first few seconds of "Silly Putty" are missing from all CD releases of the album.)

== Personnel ==
- Stanley Clarke – bass guitar, double bass, organ, piccolo bass, bells, gong, vocals
- Chick Corea – piano on "Song to John"
- George Duke – keyboards, bells, vocals
- Jeff Beck – electric guitar on "Hello Jeff" and guitar solo on "Journey to Love"
- John McLaughlin – acoustic guitar on "Song to John"
- David Sancious – electric guitar, 12–string guitar
- Jon Faddis – trumpet
- Alan Rubin – trumpet
- Lew Soloff – trumpet
- Tom Malone – trombone
- David Taylor – trombone
- Earl Chapin – brass horn
- John Clark – brass horn
- Peter Gordon – brass horn
- Wilmer Wise – brass horn
- Steve Gadd – drums, percussion
- Lenny White – drums on "Hello Jeff"
