= ImPossible =

Studio album by Divinity Roxx
- Released: April 19, 2016
- Recorded: 2015–16
- Studio: Mood Recording, Nyak NY
- Genres: Soul, hip hop, pop
- Length: 0:39:00
- Label: iRoxx Entertainment, LLC
- Producers: Divinity Roxx (exec.), Yani Marin (also exec.), Arc Danger, Reggie Rock, Chris Pinset

ImPossible is the third studio album from American recording artist and bass player Divinity Roxx. The album was nominated for two Independent Music Awards for Best Spoken Word Album with musical accompaniment and Best Artwork/Photography. The album is a depart from Roxx's previous work as it features more jazzy basslines, dub, and funk rather than the rock/hip-hop Roxx has come to be known for.

The album starts off with a voicemail message from Divinity's mother where she expresses that she really hopes "this year is definitely your year to make it in your business", after which she encourages Divinity to "always expect a miracle."
