= SMV (band) =

Bass guitar supergroup (2008–2009)

- On stage at Stockholm Jazz Festival 2009

Background information
- Genres: Jazz; jazz-funk; funk
- Years active: 2008–2009
- Label: Heads Up International
- Members: Stanley Clarke; Marcus Miller; Victor Wooten

SMV was a bass guitar supergroup formed in 2008. The group's name comes from the first initials of each of its members—Stanley Clarke, Marcus Miller, and Victor Wooten.

The collaboration gained momentum when the three first played together at a concert held by Bass Player magazine in New York City in 2006, where Miller and Wooten joined on stage to present Clarke with the magazine's Lifetime Achievement Award.

SMV's debut album, Thunder, was released on August 12, 2008, with a supporting world tour beginning the same month.

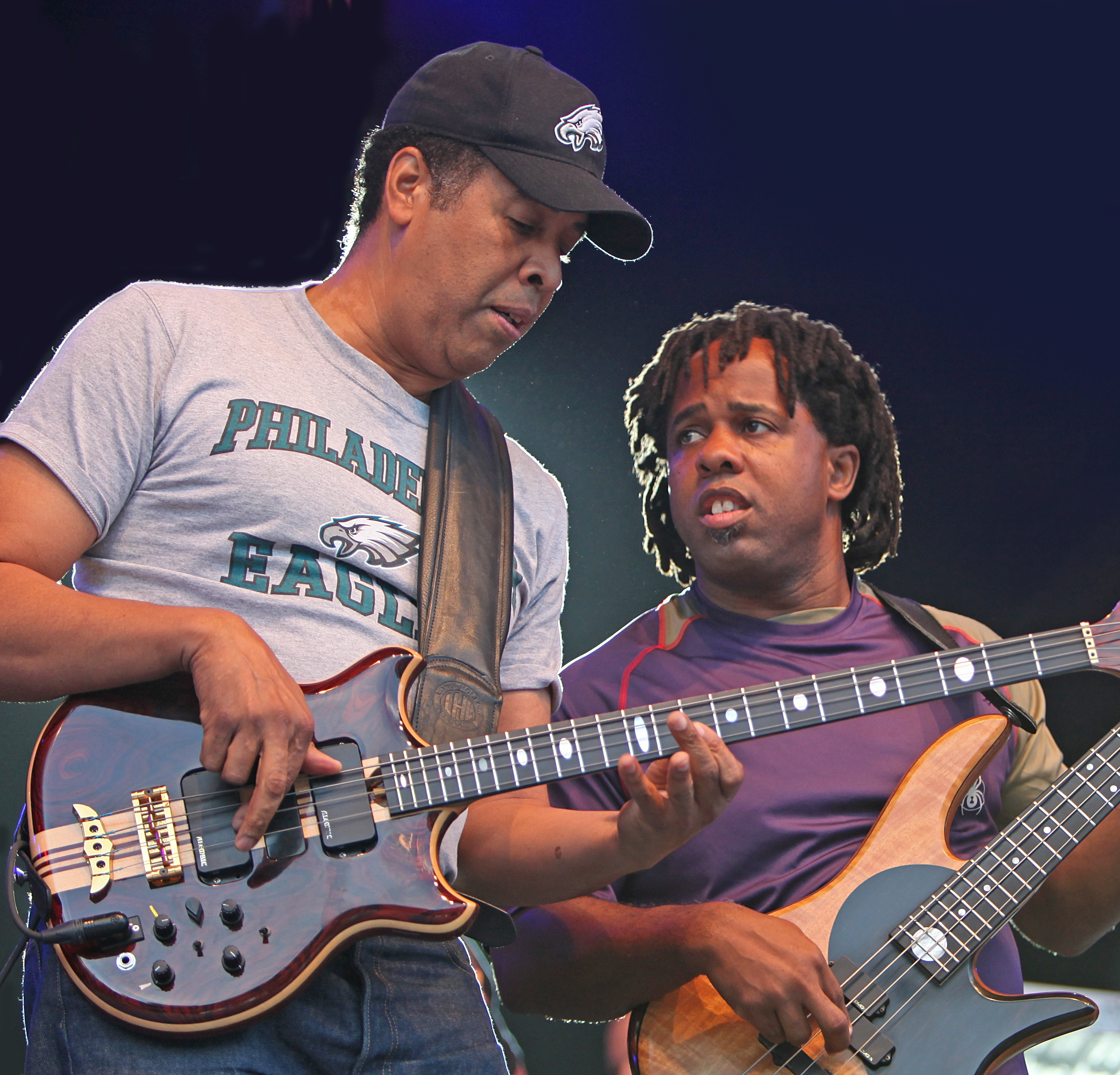
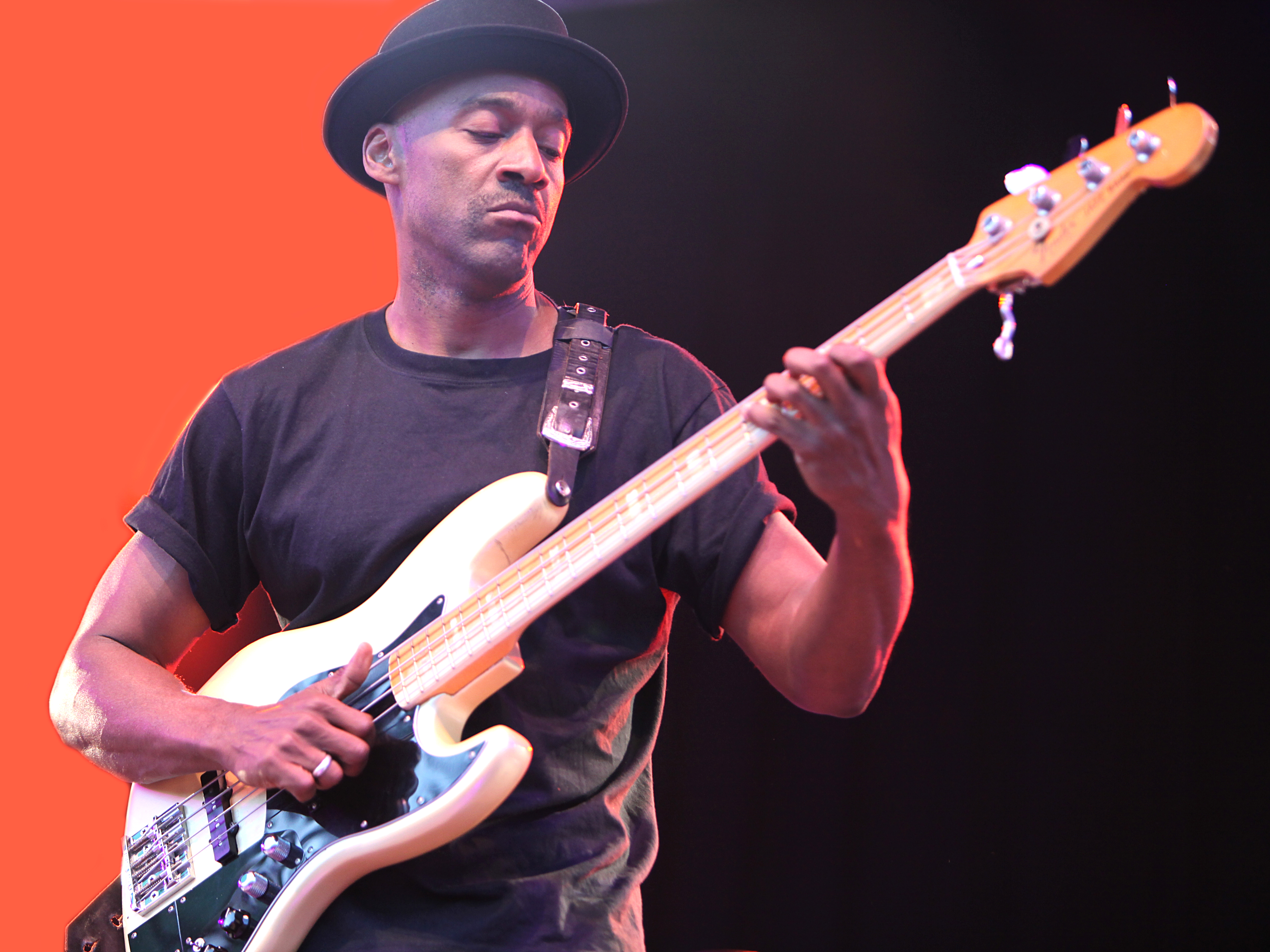
Stanley Clarke and Victor Wooten (left) and Marcus Miller (right) at the Stockholm Jazz Festival in 2009
