= Antonio Fresco =

American DJ, music producer, and radio personality

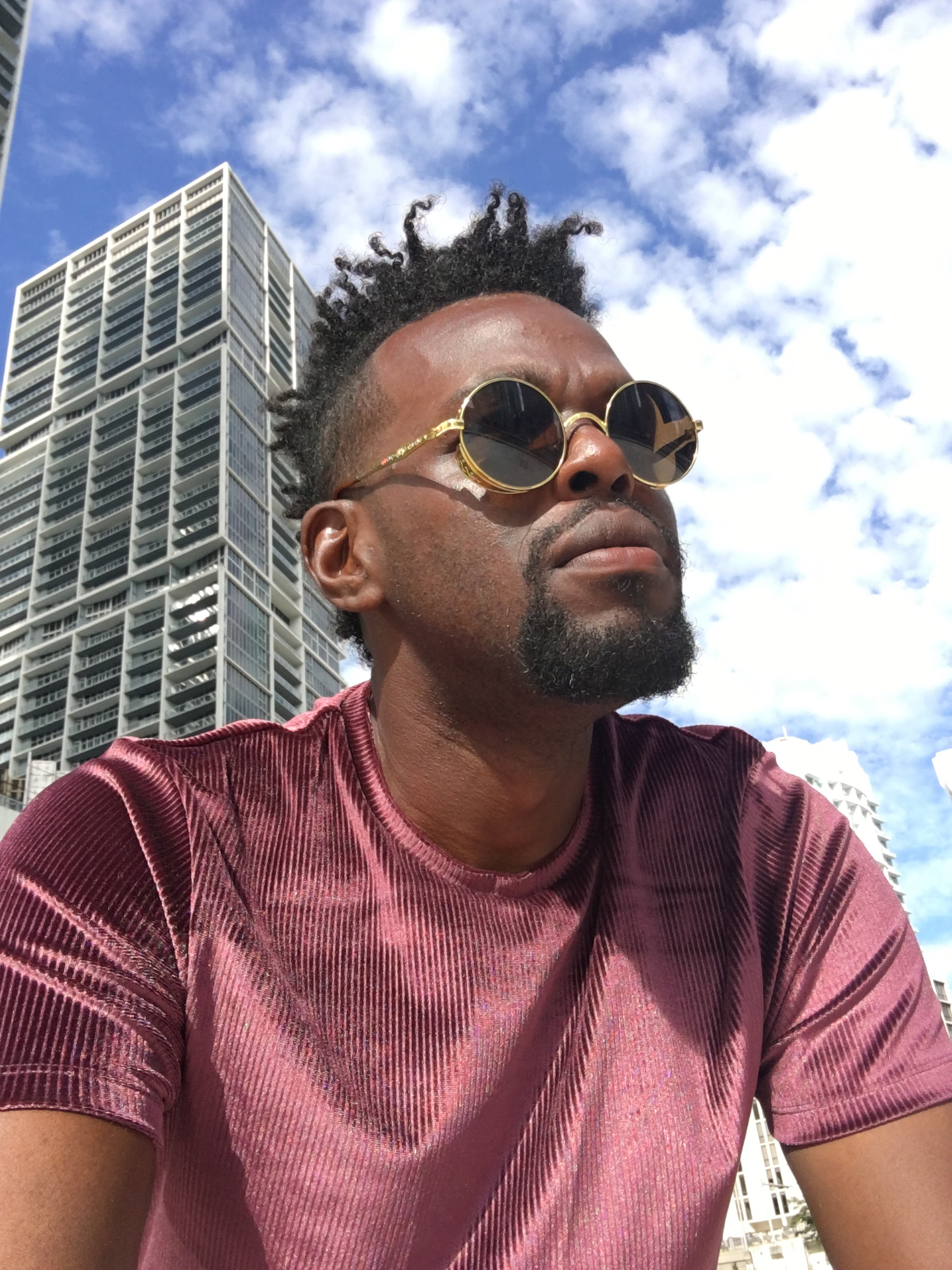
- Antonio Fresco in 2019
- Born: Miguel Antonio Matos; September 1, 1983 (age 41); Silver Spring, Maryland, US
- Occupations: DJ; radio personality; record producer; songwriter
- Years active: 2003–present
- Height: 6 ft 0 in (182.8 cm)
- Musical career
- Genres: EDM; moombahton; dancehall; dance-pop; reggaeton
- Instruments: Turntable; keyboards; synthesiser; sampler; sequencer
- Labels: Artist Intelligence Agency; Fresco Republic
- Website: antoniofresco.com

Signature
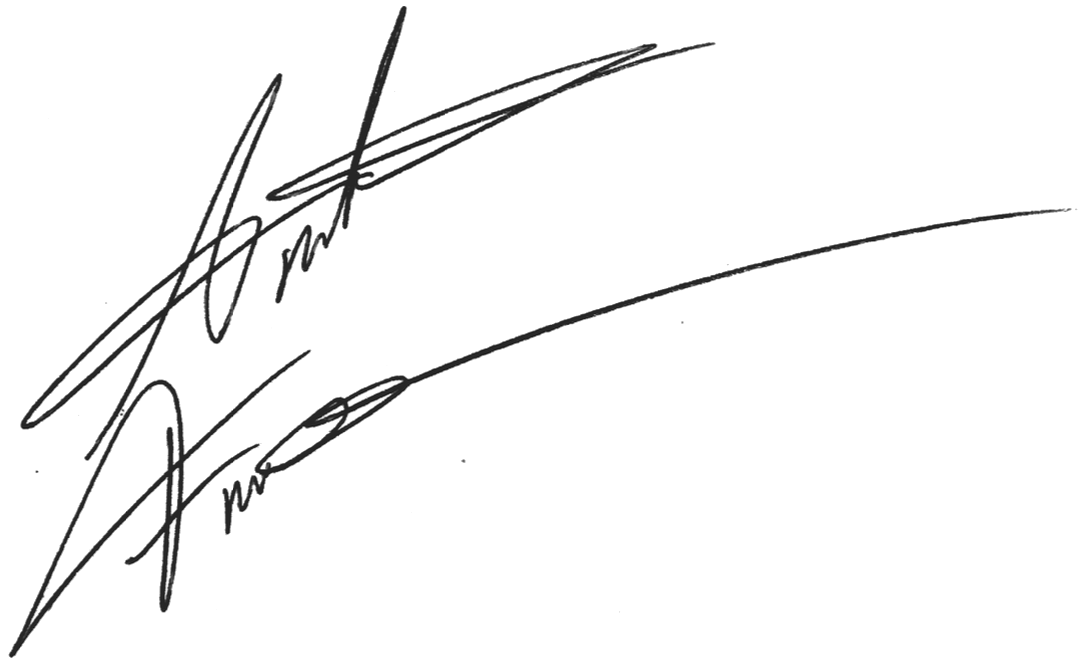

Miguel Antonio Matos (born September 1, 1983), known professionally as Antonio Fresco, is an American DJ, record producer and radio personality. He is an Afro-Latino of Dominican & Puerto Rican descent.

== Career ==
Fresco is a former radio personality and DJ for top rhythmic radio station, 97.9 The Beat in Dallas, Texas. During his tenure at the radio station, Antonio has interviewed many notable acts such as rappers Nelly, B.o.B., and former girl group, OMG Girlz. While he was living in Dallas, and on the air, he used the name M-Squared. In November 2011, Fresco produced and hosted a cypher called M-Squared Presents The Understanding – DFW Cypher that featured himself and 6 musical artist, including B-Hamp, from the Dallas Fort Worth area. The music video of the cypher was featured in Dallas area publication, D Magazine. In April 2014, he was voted Best DJ by Dallas Weekly.

Fresco joined singer Jonn Hart and producer Clayton William to release a trap song called Blow It. Blow It was re-released under the artist name Hella Louud (group made up of Hart and William) featuring Antonio Fresco.

In 2016, Fresco released the song Light It Up, which was his only official release of the year. The song was in the style of Melbourne bounce, which is a sub-genre of Electro house. Later that year, in August 2016, Fresco did an unofficial remix of Calvin Harris's and Rihanna's song This Is What You Came For.

In June 2017, Fresco collaborated with singer Kennis Clark to release the song Bout Time. The music video, directed by Prince Domonick, was done in collaboration with the New York Film Academy as one of their Industry Lab projects. His song After Party came later that year, followed by Lose Myself, which is a song that has dance pop and dancehall influences.

In September 2020, Fresco announced via his Twitter and Instagram that he had returned to radio and signed on as a DJ and On-Air Talent for contemporary hit radio station, HITS 97.3 in Miami, Florida.

== Early life ==
Miguel Antonio Matos was born on September 1, 1983, in Silver Spring, Maryland. He was raised in Baltimore, Maryland, by his mother, who is a Puerto Rican from New York.

== Discography ==
=== Singles ===
- 2015 "Blow it" with Jonn Hart & Clayton William
- 2016 "Light It Up"
- 2017 "Bout Time" with Kennis Clark
- 2017 "Lose Myself" featuring Wes Joseph
- 2019 "Rattlesnake" with Patricia Possollo featuring Lorena J'zel
- 2020 "Make Ya Move"
- 2020 "Leading Me On"

=== Remixes ===
- 2020 Halsey – Graveyard (Antonio Fresco Remix)
- 2020 Ariana Grande, Miley Cyrus and Lana Del Rey – Don't Call Me Angel (Antonio Fresco Remix)
