= Joseph Wooten =

American musician

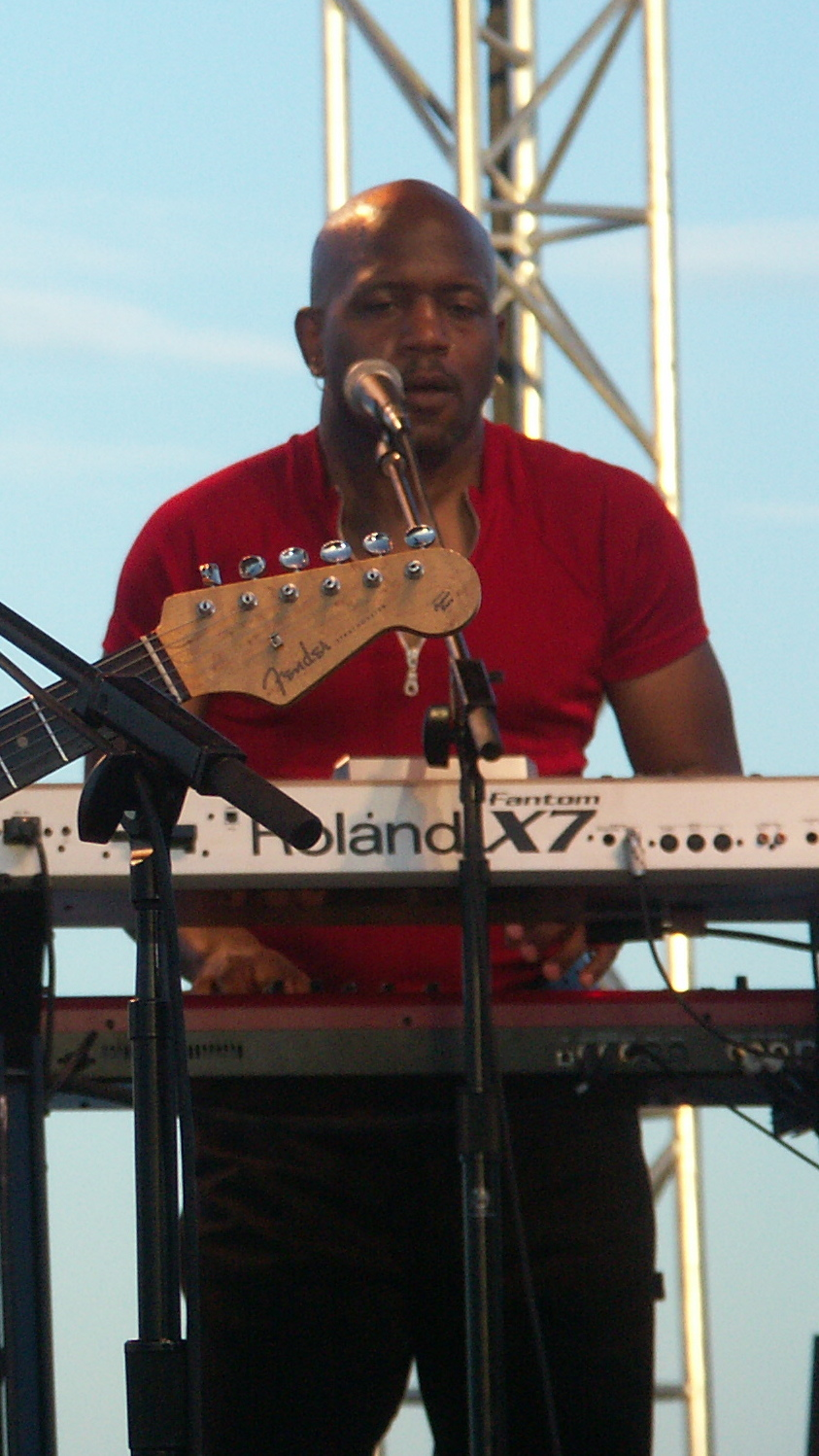
- Wooten performing with the Steve Miller Band in 2006

Background information
- Born: Joseph Allen Wooten; December 15, 1961 (age 64)
- Occupations: Keyboardist, songwriter, producer, author
- Instrument: Keyboards
- Years active: 1980–present
- Label: Xplosive Joseph Music
- Website: www.josephwooten.com

Joseph Wooten (born December 15, 1961) is an American keyboardist, singer, songwriter, author and philanthropist. Since 1993 he has been a member of the Steve Miller Band.

== Early life ==
Joseph was the fourth of five children born to Dorothy and Elijah Wooten. His brothers: Victor Wooten, Roy "Futureman" Wooten, Regi Wooten and Rudy Wooten (deceased) all are musicians. By the age of 11, Joseph was performing with his brothers in their family band, The Wooten Brothers. As a United States Air Force family, they moved around often, finally settling in the Warwick Lawns neighborhood of Newport News, Virginia in 1972. Joseph graduated from Denbigh High School in 1979. While in high school, Joseph and his brothers played in the country music venue at Busch Gardens theme park in Williamsburg, Virginia.

== Career ==
Joseph has been keyboard player and background vocalist since 1993 for the Steve Miller Band. Wooten also has two solo albums, Soul of Freedom (2013) and Hands of Soul (2003), as well as production credits on over 35 albums.

Wooten is a frequent speaker at schools across the country. In February 2018, he spoke at the Harmony School of Innovation in Fort Worth, Texas. Wooten gave a TEDx talk entitled "Nothing is Everything It All Matters" to a sold-out auditorium at the Halloran Centre in Downtown Memphis on January 6, 2018. Wooten performed his song "Unity" live on the Today in Nashville show in February 2018. Wooten performed "We Are American" with his band The Hands of Soul on the Today in Nashville show in November 2018.

== Discography ==
Vocals
Year	Title	Label
1985	Sax Attack	Arista Records
1988	Naked City – Weakness (12", Single)	Sure Sound Records
1996	A Show of Hands	Vix Records
1997	What Did He Say	Vanguard Records
1999	Yin-Yang	Compass Records
2001	Live in America	Compass Records
2005	Soul Circus	Vanguard Records
2008	Palmystery	Heads Up International
2010	Let Your Hair Down	Roadrunner Records
2010	Hey Yeah London	Uxbridge
2012	Words And Tones	Vix Records
2012	Sword And Stone	Vix Records

Solos
Year	Title	Label
2003	Hands of Soul	Xplosive Joseph Music
2016	Soul Of Freedom	Xplosive Joseph Music

== Publications ==
Wooten has also written a book titled: It All Matters: What I Believe, Words I Live By.

== Charitable work ==
In September 2015 collaborated with You are Never Alone Foundation (YANAF) to perform for students at Mount Anthony Union High School as part of a 'You are Never Alone Foundation Presentation' to raise awareness about homelessness.
