= Barry Green (musician) =

American musician

Barry Green is an American orchestral and solo double bass player and teacher. A graduate of the Indiana University School of Music, he was the principal bassist for the Cincinnati Symphony Orchestra. He has developed and publicized his own method for double bass.

== Works ==
He has published three instructional books, The Inner Game of Music (Doubleday, 1986-over 250,000 copies sold ), The Mastery of Music: Ten Pathways to True Artistry (Broadway Books 2003), and Bringing Music to Life (2009 GIA Music). Also, he has published a DVD on The Inner Game of Music (U. of Wisconsin-Clinics on cassette) and Bringing Music to Life (2009 GIA Music). In addition, he has released seven Inner Game of Music Workbooks for band, orchestra, small ensembles, keyboard, voice and all instruments in C and transposing keys plus a workbook for SEBSEQUA (Barber Shop and Sweet Adelines choruses).

His bass methods include The Popular Bass Method (with Jeff Neighbor) and Advanced Techniques of Double Bass Playing. He has seven solo LPs and three solo CDs, including, most recently, Live from St. Croix with Barry Green and James Hart and Ole-Cool with accompanying colleagues from Spain and America, and Seat of the Pants (music of Lenny Carlson).

He taught bass and music for the San Francisco Symphony Education Department and still teaches at The University of California, Santa Cruz. He is a former Executive Director of the International Society of Bassists (1975-1981) and is the founder of the Northern California Bass Club. In San Diego, Green is active performing and directing concert programs for the public including a narrative story of Anna's Way with text by Alan Scofield with solo bass, piano, percussion, narrator and background visuals. He tours extensively with this story of the tai chi Master and his apprentice-15-year-old female bassist.

He performs on Evanescence's Synthesis and on numerous albums with Erich Kunzel and the Cincinnati Pops Orchestra.
