= Stanley Clarke =

American bassist (born 1951)

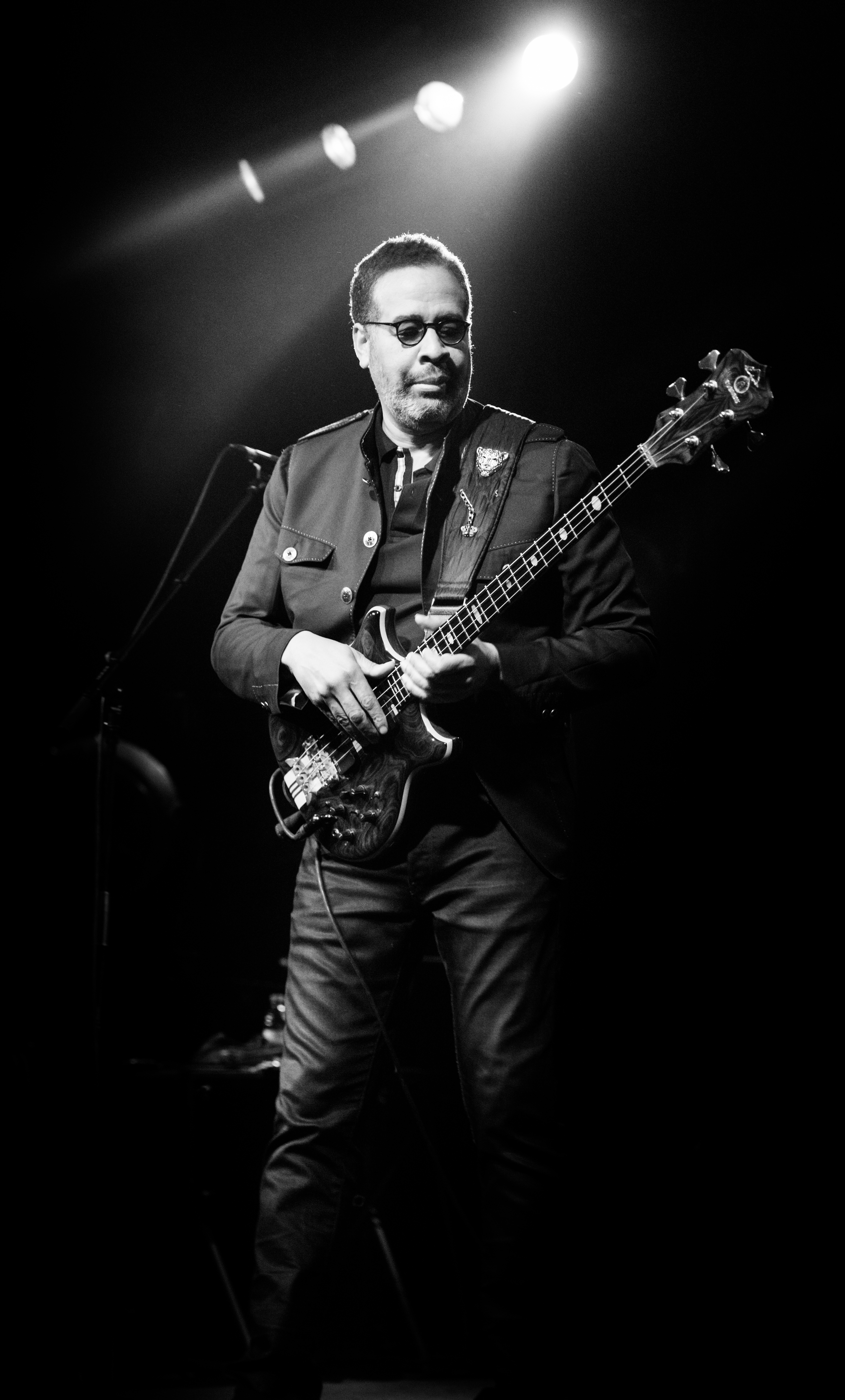
- Stanley Clarke at Leverkusener Jazztage (Germany), November 7, 2016

Background information
- Born: June 30, 1951 (age 75); Philadelphia, Pennsylvania, U.S.
- Genres: Jazz; fusion; crossover jazz; jazz funk; urban contemporary
- Occupations: Musician; composer
- Instruments: Double bass; bass guitar
- Years active: 1966–present
- Labels: Nemperor; Epic; Heads Up; Mack Avenue; Elektra
- Website: stanleyclarke.com

Stanley Clarke (born June 30, 1951) is an American bassist, composer and founding member of Return to Forever, one of the first jazz fusion bands. Clarke gave the bass guitar a prominence it lacked in jazz-related music. He is the first jazz-fusion bassist to headline tours, sell out shows worldwide and have recordings attain Gold certification.

Clarke is the recipient of five Grammy Awards, with fifteen nominations, three as a solo artist, one with the Stanley Clarke Band, and one with Return to Forever. Clarke was selected to become a 2022 recipient of the National Endowment for the Arts Jazz Masters Fellowship. A Stanley Clarke electric bass is permanently on display at the National Museum of African American History and Culture in Washington, D.C.

Clarke has composed many TV and film scores, beginning with one episode of Pee-wee's Playhouse in 1987 for which he received a Daytime Emmy nomination in 1988. Notable film scores by Clarke include Boyz n the Hood (1991), Passenger 57 (1992), The Book of Love (2016) and Halston (2019). His television work includes music for episodes of Tales from the Crypt, Hull High and Knightwatch.

== Music career ==
=== Early years ===
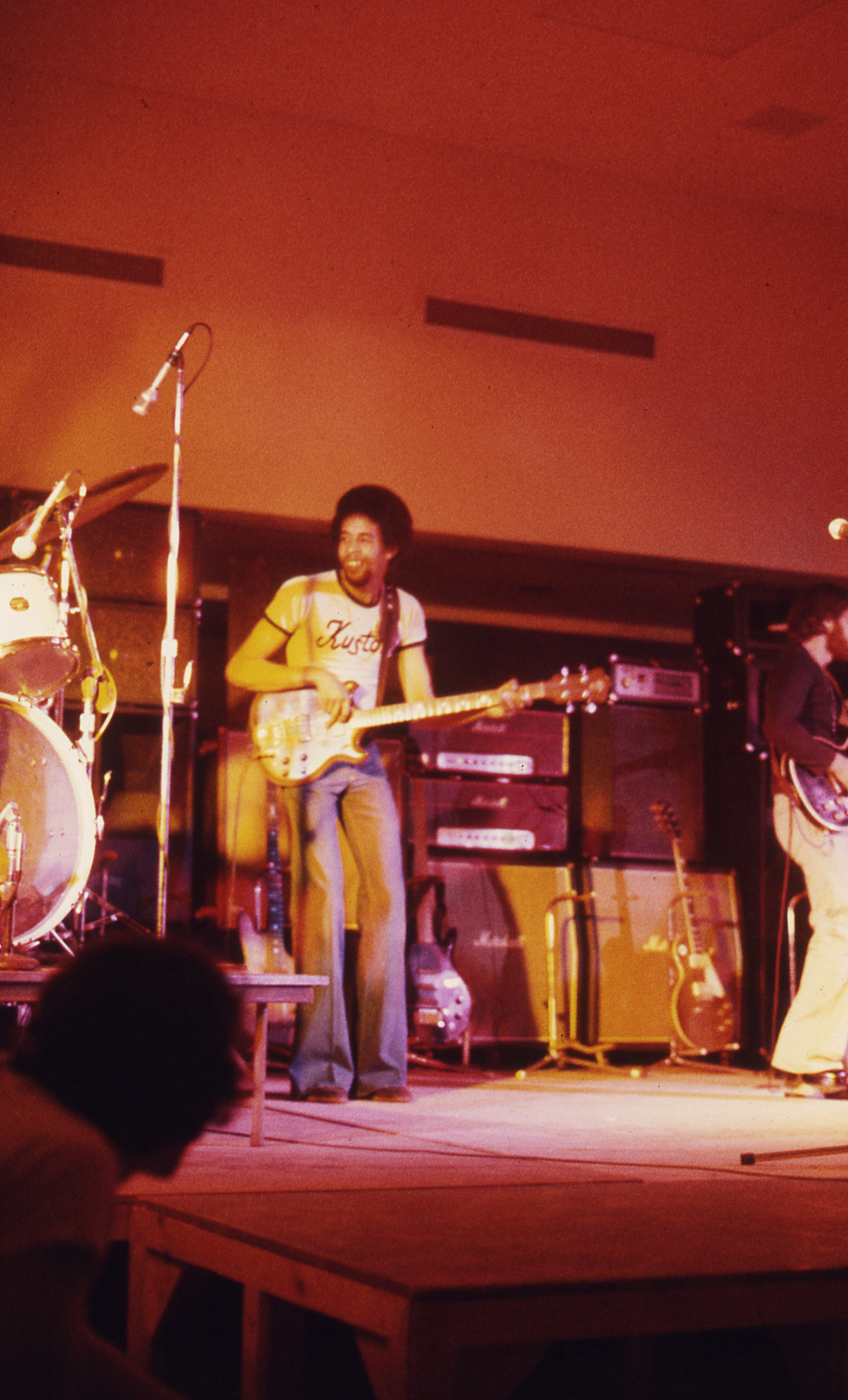
Clarke with Return to Forever, Onondaga Community College, Syracuse, New York, 1974

Clarke was born on June 30, 1951, in Philadelphia. His mother sang opera around the house, belonged to a church choir, and encouraged him to study music. He started on accordion, then tried violin. But he felt awkward holding such a small instrument in his big hands when he was twelve years old and over six feet tall. No one wanted the acoustic bass in the corner, so he picked it up. He took lessons on the double bass at the Settlement Music School in Philadelphia, studying classical bass for five years under Eligio Rossi. He picked up bass guitar in his teens so that he could perform at parties and imitate the rock and pop bands that girls liked.

Clarke attended the Philadelphia Musical Academy (later known as the Philadelphia College of the Performing Arts, and ultimately as the University of the Arts, after having merged with the Philadelphia College of Art) and after graduating moved to New York City in 1971. His recording debut was with Curtis Fuller. He worked with Joe Henderson and Pharoah Sanders, then in 1972 with Tony Williams Lifetime Experience, Stan Getz, Dexter Gordon, and Art Blakey, followed by Gil Evans, Mel Lewis, and Horace Silver.

=== Return to Forever (band) ===
Clarke intended to become the first black musician in the Philadelphia Orchestra until he met jazz pianist Chick Corea. At the time, Corea was working with Stan Getz putting together a new backing band for him and writing music for the group; these pieces first surfaced on two albums recorded in February/March 1972 in New York, Captain Marvel (credited to Getz, released in 1975) and Return to Forever (credited to Corea, issued in Europe in 1972). Clarke's playing and improvising was prominent on both albums; the band also played a couple of gigs with Getz in Europe. At this early stage, the band as separate from Getz was mostly a studio side project, but the members soon realized that it had potential as a regular live band, and so the band Return to Forever had been born.

The first edition of Return to Forever performed primarily Latin-oriented music and used only acoustic instruments (except for Corea's Fender Rhodes piano). This band consisted of singer Flora Purim, her husband Airto Moreira (both Brazilians) on drums and percussion, Corea's longtime musical co-worker Joe Farrell on saxophone and flute, and Clarke on bass. Their first album, titled Return to Forever, was recorded for ECM Records in 1972. The second album, Light as a Feather (1973), was released by Polydor and included the song "Spain".

After the second album, Farrell, Purim and Moreira left the group to form their own band, and guitarist Bill Connors, drummer Steve Gadd and percussionist Mingo Lewis were added. Lenny White (who had played with Corea in Miles Davis's band) replaced Gadd and Lewis on drums and percussion, and the group's third album, Hymn of the Seventh Galaxy (1973), was released.

Fusion was a combination of rock and jazz which they helped develop in the early 1970s. Clarke was playing a new kind of music, using new techniques, and giving the bass guitar a prominence it lacked. He drew attention to the bass guitar as a solo instrument that could be melodic and dominant in addition to being part of the rhythm section. For helping to bring the bass guitar to the front of the band, Clarke cites Jaco Pastorius, Paul McCartney, Jack Bruce, and Larry Graham.

After Return to Forever's second album, Light as a Feather, Clarke received job offers from Bill Evans, Miles Davis, and Ray Manzarek of the Doors, but he remained with Return to Forever until 1977. During the early 1980s, he toured with Corea and Return to Forever, then worked with Bobby Lyle, Eliane Elias, David Benoit and Michel Petrucciani. He toured in a band with Herbie Hancock and Wayne Shorter in 1991. In 1998 he founded Superband with Lenny White, Larry Carlton, and Jeff Lorber.

=== Solo ===
Corea produced Clarke's first solo album, Children of Forever (1973), and played keyboards on it with guitarist Pat Martino, drummer Lenny White, flautist Art Webb, and vocalists Andy Bey and Dee Dee Bridgewater. Clarke played double bass and bass guitar.

Clarke's second self-titled album Stanley Clarke (1974) featured Tony Williams on drums, Bill Connors on electric and acoustic guitar, and Jan Hammer on synthesizer [Moog], electric piano, organ, and piano [acoustic].

While on tour, British guitarist Jeff Beck was performing the song "Power" from that album, and this was the impetus for their meeting and Beck's introduction to Hammer. They toured together, and Beck appeared on some of Clarke's albums, including Journey to Love (1975) and Modern Man (1978).

The album School Days (Nemperor Records, 1976) brought Clarke the most attention and praise he had received so far. The title song became so popular that fans called out for it during concerts.

=== Rock and funk ===
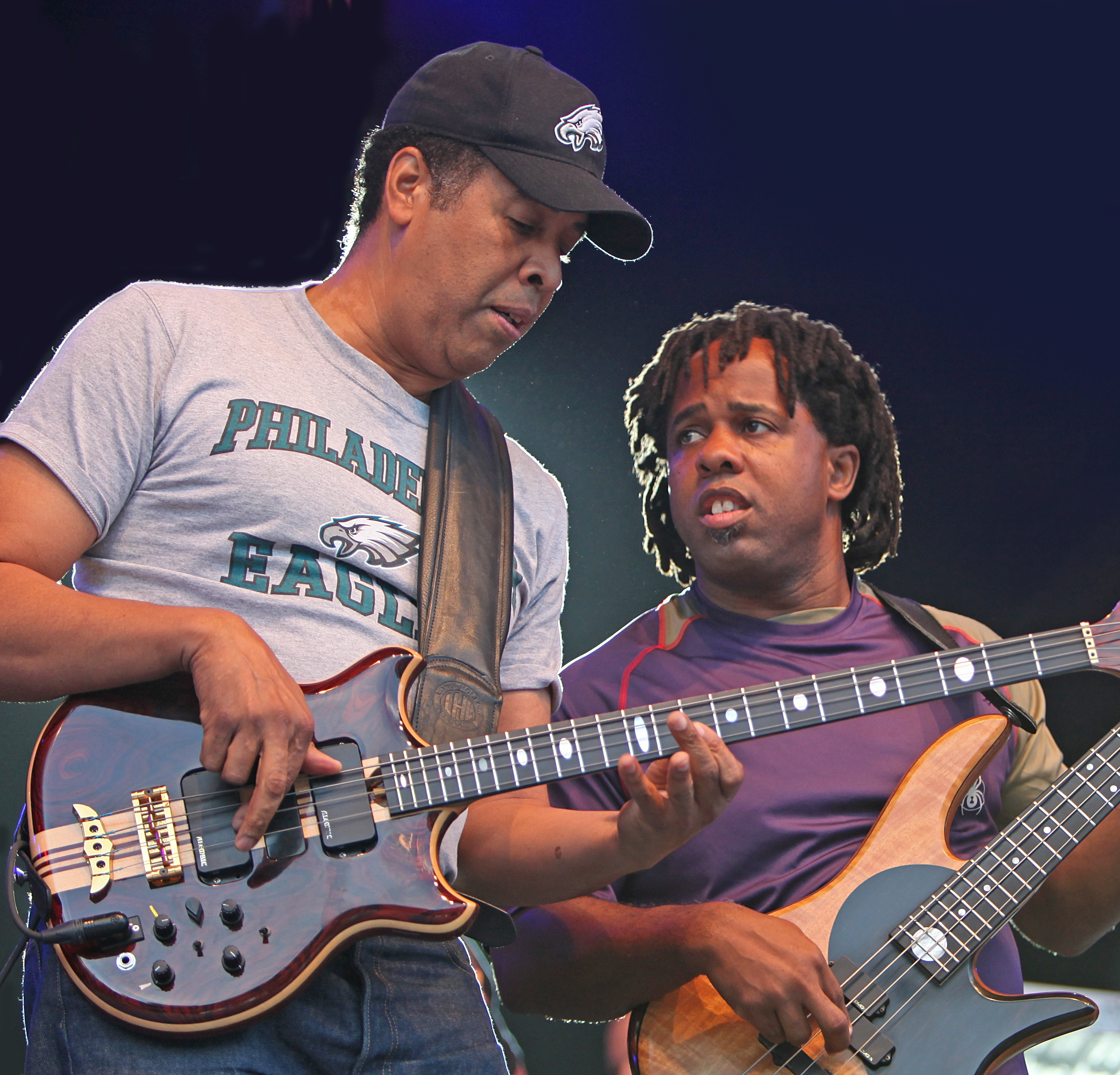
Stanley Clarke and Victor Wooten in the SMV Thunder Tour, Stockholm Jazz Festival, 2009

Clarke has spent much of his career outside jazz. In 1979, Ronnie Wood of the Rolling Stones formed the New Barbarians with Clarke and Keith Richards. Two years later, Clarke and keyboardist George Duke formed the Clarke/Duke Project, which combined pop, jazz, funk, and R&B. They met in 1971 in Finland when Duke was with Cannonball Adderley. They recorded together for the first time on Clarke's album Journey to Love. Their first album contained the single "Sweet Baby", which became a top 20 pop hit. They reunited for tours during the 1990s and the 2000s.

Clarke joined fellow bassist Paul McCartney in 1981 to play bass guitar on McCartney's solo studio albums Tug of War (1982) and Pipes of Peace (1983).

=== The Stanley Clarke Band ===
The Stanley Clarke Band is an American jazz band led by Clarke. He founded the band in 1985, with Ruslan Sirota, Shariq Tucker, Cameron Graves, Beka Gochiashvili, Salar Nader, and Evan Garr. They released the album Find Out!. With a new group, The Stanley Clarke Band released the album The Stanley Clarke Band which won the 2011 Grammy Award for Best Contemporary Jazz Album. Their album The Message was released in 2018.

==== Career ====
The band's first album Find Out! was recorded at Sunset Sound Studios and was released in 1985 by Sony. With a band composed of Stanley Clarke on bass, Ronald Bruner Jr. on drums, and Ruslan Sirota on keyboards, the Stanley Clarke Band released The Stanley Clarke Band album. It was produced by Lenny White and Stanley Clarke and featured pianist Hiromi."

The album The Stanley Clarke Band won the Grammy Award for Best Contemporary Jazz Album at the 53rd Annual Grammy Awards. Additionally, the track "No Mystery" was nominated for Best Pop Instrumental Performance.

The Stanley Clarke Band with Clarke, Bruner Jr., and Sirota released The Message.

Discography

- Find Out! (Sony BMG, 1985)
- The Rite of Strings (Gai Saber, 1995)
- The Stanley Clarke Band (Heads Up, 2010)
- Up (Mack Avenue, 2014)
- The Message (Mack Avenue, 2018)

== Other groups ==
In 1988, Clarke and drummer Stewart Copeland of the rock band the Police formed Animal Logic with singer-songwriter Deborah Holland. He and Copeland were friends before the Police formed. Copeland appeared on Clarke's album Up (Mack Avenue, 2014).

In 2014 Clarke was invited on stage with Primus during their "Primus and the Chocolate Factory" tour featuring other guest appearances from Stewart Copeland and Danny Carey of Tool to perform the Primus classic "Here Come the Bastards" with Clarke and Les Claypool having a shred bass duel midway.

In 2020 Clarke was invited as a teacher at a Bass Bootcamp hosted by bassist Gerald Veasley. The camp was hosted in Philadelphia where bassists of all ages were taught and featured many educators and professionals such as Richard Waller, Rob Smith, Freekbass, Michael Manring, and more. Unfortunately the camp was delayed and moved to 2021 due to the COVID-19 pandemic.

=== Other jazz groups ===
In 2005, Clarke toured as Trio! with Béla Fleck and Jean-Luc Ponty. Clarke and Ponty had worked in a trio with guitarist Al Di Meola in 1995 and recorded the album The Rite of Strings. They worked in a trio again in 2012 with guitarist Biréli Lagrène and two years later recorded D-Stringz (Impulse!, 2015).

In 2008, Clarke formed SMV with bassists Marcus Miller and Victor Wooten and recorded the album Thunder.

In 2009 he released Jazz in the Garden, featuring the Stanley Clarke Trio with pianist Hiromi Uehara and drummer Lenny White. The following year he released the Stanley Clarke Band, with Ruslan Sirota on keyboards and Ronald Bruner, Jr. on drums; the album also features Hiromi on piano.

His album Up, released in 2014, has enlisted an all-star cast in his musical ensemble, including former Return to Forever bandmate Chick Corea on piano, with drummer Stewart Copeland (The Police) and guitarist Jimmy Herring (Widespread Panic), among others.

In 2018, Clarke released The Message, featuring the new Stanley Clarke Band with Cameron Graves on synthesizers, pianist Beka Gochiashvili, and drummer Mike Mitchell. The album also features rapper/beatboxer Doug E. Fresh and trumpeter Mark Isham.

In 2019, The Stanley Clarke Band has transformed again as Clarke, Cameron Graves, and Beka Gochiashvili were joined by Shariq Tucker on drums, Salar Nader on tabla, and Evan Garr on violin.

=== Television and movies ===
Clarke has written scores for television and movies. His first score, for Pee-wee's Playhouse, was nominated for an Emmy Award. He also composed music for the movies Boyz n the Hood, Passenger 57, and What's Love Got to Do with It, the television programs Lincoln Heights, Waynehead, Static Shock, A Man Called Hawk and Soul Food, and the video for "Remember the Time" by Michael Jackson.

In 2007, Clarke released the DVD Night School: An Evening of Stanley Clarke and Friends, a concert that was recorded in 2002 at the Musicians' Institute in Hollywood. Clarke plays both acoustic and electric bass and is joined by guests Stewart Copeland, Lenny White, Béla Fleck, Shelia E., and Patrice Rushen.

Clarke's TV and movie music contribution can be found in Soul Food (2000–2004), Static Shock (2000–2004), First Sunday (2008), Soul Men (2008), The Best Man Holiday (2013), and Barbershop: The Next Cut (2016).

His latest score composition work was for the documentary film Halston (2019), directed by Frédéric Tcheng. The film tells the extraordinary story of the life and death of the American fashion designer, Roy Halston Frowick.

== Record label ==
In 2010, Clarke founded Roxboro Entertainment Group in Topanga, California. He named it after the high school that he attended in the 1960s. The label's first releases were by guitarist Lloyd Gregory and composer Kennard Ramsey. Roxboro's roster also includes keyboardist Sunnie Paxson, pianist Ruslan Sirota, and pianist Beka Gochiashvili.

== Electric bass technique ==
When playing electric bass, Clarke places his right hand so that his fingers approach the strings much as they would on an upright bass, but rotated through 90 degrees. To achieve this, his forearm lies above and nearly parallel to the strings, while his wrist is hooked downward at nearly a right angle. For lead and solo playing, his fingers partially hook underneath the strings so that when released, the strings snap against the frets, producing a biting percussive attack. In addition to an economical variation on the funky Larry Graham-style slap-n'-pop technique, Clarke also uses downward thrusts of the entire right hand, striking two or more strings from above with his fingernails (examples of this technique include "School Days", "Rock and Roll Jelly", "Wild Dog", and "Danger Street"). Clarke has been playing Alembic short scale basses since 1973. Alembic also manufactures a series Stanley Clarke Signature Bass models.

== Awards and honors ==
=== Grammy Awards ===
Year	Nominee/work	Category	Result
1976	No Mystery (Track)	Best Jazz Performance by a Group	Won
1977	Life is Just A Game (Track)	Best Instrumental Arrangement	Nominated
1979	Modern Man (Album)	Best R&B Instrumental Performance	Nominated
1982	The Clarke/Duke Project (Album)	Best R&B Performance by a Duo or Group with Vocals	Nominated
1985	Time Exposure (Track)	Best R&B Instrumental Performance	Nominated
1987	Overjoyed (Track)	Best Pop Instrumental Performance	Nominated
1987	The Boys Of Johnson Street (Track)	Best R&B Instrumental Performance	Nominated
2004	Where Is The Love (Track)	Best R&B Performance by a Duo or Group with Vocals	Nominated
2011	The Stanley Clarke Band (Album)	Best Contemporary Jazz Album	Won
2011	No Mystery (Track)	Best Pop Instrumental Performance	Nominated
2012	Forever (Album)	Best Jazz Instrumental Album	Won
2015	Last Train To Sanity (Track)	Best Instrumental Composition	Nominated

=== Latin Grammy Awards ===
Clarke received the Latin Grammy for Best Instrumental Album in 2011 at the 12th Annual Latin Grammy Awards for the album "Forever", along with Chick Corea and Lenny White.

=== Other honors ===
- Lifetime Achievement Award, Bass Player, 2006
- Honorary doctorate in fine arts, The University of the Arts, 2008
- Honorary Doctorate in Music, Musicians Institute, 2009
- Miles Davis Award, 2011
- NEA Jazz Master Fellowship, 2021
