= J. D. Blair =

American drummer

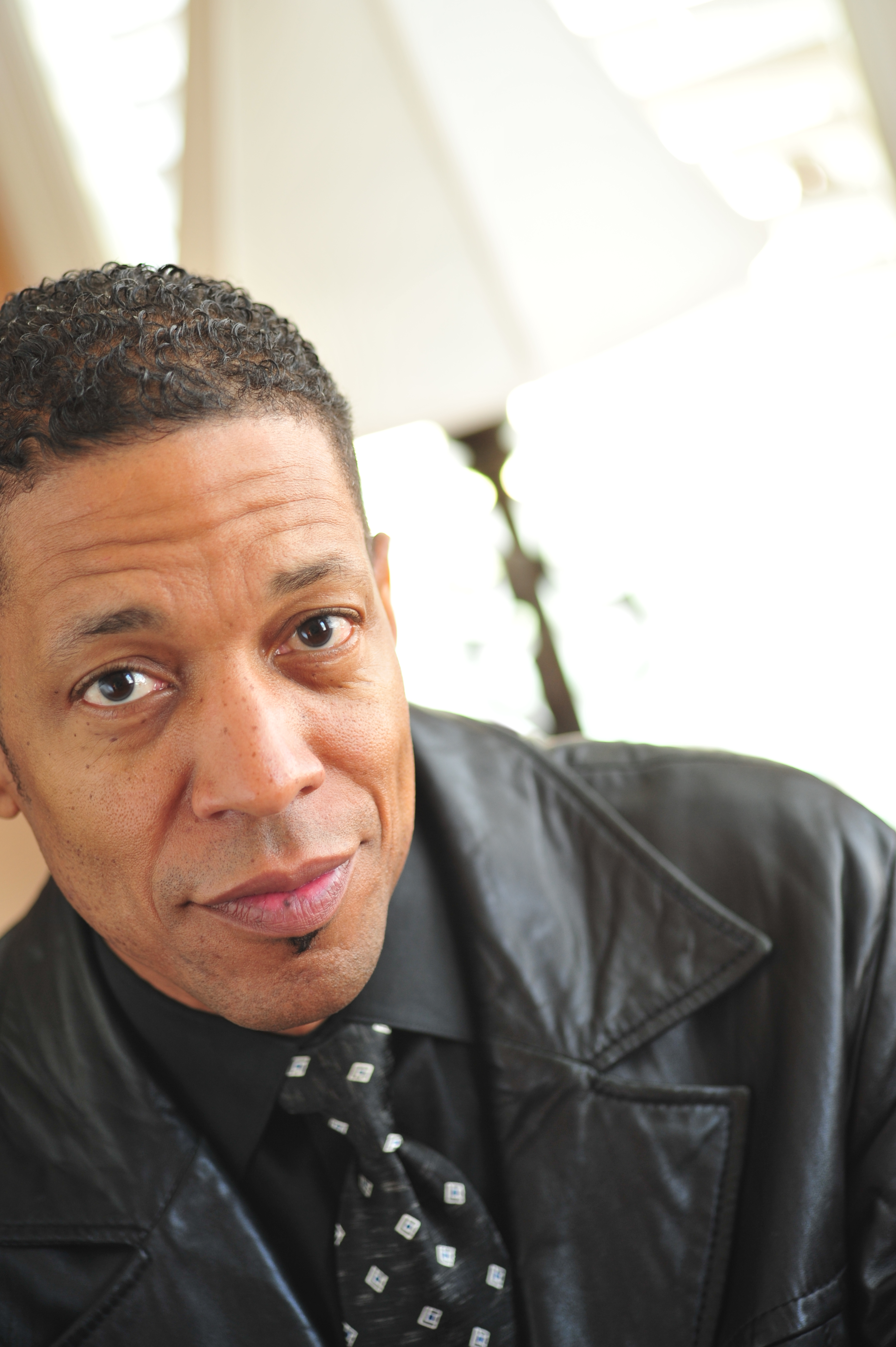
J. D. Blair, "The Groove Regulator"

JD Blair is an American drummer who plays country music, funk, jazz, and other genres. He has released four solo albums, and is mentioned as an influential character in Victor Wooten's book The Music Lesson as well as Wooten's DVD Groove Workshop. He is an AFM #369 member and a founding member of Mu Phi Sigma, National Percussion Fraternity.

== Early life ==
Blair was born in Las Vegas, Nevada. Blair's formal music training started at Lee High School in Huntsville, Alabama, with Bob Baccus as his instructor. Afterwards, Blair was recruited by John Paul Lindberg to attend Norfolk State University. He also attended Alabama A & M University as a Telecommunications Major. Before playing music professionally, Blair worked as a disc jockey at a Christian radio station (WNDA).

== Career ==
Blair has played with Wynonna Judd, Lyle Lovett, Shelby Lynne, Big and Rich, and Shania Twain. He has received the Drum! Magazine's 2000 Country Drummer of the Year award and the Louis Armstrong Jazz Award.

In 2013, Blair played dates on Victor Wooten's "Sword and Stone, Words and Tones Tour". J.D. was the drummer for Shania Twain's "Still the One" show in Las Vegas, Nevada. Wooten and Blair were to perform as 2 Minds, 1 Groove.

== Partial artist discography ==
Yolanda Adams, Chalmers Alford, Sam "Shake" Anderson, India Arie, Bob Babbitt, A Special Blend, Ayla Brown, Larry Carlton, Jeff Carruthers, Bootsy Collins, George Duke, First Call, Tommy Emmanuel, The Eternal Chariot Singers, Anthony Gomes, Heirborne, Richard "Groove" Holmes, Paul Jackson, Jr., Wynonna Judd, Phil Keaggy, Chris Kent, Matthews, Wright & King, Erin Leahy, Jeff Lorber, Lyle Lovett, Shelby Lynne, Yo-Yo Ma, Natalie MacMaster, Donnie McClurkin, Donna McElroy, Rod McGaha, Gary Motley, Point Of Grace, Riapsedon, Mike Stern, Take 6, Takana, Shane Theriot, Shania Twain, Malcolm Jamal Warner, Kirk Whalum, BeBe & CeCe Winans, Joseph, Regi, Roy, & Victor Wooten.

== Video credits ==
- Still the One: Live from Vegas – Shania Twain
- "Fake ID" – Big and Rich
- "Holiday On Ice" – Natalie MacMaster
- "Up!" Live in Chicago – Shania Twain
- "She's Not Just A Pretty Face" – Shania Twain
- "Come On Over" – Shania Twain
- "Honey, I'm Home" – Shania Twain
- "Open Praise" – Madison Mission Mass Choir
- "I Hung It Up" – Junior Brown
- "No Way Out" – Suzy Bogguss
- "Slow Me Down" – Shelby Lynne
- "I Got A Love" – Matthews, Wright, & King
- "Come Together" – Delbert McClinton
- "One More For The Road" – Suzy Bogguss & Chet Atkins
- "Church Song" – Lyle Lovett
- "Crazy When It Comes To You" – Margaret Bell
- "Walls" – DC Talk

== Tours ==
- 2015 – Solo Artist, & Victor Wooten
- 2014 – Shania Twain, & Victor Wooten
- 2013 – Artist, Shania Twain, & Victor Wooten
- 2012 – Artist, Natalie MacMaster, Shania Twain & Victor Wooten
- 2011 – Natalie MacMaster & Victor Wooten
- 2010 – Natalie MacMaster & Victor Wooten
- 2009 – Natalie MacMaster & Victor Wooten
- 2008 – The Ascenxion Project, Digby, & Natalie MacMaster
- 2007 – The Ascenxion Project, Digby, & Natalie MacMaster
- 2004 – Shania Twain & Victor Wooten
- 2003 – Shania Twain & Victor Wooten
- 2002 – Wynonna Judd & Shania Twain
- 2001 – Point Of Grace & Victor Wooten
- 2000 – Shelby Lynne, Take 6, & Victor Wooten
- 1999 – Shania Twain & Victor Wooten
- 1998 – Shania Twain & Victor Wooten
- 1997 – Rod McGaha & Victor Wooten
- 1996 – Take 6 & Victor Wooten
- 1995 – Shelby Lynne & Take 6
- 1994 – Shelby Lynne
- 1993 – Matthews, Wright, & King
- 1992 – Lyle Lovett's Large Band

== Film credits ==
- "America's Dumbest Criminals" (Nationally Syndicated) Role: Undercover Cop & Uniformed Policeman. Prod. Co. & Director: Enthos/Scene Three, Inc; Glenn Petach
- "Finally Gets Wings!" Role: Krystal Patron. Prod. Co. & Director: Ogilvy & Mather/Atlanta
- "Crocodile Shoes" Role: Chester the Drummer. Prod. Co. & Director: Big Boy Productions; Robert Knights

== Recordings as a solo artist ==
- "Grace" (2016 release.)
- "2012?" on Vix Records, LLC.
- "3HREE"
- "Come On!"
- "Regulated!"
