= Hot Swing! =

Live album

Live album by Mark O'Connor's Hot Swing Trio
- Released: 2001
- Recorded: 2000
- Genre: Swing Jazz
- Length: 50:05
- Label: OMAC Records
- Producer: Mark O'Connor

Mark O'Connor's Hot Swing Trio chronology
Hot Swing! (2001)	Hot Swing Trio: In Full Swing (2003)

Professional ratings
Review scores
Source	Rating
Allmusic	link

Hot Swing is a live swing jazz album by Mark O'Connor, Frank Vignola and Jon Burr. The trio later released two more similarly-themed albums, one live and one in the studio, under the name of "Mark O'Connor's Hot Swing Trio". These were In Full Swing and Live in New York. The album is a sort of dedication to Stéphane Grappelli, one of O'Connor's mentors and influences (Grappelli began to teach him when O'Connor was seventeen).

The album draws upon the works of Django Reinhardt and Stéphane Grappelli (and the Duke Ellington, Johnny Mercer, and Billy Strayhorn standard, "Satin Doll") in addition to original works by O'Connor and Burr.

== Track listing ==
1. "Swingin' on the 'Ville" (O'Connor) – 5:11
2. "Nuages" (Django Reinhardt) – 5:31
3. "Sweet Suzanne" (O'Connor) – 6:36
4. "Satin Doll" (Duke Ellington, Johnny Mercer, Billy Strayhorn) – 4:48
5. "Minor Swing" (Stéphane Grappelli, Django Reinhardt) – 6:25
6. "In the Cluster Blues" (O'Connor) – 8:24
7. "Lament" (Jon Burr) – 5:12
8. "Pickles on the Elbow" (O'Connor) – 7:54

== Personnel ==
- Mark O'Connor – Violin
- Frank Vignola – Guitar
- Jon Burr – Bass

also

- Dorothea von Haeften – Album Photography
- Marty O'Connor – Additional Photography
- Dennis Gaul – Recording
- jbQ, Yonkers, New York – Mastering
