= Coming Home (O'Connor Band album) =

Studio album by O'Connor Band
- Released: August 5, 2016
- Studio: House of Blues, Nashville
- Genre: Country, bluegrass
- Length: 43:48
- Label: Rounder
- Producer: Gregg Field, Mark O'Connor, Forrest O'Connor

Coming Home is the debut album by the O'Connor Band. The album was produced by Gregg Field, Mark O'Connor, and Forrest O'Connor, and it was released by Rounder Records in August 2016. It debuted at No. 1 on the Billboard Top Bluegrass Albums chart and won the Grammy Award for Best Bluegrass Album at the 59th Annual Grammy Awards in February 2017.

== Critical reception ==
A critic at the web site No Depression wrote, "There are some albums that are so sonically gorgeous, they sound as if the music has arrived from another plane; the players are so connected to each other, weaving their own parts so tightly together, the sound encloses you in its warmth and beauty…The twelve songs on Coming Home display the elegance, polished style, and supple songwriting of a group that's been playing together for years…Every song on Coming Home is a treasure."

== Track listing ==
No.	Title	Writer(s)	Length
1.	"Always Do"	Jim Shirey	3:13
2.	"Coming Home"	Forrest O'Connor	3:23
3.	"I Haven't Said I Love You in a While"	Forrest O'Connor	3:54
4.	"Ruby, Are You Mad at Your Man?"	Cousin Emmy	3:03
5.	"What Have I Been Saying?"	Forrest O'Connor	3:48
6.	"Jerusalem Ridge"	Bill Monroe, arr. Mark O'Connor	3:44
7.	"The Sweet Ones"	Kate Lee, Jon Weisberger	3:09
8.	"Blacktop Boy"	Kate Lee, Pat Alger	3:41
9.	"You Too"	Forrest O'Connor, Jim Shirey	3:45
10.	"Fishers Hornpipe"	Trad., arr. Mark O'Connor	3:42
11.	"Old Black Creek"	Kate Lee, Pat Alger	3:36
12.	"Fiddler Going Home"	Mark O'Connor	5:03

== Personnel ==
- Mark O'Connor – producer, violin, background vocals
- Maggie O'Connor – violin, vocals
- Forrest O'Connor – producer, mandolin, vocals
- Kate Lee – violin, vocals
- Joe Smart – guitar, background vocals
- Geoff Saunders – bass, banjo, background vocals
- Gregg Field – producer, percussion
