= Pierrot lunaire (disambiguation) =

Pierrot Lunaire is a melodrama by Arnold Schoenberg.

Pierrot Lunaire may also refer to:

- Pierrot lunaire (book), the cycle of poems by Albert Giraud
- Pierrot Lunaire (band), the Italian band
- Pierrot Lunaire (film), a 2014 film
