= Fanfare for the Volunteer =

Studio album by Mark O'Connor
- Released: 1999
- Recorded: November 1998
- Genre: Classical
- Length: 56:40
- Label: Sony Classical
- Producer: Steven Epstein

Mark O'Connor chronology
Midnight on the Water (1998)	Fanfare for the Volunteer (1999)	The American Seasons (2001)

Fanfare for the Volunteer is an album of three pieces for violin and orchestra by composer and violinist Mark O'Connor with the London Philharmonic Orchestra under the direction of Steven Mercurio. Originally conceived as O'Connor's second "fiddle concerto", the three movements became separate pieces during the course of composition. Like his other classical works, the three pieces on the album: "Call of the Mockingbird", "Trail of Tears" and "Fanfare for the Volunteer" use styles and motifs from American folk music and the traditional Anglo-American fiddling techniques on which O'Connor was weaned.

== Track listing ==
All music written by Mark O'Connor

1. "Call of the Mockingbird" – 20:26
2. "Trail of Tears" – 16:08
3. "Fanfare for the Volunteer" – 20:06

== Personnel ==
- Mark O'Connor - violin
- London Philharmonic Orchestra - orchestra
- Steven Mercurio - conductor
