= Moonlight Waltz (disambiguation) =

Moonlight Waltz is an album by Italian band Theatres des Vampires.

Moonlight Waltz may also refer to:

- Moonlight Waltz, a 2007 Royal Doulton figurine

== See also ==
- "Lonesome Moonlight Waltz", a 1972 song by Bill Monroe
- "Misty Moonlight Waltz", by Mark O'Connor from his 1979 album Soppin' the Gravy
