= Hautville =

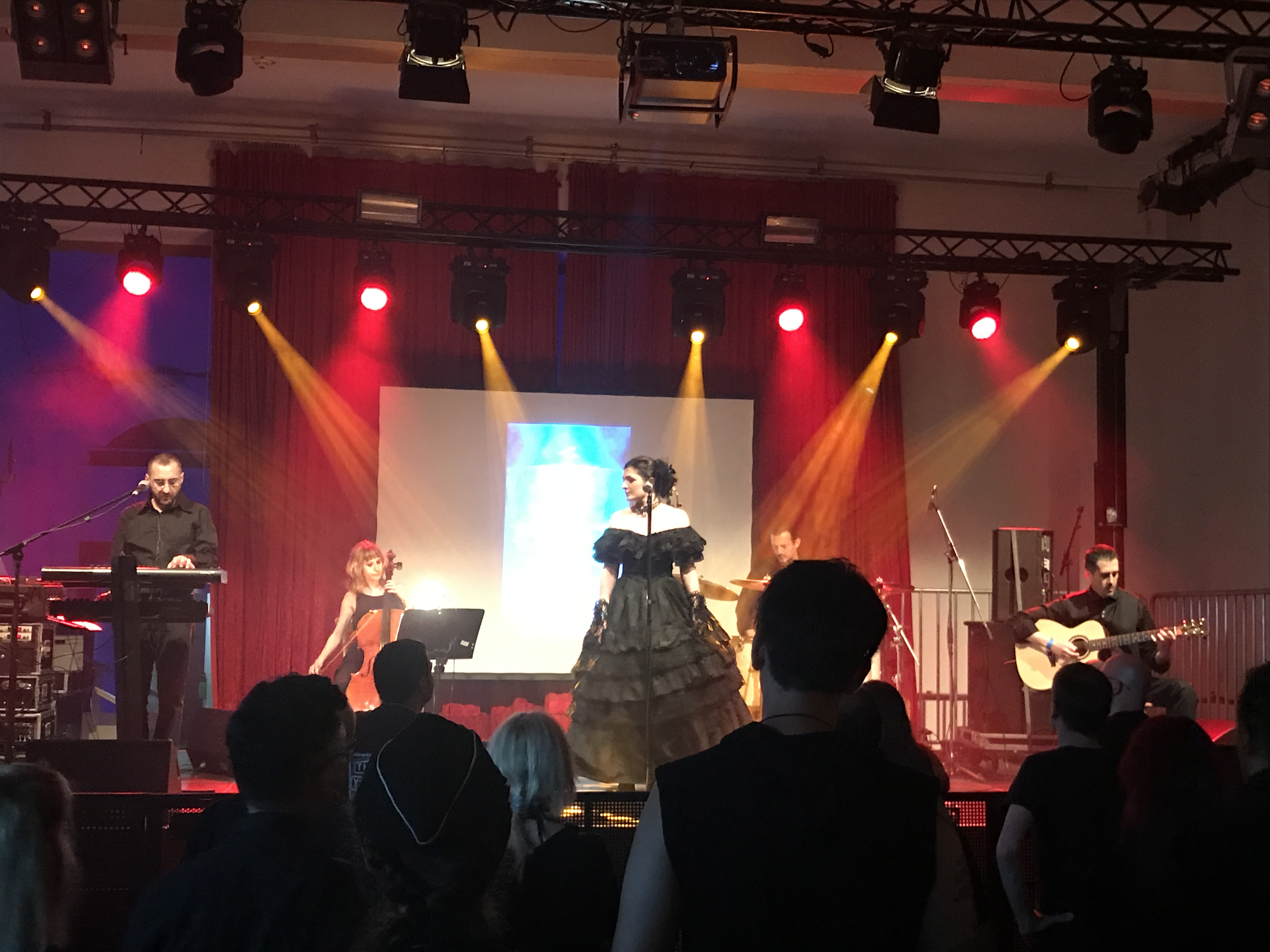
- Hautville - during a concert in 2017

Background information
- Origin: Basilicata, Emilia-Romagna
- Genres: Neofolk, progressive rock
- Years active: 2006-active
- Members: Leonardo Lonigro; Francesco Dinnella; Simona Bonavita
- Website: http://www.hautville.com/

Hautville is a progressive neofolk music project that was formed in 2006 by Leonardo Lonigro (guitars) and Francesco Dinnella (keyboards and vocals) who had already played together in some progressive rock bands. Simona Bonavita (vocals) later joined the project.

The mainly acoustic project combines European neofolk elements with Italian progressive rock. The lyrics are about traditional doctrines and folk traditions, that are seen as a collection of ancient knowledge.

The name Hautville (from Altavilla) takes its inspiration from the Norman-Swabian Middle Age.

Hautville's debut CDR No Milk For Babies was released in 2010 by Invisible Eye Productions. A year later, a collection of remastered songs from No Milk for Babies and three new unpublished songs were released on the Numen Lumen (3) album by Hau Ruck!SPQR. The album features lyrics from Giordano Bruno, Giuliano Kremmerz, and Domenico Bellocchio and is produced by Diego Banchero from Egida Aurea and Il segno del comando.

In 2013 the band released Le Moire (the Moirai) EP by SPQR featuring a guest appearance from pianist Arturo Stàlteri, co-founder of the Italian progressive rock band Pierrot Lunaire who played piano on two songs; one of which, Caelum et Terra, was played on Rai Radio 3 during the radio show Battiti. This new album was inspired by Greek mythological figures. Neo-progressive elements are evident in this release, and it is becoming increasingly important, proven by the fact that one of the tracks is a cover song by Banco del Mutuo Soccorso called Non mi rompete. Le Moire was released the same day the band performed in 2013 at Wave Gotik Treffen in Leipzig.

During 2013 and 2014, Hautville performed at various European locations and festivals supporting the American folk band Changes in Wien.

Recording on a band's new album took place from mid 2015 until early 2016. Mater Dolorosa was released in May 2016. The album blends the neofolk genre with progressive-folk elements in an orchestral arrangement, with thanks to the appearances from numerous classical guest musicians.

== Lineups ==
=== Current lineup ===
Leonardo Lonigro – guitars

Francesco Dinnella – keyboards, backing vocals

Simona Bonavita – lead vocals

=== Additional Members ===
Arturo Stàlteri, piano (Le Moire; Mater Dolorosa)

William Matteuzzi, tenor [vocal], (Mater Dolorosa)

Mirko Lucchini, cover paintings (Mater Dolorosa)

Rebecca Dallolio, violin (Mater Dolrosa)

Daniela Caschetto, cello (Mater Dolorosa)

Giulio Amico Padula, trumpet (Mater Dolorosa)

David Bisetti, drums (Mater Dolorosa)

Roberto Sivilia, artwork (Mater Dolorosa)

Paolo Bitonto drums (Numen Lumen; Le Moire)

== Discography ==
=== Studio albums ===
No milk for babies (CDR - Invisible Eye Production - 12 tracks, 2010)

Numen Lumen (Digipack-CD - HR!SQPR - 10 tracks, 2011)

Le Moire (Digipack-CD - SPQR - 5 tracks, 2013)

Mater Dolorosa (Digipack-CD - 8 tracks, 2016)

=== Compilations ===
Per aspera ad astra (CD - HR!SQPR – 13 tracks, 2011)
