= Heroes (Mark O'Connor album) =

Studio album by Mark O'Connor
- Released: 1993
- Recorded: Various; mainly in 1992
- Genre: Country
- Length: 66:21
- Label: Warner Bros.
- Producer: Mark O'Connor, Jim Ed Norman

Mark O'Connor chronology
Johnny Appleseed (1992)	Heroes (1993)	The Night Before Christmas (1993)

Professional ratings
Review scores
Source	Rating
Allmusic	4.5/5 stars

Heroes is an album by Mark O'Connor, in which he plays duets alongside his childhood fiddle heroes, including Jean-Luc Ponty, Benny Thomasson, Byron Berline, Stéphane Grappelli, Johnny Gimble, and others. It crosses a variety of musical genres and contains recordings made from 1976 to 1992.

== Track listing ==
No.	Title	Writer(s)	Length
1.	"New Country"	Jean-Luc Ponty	3:54
2.	"The Devil Comes Back to Georgia"	Charlie Daniels	4:13
3.	"Fiddlin' Around"	Johnny Gimble	4:49
4.	"Gold Rush"	Bill Monroe	4:36
5.	"House of the Rising Sun"	Traditional	7:52
6.	"Diggy Diggy Lo"	J. D. Miller	2:48
7.	"Sweet Jole Blon"	Doug Kershaw	2:21
8.	"Sadness/Darlin' Waltz"	Traditional	2:51
9.	"Jerusalem's Ridge"	Bill Monroe	3:27
10.	"Sally Johnson"	Traditional	5:09
11.	"Ashokan Farewell"	Jay Ungar	4:52
12.	"This Can't Be Love"	Richard Rodgers, Lorenz Hart	5:27
13.	"Ain't Misbehavin'"	Thomas Waller, Harry Brooks, Andy Razaf	5:30
14.	"Nomad"	L. Shankar, Caroline Shankar	8:00

== Personnel ==
- Mark O'Connor - fiddle

On New Country:

- Jean-Luc Ponty - fiddle

On The Devil Comes Back to Georgia:

- Charlie Daniels - fiddle
- Johnny Cash - Vocals
- Marty Stuart - Vocals
- Travis Tritt - Vocals

On Fiddlin' Around:

- Johnny Gimble - fiddle

On Gold Rush:

- Byron Berline - fiddle
- Bill Monroe - Mandolin

On House of the Rising Sun:

- Vassar Clements -fiddle

On Diggy Diggy Lo:

- Doug Kershaw
- Lionel Cartwright
- Clinton Gregory

On Sweet Jole Blon:

- Doug Kershaw - fiddle

On Sadness/Darlin' Waltz:

- Buddy Spicher - fiddle

On Jerusalem's Ridge:

- Kenny Baker - fiddle

On Sally Johnson:

- Terry Morris - fiddle
- Texas Shorty - fiddle
- Benny Thomasson - fiddle

On Ashokan Farewell:

- Pinchas Zukerman - fiddle

On This Can't Be Love:

- Stéphane Grappelli - fiddle

On Ain't Misbehavin':

- Stéphane Grappelli - fiddle

On Nomad:

- L. Shankar - 10-string double fiddle

also

- Mark O'Connor - Producer
- Mark O'Connor - Mixer
- Rob Feaster - Mixer for tracks 2,6, and 7
- Mark O'Connor - Music Editing
- Denny Purcell - Mastering
- Craig Miller - Executive Producer
- Laura LiPuma-Nash - Art Direction/Design
- Kip Lott - Photography/Background Painting
- Jonita Aadland - Additional Photos
- Jim Dant - Gold violin

== Chart performance ==
Chart (1993)	Peak position
U.S. Billboard Top Country Albums	46
U.S. Billboard Top Heatseekers	14
