= Hot Swing Trio: Live in New York =

Live album by Mark O'Connor's Hot Swing Trio
- Released: September 27, 2005
- Recorded: September 21 and 22, 2004
- Venue: Merkin Hall, New York
- Genre: Jazz
- Length: 59:52
- Label: OMAC
- Producer: Mark O'Connor

Mark O'Connor's Hot Swing Trio chronology
Hot Swing Trio: In Full Swing (2003)	Hot Swing Trio: Live in New York (2005)

Hot Swing Trio: Live in New York is the third and final album by Mark O'Connor's Hot Swing Trio. It was recorded during live performances in Merkin Hall in New York City on September 21 and 22, 2004. The seventh track, "Fiddler Goin' Home", was written in memory of Claude "Fiddler" Williams, who died in 2004.

== Track listing ==
All tracks not written by O'Connor were arranged by him.

1. "Fascinating Rhythm" (George Gershwin) – 5:30
2. "Cherokee" (Ray Noble) – 5:10
3. "Anniversary" (O'Connor) – 11:16
4. "Ain't Misbehavin'" (Harry Brooks, Fats Waller) – 8:04
5. "M&W Rag" (O'Connor) – 5:11
6. "Funky Swing" (O'Connor) – 6:31
7. "Fiddler Going Home" (O'Connor) – 4:24
8. "Gypsy Fantastic" (O'Connor) – 5:21
9. "Don't Get Around Much Anymore" (Duke Ellington) – 3:07
10. "Tiger Rag" (traditional) – 5:12

== Personnel ==
- Mark O'Connor – violin
- Frank Vignola – guitar
- Jon Burr – bass
