= Forrest O'Connor =

American singer-songwriter

- Forrest O'Connor in Nashville, TN. Photo by David Bean, 2016.

Background information
- Born: Elijah Forrest O'Connor; April 1, 1988 (age 38); Nashville, Tennessee, U.S.
- Origin: Nashville
- Genres: Singer-songwriter; Folk; Pop; Americana; Bluegrass; Country
- Occupation: Singer-songwriter
- Years active: 2014–present
- Label: Rounder Records
- Website: www.forrestoconnormusic.com

Forrest O'Connor (born April 1, 1988, in Nashville, Tennessee) is a Grammy Award-winning singer-songwriter, mandolinist, and guitarist. He is the son of violin virtuoso and composer Mark O'Connor and Suzanne MacKillop. He has also been the co-lead singer and writer for the Americana/bluegrass band, O'Connor Band (later called the Mark O'Connor Band), whose album, Coming Home, debuted at No. 1 on the Billboard Top Bluegrass Albums chart in August 2016. O'Connor has recorded with Paul Simon, Zac Brown, Clint Black, and Kenny Loggins, among others.

== Early life ==
O'Connor grew up in Nashville, Tennessee. His father, Mark O'Connor, was a session musician throughout the 1980s and early 1990s and recorded with Johnny Cash, Bob Dylan, Jimmy Buffett, Hank Williams, Jr., Dolly Parton, and many others. In 2000, O'Connor moved to Missoula, Montana with his mother. Inspired by the progressive bluegrass band Nickel Creek's debut album, he started teaching himself how to play the mandolin. While a student at Hellgate High School (2002–06), he wrote for his local newspaper, The Missoulian, and placed second in the Newspaper Association of America's national journalism competition. He graduated in 2006 from Hellgate High School as his class Valedictorian.

That fall, O'Connor enrolled at Harvard University. He began performing frequently on campus and around Boston in a folk duo with classmate Jim Shirey as well as in a bluegrass quartet called The Hay Brigade. Early appearances included a live spot on Public Radio International's "The World" and a campus arts festival with Harvard's president, Drew Faust, and actor John Lithgow in attendance. O'Connor was inducted into Phi Beta Kappa and awarded a Thomas T. Hoopes Prize for his senior thesis on acoustic instrument design. He graduated from Harvard summa cum laude with a B.A. in sociomusicology.

== Career ==
After launching the webcasting company Concert Window with fellow Harvard graduate Dan Gurney in 2010, O'Connor joined several Boston-based bands and, for the next three years, was an in-demand sideman, session musician, and backup vocalist. In 2014, he moved to Nashville and worked as a session player and sideman and sat in regularly with the country house band at The Station Inn. In March 2014, he won the Tennessee State Mandolin Championship. Shortly thereafter, he made his Grand Ole Opry debut accompanying singer-songwriter Mary Gauthier. That year, as part of a duo called Wisewater, he released an EP entitled The Demonstration, which debuted at #13 on the iTunes Singer-Songwriter chart in November 2014. He toured nationally with Wisewater in 2015, sitting in with and opening for a range of artists including Emmylou Harris, Ricky Skaggs, Suzy Bogguss, Sam Bush, and Gauthier. Late that year, Wisewater became absorbed into the O'Connor Band featuring Mark O'Connor.

O'Connor appeared on the final episode of the fourth season of ABC's hit series Nashville in May 2016, performing mandolin, acoustic guitar, and electric guitar behind Chris Carmack's character, Will Lexington. The O'Connor Band released its debut full-length album, Coming Home, in August 2016 on Rounder Records, and it reached No. 1 on the Billboard Top Bluegrass Albums chart. The album remained in the top 10 for most of the rest of 2016 and was hailed by No Depression as "a stunning debut".

There are some albums that are so sonically gorgeous, they sound as if the music has arrived from another plane; the players are so connected to each other, weaving their own parts so tightly together, the sound encloses you in its warmth and beauty...The twelve songs on Coming Home display the elegance, polished style, and supple songwriting of a group that's been playing together for years...Every song on Coming Home is a treasure.

— No Depression

Hours after the O'Connor Band performed at the Premiere Ceremony of the 59th Annual Grammy Awards on February 12, 2017, Coming Home won the Grammy Award for Best Bluegrass Album.

The O'Connor Band played at major festivals and performing arts centers throughout 2017–18, developing a reputation for stylistic versatility as well as virtuosic singing and instrumental playing. They have also appeared with the Nashville Symphony, Del McCoury, Bela Fleck, and the Zac Brown Band.

In 2025, O'Connor launched an Americana duo project called Rosine with his wife, Meredith Lane O'Connor.

== Personal life ==
O'Connor married singer-songwriter Meredith Lane in July 2025. His third cousin is American swimmer and Olympic gold medalist Katie Ledecky.

== Awards ==
Year	Nominee / work	Award	Result
2017	Coming Home	Best Bluegrass Album	Won
