= Midnight on the Water =

Midnight on the Water may refer to:

- Midnight on the Water (David Bromberg album), 1975
- Midnight on the Water (Mark O'Connor album), 1998
