= In Full Swing =

In Full Swing may also refer to:

- In Full Swing (Mark O'Connor album), 2003
- In Full Swing (Seth MacFarlane album), 2017
- In Full Swing, album by Czech band Malignant Tumour
- "In Full Swing", 1993 single B-side by Ronny Jordan
