= Jon Burr =

American double bass player and author

- Born: May 22, 1953 (age 73); Huntington, New York, U.S.
- Genres: Swing jazz
- Occupations: Musician, author
- Instrument: Double bass
- Member of: Mark O'Connor's Hot Swing Trio
- Website: jonburr.com

Jon Burr (born May 22, 1953, in Huntington, New York) is an American double bass player and author. He is a member of "Mark O'Connor's Hot Swing Trio", a swing jazz trio, along with Mark O'Connor and Frank Vignola. The trio has recorded three albums, Hot Swing! (2001), In Full Swing (2003), and Live in New York (2004).

== Biography ==
Burr studied double bass at a summer program at the Berklee College of Music in 1969 before attending the University of Illinois from 1970 to 1975. He was also a student of Clem DeRosa, and during this time played with Jim McNeely and the Warren Covington-led Tommy Dorsey Orchestra. Burr relocated to New York City in 1975, and there played with Steve Grossman, Buddy Rich, Ted Curson, Art Farmer, Lee Konitz, Chet Baker, Horace Silver, and Stan Getz in the latter half of the 1970s.

Burr played with Tony Bennett from 1980 to 1985 and also recorded with Jon Hendricks in the early 1980s. From 1986 he performed with Stephane Grappelli on Grappelli's tours of the United States, continuing in this role until the violinist's death. In the 1990s Burr worked extensively with Dorothy Donegan and also played with Roland Hanna and Eartha Kitt. Jon was a founding member of Mark O'Connor's Hot Swing Trio, from 1998 to 2006. In 2010, Burr founded the trio Music of Grappelli with violinist Jonathan Russell and guitarist Howard Alden, and the Jon Burr Big Band. From 2011 to 2015, Burr toured and recorded with the Manhattan Jazz Quintet. In 2013, Burr founded the Jon Burr Quintet.

Also an arranger and composer, he founded the musical services website Arranger for Hire. His web consulting and media production business jbQ Media has been in existence since 1996.

Burr has published three books, The Untold Secret to Melodic Bass in 2009, and The Improvising Chef in 2010, and Letting Go: Practical Meditation for Everyday People in 2011. In October 2015, Burr played bass in the musical show Mr. Lucky: The Songs of Henry Mancini, by Bistro Award-winning vocalist Jeff Macauley, with pianist and arranger Tex Arnold.

== Discography ==
=== As leader ===
- In My Own Words (Cymekob Records, 1996)
- 3 for All (Sir Roland Hanna, Bucky Pizzarelli) (Cymekob Records, 1997)
- Just Can't Wait (jbQ Media, 2007)
- Very Good Year (Jon Burr Quintet) (jbQ Media, 2015)

=== As sideman ===
With Chet Baker

- As Time Goes By (Timeless, 1986)
- Cool Cat (Timeless, 1986 [1989])

With Vic Juris

- Roadsong (Muse, 1978)

With Stephane Grappelli & Yo-Yo Ma

- Anything Goes (CBS, 1989)
