= Maggie O'Connor =

American singer-songwriter

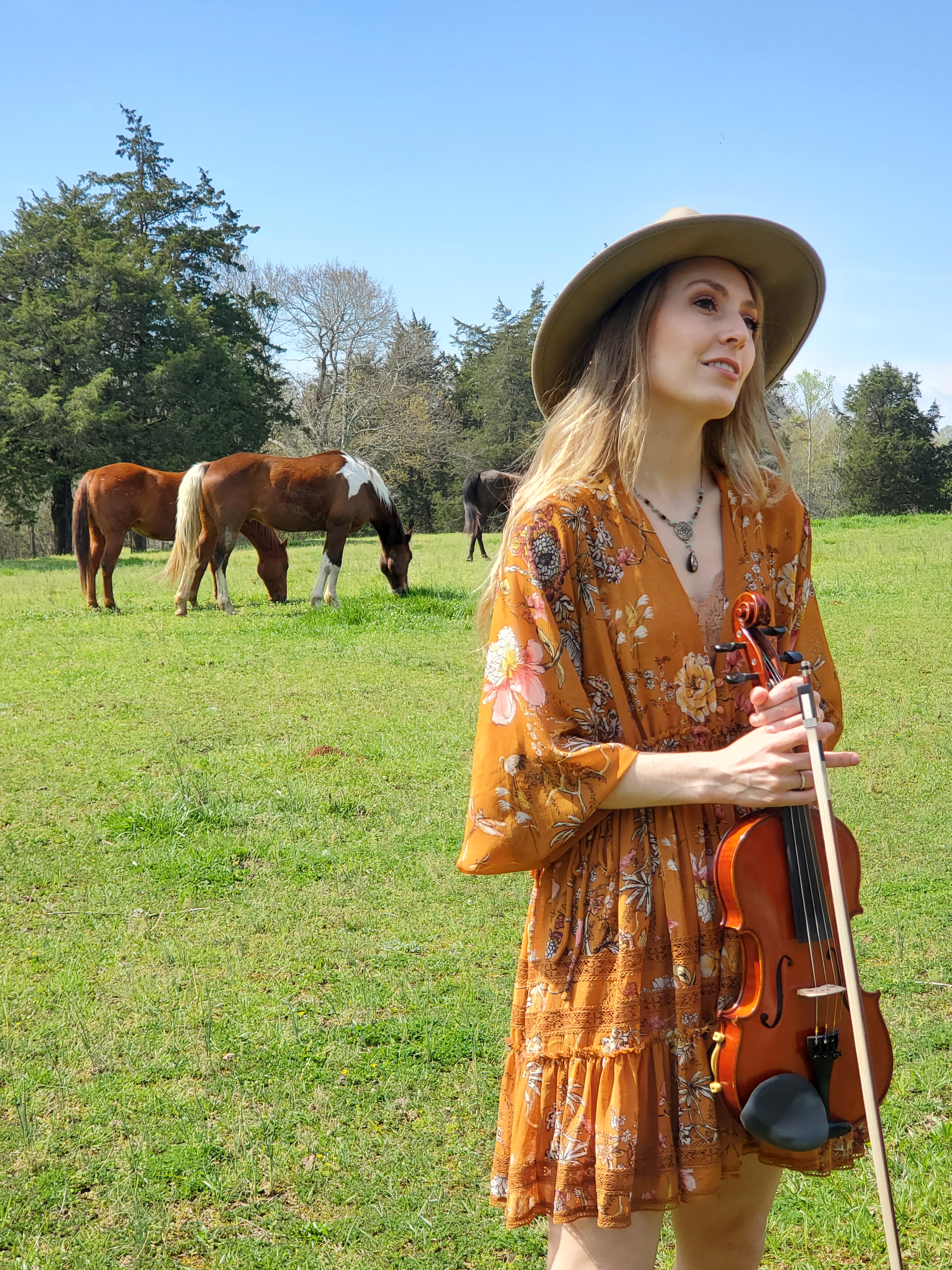
Maggie O'Connor
- Born: Maggie Dixon; February 16, 1991 (age 35)
- Genres: Country, bluegrass, folk
- Occupation: Musician
- Instruments: Violin, vocals
- Spouse: Mark O'Connor (m. November 8, 2014-Present)
- Website: maggieoconnorviolin.com

Maggie O'Connor (nee Dixon) is a Grammy-winning American violinist and singer. She is married to Mark O'Connor, with whom she has performed and recorded since 2014, both as a contributor, duo, and in the O'Connor Band. She graduated from the Peabody Conservatory in 2014. As a member of the O'Connor Band, she performed for the 59th Grammy Awards in 2017.

== Awards and honors ==
She won a Grammy in 2017 for her performance on the Coming Home (O'Connor Band album) along with her spouse and family in the O'Connor Band.

== Discography ==
- Duo (2015)
- Coming Home (O'Connor Band album)
- Life after Life (2024)
- A Christmas Duo (2025)
