= Crossing Bridges =

Live album by Mark O'Connor's Appalachia Waltz Trio
- Released: 2004
- Recorded: 2004
- Genre: Country
- Length: 73:55
- Label: OMAC Records
- Producer: Mark O'Connor

Mark O'Connor's Appalachia Waltz Trio chronology
Thirty-Year Retrospective (2003)	Crossing Bridges (2004)	Double Violin Concerto (2005)

Professional ratings
Review scores
Source	Rating
Allmusic	4.5/5 stars

Crossing Bridges is a live 2004 album by Mark O'Connor, Carol Cook, and Natalie Haas. It was recorded at May 22 - May 24 performances in Spivey Hall, Clayton College, and State University, Morrow, Georgia. It contains pieces written by O'Connor's for the earlier Appalachia Waltz and Appalachian Journey albums, as well as two new ones, "Olympic Reel (Medley)" and "Blackberry Mull". "Olympic Reel" was written for the 1996 Summer Olympics, and segues into a medley of the other fiddle tunes and styles of the trio member's cultures, Scottish, Irish, and Texan folk music. "Blackberry Mull" was based on an old folk song called "Blackberry Blossom". The songs arranged for violin, viola, and cello.

== Track listing ==
1. "Chief Sitting in the Rain/College Hornpipe" (traditional, arr. O'Connor) – 5:28
2. "Blackberry Mull" (O'Connor) – 8:02
3. "Appalachia Waltz" (O'Connor) – 7:22
4. "Old Country Fairy Tale" (O'Connor)– 9:30
5. "F.C.'s Jig" (O'Connor) – 3:20
6. "Poem for Carlita" (O'Connor) – 8:30
7. "Limerock" (traditional, arr. O'Connor) – 2:25
8. "Caprice for Three" (O'Connor) – 3:43
9. "Vistas" (O'Connor) – 10:24
10. "Olympic Reel (Medley)" (O'Connor) – 11:20

== Personnel ==
- Mark O'Connor - Violin
- Carol Cook - Viola
- Natalie Haas - Cello

also

- Paul Eachus - Recording
- Mark O'Connor - Mixing
- Mark O'Connor - Producer
