= The American Seasons =

Studio album by Mark O'Connor
- Released: 2001
- Recorded: 2001
- Genre: Classical
- Length: 60:14
- Label: Sony Classical
- Producer: Steven Epstein

Mark O'Connor chronology
Fanfare for the Volunteer (1999)	The American Seasons (2001)	Thirty-Year Retrospective (2003)

Professional ratings
Review scores
Source	Rating
Allmusic	4.5/5 stars

The American Seasons is an album by Mark O'Connor, recorded with the Metamorphosen Chamber Orchestra, conducted by Scott Yoo. It is composed of three original orchestral works by O'Connor. First is his piece for violin and orchestra, "The American Seasons" loosely structurally based upon Vivaldi's "The Four Seasons", and is conceptually a piece on American life, grounded in American folk music. "Strings & Threads Suite" follows, which traces O'Connor's "version of how folk music on the violin evolved in America" (liner notes) through thirteen pieces in progressively more modern styles. The album concludes with an arrangement of O'Connor's Appalachia Waltz, arranged for orchestra without soloist.

== Track listing ==
All music was written by Mark O'Connor.

1. "The American Seasons - Spring" – 7:39
2. "The American Seasons - Summer" – 9:41
3. "The American Seasons - Fall" – 5:50
4. "The American Seasons - Winter" – 14:36
5. "Strings & Threads Suite I. Fair Dancer Reel" – 1:17
6. "Strings & Threads Suite II. Sailor's Jig" – 0:48
7. "Strings & Threads Suite III. Captain's Jig" – 0:42
8. "Strings & Threads Suite IV. Off to Sea" – 0:56
9. "Strings & Threads Suite V. Pilgrim's Waltz" – 1:20
10. "Strings & Threads Suite VI. Road to Appalachia" – 0:57
11. "Strings & Threads Suite VII. Shine On" – 2:07
12. "Strings & Threads Suite VIII. Cotton Pickin' Blues" – 1:45
13. "Strings & Threads Suite IX. Pickin' Parlor Rag" – 1:03
14. "Strings & Threads Suite X. Queen of the Cumberland" – 1:13
15. "Strings & Threads Suite XI. Texas Dance Hall Blues" – 1:09
16. "Strings & Threads Suite XII. Swing" – 0:57
17. "Strings & Threads Suite XIII. Sweet Suzanne" – 1:15
18. "Appalachia Waltz" – 6:53

== Personnel ==
- Mark O'Connor - Violin
- Metamorphosen Chamber Orchestra
- Scott Yoo - Conductor

also

- Steven Epstein - Producer
- Richard King - Engineer
