= The Fiddle Concerto =

Studio album by Mark O'Connor
- Released: 1995
- Recorded: 1994
- Genre: Classical
- Length: 75:01
- Label: Warner Brothers
- Producer: Mark O'Connor

Mark O'Connor chronology
The Night Before Christmas (1993)	The Fiddle Concerto (1995)	Liberty! (1997)

Professional ratings
Review scores
Source	Rating
Allmusic	3/5 stars
The Strad	(measured favorable)

The Fiddle Concerto is an album by American musician Mark O'Connor. It contains two pieces written by O'Connor, the first of which is a violin concerto in American fiddle style, commissioned by the Santa Fe Symphony and premiered in 1993. The second piece is a string quartet for violin, viola, cello, and double bass commissioned by the Santa Fe Chamber Music Festival in 1990.

== Track listing ==
All music was written by Mark O'Connor.

1. "The Fiddle Concerto: I" – 13:07
2. "The Fiddle Concerto: Cadenza" – 4:53
3. "The Fiddle Concerto: II" – 12:58
4. "The Fiddle Concerto: III" – 5:45
5. "The Fiddle Concerto: Cadenza" – 8:26
6. "Quartet for Violin, Viola, Cello, and Doublebass: I" – 6:40
7. "Quartet for Violin, Viola, Cello, and Doublebass: II" – 8:21
8. "Quartet for Violin, Viola, Cello, and Doublebass: III" – 7:51
9. "Quartet for Violin, Viola, Cello, and Doublebass: IV" – 7:17

== Personnel ==
- Mark O'Connor - Violin
- Daniel Phillips - Viola
- Carter Brey - Cello
- Edgar Meyer - Double bass
- The Concordia Orchestra
- Marin Alsop - Conductor

also

- Mark O'Connor - Producer
- Craig Miller - Executive Producer
- Marc Aubort - Recording Engineer
