= Cool Cat (album) =

Studio album by Chet Baker
- Released: 1989
- Recorded: December 17–18, 1986
- Studios: Studio 44, Monster, Holland
- Genre: Jazz
- Length: 43:03
- Labels: Timeless; SJP 262
- Producers: Wim Wigt, Peter Huijts, Makoto Kimata, Mamoru Kamekawa

Chet Baker chronology
As Time Goes By (1986)	Cool Cat (1989)	Let's Get Lost (1987)

Cool Cat, (subtitled Chet Baker Plays, Chet Baker Sings) is an album by trumpeter/vocalist Chet Baker which was recorded in 1986 and released on the Dutch Timeless label.

== Reception ==
Professional ratings
Review scores
Source	Rating
AllMusic	3/5 stars

Steve Loewy of AllMusic states, "The tunes are just a tad different than usual, so Baker was forced to suspend his autopilot and dig in. Only partially satisfying, there are nonetheless enough worthwhile moments to recommend this one".

== Track listing ==
1. "Swift Shifting" (Harold Danko) – 7:25
2. "'Round Midnight" (Thelonious Monk, Cootie Williams) – 10:19
3. "Caravelle" (Jon Burr) – 5:53
4. "For All We Know" (J. Fred Coots, Sam M. Lewis) – 5:13
5. "Blue Moon" (Richard Rodgers, Lorenz Hart) – 6:32
6. "My Foolish Heart" (Victor Young, Ned Washington) – 7:41

== Personnel ==
- Chet Baker – trumpet, vocals
- Harold Danko – piano
- Jon Burr – bass
- Ben Riley – drums
