= Soppin' the Gravy =

Soppin' The Gravy

Studio album by Mark O'Connor
- Released: 1979
- Recorded: 1979
- Genre: Bluegrass
- Length: 32:44
- Label: Rounder
- Producer: Marty O'Connor

Mark O'Connor chronology
On the Rampage (1979)	Soppin' The Gravy (1979)	False Dawn (1982)

Professional ratings
Review scores
Source	Rating
AllMusic	4/5 stars

Soppin' the Gravy is an album by Mark O'Connor. It consists mostly of traditional Texas Fiddle music, with O'Connor's own piece, "Misty Moonlight Waltz", and an instrumental version of "Over the Rainbow". O'Connor can be seen on the cover with the white-painted fiddle that he used for competition. At the time of this album's release, O'Connor had won numerous fiddle championships, including a win in the National Old Time Fiddler's Contest Open division in 1979 and a 1975 win in the Grand Masters Contest in Nashville, Tennessee.

== Track listing ==
1. "Soppin' the Gravy" – 1:52
2. "Misty Moonlight Waltz" (O'Connor) – 3:15
3. "College Hornpipe" – 1:43
4. "Calgary Polka" – 1:15
5. "Morning Star Waltz" – 1:54
6. "Peaches 'N' Cream" – 1:58
7. "Skater's Waltz" – 2:34
8. "Tennessee Wagoneer" – 1:49
9. "Yellow Rose Waltz" – 1:58
10. "Medley: Speed the Plow/The Maid Behind the Bar (Judy's Reel)/Teatottler's Reel (Temperance Reel Or The Devil in Georgia)" – 1:58
11. "Jesse Polka" – 1:59
12. "The Dawn Waltz (Virginia Moonlight Waltz)" – 2:00
13. "Wild Fiddler's Rag" – 1:57
14. "Over the Rainbow" (instrumental) (Harold Arlen, Yip Harburg) – 3:42

== Personnel ==
- Mark O'Connor - fiddle, rhythm guitar
- Jerry Thomasson - (son of Benny Thomasson) - tenor guitar
- Buck White - mandolin

Technical

- Fred Cameron - recording engineer
- Bill Wolf - mixing engineer, mastering
- Marty O'Connor - executive producer
- Gail Lipson - photography
- Tim Garvin - cover design, calligraphy
