= Midnight on the Water (Mark O'Connor album) =

Studio album by Mark O'Connor
- Released: 1998
- Recorded: 1996
- Genre: Classical/Bluegrass
- Length: 69:43
- Label: Sony Classical
- Producer: Mark O'Connor

Mark O'Connor chronology
| Liberty! (1997) | Midnight on the Water (1998) | Fanfare for the Volunteer (1999) |

Professional ratings
Review scores
| Source | Rating |
|---|---|
| Allmusic | 4/5 stars |

Midnight on the Water is a solo classical/bluegrass album by Mark O'Connor. In it are six of his original caprices and four improvisations, as well as his arrangements of some traditional folk works.

The caprices are loosely based on Paganini's 24 Caprices for Solo Violin. They are in much the same spirit of technical difficulty - Mark O'Connor's word was that "This album easily represents my best playing on a recording." They contain many references to Paganini's Caprices, and draw upon O'Connor's repertoire of classic Texas fiddle motifs. In this, they represent a sort of bluegrass/classical virtuoso crossover, and a dedication to Paganini.

Midnight on the Water, the first part of the album's Track 17 medley, is a tune that Mark O'Connor's Texas mentor, Benny Thomasson, attributed to his father and uncle. It is somewhat of a dedication to Thomasson.

== Track listing ==
All tracks are traditional and arranged by O'Connor or original works by O'Connor, except as indicated.

1. "The Cricket Dance" (violin) – 1:40
2. "Caprice No. 1 in A Major" (violin) – 3:25
3. "Improvisation #1" (violin) – 2:53
4. "Caprice No. 2 in G Minor" (violin) – 3:02
5. "Follow the Scout" (mandolin) – 5:47
6. "Caprice No. 3 in A Major" (violin) – 4:35
7. "Improvisation #2" (violin) – 3:22
8. "Caprice No. 4 in D Major" (violin) – 2:29
9. "Fancy Stops and Goes" (guitar) – 3:48
10. "Improvisation #3" (violin) – 4:06
11. "Caprice No. 5 in F Major" (violin) – 2:41
12. "River Out Back" (mandocello) – 4:39
13. "Improvisation #4" (violin) – 5:20
14. "Caprice No. 6 in G Major" (violin) – 2:53
15. "Flailing" (guitar) – 6:31
16. "The Star-Spangled Banner" (violin) (Key) – 2:01
17. "Midnight on the Water/Bonaparte's Retreat" (violin) – 7:36
18. "Amazing Grace" (violin) (Newton) – 2:54

== Personnel ==
- Mark O'Connor - violin, guitar, mandolin, and mandocello; producer, editing and post-production
- Dave Sinko, assisted by Billy Saurel and Josh Sinko - Engineers
- Denny Purcell - Mastering
- Joel Zimmerman - Art Direction
- Hans Neleman - Photography
