= As Time Goes By (Chet Baker album) =

Studio album by Chet Baker
- Released: 1987
- Recorded: December 17–18, 1986
- Studio: Studio 44, Monster, Holland
- Genre: Jazz
- Length: 60:20
- Label: Timeless; SJP 251/252
- Producer: Wim Wigt, Peter Huijts

Chet Baker chronology
Chet in Chicago (1986)	As Time Goes By (1987)	Cool Cat (1986)

As Time Goes By, (subtitled Love Songs), is an album by trumpeter/vocalist Chet Baker which was recorded in 1986 and released on the Dutch Timeless label.

== Reception ==
Professional ratings
Review scores
Source	Rating
AllMusic	3/5 stars

Steve Loewy of AllMusic states, "While Baker's chops are clearly subpar there is a quaint romanticism to it all that somehow snares the listener. ... Baker is more than a bit muddled in his singing, sounding as though his mouth is filled with steel wool. Yet, the feelings he displays are so pure and touching that every note is imbued with deep emotion. Most of the songs are performed slowly, sometimes heart-wrenchingly so. While Baker seems tired, there is a cool, raw touch throughout, making this a decent example of the trumpeter's later playing. His range seems even more limited than usual, too. Danko is a thorough joy, and plays splendidly in support".

== Track listing ==
1. "You and the Night and the Music" (Arthur Schwartz, Howard Dietz) – 5:24
2. "As Time Goes By" (Herman Hupfeld) – 6:40
3. "My Melancholy Baby" (Ernie Burnett, George A. Norton) – 6:52
4. "I'm a Fool to Want You" (Jack Wolf, Joel Herron, Frank Sinatra) – 8:38
5. "When She Smiles" (Harold Danko) – 6:00
6. "Sea Breeze" (Jon Burr) – 6:54
7. "You Have Been Here All Along" (Burr) – 7:37
8. "Angel Eyes" (Earl Brent, Matt Dennis) – 6:04
9. "You'd Be So Nice to Come Home To" (Cole Porter) – 4:27
10. "'Round Midnight" (Thelonious Monk, Cootie Williams) – 7:33

== Personnel ==
- Chet Baker – trumpet, vocals
- Harold Danko – piano
- Jon Burr – bass
- Ben Riley – drums
