= Liberty! (album) =

Studio album by Mark O'Connor
- Released: 1997
- Recorded: 1997
- Genre: Country
- Length: 63:06
- Label: Sony
- Producer: Mark O'Connor

Mark O'Connor chronology
| The Fiddle Concerto (1994) | Liberty! (1997) | Midnight on the Water (1998) |

Professional ratings
Review scores
| Source | Rating |
|---|---|
| Allmusic | 4/5 stars |

Liberty! is a 1997 album by Mark O'Connor, which comprises his soundtrack to the six-part PBS series Liberty!. The album is composed mostly of period songs arranged by O'Connor, with the exception of "Freedom" and the theme for the series, written by O'Connor, entitled "Song of the Liberty Bell".

== Track listing ==
All tracks except for "Freedom" were arranged or written by Mark O'Connor.

1. "Song of the Liberty Bell" (folk version) – 5:45
2. "Johnny Has Gone for a Soldier" (traditional) (feat. James Taylor) – 2:56
3. "Surrender the Sword" (for violin and strings) – 9:24
4. "Soldier's Joy" (traditional) – 4:06
5. "When Bidden to the Wake or Fair" (William Shield) – 7:08
6. "The World Turned Upside Down" (traditional) – 2:45
7. "Bunker Hill" (Andrew Law) – 5:43
8. "Freedom" (Richard Einhorn) – 3:40
9. "The Flowers of Edinburgh" (traditional) – 4:15
10. "Brave Wolfe" (traditional) – 6:47
11. "Devil's Dream" (traditional) – 3:27
12. "Song of the Liberty Bell" (O'Connor) – 6:45

== Personnel ==
- Mark O'Connor - Violin
- James Taylor - Vocals, Guitar
- Yo-Yo Ma - Cello
- Wynton Marsalis - Trumpet

also:

- Mark O'Connor - Producer
- Laraine Perri - Executive Producer
- Dave Sinko, Charles Harbutt, Eric Prestige - Engineers
- Glenn Spinner, Tracy Hackney, Mark Wessel, Paul Falcone - Assistant Engineers
- Dave Sinko, Richard King - Mix Engineers
- Mark O'Connor - Editing and Additional Mixing
