= Kate Lee O'Connor =

American singer

- Born: Kate Lee Gurnow; Webster, New York
- Genres: Country, Americana, Bluegrass, Folk, Adult Contemporary, Pop
- Occupations: Musician, singer, violinist, songwriter
- Instruments: Vocals, Violin
- Labels: Compass Records, Rounder Records
- Member of: O'Connor Band
- Website: kateleeoconnor.com

Kate Lee O'Connor (born Kate Lee Gurnow on September 27, 1992, in Webster, New York) is a Grammy Award-winning singer, songwriter and fiddler. She is a co-lead singer, writer, and instrumentalist for the bluegrass band, O'Connor Band with Mark O'Connor, whose album, Coming Home, debuted at #1 on the Billboard Top Bluegrass Albums chart in August 2016. In 2019, she signed with Compass Records as half of the duo, O'Connor Lee, with Forrest O'Connor.

== Biography ==
O'Connor started playing violin at age nine. Her teachers exposed her to both classical and Americana fiddle music. At age eleven she was asked by Jack Metzger from the Fiddlers of the Genesee to form a group with him, "Kate Lee with No Strings Attached" in which she sang, played violin, and eventually performed her own original material. The band roster included Chuck Boda, Ben Ford, and John Irvine.

O'Connor attended Webster Schroeder High School and graduated magna cum laude from Belmont University in 2014. Soon after, she began touring with singer-songwriter Forrest O'Connor as a duo called Wisewater. In 2015, she founded the O'Connor Band with Forrest, Mark O'Connor, and Maggie O'Connor, and their album on Rounder Records, Coming Home, debuted at No. 1 on the Billboard Top Bluegrass Albums chart. Coming Home won the Grammy award for "Best Bluegrass Album" at the 59th Annual Grammy Awards in 2017.

In 2009, she was a winner of the Rochester Philharmonic Orchestra (RPO), Search for a Star competition, and her original song, "On Your Way," was orchestrated by director Jeff Tyzik.

She provided lead vocals and violin on two Mark O'Connor Band singles produced by Zac Brown, "In My Blood" written by Kalisa Ewing and Forrest O'Connor, and "Casino" written by Natalie Hemby. Mark O'Connor Band was the opening act for Zac Brown Band's "Down the Rabbit Hole" Tour in 2018.

== Recordings ==
- 2018 "Casino" single produced by Zac Brown for Mark O'Connor Band.
- 2018 "In My Blood (feat. Zac Brown)" single produced by Zac Brown for Mark O'Connor Band.
- 2017 O'Connor Band Live album
- 2016 O'Connor Band's Coming Home album with Rounder Records
- 2014 Wisewater's The Demonstration EP
- 2013 A Lonely Lullaby EP
- 2009 "When You Dream" single released for the Granting Dreams Foundation
- 2009 Kate Lee Live In Concert CD and Kate Lee Live On Stage DVD released featuring the live performance from PBS WXXI's television program, On Stage
- 2008 On Your Way CD released, featuring seven original songs & one live track from the Bluebird Café in Nashville, TN
- 2007 "In the Mirror" single released for The National Center for Missing & Exploited Children
- 2007 Are We There Yet? EP released
