= Vincenzo Caporaletti =

Italian musicologist

Vincenzo Caporaletti (born 1955) is an Italian musicologist known for devising audiotactile formativity theory.

== Career ==
Caporaletti was born in 1955 and raised in Roseto degli Abruzzi. He was a founding member of the Italian progressive rock group Pierrot Lunaire in the early 1970s, along with Arturo Stàlteri and Gaio Chiocchio. The first self-titled album. was released in 1974. From this year on, he started to dedicate his attention to the world of jazz, in particular in Rome, collaborating with musicians such as Tony Scott, Giulio Capiozzo and Jimmy Owens.

Caporaletti's research activity in musicology started at the end of the 1970s. One of his first researches was a reflection on the concept of Swing (jazz performance style), developed in his MA thesis taken at the University of Bologna. Inside this thesis he set the basis of the epistemological concept of audiotactility, that later has been defined Audiotactile Principle (ATP). On this concept, he built the framework of the Audiotactile Formativity Theory that introduced to musicology the category audiotactile music.

《Audiotactility》became an official scientific category in 2008 in Italy, when the Ministry of Education emanated the decrees MIUR 22/01/2008, n. 483/2008 and MIUR 03/07/2009, n. 124/2009, which established the new definition frameworks for the subjects taught in Conservatoires of music. These decrees set up two new subjects: "Discipline interpretative del jazz, delle musiche improvvisate e audiotattili" (Jazz, improvised and audiotactile music interpretative disciplines) identifyied with the code CODM/06; "Storia del jazz, delle musiche improvvisate e audiotattili" (History of jazz, improvised and audiotactile music). Caporaletti's works have been published in Italy, France, United Kingdom, Belgium and Brazil Audiotactile formativity theory has been discussed and recognised as a contribution in the study of improvised music by University researchers (Frank Tirro Laurent Cugny) and journalists (Fabio Macaluso, Maurizio Franco. Caporaletti's articles are also listed in Comparative Musicology website, an online bibliografical database

Caporaletti is the founder of the Ring Shout journal a scientific journal on African-American music. He is the director, along with Fabiano Araujo Costa and Laurent Cugny of the Revue du jazz et des musiques audiotactiles, edited by the IREMUS centre, Sorbonne University, Paris, France; of the collana Grooves - Edizioni di Musiche Audiotattili, published by the Italian editor LIM, Libreria Musicale Italiana, based in Lucca; and of collana Musicologie e Culture, published by the Italian editor Aracne based in Rome.

Caporaletti obtained the National Scientific Habilitation in Italy as Full Professor in Ethnomusicology. He teaches General Musicology and Transcultural Musicology at the University of Macerata in Italy. He is the director of CeIRM, (Centro Interuniversitario per la Ricerca Musicologica or Interuniversity Centre for Musicological Research) a research centre for musicology that groups together the University of Macerata, the Conservatory of Pescara and the Conservatory of Fermo. He has also taught Analysis of Performative and Compositional forms in Jazz Music at the Conservatorio di Musica "Santa Cecilia" in Rome.

== Audiotactile formativity theory ==
Starting from 2000, Caporaletti focused his research on the formalisation of a phenomenological and taxonomical model of musical experience, that, in his book, he has defined with the expression "audiotactile formativity". This model derives from a multidisciplinary reflection which starts from the analysis of the Groove (music) and swing phenomena and ending with a global perspective on the Musical improvisation. Caporaletti identifies with the term "Audiotactile music" those musical practices in which, on the one hand, the formativity of the musical text is fused with the musical actions performed by the musician in real time (Improvisation and/or extemporisation) and, on the other hand, are subjected to a process of phono-fixation through recording technologies. This category encompasses musical practices such as jazz, rock, rap, popular music, world music, Brazilian music and so on. In the precedent interpretative theories, they were identified as musical practices that belong to the written music tradition or the oral music tradition. Auditactile music theory categorises musical manifestations opposing the visual matrix to the audiotactile one, depending on the embedded cognitive work model required to perform or play that particular music, and not considering the sociological aspects of music making. Considered from a phenomenological point of view, the form, experience and musical concepts that belong to Western written musical tradition, spanning from 18th until the first half of the 20th century, are based on a "visual cognitive matrix" while the popular one on a "audiotactile cognitive matrix".

The conceptual framework of audiotactile formativity theory, or theory of the audiotactile music is composed of various pieces: the audiotactile principle [ATP], the neoauratic encoding [NAE], the swing-structure and the swing-idiolect. It is rooted on the philosophy developed by Luigi Pareyson, on the semiotics of Umberto Eco, on the anthropological concepts developed by Alan Merriam, on Marshall McLuhan's mediology and on the cognitive psychology of Michel Imberty. Audiotactile Music theory has its roots also in Neurosciences, using them in an athro-cognitive and anthro-cultural perspective for understanding musical experience, starting from the implications of perception and cognitive capacities through the factor constituted by cultural mediation. The distinction between the Audiotactile and Visual matrix, that looms at the bases of Audiotactile Theory, has been scientifically demonstrated.

This theory is employed as an alternative epistemological paradigm for the musicological studies in jazz, Brazilian music, progressive rock, world music, improvisational and contemporary music. It is at the centre of musicological debates in Italy, France and Brazil. The CRIJMA, Centre international de Recherche sur le Jazz et le Musiques Audiotactiles a centre for the study of Jazz and Audiotactile music, has been founded at the Sorbonne University in 2017. Audiotactile theory undermines and recontextualise the traditional conceptual frameworks of the problematics related to musical analysis, music notation, history of jazz, music ontology, music interaction, music teaching, copyrights and performative arts. SIAE has reviewed and updated the article n.33 if its statute on December 11, 2016, to include audiotactile music among the ones protected under copyright law. The Italian parliament, on the assembly of November 8, 2017, has added the term "audiotactile" to all the acts emanated in order to define more accurately the musical practices once defined only with the term "popular" or "folk" music.

== Selected publications ==
- Caporaletti, Vincenzo (2000). La definizione del swing. Il fondamento estetico del jazz e delle Musiche audiotattili. Teramo, Italy: Ideasuoni. ISBN 978-88-903155-0-3.
- Caporaletti, Vincenzo (2005). I processi improvvisativi nella Musica. Un approccio globale. Lucca: LIM. ISBN 978-88-7096-420-2.
- Caporaletti, Vincenzo (2007). Esperienze di Analisi del Jazz. Armstrong, Parker, Cesari, Monk, Mingus, Intra, Soft Machine. Lucca: LIM. ISBN 978-88-7096-500-1.
- Caporaletti, Vincenzo (2011). Jelly Roll Morton, the 'Old Quadrille' and 'Tiger Rag'. A Historiographic Revision. Lucca: LIM. ISBN 9788870966275.
- Caporaletti, Vincenzo (2014). Swing e Groove. Sui fondamenti estetici delle Musiche audiotattili. Lucca: LIM. ISBN 978-88-7096-778-4.
- Caporaletti, Vincenzo; Cugny, Laurent; Givan, Benjamin (2016). Improvisation, culture, audiotactilité. The Reinhardt, South, Grappelli Recordings of J.S. Bach's Double Violin Concerto : A Critical Edition. Lucca: LIM. ISBN 978-88-7096-840-8.
- Caporaletti, Vincenzo (2019). Introduzione alla teoria delle musiche audiotattili. Un paradigma per il mondo contemporaneo. Roma: Aracne. ISBN 978-88-255-2091-0.

== Discography ==
- Pierrot Lunaire (1974). Pierrot Lunaire (Vynil). Italy: IT, Rome. ZSLT 70025.

== On Audiotactile Theory ==
=== Books ===
- ARBO, Alessandro; BERTINETTO, Alessandro (2013). "Aisthesis". Aisthesis: Pratiche, Linguaggi e Saperi dell'estetico. Firenze University Press. ISSN 2035-8466.
- BERTINETTO, Alessandro (2016). Eseguire l'inatteso. Ontologia della musica e improvvisazione. Palermo: Il Glifo. ISBN 9788897527343.
- BETHUNE, Christian (2008). Le Jazz et l'Occident. Klincksieck. ISBN 978-2252036747.
- CHIANTORE, Luca (2014). Beethoven al pianoforte: Improvvisazione, composizione e ricerca sonora negli esercizi tecnici. Milano: Il Saggiatore. ISBN 9788865763940.
- D'ATTOMA, Donatello (2014). Charles Mingus: composition versus improvisation. lulu.com. ISBN 9781291839715.
- DE NATALE, Marco (2004). La musica come gioco. Il dentro e il fuori della teoria. Bern (CH): Peter Lang. ISBN 978-3039104840.
- FRANCO, Maurizio (2013). Oltre il mito. Scritti sul linguaggio jazz. Lucca: LIM. ISBN 9788870967104.
- INTRA, Enrico (2015). Audiotattile. Brugherio, Italy: Sinfonica Jazz Edizioni. ISBN 978-8884003300.
- MICHELONE, Guido (2004). Jazz in Europa. Forme, dischi, identità. Roma: Armando. ISBN 9788883585869.
- PASTICCI, Susanna (2008). Parlare di musica. Milano: Meltemi. ISBN 9788883536656.
- VERDENELLI, Marcello (2007). Dino Campana "una poesia europea musicale colorita". Macerata: EUM. ISBN 978-88-6056-039-1.

=== Articles ===
- ANGELERI, Claudio (2022) "Swing e groove. Sui fondamenti estetici delle musiche audiotattili di Vincenzo Caporaletti"Musica Jazz 03/09/2022
- BETHUNE, Christian (2004). "Le jazz comme oralité seconde". L'Homme (171–172): 171–172. doi:10.4000/lhomme.24969. ISSN 1953-8103.
- CARSALADE, Pierre (2010). "Christian Béthune, Le Jazz et l'Occident. Culture afro-américaine et philosophie". Gradhiva. Revue d'Anthropologie et d'Histoire des Arts. 11 (11): 229–230. doi:10.4000/gradhiva.1775. ISSN 1760-849X.
- CUGNY, Laurent (2017). "La Gaia Scienza". Musica Jazz. 800: 64–66. ISSN 0027-4542.
- DAMIANI, Paolo (2011). L'arte dell'improvvisazione. Un sapere mentre si fa. Franco Angeli. ISBN 9788856867053.
- DAMIANI, Paolo (2011). Jazz come processo interculturale. Vol. 2. Gangemi Editore. pp. 46–58. ISBN 9788849266146.
- FRANCO, Maurizio (2015). "Comprendere lo Swing? Oggi si può". Musica Jazz. 773: 16–18. ISSN 0027-4542.
- GARBUGLIA, Andrea (2007). Nelson Goodman e le tipologie. Verso una classificazione dei media statici e dinamici. Edizioni Nuova Cultura. ISBN 9788874621798.
- GOLDONI, Daniele (2015). Abitare l'improvvisazione. Bompiani. ISBN 9788858771990.
- MACALUSO, Fabio (17 July 2016). "Le musiche audiotattili: intervista a Vincenzo Caporaletti, grande musicologo". L'Espresso Online.
- MARINO, Gabriele (2013). Musichaosmos. Intersoggetività, gioco e costruzione nell'improvvisazione eterodiretta. Edizioni Nuova Cultura. pp. 101–110. ISBN 9788868121556.
- MICHEL, Philippe; LOIZILLON, Guillaume (26 May 2009). "Jazz et musique électroacoustique: Le rôle de la technique dans deux approches "audiotactiles" de la création musicale". Actes du Colloque Eurêka! (2).
- TIRRO, Frank (2009). "Reviewed Works: I processi improvvisativi nella musica (2005); Esperienze di analisi del jazz (2007) by Vincenzo Caporaletti". Il Saggiatore musicale. 16 (1): 174–175. JSTOR 43030018.

=== Other sources ===
- ARAUJO COSTA, Fabiano (13 February 2014). ""La mise en place de la notion pareysonienne de formativité dans la musicologie du jazz : l'approche analytique audiotactile de Caporaletti", Journées d'études doctorales sur les théories d'analyse, Conservatoire national supérieur de musique et Danse de Paris, 13/02/2014". Conservatoire de Paris. Conservatorie de Paris. Archived from the original on 2 July 2018.
- ARAUJO COSTA, Fabiano (23 January 2015). ""Groove et écriture dans une " relecture " de Toccata em ritmo de samba nº 2 (1981) de Radamés Gnattali ", Journée d'études: Brésil! Musique ancienne. Musique nouvelle, Groupe de recherche musique brésilienne - GRMB / IReMus, 23/01/2015 "". IREMUS. Sorbonne University.
- ARAUJO COSTA, Fabiano (16 January 2016). ""Musique brésilienne et le paradigme audio-tactile : Problématique générale et perspectives", Journée d'études musiques brésiliennes. Le savant, le populaire, le traditionnel, le folklore, Groupe de recherche musique brésilienne - GRMB / IReMus, 16/01/2016". IREMUS. Sorbonne University.
- BROWN, Steven. "Comparative Musicology". Comparative Musicology.
- CESTELLINI, Daniele (December 2017). "Review of I processi improvvisativi della musica reissue 2017". Blogfoolk.
- COTTI ZELATI, Claudia (1 August 2013). "L'Opera audiotattile- Carmelo Bene, Michelangelo Antonioni". Galatea.
- CUGNY, Laurent (4 June 2015). "Organisation de la Journée d'étude " La Théorie de la musique audiotactile "". IREMUS. Sorbonne University. Archived from the original on 3 November 2019.
