= Mark O'Connor =

American violinist and composer

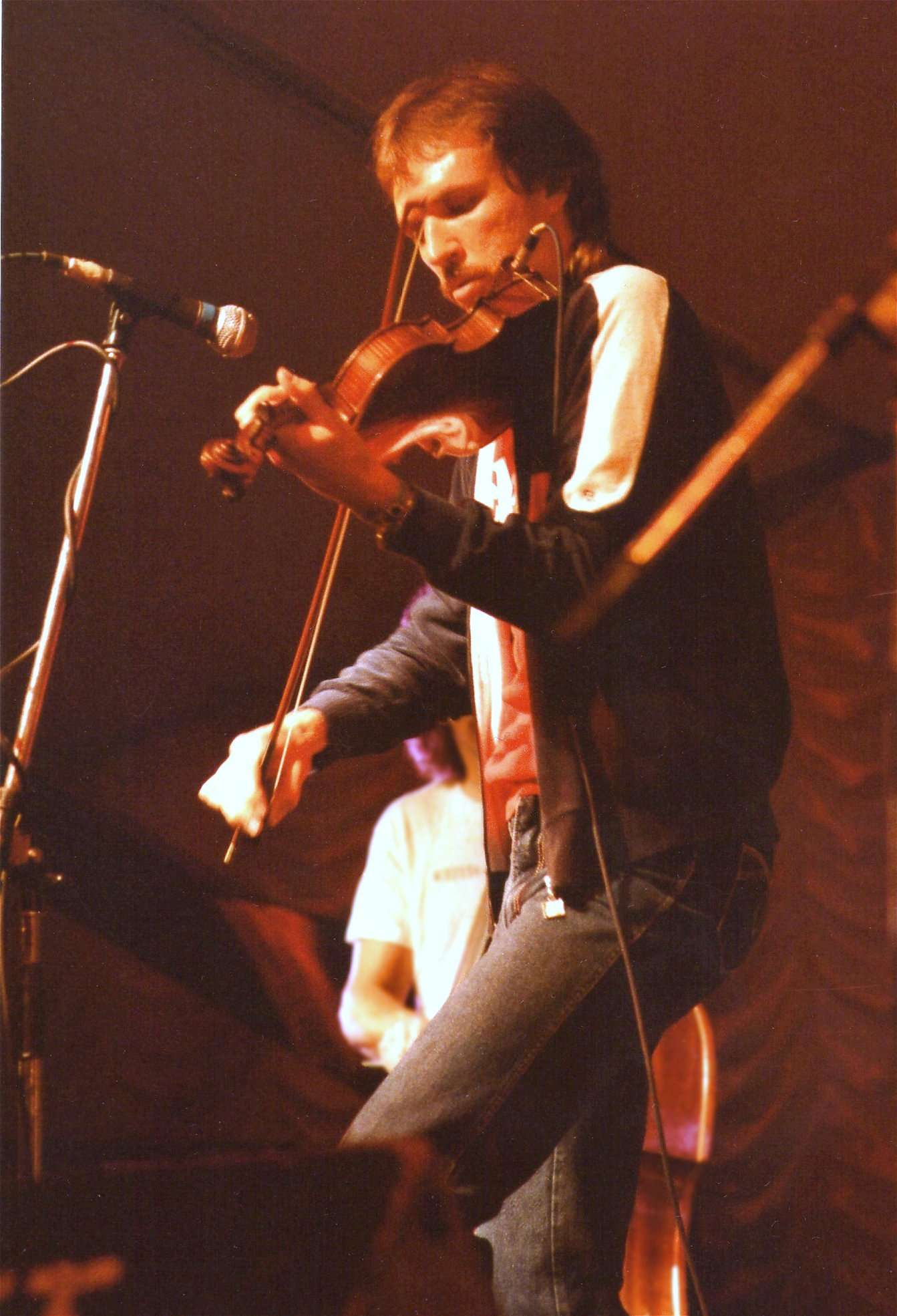
- O'Connor on stage at the 1985 Cambridge Folk Festival

Background information
- Born: August 5, 1961 (age 65); Mountlake Terrace, Washington, U.S.
- Genres: Country, bluegrass, jazz, classical
- Occupations: Musician, composer, teacher, author
- Instruments: Violin, fiddle, guitar, mandolin
- Years active: 1974–present
- Labels: Rounder, Warner Bros., Sony Classical Records
- Spouse(s): Maggie O'Connor (nee Dixon; m. November 8, 2014-Present)
- Partner: Suzanne MacKillop Sadie DeWall (2007-2013)
- Website: markoconnor.com

Mark O'Connor (born August 5, 1961) is an American fiddle player, composer, guitarist, and mandolinist whose music combines bluegrass, country, jazz and classical. A three-time Grammy Award winner, he has won six Country Music Association Musician Of The Year awards and was a member of three influential musical ensembles: the David Grisman Quintet, The Dregs, and Strength in Numbers.

O'Connor has released 45 albums, of mostly original music, over a 45-year career. He has recorded and performed mostly his original American Classical music for decades. An expert at traditionally-based fiddle and bluegrass music, he also plays other instruments proficiently, including the violin, guitar and mandolin. He has appeared on 450 albums, composed nine concertos and has put together groundbreaking ensembles. His mentors have included Benny Thomasson who taught O'Connor to fiddle as a teenager, French jazz violinist Stéphane Grappelli with whom O'Connor toured as a teenager, and guitarists Chet Atkins, Doc Watson and Steve Morse.

== Early life ==
O'Connor was born and raised in the suburb of Mountlake Terrace, Washington, where his father was a construction worker and his mother was a dance teacher. His mother insisted that he learn to play the guitar at the age of five and, by the age of ten had taught himself to play the Flamenco guitar. As an eight-year-old in 1969, O'Connor watched fiddle player Doug Kershaw perform the song "Diggy Liggy Lo" on The Johnny Cash Show, leaving such an impression on him that he begged his parents to purchase him a fiddle for the next three years before they finally gave him one for his eleventh birthday.

In 1973, O'Connor's mother drove him and his little sister from Seattle to Nashville, Tennessee, where a local friend suggested that he might be allowed to play at the Picking Parlour. His performance at the Picking Parlour left the local audience stunned that a twelve-year-old knew so many old-time fiddle songs. A couple of days later, he made his Grand Ole Opry debut, introduced by Roy Acuff, and became the youngest musician to sign a recording contract with Rounder Records.

O'Connor won national titles on the fiddle, guitar, and mandolin as a teenager. In 1975, at the age of thirteen, O'Connor won the WSM (AM), Tennessee, and Grand Ole Opry sponsored Grand Masters Fiddle Championships in Nashville, Tennessee, against amateur and professional competitors of all ages. That same year he won another national championship on acoustic guitar, at the National Flat Pick Guitar Championship in Winfield, Kansas.

After graduating from the Mountlake Terrace High School in 1979, O'Connor joined the David Grisman Quintet as the replacement for guitar player, Tony Rice, and went out on tour with Stephane Grappelli with whom he performed at Carnegie Hall when he was only seventeen-years-old. As a teenager, he was also a member of the seminal instrumental group The Dregs, previously known as Dixie Dregs. At age 19, He won the Buck White International Mandolin Championship in Kerrville, Texas. He is a four-time grand champion (1979, 1980, 1981 and 1984) at the National Oldtime Fiddlers' Contest in Weiser, Idaho. Several of his teenage albums are noteworthy and inspired a generation of young acoustic musicians, such as "Pickin' In The Wind", "A Texas Jam Session", "Markology" and "False Dawn".

== Musical career ==
O'Connor composes, arranges, and records American music in genres that include folk, classical, and jazz. His works include concertos, and compositions for orchestra, string quartets, string trios, choral music, solo unaccompanied pieces, folk and bluegrass ensemble and a symphony (see Compositions). After releasing six albums as a teen on Rounder Records, O'Connor signed a long term record deal with Warner Bros. Records in Nashville. He released a series of instrumental albums such as "Elysian Forest" and "On The Mark" as well as teaming up with Bela Fleck, Sam Bush, Jerry Douglas and Edgar Meyer for "Strength In Numbers". His first award winning albums that catapulted him into the international stage include "New Nashville Cats" and "Heroes" both released on Warner Bros.

O'Connor's "Fiddle Concerto (1992)", a violin concerto in American fiddle style commission by the Santa Fe Symphony Orchestra and Chorus, has been performed over 250 times, making it one of the most performed concertos written in the last 50 years. The recording of the concerto was conducted by Marin Alsop and "Concordia Orchestra".

In 1993, O'Connor teamed up with Charlie Daniels to record a sequel to Daniels' 1979 single "The Devil Went Down to Georgia" entitled "The Devil Comes Back To Georgia". O'Connor and Daniels recorded the song alongside Johnny Cash, Marty Stuart and Travis Tritt. The song was on O'Connor's album, Heroes. Between 1995 and 2000, O'Connor teamed up with Yo-Yo Ma and Edgar Meyer to release "Appalachia Waltz" and "Appalachian Journey" spending nearly 2 years at the top of the classical music Billboard charts.

In 1996, O'Connor composed The Olympic Reel for the closing ceremonies of the 1996 Summer Olympics in Atlanta, Georgia. It premiered in front of 100,000 people at Centennial Olympic Stadium, as well as 3.5 billion people from the television viewing audience.

In 1997, O'Connor and others composed and performed music based on folk melodies as arrangements for the American Revolutionary War-era Public Broadcasting Service documentary miniseries, Liberty! The American Revolution (the companion album is Liberty!). The theme music for the miniseries is O'Connor's Song of the Liberty Bell.

In 1999, he recorded his Fanfare For The Volunteer with the London Philharmonic Orchestra for Sony Classical, and one of his most critically acclaimed orchestral pieces American Seasons, which alludes to The Four Seasons (Vivaldi), for Sony Classical as well. "American Seasons", and his "Strings & Threads" Suite (1986) was performed by The Metamorphosen Chamber Orchestra in 2001 at the Great Performers concert at Lincoln Center for the Performing Arts.

In a review by The New York Times, "if Dvorak had spent his American leisure time in Nashville instead of Spillville, Iowa, his New World Symphony might have sounded like this." Both "Strings & Threads" Suite and "American Seasons" were recorded for the album The American Seasons, released in 2001 on the label OMAC Records. In 2008 O'Connor paired up with violinist Nadja Salerno-Sonnenberg to record his "Double Violin Concerto" with Marin Alsop and the Colorado Symphony Orchestra for OMAC Records.

Over a period of five years, O'Connor teamed up with jazz musicians Frank Vignola and Jon Burr for a trilogy of "Hot Swing Trio" albums dedicated to his mentor Stephane Grappelli. O'Connor recorded Thirty-Year Retrospective in 2003 with the mandolinist Chris Thile, guitarist Bryan Sutton, and bassist Byron House. It celebrates his thirty years as a recording artist on his own OMAC label. He also provided the soundtrack to a 30-minute animated film on the story of Johnny Appleseed (and released the music on his 1992 album Johnny Appleseed), narrated by Garrison Keillor. He contributed four tracks to a 1993 album on the theme of The Night Before Christmas, narrated by Meryl Streep.

His composition Appalachia Waltz (appearing on the album of the same title) has been adopted by Yo-Yo Ma as part of his live performance repertoire. One of his chamber music efforts is his piano trio entitled Poets and Prophets which is inspired by his boyhood hero Johnny Cash. O'Connor and Rosanne Cash united in double bill concerts for premiering their collaboration. The piece was recorded by the Eroica Trio.

On April 28, 2009, O'Connor teamed with chamber musicians Ida Kavafian, Paul Neubauer and Matt Haimovitz to present his second and third string quartets, amalgamating bluegrass with classical styles, at Merkin Concert Hall in New York. O'Connor released the recording for both string quartets under the label OMAC in May 2009.

In 2010, O'Connor released his "Americana Symphony" recorded by the Baltimore Symphony as well as his "Concerto No. 6 (Old Brass) and released on OMAC Records. In 2011, he released his unique "The Improvised Violin Concerto" on CD and DVD with the Boston Youth Symphony Orchestras. Partnering with his wife Maggie (who he married on November 8, 2014), his son Forrest, and his daughter-in-law, they recorded two band albums "Coming Home" for Rounder Records and "A Musical Legacy" for OMAC Records. He also recorded a duets album with Maggie featuring music from the O'Connor Method. Some of O'Connor's albums are or contain tributes to his musical mentors and inspirations, including Niccolò Paganini, Benny Thomasson, and Grappelli. He has recorded solo albums for OMAC Records, Rounder, Warner Bros. and SONY Classical Records.

== The O'Connor Method ==
O'Connor has developed a string instrument technique for music teachers and students, The O'Connor Method — A New American School of String Playing, in collaboration with Sadie DeWall and Pamela Wiley. The method places an emphasis on music and playing techniques from North America, in addition to focusing on rhythmic development, ear training, and improvisation.

The method is published as a series of books that also contains short essays about famous Americans who played fiddle, such as Johnny Gimble, Ray Nance, Byron Berline, Pinchas Zukerman, Eddie South, Kenny Baker, Benny Thomasson, Scott Joplin, Thomas Jefferson and Davy Crockett, and the history of a wide variety of music including jazz, bluegrass, Romani, western swing, cajun, blues, African American Spirituals, ragtime and Mariachi. Teacher training sessions based on the Method take place around the United States and in other countries including at O'Connor Method String Camps. The physical edition, which includes violin, viola, cello and orchestra method books, was released in 2010. In 2020, the books were released as a digital edition for download.

== Awards and honors ==
O'Connor won a Grammy Award three times: in 1991 for Best Country Instrumental Performance, The New Nashville Cats; in 2000 for Best Classical Crossover Album, Appalachian Journey with Yo-Yo Ma and Edgar Meyer; and in 2016 for Best Bluegrass Album, Coming Home by the O'Connor Band With Mark O'Connor.

He was named Musician of the Year by the Country Music Association six years in a row (from 1991–96). His collaborative single "Restless" (with Vince Gill, Ricky Skaggs and Steve Wariner) won the 1991 CMA Vocal Event of the Year award. O'Connor is 4-time National Old-Time Fiddler Champion, 3-time Grand Master Fiddler Champion, 2-time national guitar flatpick champion, and world mandolin champion, all achieved in his teens. He was inducted into The National Fiddler Hall of Fame in 2009.

== Discography ==
=== Albums ===
Year	Album	Peak United States Chart Positions							Label
Year	Album	Classical Crossover	Classical	Jazz	Country	Heatseekers	Bluegrass	Indie	Label
1974	National Junior Fiddling Champion								Rounder
1976	Pickin' in the Wind								Rounder
1978	Markology								Rounder
1979	On the Rampage								Rounder
1979	Soppin' the Gravy								Rounder
1982	False Dawn								Rounder
1982	Industry Standard (with The Dregs)								Arista
1985	Meanings Of								Warner
1986	Stone from Which the Arch Was Made								Warner
1988	Elysian Forest								Warner
1989	The Championship Years								CMF
1989	On the Mark								Warner
1990	Retrospective								Rounder
1991	The New Nashville Cats				44	14			Warner
1992	Johnny Appleseed								Rabbit Ears
1993	Heroes				46	14			Warner
1993	The Night Before Christmas								Rabbit Ears
1994	The Fiddle Concerto	6							Warner
1996	Appalachia Waltz (with Yo-Yo Ma and Edgar Meyer)		1						Sony
1997	Liberty!	8							Sony
1998	Midnight on the Water	5							Sony
1999	Fanfare for the Volunteer								Sony
2000	Appalachian Journey (with Yo-Yo Ma and Edgar Meyer)		1						Sony
2001	The American Seasons		6						Sony
2001	Hot Swing!								OMAC
2003	Thirty-Year Retrospective (with Chris Thile, Bryon Sutton)								OMAC
2003	Hot Swing Trio: In Full Swing			7					Sony
2004	Crossing Bridges		19						OMAC
2005	Hot Swing Trio: Live in New York			22					OMAC
2005	Double Violin Concerto (with Nadja Salerno-Sonnenberg)								OMAC
2006	Folk Mass (with Gloriae Dei Cantores)								OMAC
2007	The Essential Mark O'Connor								Sony
2008	Americana Symphony (Baltimore Symphony, Marin Alsop)								OMAC
2009	String Quartets No. 2 & 3								OMAC
2010	Jam Session								OMAC
2011	An Appalachian Christmas		9			5	3	39	OMAC
2012	American Classics								OMAC
2012	America On Strings								OMAC
2013	The Improvised Violin Concerto CD/DVD								OMAC
2014	MOC4								OMAC
2014	Mark O'Connor Christmas Tour Live DVD								OMAC
2015	Duo. (with Maggie O'Connor)								OMAC
2016	Coming Home						1		New Rounder
2019	A Musical Legacy						5		OMAC - 23
2021	Markology II						10		OMAC - 27
2024	Life After Life (with Maggie O'Connor)								OMAC-30

=== Singles ===
Year	Song	Chart positions		Album
Year	Song	US Country	CAN Country	Album
1991	"Restless" (Mark O'Connor and the New Nashville Cats (Note: The New Nashville Cats, as credited on "Restless", are Ricky Skaggs, Vince Gill, and Steve Wariner.))	25	19	The New Nashville Cats
1992	"Now It Belongs to You" (with Steve Wariner)	71	62	The New Nashville Cats
1994	"The Devil Comes Back to Georgia" (with Charlie Daniels, Travis Tritt, Marty Stuart, and Johnny Cash)	54	—	Heroes

=== Music videos ===
Year	Video	Director
1990	"Bowtie"	Gustavo Garzon
1991	"Restless" (with Steve Wariner, Ricky Skaggs and Vince Gill)	
1991	"Now It Belongs to You" (with Steve Wariner)	Gustavo Garzon
1993	"The Devil Comes Back to Georgia" (with Charlie Daniels, Johnny Cash, Travis Tritt and Marty Stuart)	Gustavo Garzon
1997	"Johnny Has Gone for a Soldier" (with James Taylor)	

== Personal life ==
Mark O'Connor was in a relationship with Suzanne MacKillop, with whom he had a son called Forrest. Forrest grew up in Nashville, but moved to Missoula, Montana, with his mother, Suzanne, when he was 12. Mark had a 7-year relationship with Sadie DeWall from 2007 to October 2013; Autumn was born to them in 2010. As of November 2014, Mark and Sadie were co-parenting Autumn. Mark met Maggie O'Connor (nee: Dixon) on May 15, 2014, and they were married 6 months later. They continue their personal and professional partnership until today.
