= In Full Swing (Hot Swing Trio album) =

Studio album by Mark O'Connor's Hot Swing Trio
- Released: 2003
- Recorded: 2002
- Genre: Swing Jazz
- Length: 57:15
- Label: Sony
- Producer: Steven Epstein, Mark O'Connor

Mark O'Connor's Hot Swing Trio chronology
Hot Swing! (2001)	In Full Swing (2003)	Hot Swing Trio: Live In New York (2005)

Professional ratings
Review scores
Source	Rating
Allmusic	4/5 stars
The Penguin Guide to Jazz Recordings	3/4 stars

In Full Swing is the sequel to Mark O'Connor's Hot Swing Trio's album Hot Swing!.

== Track listing ==
All songs except "One Beautiful Evening" were either written by or arranged by Mark O'Connor.

1. "In Full Swing" (O'Connor) – 3:55
2. "Honeysuckle Rose" (Thomas Waller, Andy Razaf, Harry Da Costa) – 5:14
3. "Tiger Rag" (D. James LaRocca, Edwin Edwards, Henry W. Ragas, Larry Shields, Anthony Sbararo, Harry Da Costa) – 5:20
4. "Misty" (Johnny Burke, Erroll Garner) – 6:56
5. "Stéphane and Django" (O'Connor) – 5:50
6. "Fascinating Rhythm" (George Gershwin, Ira Gershwin) – 3:46
7. "3 For All" (Burr) – 6:08
8. "As Time Goes By" (Herman Hupfeld) – 5:56
9. "Limehouse Blues" (Philip Braham, Douglas Furber) – 7:22
10. "One Beautiful Evening" (Vignola) – 6:48

== Personnel ==
- Mark O'Connor – Violin
- Frank Vignola – Guitar
- Jon Burr – Bass

with

- Wynton Marsalis – Trumpet
- Jane Monheit – Vocal

also

- Steve Epstein and Mark O'Connor – Producers
- Richard King – Recording Engineer
