= Pierrot Lunaire (band) =

- Origin: Italy
- Genres: Progressive rock; avant-prog; progressive folk
- Years active: 1974–1977
- Labels: IT Records
- Members: Gaio Chiocchio; Arturo Stalteri; Jacqueline Darby; Massimo Buzzi
- Past members: Vincenzo Caporaletti

Pierrot Lunaire was an Avant-prog/Progressive folk band from Italy.

The band formed in 1974 and was originally named Primtemps.

Two albums were released: a self-titled one in 1974 and Gudrun in 1976. They are quite different in style, the first being more based upon normal song structure though still being quite experimental, and the second being more free-form and experimental than the first. Gudrun is regarded as a classic by many fans of progressive rock.

The band appears on the Nurse with Wound list.

== Discography ==
- Pierrot Lunaire (1974)
- Gudrun (1976)
