= Santa Fe Symphony Orchestra and Chorus =

The Santa Fe Symphony Orchestra and Chorus is a professional full-sized orchestra with a volunteer chorus located in Santa Fe, New Mexico. The orchestra performs regularly at the Lensic Theater in Santa Fe.

== Beginnings ==
The Santa Fe Symphony was founded by local musicians under the direction of General Director Gregory W. Heltman. The Symphony did their first performance on September 2, 1984, at a free concert held at St. Francis Auditorium in Santa Fe. That initial concert included a Rossini overture, Handel’s Water Music, and Beethoven's Symphony No. 2. Donations totaled $1,800, which were later supplemented by further contributions. The Chorus of Santa Fe (The Santa Fe Symphony Chorus) was founded five years earlier in 1979 and merged with the symphony in 1986. Choral director Dr. Linda Raney came on board in 1997.

Since then, The Santa Fe Symphony has offered orchestral and choral concerts, as well as education and outreach programs for adults and school children. Performing a regular subscription series at the 790-seat Lensic Theater, Santa Fe's Performing Arts Center, The Santa Fe Symphony is recognized as a community-focused musical organization. It is one of two fully professional, full-sized symphony orchestras in the state.

== Merger plans ==
In March 2024, the Santa Fe Symphony announced plans to merge with the Santa Fe Youth Symphony Association.
