= Frank Vignola =

American jazz guitarist

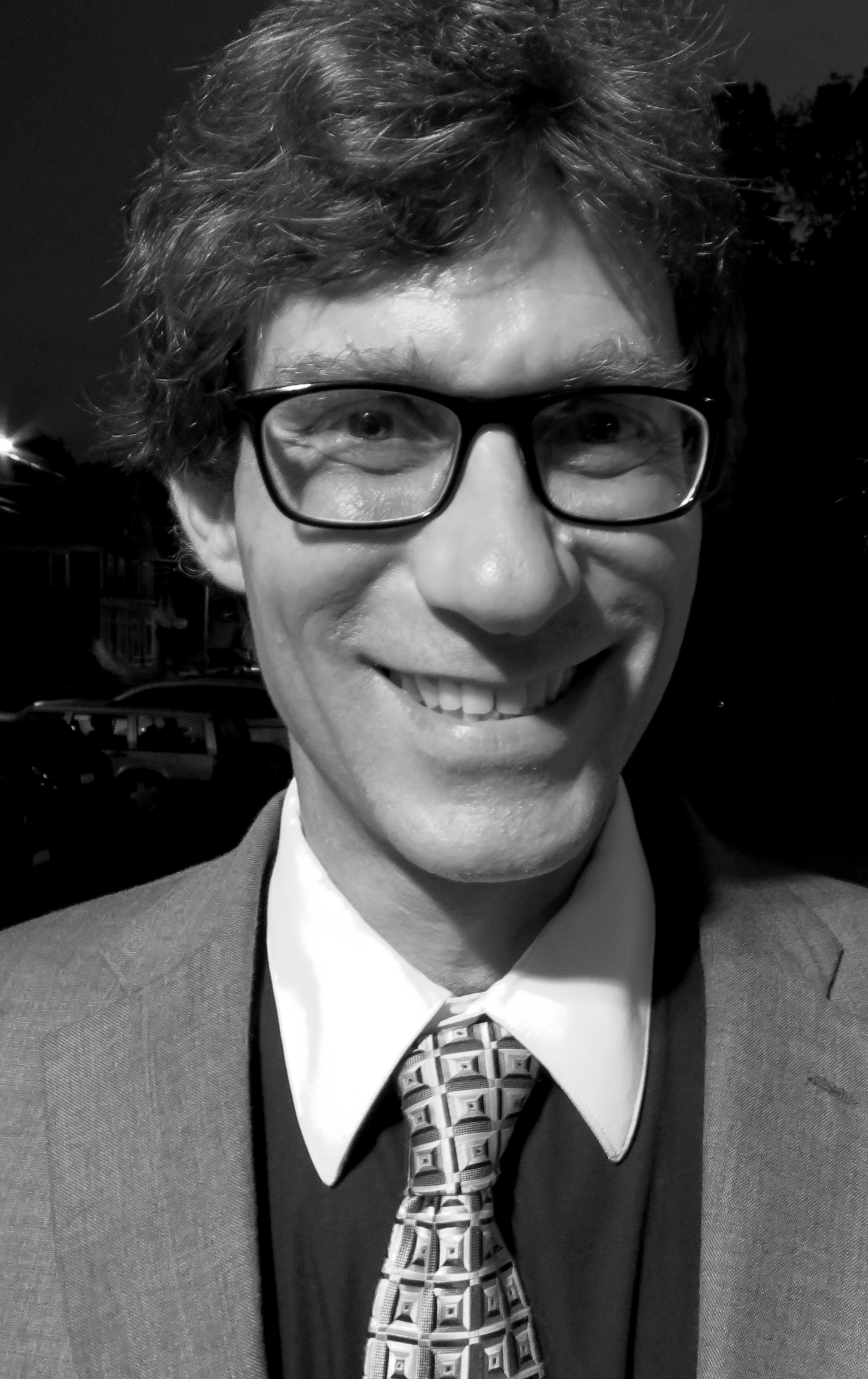
- Vignola in 2014

Background information
- Born: December 30, 1965 (age 60); West Islip, New York, U.S.
- Genres: Jazz, jazz fusion, gypsy jazz, swing, pop, classical
- Occupations: Musician, composer, arranger, producer, author
- Instruments: Guitar, banjo
- Years active: 1979–present
- Labels: Concord Jazz, Acoustic Disc, Jazzology, Mel Bay, Azica
- Website: FrankVignola.com

Frank Vignola (born December 30, 1965) is an American jazz guitarist. He has played in the genres of swing, fusion, gypsy jazz, classical, and pop.

== Career ==
Vignola grew up on Long Island, New York. His father played accordion and banjo and his brother plays trumpet. When he was five, he picked up the guitar, learning from his father and from records by Django Reinhardt, Bucky Pizzarelli, Joe Pass, and Johnny Smith. At 12 he started on the banjo, and two years later he won a national championship in Canada.

On Long Island, he studied guitar at the Cultural Arts Center. Early in his career, he went to used record stores to buy albums by musicians whose work he didn't know, so that he could study their music.

In 1987, when he was 23, he formed the Hot Club Quintet, named after the Quintette du Hot Club de France. In the early 1990s, he was in New York City, playing in groups with Max Morath, Andy Stein, Herman Foster, Joe Ascione, and tuba player Sam Pilafian. He formed the Concord Jazz Collective with veteran guitarists Howard Alden and Jimmy Bruno. The roster of musicians he has worked with includes Leon Redbone, Ken Peplowski, Susannah McCorkle, Charlie Byrd, Joey DeFrancesco, Gene Bertoncini, Johnny Frigo, Bucky Pizzarelli, Wynton Marsalis, David Grisman, Jane Monheit, Mark O'Connor, Pasquale Grasso, and Donald Fagen.

He has written over fifteen instructional books for Mel Bay, produced several instructional DVDs, and teaches courses on the internet. He appeared on the PBS television programs Tommy Emmanuel and Friends and Four Generations of Guitar.

In May 2017, Frank Vignola was in a serious ATV accident when he was thrown into a tree and sustained many injuries. In November 2017, friend and fellow guitarist Tommy Emmanuel posted an update on Vignola's status, stating that he would be unable to play the guitar and may only recover after many surgeries and a long period of physical therapy. However, as of May 2018 he had recovered and was again performing.

== Discography ==
=== As leader ===
- Appel Direct (Concord Jazz, 1993)
- Makin' Whoopee with Sam Pilafian (Telarc, 1993)
- Let It Happen (Concord Jazz, 1994)
- Concord Jazz Guitar Collective with Howard Alden, Jimmy Bruno (Concord Jazz, 1995)
- Cookin' with Frank and Sam (Concord Jazz, 1995)
- Look Right, Jog Left (Concord Vista 1996)
- Deja Vu (Concord Vista, 1999)
- Django Lives with Hot Club USA (Koch, 1999)
- Without a Doubt with Joe Ascione, Mark Egan, Frank Wess (Koch, 2000)
- Off Broadway (Nagel-Heyer, 2000)
- Autumn Leaves at Astley's with Gene Bertoncini (True Track, 2001)
- Hot Swing! with Mark O'Connor (OMAC, 2001)
- Blues for a Gypsy (Acoustic Disc, 2001)
- Meeting of the Grooves with Gene Bertoncini (Azica, 2002)
- Stringin' the Blues: A Tribute to Eddie Lang with Bucky Pizzarelli, Howard Alden, Al Viola, Marty Grosz (Jazzology, 2003)
- Moonglow with Bucky Pizzarelli (Hyena, 2005)
- Vignola Plays Gershwin (Mel Bay, 2006)
- MaMaVig with Jamie Masefield, Gary Mazzaroppi (self-produced, 2007)
- The Living Room Sessions with David Grisman (Acoustic Disc, 2007)
- Standards (Self-Released, 2009)
- Just Between Frets with Tommy Emmanuel (Solid Air, 2009)
- Gypsy Grass with The Vignola Collective (Dare, 2009)
- 100 Years of Django (Azica, 2010)
- Jam Session with Mark O'Connor, Chris Thile (OMAC, 2010)
- An Evening With... with Vinny Raniolo (2011)
- Jersey Guitar Mafia (Showplace Music Productions, 2011)
- First Time Together! with David Grisman, Martin Taylor (Acoustic Disc, 2012)
- Beloved Earth Songs with Vinny Raniolo (2013)
- Swing Zing! with Vinny Raniolo (2015)
- Frank 'n' Dawg: Melody Monsters with David Grisman (Acoustic Disc, 2017)

=== As sideman ===
With Leon Redbone

- Sugar (Private Music, 1990)
- Up a Lazy River (Blue Thumb, 1992)
- Whistling in the Wind (Private Music, 1994)
- Any Time (Blue Thumb, 2001)
- Live October 26, 1992 the Olympia Theater Paris, France (Rounder, 2005)

With others

- Karrin Allyson, Fujitsu-Concord 27th Jazz Festival (Concord 1996)
- Charlie Byrd, Du Hot Club de Concord (Concord, 1995)
- John Bunch, Plays the Music of Ivring Berlin (Except One) (Arbors, 2008)
- John Bunch, Do Not Disturb (Arbors, 2010)
- Alexis Cole & Bucky Pizzarelli, A Beautiful Friendship (Venus, 2015)
- Joey DeFrancesco, Joey DeFrancesco's Goodfellas (Concord Jazz, 1999)
- Empire Brass, Braggin' in Brass (Telarc, 1991)
- Vincent DiMartino, Allen Vizzutti, Bobby Shew, Trumpet Summit (Summit, 1995)
- Peter Ecklund, Peter Ecklund and the Melody Makers (Stomp Off, 1988)
- Peter Ecklund, Strings Attached (Arbors, 1996)
- Tommy Emmanuel, Tommy Emmanuel & Friends Live from the Balboa Theatre (KPB 2011)
- Tommy Emmanuel, Accomplice One (CGP, 2018)
- Lars Erstrand, Beautiful Friendship (Sittel, 1992)
- Donald Fagen, Morph the Cat (Reprise, 2006)
- Johnny Frigo, Johnny Frigo's DNA Exposed! (Arbors, 2001)
- David Grisman, At Jazz Alley (Acoustic Disc, 2008)
- Marty Grosz, Marty Grosz and the Keepers of the Flame (and the Imps) (Stomp Off, 1987)
- JaLaLa, That Old Mercer Magic! (Dare, 2009)
- Jon-Erik Kellso, Chapter I (Arbors, 1993)
- Barbara Lea, Bob Dorough, Dick Sudhalter, Hoagy's Children: Songs of Hoagy Carmichael Volume One (Audiophile, 1994)
- George Masso, Dan Barrett, Let's Be Buddies (Arbors, 1994)
- Susannah McCorkle, From Broadway to Bebop (Concord Jazz, 1994)
- Jane Monheit, The Lovers, the Dreamers and Me (Concord 2008)
- Jane Monheit, Home (EmArcy, 2010)
- Mark O'Connor, In Full Swing (Odyssey, 2003)
- Mark O'Connor, Live in New York (OMAC, 2005)
- Orphan Newsboys, Laughing at Life (Stomp Off, 1991)
- Bucky Pizzarelli, Don't Blame Me (Acoustic Disc, 2007)
- Bucky Pizzarelli, So Hard to Forget (Arbors, 2008)
- Nicki Parrott, Sentimental Journey (Venus, 2015)
- Nicki Parrott, Yesterday Once More: The Carpenters Song Book
- Sam Pilafian, Travelin' Light (Telarc, 1991)
- Andy Stein, Goin' Places (Stomp Off, 1987)
- Dick Sudhalter, Melodies Heard...Melodies Sweet (Challenge, 1999)
- Lucy Woodward, Hooked! (Verve, 2010)
