= Benny Thomasson =

American musician

- Born: April 22, 1909; Winters, Texas
- Died: January 14, 1984 (aged 74); Ellis County, Texas
- Genres: Old-time fiddle
- Occupation: Auto body mechanic
- Instruments: Fiddle
- Years active: 1928–1984

Benny Thomasson (April 22, 1909 – January 1984) was an American fiddler in the Texas style of fiddling.

Thomasson was born in Winters, Texas, and raised in Gatesville, one of 10 children in a family where music was not only encouraged, it was a key ingredient of life. His parents were Lewis Alexander and Sarah Elizabeth Wright Thomasson. The elder Thomasson played fiddle, as did his brother Ed, Benny's uncle. Thomasson began fiddling at age five. His father wrote the well-known fiddle tune titled "Midnight on the Water". The boys were influenced by renowned fiddlers such as Eck Robertson and Lefty Franklin, friends of the Thomasson family.

Thomasson entered his first fiddle contest in the late 1920s, at age 19, thinking he was pretty good. He was disappointed that he placed near 60th place. After that, he decided that the tunes needed to be "rounded out, and smoothed up" .

Thomasson worked hard and took home many trophies. He won several contests multiple times, including the Texas State Championship 15 times, the World Championship three times in a row (1955, 1956 and 1957, where he was the first out of three to do so), and the National Old-time Fiddlers Championship. He improved and improvised on many simple traditional tunes. He practiced and developed controlled improvisation, keeping the tune true to its melody while embellishing and expanding that melody.

Benny had a brief brush with Hollywood when he was cast in the 1976 film "Stay Hungry". In the film, a bodybuilder (Arnold Schwarzenegger) wants to learn to play the fiddle, and seeks lessons from an old master (Thomasson). Jeff Bridges, Sally Field, Joanna Cassidy, Ed Begley Jr., and Robert Englund are also in the cast. Fiddling legend Byron Berline (then living in Los Angeles) was engaged by the producers to provide music for the film, and was considered for the part as the fiddle mentor. However, Berline was too youthful and athletic (he played for the University of Oklahoma football team) to fit the part, and he suggested Thomasson. Thomasson and his wife, Bea, attended the screening of the movie, but walked out before the end, embarrassed by racier parts of the film.

In 1928, Thomasson married Beatrice "Bea" Hollander, in Taos, New Mexico. They had four children. Thomasson spent most of his life working at an auto body shop in Dallas, but the Thomassons moved to Washington state in the early 1970s to be nearer their son Dale. Thomasson died in 1984 in Ellis County, Texas.

== Discography ==
- Texas Hoedown (County 703) - 1965
- Country Fiddling From the Big State (County 724)~ 1970
- Dudley Hill - Guitar: From a Northern Family (Voyager CD 317) early 1970s, re-released 2002
- Oldtime Fiddling and Other Folk Music (Weiser, Idaho Chamber of Commerce) 1972
- The Weiser Reunion (Voyager VRCD 309) 1972
- Oldtime Fiddling and Other Folk Music (Weiser, Idaho) 1973
- A Jam Session With Benny and Jerry Thomasson (Voyager VRLP 309) ~1973
- Texas Fiddle Legends Benny Thomasson and Dick Barrett (Yazoo 517, VHS video) recorded early 1970s, released late 1990s
- Say Old Man Can You Play the Fiddle (Voyager VRCD 345) recorded informally on March 3, 1974, re-released 1999
- Tenino Old Time Music Festival: 1970 - 1978 Fiddle Tunes and Other Instrumentals (Voyager CD 367) - 2005
