= Nonesuch Records discography =

This is a Nonesuch Records discography, organized by catalog number.

== Catalog number legend ==
1. 71xxx = Nonesuch
2. 72xxx = Explorer Series
3. 73xxx = Multiple Sets
4. 7-xx = Special Albums
5. 78xxx = Silver Series
6. 79xxx = Digital Series
7. Following the five-digit 79xxx series, Nonesuch begins a non-sequential, six-digit numbering system

== Discography ==
=== Nonesuch ===
- H 71001 CLAUDE LE JEUNE; Chants de Is Renaissance
- h 71002 THE BAROQUE TRUMPET Corelli, Purcell, etc.
- H 71003 HANDEL: The Dettingen Te Deum
- H 71004 AN 18th-CENTURY CONCERT Bach, Telemann, Vivaldi, etc.
- H 71005 ALBINONI: Adagio for Strs & Organ; 3 Ctos
- h 71006 HINDEMITH: Str Qt No 2/MALIPIERO: Rispetti e strambotti
- h 71007 RAVEL/DEBUSSY Str Qts
- h 71008 BACH: "Coffee" Cantata, BWV 211; "Peasant" Cantata, BWV 212
- h 71009 SYMPHONIES & FANFARES FOR THE KING'S SUPPER
- h 71010 MASTERPIECES OF THE EARLY FRENCH & ITALIAN RENAISSANCE
- H 71011 BACH: Magnificat in D, BWV 243; Cantata, BWV 51
- H 71012 COURT & CEREMONIAL MUSIC OF THE EARLY 16th CENTURY
- H 71013 HANDEL: 4 Concertos with Oboe & Str Orch
- H 71014 THE LEGACY OF THE MANNHEIM SCHOOL
- H 71015 HAYDN: Sym No. 6 (Morning); No. 7 (Noon), No. 8 (Night)
- H 71016 MUSIC FROM THE CHAPEL OF PHILIP If OF SPAIN
- h 71017 STdLZEL/TELEMANN: Concertos
- h 71018 VIVALDI: Concertos; Suite
- H 71019 BACH: 4 Ctos for Harpsichords & Orch
- H 71020 FRENCH ORGAN MASTERPIECES OF THE 17th & 18th CENTURIES
- H 71021 MONTEVERDI: Lamento d'Arianna/Lagrime d'amante/Ecco Silvio
- H 71022 VIVALDI: Concertos
- H 71023 RAMEAU: La Guirlande
- H 71024 HAYDN: Cto for Organ; 2 Nocturnes; Sinf Concertante
- H 71025 BEETHOVEN: Trio, Op 87; Sextet, Op 71 (Winds)
- H 71026 O GREAT MYSTERY
- H 71027 PURCELL: Sonata for Tpt; Suites; Pieces for Harpsichord
- H 71028 MOZART: Cto for 2 Pianos, K. 365; Cto for 3 Pianos, K. 242
- H 71029 BACH: Cantatas, BWV 140 & 57
- h 71030 IBERT/GLAZOUNOV/VILLA-LOBOS Works for Saxophone, Ch Orch
- H 71031 HAYDN: Sym No 31 (Hornsignal), No. 19, No. 45 (Farewell)
- H 71032 HAYDN: Sym No 49 (La Passions), No. 44 (Trauer), Armida Overture
- H 71033 POULENC: Sonatas for Clar & Oboe; Aubade
- H 71034 C.P.E. BACH: 6 Sonatas for Flute & Harpsichord
- h 71035 MOZART: String Quartets, K. 575 & K. 499
- H 71036 FRENCH DANCES OF THE RENAISSANCE
- H 71037 F. COUPERIN: Harpsichord Works
- H 71038 TELEMANN: Works for Flute & Harpsichord
- H 71039 CEREMONIAL MUSIC OF THE FRENCH BAROQUE
- H 71040 CHARPENTIER: Music for Port-Royal; First Tenebrae Lesson
- H 71041 MOZART: Coronation Mass, K. 317; Vesperae Solennes, K. 339
- H 71042 VIVALDI: 6 Ctos for Flute, Strings, Continue
- H 71043 PERGOLESI: La Serva Padrona
- H 71044 SCHUMANN: KonzertstOcke (4 Hns & Orch, Op 86; Piano & Orch, Op 92)
- H 71045 HAYDN: Sonatas for Flute & Piano
- H 71046 MOZART: Divertimento in B flat for Hns & Strs, K. 287
- H 71047 MOZART: Sym No 40, K. 550; Sym in D (aft Ser No 9, Posthorn, K. 320)
- H 71048 TINCTORIS: Missa Trium Vocum
- H 71049 HAYDN: Divertimenti for Baryton, Via, Cello
- H 71050 SHOSTAKOVICH/R. STRAUSS: Sonatas for Cello & Piano
- H 71051 MUSIC FROM THE CHAPEL OF CHARLES V
- H 71052 VIVALDI/A. SCARLATTI/TELEMANN/GEMINIANI: Concerti Grossi
- H 71053 LASSO: Prophetiae sibyllarum; Missa Ecce nune
- H 71054 BEETHOVEN. Quintet for Piano & Winds, Op 16; Wind Octet, Op 103
- H 71055 MOZART: Sym No 23, K. 181; No 29, K. 201; No 30, K. 202
- H 71056 MOZART: Vln Ctos, No 3, K. 216; No 4, K. 218
- H 71057 BACH: Ctos (3 Vlns, aft BWV 1064; Fl, Vln, Hps, BWV 1044)
- H 71058 MUSIC FROM THE COURT OF BURGUNDY
- H 71059 MOZART: Piano Ctos, No 18, K. 456; No 24, K. 491
- H 71060 BACH: Metals, BWV 227, 229, 226
- H 71061 TELEMANN: Sonatas & Trios
- H 71062 SCHOTZ: Metals from Cantiones sacrae (1625)
- H 71063 RAMEAU: Pieces de clavecin an concert (1741)
- H 71064 BAROQUE MUSIC FOR RECORDERS
- H 71065 TELEMANN: Chamber Music with Recorder
- H 71066 TELEMANN: 4 Ctos (Tpt; Hns; Oboe d'amore; Vln)
- H 71067 HAYDN- 2 Ctos for Flute, Oboe, & Orch (Nos 1 & 5)
- H 71068 MOZART: Concertone for 2 Vlns, K. 190; Symph Concertante, K. 297b
- H 71069 JAZZ GUITAR BACH
- H 71070 VIVALDI: The Four Seasons
- H 71071 HAYDN/BOCCHERINI: Cello Concertos
- H 71072 MOZART: Piano Ctos, No 20, K. 466; No 23, K. 488
- h 71073 LITURGICAL MUSIC FROM THE RUSSIAN CATHEDRAL
- H 71074 MOZART: Clarinet Cto, K. 622; Sinf Concertante, K. 364
- H 71075 MILITARY FANFARES, MARCHES, & CHORUSES FROM THE TIME OF NAPOLEON
- H 71076 J. STAMITZ: Sym in A/MOZART: Divertimento in D, K. 136
- H 71077 VIVALDI: Concertos; Sonatas (Wind Quartet)
- H 71078 TELEMANN: Suites; Concertos (Ch Orch)
- H 71079 MOZART: Sym No 35 (Haffner), K. 385; No 38 (Prague), K. 504
- H 71080 MUSIC OF THE FRENCH BAROQUE
- H 71081 CHORAL SONGS OF THE ROMANTIC ERA
- H 71082 CHARPENTIER: Christmas Oratorio
- H 71083 HAYDN: Sym No 26 (Lamentatione), No 12, No 83 (La Poule)
- H 71084 ISAAC: Missa Carminum/DESPREZ: Ave Christe/LASSO: Motels
- H 71085 TRIO SONATAS OF THE LATE BAROQUE
- H 71086 LAUDARIO 91 D1 CORTONA (The Nativity/The Passion)
- H 71087 BERWALD: Sym in G min (86rieuse); Sym in C (Singuli6re)
- H 71088 VIVALDI: Cantatas, Sonatas
- H 71089 ROSSINI: Sine of My Old Age (excerpts)
- H 71090 MONTEVERDI. 11 Combattimento di Tancredi e Clorinds,
- H 71091 THE SPLENDOR OF BRASS
- H 71092 MONTEVERDI: 11 Bello delle Ingrate
- H 71093 STRAVINSKY: The Rite of Spring; 4 Eludes for Och
- H 71094 D. SCARLATTI: 16 Sonatas for Harpsichord
- H 71095 RENAISSANCE CHORAL MUSIC FOR CHRISTMAS
- H 71006 HAYDN: Sym No 39, No 3, No 73 (La Chasse)
- H 71097 RENAISSANCE VOCAL MUSIC
- H 71098 FOUR CENTURIES OF MUSIC FOR THE HARP
- H 71099 MENDELSSOHN: Cto for 2 Pianos & Orch; Fair Melusina Overture
- H 71100 MASTER WORKS FOR ORGAN, Vol 1
- H 71101 HAYDN: Syrn No 21, No 48 (Maria Theresia), No 82 (L'Ours)
- H 71102 MOZART: Divertimento for String Trio in E flat, K. 563
- H 71103 CALDARA: Cantatas; Madrigal; Canons
- H 71104 VIVALDI: 5 Concertos for Diverse Instruments
- H 71105 MASTER WORKS FOR ORGAN, Vol 2
- H 71106 HAYDN: Sym No 54, No 34, No 75
- H 71107 BACH: Sonatas for Cello & Harpsichord, BWV 1027, 1028, 1029
- H 71108 DANZI: 3 Woodwind Quintets
- H 71109 TELEMANN: Water Music; Cto for 3 Violins & Strings
- H 71110 MASTER WORKS FOR ORGAN, Vol 3
- H 71111 RENAISSANCE MUSIC FOR BRASS
- H 71112 MOZART: 6 Preludes & Fugues for Str Trio, K. 404a
- h 71113 BERWALD: Piano Quintets, Nos 1 & 2
- H 71114 QUARTET MUSIC OF THE 17th & 18th CENTURIES
- H 71115 THE DOVE DESCENDING
- H 71116 THE PLEASURES OF CERVANTES
- H 71117 18th-CENTURY ITALIAN HARPSICHORD MUSIC
- H 71118 ROYAL BRASS MUSIC
- H 71119 MASTERS OF THE HIGH BAROQUE
- H 71120 IN A MEDIEVAL GARDEN
- H 71121 HAYDN: Sym No 13 No 64, No 29
- H 71122 MILHAUD: Le Boeuf sur le toit; La Creation du monde
- H 71123 COURT & CHAMBER MUSIC OF THE 18th CENTURY
- H 71124 TELEMANN: Concerto; Ouverture; Trio
- H 71125 C. STAMITZ: 4 Qts for Winds & Strings
- H 71126 MOZART: Ctos for Flute, K. 313, K. 314; Andante in C, K. 315
- H 71127 HANDEL: Water Music (complete)
- H 71128 PRAETORIUS: Christmas Music; Dances/SCHEIN 2 Suites
- H 71129 BACH: Sinfonie, BWV 1046a, 152, 156, 42, 209, 76, 75
- H 71130 LOUIS XIII: Ballet, Chanson, Diminutions, Psalms/CHARPENTIER: Messe
- H 71131 HAYDN: Sym No 35, No 43 (Mercury), No 80
- H 71132 TELEMANN: Ctos for Tpts & Oboes; Ouverture in C
- H 71133 STRAVINSKY: Les Noces; Pribaoutki; Berceuses du Chat; other works
- H 71134 MONTEVERDI: Magnificat/SCHOTZ: Deutsches Magnificat; Saul, Saul; Psalm 2
- H 71135 DE FALLA: Cto for Hps & 5 Instrs; Piano Works
- H 71136 BACH: Cantatas, BWV 199 & 209
- H 71137 BACH: Lute Music, BWV 996, 999, 1000,1006a, 1007
- H 71138 DEMANTIUS: St. John Passion; Prophecy
- H 71139 BRUCKNER: Sym No 7 in E (orig version)
- H 71140 ELGAR/SIBELIUS: String Quartets
- H 71141 A BOUQUET OF OLD VIENNA DANCES
- H 71142 BACH: Cantatas, BWV 169 & 56
- H 71143 HAYDN: Piano Sonatas Nos 20, 23, 52
- H 71144 BACH: 2- & 3-part Inventions (complete)
- H 71145 BAROQUE FANFARES & SONATAS FOR BRASS
- H 71146 BATTLE MUSIC
- H 71147 BACH: "Hunting" Cantata, BWV 208
- H 71148 VIRTUOSO WIND CONCERTOS
- H 71149 HINDEMITH: Die Serenaclen; Martinslied; Violin Sonata; Duet
- H 71150 MASTER WORKS FOR ORGAN, Vol 4 (Works by Frangois & Louis Couperin)
- H 71151 GEMINIANI: The Enchanted Forest/LOCATELLI: If Pianto d'Arianna
- H 71152 BEETHOVEN: String Quartets, Op 18, nos 5 & 6
- H 71153 MASQUE MUSIC
- H 71154 HAYDN: The Seven Last Words of Christ (Orig, Orch version)
- H 71155 RACIMANINOFF: Sonata for Piano & Cello, Op 19 KODALY: Sonata for Cello & Piano, Op 4
- H 71156 SYMPHONIES FOR KING$ Kraus: Sym in C min/Brunetti: Sym No 23 in F
- H 71157 STOCKHAUSEN: Momente
- H 71158 FAURÉ: Requiem
- H 71159 HANDEL: Tu fedel, tu costante/BOISMORTIER: Diane et Action
- H 71160 SCHOTZ: Concertos from Symphoniae sacrae, Book 1 (1629)
- H 71161 MUSIC FOR THE CLASSIC GUITAR
- H 71162 G.-B. SAMMARTINI: 5 Symphonies
- H 71163 ROSSINI: Sins of My Old Age (piano excerpts)
- H 71164 HANDEL: Harp Cto; Ballet Music "Terpsichore"; 3 Flute Sonatas
- H 71165 J. C. BACH: 2 Sinfonias; Sinfonia Concertante in C
- H 71166 BACH: Cantata BWV 201, "Der Streit zwischen Phoebus und Pan"
- H 71167 DOWLAND: Songs & Ayres
- H 71168 HAYDN: Sym No 77, No 61
- H 71169 IVES: Piano Sonata No 1
- H 71170 MASTER WORKS FOR ORGAN, Vol 5
- H 71171 VOICES OF THE MIDDLE AGES (Music from the Gothic Cathedral)
- H 71172 BIBER: Six Sonatas for 2 Tpts, Strings & Continuo
- H 71173 HAYDN: Mass in D minor (Nelson Mass)
- H 71174 SUBOTNICK: Silver Apples of the Moon (For Electronic Music Synthesizer)
- H 71175 BARTOK: Music for Piano
- H 71176 BACH: Partitas for Harpsichord
- H 71177 SCHOTZ: Italian Madrigals
- H 71178 FAURE: Ballade for Piano & Orch, Op 19/Pelleas et Melisande (Suite from the Incidental Music), Op 80
- H 71179 ROSSINI: 3 Sonatas for Strings (Nos 1, 6 & 5)
- H 71180 C.P.E. BACH: 4 Orchestral Symphonies, Wq 183
- H 71181 THE PLAY OF HEROD (A 12th-Century Christmas Drama)
- H 71182 TELEMANN: Cantata, "Machet die Tore Weit"/BACH: Cantata BWV 151, "Süsser Trost, mein Jesus kommt"
- H 71183 BIZET: Symphony in C; Jeux d'Enfants; Patrie Overture
- H 71184 MACHAUT: Notre Dame Mass; Gregorian Proper
- H 71185 HAYDN: Concertos for Violin, nos I & 3
- H 71186 SCHOENBERG: Ode to Napoleon Buonaparte, Op 41/WEBERN: String Quartet, Op 28/STRAVINSKY: 3 Pieces; Concertino for Str Quartet
- H 71187 BACH: Cantata BWV 206, "Schleicht, spielende Wellen"
- H 71188 MASTERWORKS FOR ORGAN, Vol 6 (Works of Buxtehude)
- H 71189 DEBUSSY: Iberia (images pour orchestra, No. 2)/ALBENIZ: Suite from Iberia (Arbos orchestration)
- H 71190 TELEMANN: 4 Cantatas from "Harmonischer Gottesdienst"
- H 71191 HAYDN: Symphonies, Nos 90 & 91
- H 71192 SCHOENBERG: 5 Pieces for Orchestra, Op IS/WEBERN: Cantata No 1, Op 29/STRAVINSKY: Dumbarton Oaks Cto for Ch Orch
- H 71193 WERNER: The Curious Musical-Instrument Calendar
- H 71194 MOZART: Serenade No 4, K. 203/3 Marches, K. 408
- H 71195 FIELD: Nocturnes for Piano
- H 71196 SCHÜTZ: Symphoniae sacrae: Concertos from Book 11 (1647)
- H 71197 HAYDN: Overture to an English Opera; Syrn No 63 (La Roxolane), No 78
- H 71198 RUDIN: Tragoedia, for Electronic Music Synthesizer
- H 71199 GABURO: Music for Voices, Instruments & Electronic Sounds
- H 71200 YANKEE ORGAN MUSIC
- H 71201 XENAKIS: Akrata; Pithoprakta/PENDERECKI: Capriccio for Vln & Orch; De natura sonoris
- H 71202 CAGE: Concerto for Prepared Piano & Ch Orch/FOSS: Baroque Variations
- H 71203 SIBELIUS: 4 Legends from "The Kalevala," Op 22
- H 71204 STUDENT MUSIC IN 17th-CENTURY LEIPZIG
- H 71205 R. STRAUSS: Sonata in E flat for Vln & Pno, Op 18/RESPIGHI: Sonata in B min for Vln & Pno
- H 71206 BACH: Cantata BWV 215
- H 71207 MOZART: 3 Divertimentos, K. 136, 137, 138; 6 Country Dances, K. 606
- H 71208 SUBOTNICK: The Wild Bull, for Electronic Music Synthesizer
- H 71209 IVES: Songs/GOEHR: 4 Songs from the Japanese/SCHURMANN: Chuench'i
- H 71210 WIDOR: Organ Symph No 5 in F min, Op 42, No 1
- H 71211 SCHUBERT: Die schöne Müllerin, D. 795
- H 71212 STRAVINSKY: Music for Piano
- H 71213 MUSIC AT DROTTNINGHOLM: 18th Century Music in the Royal Swedish Court & Theater
- H 71214 MASTER WORKS FOR ORGAN, Vol 7
- H 71215 MUSSORGSKY: Songs & Dances of Death; 7 Songs
- H 71216 DESPREZ: Missa Ave maris stella; 4 Motets
- H 71217 THE ART OF THE BAROQUE TRUMPET
- H 71218 BERWALD: Overtures & Tone Poems
- H 71219 SPECTRUM: New American Music, Vol I
- H 71220 SPECTRUM: New American Music, Vol II
- H 71221 SPECTRUM: New American Music, Vol III
- H 71222 AMERICAN BRASS MUSIC
- H 71223 ERB: Music for Instruments & Electronic Sounds
- H 71224 CAGE & HILLER: HPSCHD, for Harpsichords & Tapes/JOHNSTON: String Quartet No 2
- H 71225 WUORINEN: Time's Encomium, for Synthesized & Processed Synthesized Sound
- H 71226 BACH: Cantata BWV213
- H 71227 MANDOLIN MUSIC by Beethoven & Hummel
- H 71228 GYPSY SONGS by Brahms & Schumann
- H 71229 THE BAROQUE LUTE
- H 71230 SCHUBERT: Syrn No I in D, D. 82; No 2 in B flat, D. 125
- H 71231 SALZMAN: The Nude Paper Sermon, for Actor, Renaissance Consort, Chorus, Electronics
- H 71232 A NONESUCH CHRISTMAS from the Baroque, Renaissance, and Middle Ages. liner notes by Joshua Rifkin. Cover art by Abe Gurvin, art director William S. Harvey
- H 71233 SPANISH MUSIC FOR THE CLASSIC GUITAR
- H 71234 CARTER: Sonata for Cello & Piano; Sonata Ob, Cello & Hps
- H 71235 SCHÜTZ: Psalmen Davids: 5 Ctos for Choruses & Instruments (1619)
- H 71236 NIELSEN: Symphony No 5, Op 50; Saga-D
- H 71237 THE CONTEMPORARY CONTRABASS: New American Music by Cage, Johnston, Oliveros
- H 71238 HANDEL: Sonatas for Violin & Continuo, Op 1, Nos 3, 10, 12, 13, 14, 15
- H 71239 BARTOK: Concerto for Viola & Orc/HINDEMITH: "Der Schwanendreher" for Viola & Orch
- H 71240 MAHLER: Symphony No 1 in D
- H 71241 MASTER WORKS FOR ORGAN, Vol 8
- H 71242 PRAETORIUS: Polychoral Christmas Music
- H 71243 BACH: "Shepherd Cantata," BWV 249a
- H 71244 MOZART: Sym No 21 in A, K. 134; No 27 in G, K. 199
- H 71245 COMPUTER MUSIC: Works by Randall, Vercoe, Dodge
- H 71246 XENAKIS: Electro-Acoustic Music
- H 71247 BUSNOIS: Chansons
- H 71248 JOPLIN: Piano Rags
- H 71249 CARTER: String Quartets, Nos 1 & 2
- H 71250 EARTH'S MAGNETIC FIELD: Realizations in Electronic Sound
- H 71251 SCHOENBERG: Pierrot Lunaire, Op 21
- H 71252 MASTER WORKS FOR ORGAN, Vol 9
- H 71253 DRUCKMAN: Animus III; synapse/Valentine
- H 71254 MENDELSSOHN: Sym No 3, Op 56 ("Scotch")
- H 71255 CRUMB: Ancient Voices of Children
- H 71256 BACH: Cantatas, BWV 68 & 172
- H 71257 HELIOTROPE BOUQUET: Piano Rags 1900-1970 (William Bolcom)
- H 71258 BUXTEHUDE: Four Solo Cantatas
- H 71259 MAHLER: Symphony No 4
- H 71260 NEW MUSIC FOR ORGAN Bolcom: Black Host/Albright: Organbook 11
- H 71261 DESPREZ: Chansons, Frottole & Instrumental Pieces
- H 71262 DVORAK: Symphony No 8 in G, Op 88
- H 71263 WUORINEN: Chamber Cto for Cello & 10 Players; Ringing Changes for Percussion Ensemble
- H 71264 JOPLIN: Piano Rags, Vol 2
- H 71265 LOUIS & FRANCOIS COUPERIN: Pieces de Clavecin (Fuller)
- H 71266 SOUSA: Marches (Czech Brass Orchestra)
- H 71267 FOERSTER: Symphony No. 4
- H 71268 Songs by Stephen Foster
- H 71269 VARESE: Offrandes, Integrales, Octandre, Ecuatorial
- H 71270 TRUMPET CONCERTOS by Hertel, L. Mozart, Hummel
- H 71271 DVORAK: Symphonic Variations, opus 78; Scherzo opus 66; Notturno opus 40
- H 71272 AMOROUS DIALOGUES OF THE RENAISSANCE
- H 71273 BACH: Cantatas BWV 84 and 49
- H 71274 BAROQUE TRUMPET RECITAL. Music by Cazzati, Fontana, Marini, Telemann
- H 71275 THE NEW TRUMPET. Works for Trumpet with Tape and Piano
- H 71276 EARLY AMERICAN VOCAL MUSIC
- H 71277 NENNA: Madrigals, Motets and instrumental pieces
- H 71278 RAMEAU: Pieces de clavecin
- H 71279 BAROQUE MASTERPIECES FOR TRUMPET AND ORGAN. Suite of Trumpet Voluntaries in D (Greene & Boyce)
- H 71280 RUTH CRAWFORD SEEGER: String Quartet/PERLE: Quartet No. 5/BABBITT: Quartet No. 2
- H 71281 WEILL: Kleine Dreigroschenmusik/MILHAUD: La creation du monde
- H 71282 ZELENKA: Lamentations Jeremiae Prophetae
- H 71283 GEORGE ROCHBERG: Quartet No. 3
- H 71284 Piano Music by George Gershwin (William Bolcom)
- H 71285 DAVIES: Eight Songs for a Mad King
- H 71286 VECCHI: L'Amfiparnaso
- H 71287 RAFF: Symphony No. 5
- H 71288 JANACEK: Music for Male Chorus
- H 71289 MUSIC FOR FLUTE AND TAPE
- H 71290 BAROQUE MASTERPIECES for Trumpet and Organ, Vol. 2
- H 71291 PERCUSSION MUSIC. Works by Varese, Colgrass, Cowell, Saperstein, Oak
- H 71292 MUSIC IN HONOR OF ST. THOMAS OF CANTERBURY
- H 71293 GEORGE CRUMB: Makrokosmos, Vol. 1
- H 71294 HANDEL: Wedding Anthem "Sing Unto God"/BACH: Cantata BWV 131
- H 71295 DAVIES: Vesalii Icones
- H 71296 WOLF: Songs from "Spanisches Liederbuch"
- H 71297 WILLIAM BOLCOM: Frescoes
- H 71298 CORNET FAVORITES
- H 71299 WILLIAM BOLCOM: Pastimes & Piano Rags
- H 71301 A FESTIVAL OF TRUMPETS (The New York Trumpet Ensemble)
- H 71302 NEW AMERICAN MUSIC VOL. IV: Stefan Wolpe: Quartet for trumpet, tenor sax, percussion & piano; George Rochberg: Blake songs; Jeff Jones: Ambiance (Contemporary Chamber Ensemble - Dir.: Arthur Weisberg)
- H 71303 SPECTRUM: NEW AMERICAN MUSIC, VOLUME V (The Contemporary Chamber Ensemble)
- H 71304 JOAN MORRIS & WILLIAM BOLCOM: After The Ball
- H 71305 JOSHUA RIFKIN: Piano Rags by Scott Joplin, Vol. 3
- H 71306 CHARLES IVES: String Quartets Nos. 1 & 2
- H 71307 STRAUSS: Death and Transfiguration / HINDESMITH: Symphony, Mathis der Maler(London Symphony Orchestra)
- H 71308 WORCESTER FRAGMENTS (Accademia Monteverdiana; Stevens)
- H 71309 SCHOENBERG: Piano Works (Paul Jacobs)
- H 71310 FRANCK: Chorales for Organ (Murray, T.)
- H 71311 GEORGE CRUMB: Music for a Summer Evening (Makrokosmos III)
- H 71312 PLAINCHANT & POLYPHONY (Schola Antiqua; Blackley)
- H 71314 ELLIOT CARTER: Double Concerto, Duo for Violin & Piano
- H 71315 MEDIEVAL CHRISTMAS (Boston Camerata; Cohen)
- H 71316 MILHAUD: Piano Music (William Bolcom)
- H 71317 HENRY CLAY WORK: Who Shall Rule This American Nation? Songs of the Civil War Era (The Camerata Chorus of Washington)
- H 71319 WUORINEN: String Trio / Bearbeitungen uber das Glogauer Liederbuch / Grand Bamboula (Members of Speculum Musicae; The Light Fantastic Players)
- H 71320 SCHUBERT: Songs / SCHOENBERG: The Book of the Hanging Gardens (DeGaetani; Kalish)
- H 71321 BACH, J. S.: Organ Works (Heintze)
- H 71322 DEBUSSY: Etudes (Jacobs)
- H 71323 MOZART: Cassation #1 in D, K 100/62a (Russell Davies; Saint Paul Chamber)
- H 71324 BOLCOM: Open House / Commedia (The Saint Paul Chamber Orchestra)
- H 71325 IVES: Songs (DaGaetani & Kalish)
- H 71326 THE PLEASURES OF THE ROYAL COURTS (Various Artists)
- H 71330 VAUDEVILLE: Songs of the Great Ladies of The Musical Stage
- H 71331 SCHOENBERG: Serenade for Seven Instruments & Bass Voice, Op. 24 (The Light Fantastic Players)
- H 71332 BUXTEHUDE: Cantatas
- H 71335 SCHUBERT: Mass No. 5 in A Flat (The Saint Paul Chamber Orchestra)
- H 71336 OCKEGHEM: Missa Ma maistress (Pomerium Musices; Blachly)
- H 71337 IVES: Piano Sonata No. 2, "Concord" (Gilbert Kalish)
- H 71339 HANDEL: Sonatas for Oboe & Continuo, Op.1 / Trio Sonatas for 2 Oboes & Continuo (Roseman; Brewer; MacCourt; Eddy; Brewer)
- H 71340 BEETHOVEN: Folksong Settings (Accademia Monteverdiana; Stevens)
- H 71341 COUSINS: Polkas, Waltzes & Other Entertainments for Cornet & Trombone (Schwarz; Barron; Cooper; Dean; Gould; Bolter; Edelman)
- H 71344 HAYDN: Piano Music Volume III (Gilbert Kalish)
- H 71345 WILLAERT: Motets (Boston Camerata; Rifkin)
- H 71350 CZECH MUSIC FOR VIOLIN: Janacek / Dvorak / Smetana (Luca; Schoenfield)
- H 71351 NEW AMERICAN MUSIC FOR CHAMBER ENSEMBLE: Heiss / Shifrin / Lansky (The Boston Musica Viva)
- H 71352 TELEMANN: Music for Wind Instruments
- H 71354 SING WE NOEL (Boston Camerata)
- H 71355 RAVEL: Chansons madecasses, Sonata (de Gaetani; Dunkel; Anderson; Kalish)
- H 71356 BAROQUE MASTERPIECES FOR TRUMPET & ORGAN VOLUME III (Tarr; Kent; Ullrich; Apostle)
- H 71358 JOAN MORRIS & WILLIAM BOLCOM: Songs by Ira & George Gershwin
- H 71360 RIVERS OF DELIGHT: Folk Hymns from the Sacred Harp (Various Artists)
- H 71362 HAYDN: Piano Music Volume IV (Gilbert Kalish)
- H 71363 DOWLAND: The Most High and Mighty Christianus the Fourth, King of Denmark, His Galliard, and other lute works by Dowland and Byrd (Paul O'Dette)
- H 71364 SCHUMANN: Duets (DaGaetani & Kalish)
- H 71365 DEBUSSY: Images (Jacobs, P.)
- H 71367 DUFAY: Missa Ecce ancilla domini (Pomerium Musices; Blachly)
- H 71368 BERLIOZ: Symphonie funebre et triomphale (Dondeyne)
- H 71369 CHRISTMAS IN ANGLIA: Early English Music for Christmastide (Ensemble For Early Music; Frederick Renz, director)
- H 71370 SCHUBERT: Music for Violin & Piano (Luca; Kalichstein)
- H 71377 BEETHOVEN: Sonatas; MOZART: Rondos (Malcolm Bilson)
- H 71378 TALLIS: Mass (Puer Natus Est) (Clerkes of Oxenford; Wulstan)
- H 71385 BAROQUE BRASS FESTIVAL. Music of Gabrieli, Locke, Biber, Scheidt, Speer, Guami, and Lappi (Edward Tarr Brass Ensemble)
- H 71386 FRANZ SCHUBERT: Sonata in C Major, Drei Klavierstücke (Gilbert Kalish)
- H 71387 THE SILVER SWAN and other Elizabethan and Jacobean Madrigals. The Scholars
- H 71388 C.P.E. BACH: Flute Concerto in D Minor; FRANZ HOFFMEISTER: Flute Concerto No. 8 in D Major
- H 71389 MUSIC OF THE RENAISSANCE VIRTUOSI. James Tyler
- H 71390 ECOS D'ESPANA. Guitar Music of Spain (Carlos Bonell)
- H 71391 ORLANDO GIBBONS. Church Music of Jacobean England Volume II
- H 71392 LA MANIOVANA. Italian Airs & Dances of the Earley Baroque
- H 71393 THE VIRTUOSO RECORDER
- H 71394 SIR WILLIAM WALTON. Symphony No. 1 in B-Flat Minor
- H 71395 D'ANGLEBERT-LULLY: Pieces de Clavecin
- H 71396 JOHN SHEPPARD: "Cantate" Mass; Reponsory; "Spiritus Sanctus"
- H 71397 DVORAK: Trio for Piano #3 in f, opus 65 (Raphael Trio)
- H 71398 ALESSANDRO SCARLATTI: Vespers of Saint Cecilia
- H 71399 MACDOWELL: First Modern Suite; Sonata No. 4 (Fierro)
- H 71400 ROBERT WHITE: Lamentations of Jeremiah (Clerkes of Oxenford; Wulstan)
- H 71401 STRAVINSKY BALLETS. Apollo; Orpheus
- H 71402 PARIS, A NOUS DEUX. Music of Francaix, Pierné, & Rivier (Netherlands Saxophone Quartet)
- H 71403 GUITAR MUSIC OF THE BAROQUE (Carlos Bonell)
- H 71404 BACH: Suite in E minor, BWV 996; SCARLATTI: Five Sonatas (Baltazar Benitez)
- H 71405 FRANK BRIDGE: Piano Quintet; Phantasie Trio
- H 71406 ELGAR: SYMPHONY NO. 2
- H 71407 PALESTRINA. Pope Marcellus Mass; Stabat Mater; Three Motets
- H 71408 YSAYE. 6 Sonatas for Solo Violin (Charles Castleman)
- H 71409 PIANO MUSIC OF CHARLES TOMLINSON GRIFFES (Noel Lee)
- H 71410 ALEXANDER GLAZUNOV: Quartet; PIERRE MAX DUBOIS: Quartet; EUGENE BOZZA: Andante and Scherzo (Netherlands Saxophone Quartet)
- H 71411 EDWARD MACDOWELL: Woodland Sketches/Sea Pieces Vol II (Charles Fierro)
- H 71412 JANACEK: Concertino; PROKOFIEV: Overture on Hebrew Themes; BERWALD: Septet (Amsterdam Nonet)
- H 71417 SAYGUN: Concerto for Piano #1 (Onay; Aykal; Turkish Presidential)
- H 71420 JOSHUA RIFKIN: Baroque Beatles

=== Records for children ===
- H 72001 The Red Balloon (adapted from the French film classic by Albert Lamorisse)

=== Explorer series ===
- H 72002 The Soul of Flamenco. Cuadro Flamenco: Pepa Reyes, Angel Mancheno, Juan Garcia de la Mata, Manolo Leiva
- H 72003 The Music of India. S. Balachander, veena; Sivaraman, mridangam
- H 72004 Bouzoukee: The Music of Greece. Iordanis Tsomidis, bouzoukee; others
- H 72005 The Koto Music of Japan. Master Hagiwara, Master Hatta, Master Kitagawa, Master Kukusui
- H 72006 Caledonia! The Macpherson Singers & Dancers of Scotland
- H 72007 The Pennywhistlers; Seven Young Women Sing Folksongs from Bulgaria, Czechoslovakia, Hungary, the U.S.A., the U.S.S.R., Yugoslavia
- H 72008 Japanese Koto Classics. Shinichi Yuize
- h 72009 The Real Mexico in Music and Song. Recorded in the State of Michoacan by Henrietta Yurchenco. E. Ramos & T. Naranjo, harp; R. Acuna, vihuela; J. Bautista, guitar; Vocal Trio Las Hermanas Pulido; Vocal & Instrumental Ensembles
- H 72010 A Heritage of Folk Song from Old Russia. Maria Christova, soprano; Dobrynia Choral & Instr Ensemble; D. Salmanoff dir.
- H 72011 MUSIC OF BULGARIA. Soloists, Chorus & Orch of the Ensemble of the Bulgarian Republic, Phillips Koutev cond.
- H 72012 GEZA MUSIC OF JAPAN. Music from the Kabuki Theater. Leading soloists of Japan
- H 72013 THE REAL BAHAMAS IN MUSIC AND SONG. Recorded on location in the Bahamas by Peter K. Siegel and Jody Stecher
- H 72014 CLASSICAL MUSIC OF INDIA. Featuring renowned soloists recorded in India by John Levy
- H 72015 MUSIC FROM THE MORNING OF THE WORLD (The Balinese Gamelan)
- H 72016 THE SOUND OF THE SUN (Steel Band/Trinidad)
- H 72017 TAHITI: THE GAUGUIN YEARS. Songs & Dances of Tahiti. Recorded on location by Francis Maziere
- H 72018 DHYANAM/MEDITATION. South Indian Vocal Music. K.V. Narayanaswamy, singer; P. Raghu, mridangam; V.V. Subramaniam, violin; S. Balasubramaniam, tambura
- H 72019 BHAVALU/IMPRESSIONS. South Indian Instrumental Music. P. Raghu, mridangam; V.V. Subramaniam, violin; K.V. Narayanaswamy, singer; S. Balasubramaniam, tambura
- H 72020 FLOWER DANCE: JAPANESE FOLK MELODIES
- H 72021 LOS CHIRIGUANOS OF PARAGUAY. Guarani Songs & Dances. Angel Sanabria, singer & guitar; Pablo Vicente Morel, harp
- H 72022 KALPANA/IMPROVISATIONS. Instrumental & Dance Music Of India. M. S. Gupta, sarod; L. A. Khan, tabla; T. Ajmani, dancer
- HB 72023 RAMNAD KRISHNAN; VIDWAN. Songs of the Carnatic tradition. Ramnad Krishnan, singer; V. Thyagarajan, vin; T. Ranganathan, mridangam; V. Nagarajan, kanjira; P. Srinivasan, tambura (2-rec set)
- H 72024 THE PENNYWHISTLERS. A Cool Day and Crooked Corn
- H 72025 A BELL RINGING IN THE EMPTY SKY. Japanese Shakuhachi Music. Goro Yamaguchi, shakuhachi
- H 72026 VOICES OF AFRICA. High-Life & Other Popular Music. Saka Acquaye & his African Ensemble from Ghana
- H 72027 THE TEN GRACES PLAYED ON THE VINA. Music of South India. M. Nageswara Rao, vina; V. Thyagarajan, vln; T. Ranganathan, mridangam; V. Nagarajan, kanjira; P. Srinivasan, tambura
- H 72028 GOLDEN RAIN. Balinese Gamelan Music & Ketjak: The Ramayana Monkey Chant. Recorded in Bali by David Lewiston
- H 72029 KINGDOM OF THE SUN. Peru's Inca Heritage. Recorded in Peru by David Lewiston
- H 72030 SARANGI, THE VOICE OF A HUNDRED COLORS. Instrumental Music of North India. Ram Narayan, sarangi; M. Misra, tabla; S. Cor, tambura
- H 72031 THE JASMINE ISLE. Music of the Javanese Gamelan. Recorded in Java by Suryabrata & David Lewiston
- H 72032 THE PULSE OF TANAM. Ragas of South India, M. Nageswara Rao, vina
- H 72033 FOLK FIDDLING FROM SWEDEN. Traditional Fiddle Tunes from Dalarna, played by Bjorn Stabi & Ole Hjorth
- H 72034 A HARVEST, A SHEPHERD, A BRIDE. Village Music of Bulgaria, Collected & produced by Ethel Raim & Martin Koenig
- H 72035 INDIAN STREET MUSIC. The Bauls of Bengal
- H 72036 IN PRAISE OF OXALA AND OTHER GODS. Black Music of South America. Recorded in Colombia, Ecuador & Brazil by David Lewiston
- H 72037 MUSIC FOR THE BALINESE SHADOW PLAY. Recorded in Bali by Robert E. Brown
- H 72038 IN THE SHADOW OF THE MOUNTAIN: Bulgarian Folk Music. Songs & Dances of Pirin-Macedonia, collected & produced by Ethel Raim & Martin Koenig
- H 72039 THE PERSIAN SANTUR. Music of Iran. Nasser Rastegar-Nejad
- H 72040 RAMNAD KRISHNAN: Kaccheri. A concert of South Indian classical music
- H 72041 ESCALAY: The Water Wheel. Oud Music of Nubia. Hamza El Din, voice & oud.
- H 72042 VILLAGE MUSIC OF YUGOSLAVIA. Collected in Yugoslavia & produced by Martin Koenig
- H 72043 THE AFRICAN MBIRA. Music of the Shona people of Rhodesia. Played & sung by Dumisani Abraham Maraire, with Nkosana Arthur Maraire & Sukatai Laura Chiora
- H 72044 JAVANESE COURT GAMELAN from the Pura Paku Alaman, Jogyakarta; K.R.T. Wasitodipuro, director. Recorded in Java by Robert E. Brown
- H 72045 FIESTAS OF PERU: Music of the High Andes
- H 72046 GAMELAN SEMAR PEGULINGAN/Gamelan of the Love God
- H 72047 CARIBBEAN ISLAND MUSIC. Songs & Dances of Haiti, the Dominican Republic & Jamaica
- H 72048 THE IRISH PIPES OF FINBAR FUREY
- H 72049 P'ANSORI. Korea's Epic Vocal Art & Instrumental Music
- H 72050 TURKISH VILLAGE MUSIC
- H 72051 CHINA: Shantung Folk Music & Traditional Instrumental Pieces
- H 72052 PALLAVI. South Indian Flute Music
- H 72053 AFGHANISTAN: Music from the Crossroads of Asia
- H 72054 THE SOUL OF MBIRA: Traditions of the Shona People of Rhodesia
- H 72055 TIBETAN BUDDHISM. Tantras of Gyuto: Mahakala
- H 72056 ANIMALS OF AFRICA: Sounds of the Jungle, Plain & Bush
- H 72057 MUSIC FROM THE HEART OF AFRICA/BURUNDI
- H 72058 KASHMIR: Traditional Songs & Dances
- H 72059 IRISH PIPE MUSIC: Hornpipes, Airs & Reels
- H 72060 A PERSIAN HERITAGE: Classical Music of Iran
- H 72061 MUSIC OF THE KARAKORAMS OF CENTRAL ASIA
- H 72062 CLASSICAL MUSIC OF INDIA. Ram Narayan, sarangi
- H 72063 AFRICAN CEREMONIAL AND FOLK MUSIC. Recorded in Uganda, Kenya and Tanzania
- H 72064 TIBETAN BHUDDISM. Tantras of Gyuto: Sangwa Dupa
- H 72065 FESTIVALS OF THE HIMALAYAS. Recorded in Chamba and Kulu
- H 72066 AFRICA: Witchcraft and Ritual Music, recorded in Kenya and Tanzania
- H 72067 TURKEY: A Musical Journey. Traditional songs, dances, and rituals
- H 72068 THE BENGAL MINSTREL: Music of the Bauls
- H 72069 KASHMIR. Traditional Songs & Dances Volume II
- H 72070 MEXICO: Fiestas of Chiapas and Oaxaca
- H 72071 TIBETAN BUDDHISM. Ritual Orchestra & Chants
- H 72072 JAPAN. Traditional Vocal & Instrumental Music
- H 72073 AFRICA: Drum, chant, and instrumental music recorded in Niger, Mali, and Upper Volta
- H 72074 JAVANESE COURT GAMELAN Volume II
- H 72075 LADAKH. Songs & Dances from the Highlands of Western Tibet
- H 72076 SHAKUHACHI. The Japanese Flute
- H 72077 ZIMBABWE: Shona mbira music
- H 72078 THE REAL BAHAMAS Volume II
- H 72079 FESTIVALS OF THE HIMALAYAS Volume II
- H 72080 QAWWALI. Sufi Music of Pakistan (Sabri Brothers)
- H 72081 TIBETAN BUDDHISM. A Ghost Excorcism Ritual
- H 72082 AFRICA. Ancient Ceremonies, Dance Music & Songs of Ghana
- H 72083 JAVANESE COURT GAMELAN Volume III
- H 72084 JAPAN. Kabuki & other traditional music
- H 72085 FLOATING PETALS... WILD GEESE. THE MOON ON HIGH. Music of the Chinese Pipa
- H 72086 NECTAR OF THE MOON. Vichitra Vina Music of Northern India (Dr. Lalmani Misra)
- H 72087 SAVANNAH RHYTHMS. Music of Upper Volta
- H 72088 ISLAND MUSIC OF THE SOUTH PACIFIC
- 72089 SPRING NIGHT ON A MOONLIGHT RIVER: Music of the Chinese zither
- 72090 RHYTHMS OF THE GRASSLANDS. Music of Upper Volta, Volume II
- 72091 AN ISLAND CARNIVAL. Music of the West Indies
- 72092 ROMANIAN REFLECTIONS. Village and Urban
- 72093 SAMUL-NORI. Drums and Voices of Korea

=== Multiple sets ===
HB=2-rec set; HC=3-rec set; HD=4-rec set; HE=5-rec set

- HE 73001 BACH: Complete Harpsichord Concertos
- HB 73002 BEETHOVEN: Missa Solemnis
- HB 73003 BRAHMS: German Requiem; Alto Rhapsody; Fast- und Gedenksprache
- HC 73004 BACH: St. John Passion, BWV 245
- HB 73005 BEETHOVEN: Fidelio
- HB 73006 BACH: Brandenburg Concertos, BWV 1046-1051
- HB 73007 HINDEMITH: Des Marienleben (New Version, 1948)
- HC 73008 BAROQUE MASTERS OF VENICE, NAPLES, & TUSCANY
- HC 73009 HAYDN: Die Jahreszeiten (The Seasons), Oratorio
- HB 73010 MUSIC OF SHAKESPEARE'S TIME
- HC 73011 HAYDN: The 6 "Paris" Symphonies (Nos. 82-87)
- HB 73012 SCHÜTZ: Kleine geistliche Konzerte, Bock 1 (1636)
- HB 73013 BACH: The Art of Fugue, BWV 1080
- HC 73014 MUSIC AT THE COURTS: Italy, Sweden & France (16th to 18th Centuries)
- HD 73015 BACH: Orgelbachlein, BWV 599-644 (with Cantata Chorales & other Chorale Settings)
- HB 73016 THE TRIUMPH OF MAXIMILIAN I (Music of the 15th & 16th Centuries)
- HB 73017 BACH: Sonatas for Vln & Hps, BWV 1014-1019
- HC 73018 THE NONESUCH GUIDE TO ELECTRONIC MUSIC (2-rec set)
- HF 73019 HAYDN: The 12 "London" Symphonies (Nos 93-104)
- HC 73020 BACH: Masses, BWV 233-236
- HD 73021 BACH: St. Matthew Passion, BWV 244
- HB 73022 BERLIOZ: L'Enfance du Christ
- HB 73023 MAHLER: Symphony No 3
- HD 73024 SCHÜTZ: Kleine geistliche Konzerte, Book II
- HB 73025 CHARLES IVES: 4 Sonatas for Violin & Piano; Largo
- HB 73027 J.C.F. BACH: 7 Symphonies (Cologne Chamber Orchestra)
- HB 73028 TWENTIETH-CENTURY FLUTE MUSIC (Sollberger)
- HB 73030 JOHANN SEBASTIAN BACH: The Sonatas & Partitas for Unaccompanied Violin
- HB 73031 CLAUDE DEBUSSY: Preludes for Piano (Paul Jacobs)
- HB 73032 MONTEVERDI: Christmas Vespers
- HB 73033 HENRY PURCELL: Complete Music for Harpsichord (Robert Woolley)
- HB 73034 BRAHMS: The Complete Sonatas for Violin and Piano
- 73035 SCRIABIN: The Complete Piano Sonatas (Ruth Laredo)

=== Special albums ===
- H 7-11 NONESUCH EXPLORER: Music from Distant Corners of the World (Treasures of the Explorer Series) (2-rec set)
- H 7-12 A BAROQUE FESTIVAL

=== Silver series ===
- N 78001 Morton Subotnick, A Sky Of Cloudless Sulphur After The Butterfly
- N 78002 Music for Winds, Gustav Holst and Ralph Vaughan Williams
- N 78003 The Play of Daniel (Lupus Danielis). A Liturgical Drama
- N 78004 Mozart: Sonatas #12 and 13 (Bilson)
- N 78005 Mozart: Two Duos for Violin and Viola
- N 78006 Milton Babbitt, Mell Powell
- N 78007 The New Nonesuch Guide to Electronic Music
- N 78008 Beethoven's Sonatas
- N 78009 Civilization & Its Discontents. A Music Theater Comedy by Michael Sahl and Eric Salzman
- NC 78010 Beethoven: Sonata #16, 17, 18, 21, 23, 24, and 26 (Rosen) (3-rec set)
- N 78011 George Rochberg: Quintet for Piano and String Quartet
- N 78012 Morton Subotnik: Axolotl/The Wild Beasts
- N 78013 Mozart: Four-Hand Sonatas, Vol. 1
- NB 78014 Hugo Wolf: Italienisches Liederbuch (2-rec set)
- N 78015 Beethoven: Septet in E flat, opus 20 (BSO Chamber Players)
- 78016 Mozart: Sonata in F, K 533/494 (Bilson)
- 78017 Rochberg: Quartet No. 7; Barber: String Quartet; Dover Beach
- 78018 Haydn: Two Great E-flat Sonatas (Malcolm Bilson)
- 78019 The Art of the Mandolin (Emanuil Sheynkman)
- 78021 Couperin, L.: Suite in g (Kipnis, I.)
- 78022 Barber, Milhaud, Arnold, Ligeti, Ibert (Barry Tuckwell Wind Quintet)
- 78024 Stefan Wolpe: Enactments/Second Piece for Violin alone/From here on farther... (performed by "Continuum")
- 78025 Claude Debussy, Chansons de Bilitis (de Gaetani; Kalish)
- 78027 Tom Stoppard, The Real Thing (Jeremy Irons & Glenn Close)
- 78028 Schubert: Sonata #20 in A, D 959 (Goode)

=== Digital series ===
- D 79001 Los Angeles Chamber Orchestra; Gerard Schwarz, conductor: Schoenberg: Five pieces for orchestra, op. 16 / Chamber symphony, op. 9
- D 79002 Los Angeles Chamber Orchestra; Gerard Schwarz, conductor: American Music for Strings: Samuel Barber, Irving Fine, Elliott Carter, David Diamond
- DB 79003 New York City Opera: Kurt Weill: Silverlake: A Winter's Tale (2-rec set)
- D 79004 Sequoia String Quartet; Allan Vogel, oboe: Luigi Boccherini: Quartet in A Major; Quintet in D Major; Quintet in D Minor; Quintet in E-flat Major
- D 79005 Sequoia String Quartet: Arnold Schoenberg: String Quartet No. 2; Mel Powell: Little Companion Pieces
- D 79006 Paul Jacobs: Paul Jacobs Plays Blues, Ballads & Rags: American Music for Piano
- D 79007 Robert Schumann: Sonata in A Minor; Felix Mendelssohn: Sonata in F Major; Clara Schumann: Three Romances
- D 79008 Los Angeles Vocal Arts Ensemble: Brahms: Liebeslieder Walzer, Op. 52; Neue Liebeslieder Walzer, Op. 65
- D 79009 Orpheus Chamber Orchestra: Mozart: Sinfonia Concertante in E-flat Major
- D 79010 Igor Kipnis: Soler: Fandango & Sonatas
- D 79011 The Waltz Project: 17 Contemporary Waltzes for Piano
- D 79012 Sequoia String Quartet; Julius Levine, bass: Antonín Dvořák: Quintet for Strings in G, opus 77
- D 79013 J.S. Bach: O! holder Tag, erwünschte Zeit. Wedding Cantata BWV 210
- D 79014 Richard Goode: Schumann: Humoreske, opus 20
- D 79015 Los Angeles Chamber Orchestra; Gerard Schwarz, conductor: C.P.E. Bach: Concertos for Harpsichord & Strings in A Major, in D Major
- D 79016 Kurt Weill, Ernő Dohnányi: Sonatas for Cello and Piano
- D 79017 Sequoia String Quartet; David Shifrin, clarinet: Weber
- D 79018 Los Angeles Chamber Orchestra; Gerard Schwarz, conductor: Richard Strauss: Duet-Concertino; Arthur Honegger: Concerto Da Camera
- D 79019 Teresa Stratas: The Unknown Kurt Weill
- DB 79020 Igor Kipnis: The Notebook of Anna Magdalena Bach (2-rec set)
- DB 79021 Sergiu Luca, violin; Paul Schoenfield, piano; David Shifrin, clarinet: Béla Bartók: The Complete Music for Violin with Piano
- D 79022 Musical Offering: Georg Philipp Telemann: A 300th Birthday Celebration
- D 79023 Los Angeles Chamber Orchestra; Gerard Schwarz, conductor: Cherubini: Sinfonia in D / Rossini: Grand Overture, Sinfonia (al conventello)
- D 79024 Paul Jacobs, Joseph Silverstein, American Brass Quintet: Virgil Thomson: A Portrait Album
- D 79025 Boccherini Ensemble: Boccherini: String Quintets Volume One
- D 79026 Sequoia String Quartet: Mozart: Four Early Quartets
- D 79027 Los Angeles Vocal Arts Ensemble: Rossini: Sins of My Old Age
- D 79028 Santa Fe Chamber Music Festival: Schoenberg: Verklärte Nacht; String Trio
- D 79029 London Early Music Group; James Tyler, director: Dolce Vita Mia: Italian Music from the High Renaissance
- D 79030 The Tango Project
- D 79031 Michael Tree, Richard Goode: Brahms: Viola Sonatas
- D 79032 Ruth Laredo: Barber: Piano Sonata; Souvenirs; Nocturne
- D 79033 Los Angeles Chamber Orchestra; Gerard Schwarz, conductor: Janáček: Idyll / Mladi ("Youth")
- D 79034 The Odessa Balalaikas: The Art of the Balalaika
- 79035 Virgil Thomson: Four Saints In Three Acts (2 LPs)
- 79036 J.S. Bach: B Minor Mass (2 LPs)
- 79037 Igor Kipnis: The Virtuoso Handel
- 79038 Paul Jacobs, Ursula Oppens: Stravinsky: The Four-Hand Petrouchka. Three Pieces for String Quartet
- 79039 Calliope: Dances: A Renaissance Revel
- 79040 Sergiu Luca, Rochester Philharmonic; David Zinman, conductor: Spohr: Concerto No. 8; Beethoven: Konzertsatz; Two Romances
- 79041 Ivan Moravec: Janáček
- 79042 Richard Goode & Orpheus Chamber Orchestra: Mozart: Piano Concertos Nos. 17 & 23
- 79043 David Del Tredici: In Memory of a Summer Day
- 79044 Los Angeles Chamber Orchestra; Gerard Schwarz, conductor: Dvořák: Czech Suit, op. 39; Serenade, op. 44
- 79045 Ronald Roseman, Gilbert Kalish, Donald Maccourt, New York Woodwind Quintet: Poulenc: Oboe Sonata; Trio; Sextet
- 79046 Boston Symphony Chamber Players: Schubert: Octet
- 79047 Paul Jacobs: Elliott Carter: Night Fantasies; Piano Sonata
- 79048 Sequoia String Quartet: Prokofiev: String Quartets
- 79049 Carlos Salzedo: Suite of Eight Dances, Short Fantasy on a Noel Provençal, Short Fantasy on a Catalan Carol, Ballade, Scintillation, Traipsin' through Arkansas
- 79050 Tanglewood Festival Chorus; John Oliver, conductor: Weill: Recordare; Dallapiccola: Canti Di Prigionia
- 79051 Bartók: Rhapsody #1; Janáček: Fairy Tale; Prokofiev: Sonata for Cello & Piano in C, opus 119
- 79052 Sergiu Luca, Saint Louis Symphony Orchestra; Leonard Slatkin, conductor: Antonín Dvořák: Violin Concerto; Romance in F Minor; Mazurek in E Minor
- 79053 The Western Wind: An Old-Fashioned Christmas
- 79054 Boccherini Ensemble: Boccherini: String Quintets Volume Two
- 79055 Los Angeles Chamber Orchestra; Hamilton: C.P.E. Bach: Harpsichord Concertos, Vol. II
- 79056 Aston Magna: Vivaldi: Sonatas and Concertos for Two Violins
- 79057 Two to Tango: The Tango Project II
- 79058 William Bolcom: Second Sonata; Duo Fantasy; Graceful Ghost
- 79061 Paul Jacobs, Ursula Oppens: Busoni: Fantasia contrappuntistica; Beethoven: Fugue for Piano four hands, opus 134 (from opus 133); Mozart: Fantasy for Pianos (2), K 608 (Busoni trans.)
- 79062 Charles Rosen: Schumann: The Revolutionary Masterpieces
- 79064 Richard Goode: Schubert: Sonatas for Piano, D.958
- 79065 Gerard Schwarz and the Los Angeles Chamber Orchestra: Brahms: Serenade No. 1
- 79066 Rochester Philharmonic Orchestra: Antonin Dvořák: Legends, Op. 59
- 79067 Musical Offering: Viva Vivaldi
- 79068 BSO Chamber Players: Brahms: String Quintets, Op. 88 and Op. 111
- 79071 The Sequoia String Quartet: Kurt Weill: String Quartets in B minor, No. 1
- 79072 Saint Louis Symphony Orchestra: Schwanter: Magabunda / Schuman: American Hymn
- 79078 Rochester Philharmonic Orchestra: JANACEK: Lachian Dances / DVORAK: Suite in A, Op. 98b
- 79101 Steve Reich: The Desert Music
- 79108 George Perle: Serenade No. 3 for Piano and Chamber Orchestra
- 79109 London Early Music Group: Rossi: Arias; Monteverdi: Arias; Cavalli: Arias; Carissimi: Cantatas
- 79111 Kronos Quartet: Kronos Quartet
- 79112 Bilson Malcolm, Luca Sergiu: Sonata for violin and piano n°36 in F major K.547
- 79113 Philip Glass: Mishima
- 79114 Carol Wincenc: Music of Griffes, Copland, Barber, Del Tredici, Foss, and Cowell
- 79115 John Adams: Harmonielehre
- 79116 Sérgio & Odair Assad: Latin American Music for Two Guitars
- 79117 Ani & Ida Kavafian: Mozart:Duo / Moszrowski: Suite / Sarasate: Navarra
- 79118 Saint Louis Symphony Orchestra: Rouse: The Infernal Machine / Tower: Sequoia / Erb: Prismatic Variations / Rouse: Ogoun Badagris
- 79120 Joan Morris & William Bolcom: Blue Skies: Songs of Irving Berlin
- 79122 Charles Rosen: Beethoven: Sonatas #12, 13, 14, Bagatelles, opus 119
- 79123 Paul O'Dette: Robin Is To The Greenwood Gone
- 79124 Richard Goode: Schubert: Sonatas for Piano, D960
- 79126 American Strings Quartet: Quartet for Strings No. 9, Op. 34 in D Minor
- 79127 Caetano Veloso: Caetano Veloso
- 79129 André Previn with John Harbison and the Pittsburgh Symphony Orchestra, – Ulysses' Bow/Samuel Chapter
- 79131 Teresa Stratas: Stratas Sings Weill
- 79132 John Gibbons: A Bach Recital
- 79133 Scott Johnson: John Somebody
- 79134 Boston Camerata; Joel Cohen, conductor: Renaissance Christmas
- 79135 New York City Ballet Orchestra: A Balanchine Album
- 79136 Robert Irving and the New York City Ballet Orchestra: Agon
- 79137 World Saxophone Quartet: Plays Duke Ellington
- 79138 Steve Reich: Sextet/Six Marimbas
- 79139 John Zorn: The Big Gundown: John Zorn Plays The Music Of Ennio Morricone
- 79143 Joseph Schwantner & Lucy Shelton: A Sudden Rainbow
- 79144 John Adams: The Chairman Dances
- 79145 New York Chamber Symphony, Gerard Schwarz, American String Quartet: Schoenberg: String Quartet Concerto (After Handel) / Strauss: Divertimento, Op. 86 (After Couperin)
- 79146 Ivan Moravec: Piano Music Of Smetana, Korte, Suk (Live In Prague)
- 79147 Stephen Paulus: Symphony in Three Movements / Libby Larsen: Symphony, Water Music
- 79148 Joan Morris & William Bolcom: After The Ball
- 79149 George Crumb: Ancient Voices of Children plus Makrokosmos III
- 79150 Various Artists: Percussion Works
- 79151 William Bolcom: George Gershwin: Piano Music and Songs
- 79152 Anner Bylsma & Malcolm Bilson: Beethoven: Cello Sonatas Nos. 1 & 2
- 79153 Stephen Albert: Flower of the Mountain / Into Eclipse
- 79154 Richard Goode: Richard Goode Plays Brahms
- 79155 Sergiu Luca & Malcolm Bilson: Mozart: Sonatas For Fortepiano & Violin, Vol 2
- 79156 The Consort Of Musicke: Welcome Every Guest: Songs From John Blow's Amphion Anglicus
- 79157 William Bolcom: Cornet Favorites/Highlights. From "Cousins"
- 79158 Jan DeGaetani & Gilbert Kalish: Foster: Songs Vol. 1 and 2
- 79159 Joshua Rifkin: Scott Joplin: Piano Rags
- 79160 Mieczyslaw Horszowski: Mozart/Chopin/Debussy/Beethoven
- 79161 Paul Jacobs: Debussy: Etudes for Piano, Books I & II / En Blanc et Noir, containing En blanc et noir
- 79162 Gilbert Kalish: Haydn: Piano Sonatas Hob. XVI
- 79163 Kronos Quartet: White Man Sleeps
- 79164 World Saxophone Quartet: Dances and Ballads
- 79165 Mystère des Voix Bulgares
- 79167 Various Artists: Dances of the World: Music from the Nonesuch Explorer Series
- 79168 BSO Chamber Players: Aaron Copland: Sextet; Piano Variations; Piano Quartet
- 79169 Steve Reich: Early Works
- 79170 Steve Reich: Drumming
- 79171 Various Artists: Late in the 20th Century: An Elektra/Nonesuch New Music Sampler
- 79172 John Zorn: Spillane
- 79173 Idjah Hadidjah: Tonggeret
- 79174 Astor Piazzolla: Concierto Para Bandoneon / Tres Tangos
- 79175 Irving Fine: Notturno, Partita, String Quartet, The Hour Glass
- 79176 Steve Reich: Different Trains/Electric Counterpoint (Kronos Quartet, Pat Metheny)
- 79177 John Adams: Nixon in China
- 79178 Jan DeGaetani & Gilbert Kalish: Songs of America - On Home, Love, Nature and Death
- 79179 Sergio & Odair Assad: Alma Brasileira
- 79180 Ensemble Alcatraz: Visions and Miracles
- 79181 Kronos Quartet: Winter Was Hard
- 79183 Paul Jacobs, Gilbert Kalish, Contemporary Chamber Ensemble; Arthur Weisberg, conductor: Elliott Carter: Sonata for Flute, Oboe Cello & Harpsichord
- 79185 Garrick Ohlsson and the San Francisco Symphony: Wuorinen: Piano Concerto, No. 3
- 79186 Scott Jacobs: Patty Hearst: Original Motion Picture Soundtrack
- 79187 Dawn Upshaw: Knoxville: Summer of 1915
- 79188 Leon Kirchner: Concerto for Violin, Cello, Winds, Percussion
- 79189 John Harbison: Simple Daylight
- 79191 Bob Telson: Gospel at Colonus
- 79192 Philip Glass: Powaqqatsi
- 79193 John Adams: Music from Nixon in China
- 79195 Village Music of Bulgaria: In the Shadow of the Mountain
- 79196 Bali: Balinese Explorer Compilation (Explorer Series)
- 79197 Peru: Kingdom of the Sun - Peru's Inca Heritage (Explorer Series)
- 79198 Tibet: Tibetan Explorer Compilation (Explorer Series)
- 79200 Edward Aldwell: J.S. Bach: The Well-Tempered Clavier, Book II
- 79201 Le Mystère des Voix Bulgares, Vol. 2
- 79202 Mieczyslaw Horszowski: Mozart/Chopin/Schumann
- 79203 Portugal: Guitarra Portuguesa / Paredes (Explorer Series)
- 79204 Bali: Music of Bali (David Lewiston) (Explorer Series)
- 79205 Akiko Yano: Akiko Yano
- 79209 Philip Glass: The Thin Blue Line
- 79210 Various Artists: Wings of Desire Soundtrack
- 79211 Richard Goode: Beethoven: The Late Sonatas
- 79212 Richard Goode: Beethoven: The Op. 31 Piano Sonatas
- 79213 Richard Goode: Beethoven: The Op. 10 Piano Sonatas
- 79216 Astor Piazzolla and the New Tango Quintet: La Camorra II
- 79217 Kronos Quartet: Kronos Quartet Plays Terry Riley: Salome Dances for Peace
- 79218 John Adams: Fearful Symmetries/The Wound-Dresser
- 79219 John Adams: Chamber Symphony/Grand Pianola Music
- 79220 Steve Reich: The Four Sections/Music for Mallet Instruments, Voices & Organ
- 79221 Various Artists: Late In The 20th Century II: New Recordings from Elektra/Nonesuch-Elektra/Musician-Nonesuch Explorer
- 79222 Jan DeGaetani & Contemporary Chamber Ensemble; Arthur Weisberg, conductor: Spectrum: New American Music
- 79224 Rustavi Choir: Georgian Voices
- 79225 Philip Tabane and Malombo: Unh!
- 79227 Ingram Marshall: Three Penitential Visions
- 79228 Andrzej Panufnik: Arbor Cosmica / Sinfonia Sacra
- 79229 William Kraft: Contextures II: The Final Beast / Interplay / Of Ceremonies, Pageants and Celebrations
- 79230 Baltimore Symphony Orchestra: Christopher Rouse: Symphony No. 1 Phantasmanta
- 79231 Alvin Singleton: Shadows / After Fallen Crumbs / A Yellow Rose Petal
- 79232 Mieczyslaw Horszowski: Beethoven/Chopin/Bach
- 79233 Ivan Moravec: Chopin: The Complete Nocturnes
- 79234 Vladimir Viardo: Shostakovich: Twenty-four Preludes, Piano Sonata No. 2
- 79235 Various Artists: Imaginary Landscapes: New Electronic Music
- 79236 Anner Bylsma & Malcolm Bilson: Beethoven: Cello Sonatas Vol II
- 79237 Jan DeGaetani & Gilbert Kalish: Schoenberg: Pierrot Lunaire/The Book of the Hanging Gardens
- 79238 John Zorn: Naked City
- 79239 Various Artists: Gipsy Original Soundtrack
- 79240 Ensemble Alcatraz: Danse Royale
- 79241 Abed Azrie: Aromates
- 79242 Kronos Quartet: Black Angels
- 79243 Michael Feinstein: Michael Feinstein Sings the Burton Lane Songbook, Vol. 1
- 79245 Joan Tower: Silver Ladders / Island Prelude / Music for Cello and Orchestra / Sequoia
- 79246 Tobias Picker: Symphony No. 2 / String Quartet No. 1
- 79248 Jan DeGaetani, Gilbert Kalish, Paul Jacobs, New York Chamber Symphony of the 92nd Street Y, Gerard Schwarz, conductor: Elliott Carter: The Minotaur
- 79249 John Adams: American Elegies
- 79250 George Gershwin & Ira Gershwin: Girl Crazy
- 79251 Louis Andriessen: De Staat
- 79252 Various Artists: Elektra Nonesuch Sampler
- 79253 Kronos Quartet: Hunting Gathering: Volans
- 79254 Kronos Quartet: Astor Piazzolla: Five Tango Sensations
- 79255 Kronos Quartet: Witold Lutoslawski: String Quartet
- 79256 Ken Burns: The Civil War: Original Soundtrack Recording
- 79257 Henryk Górecki: Already It Is Dusk; Lerchenmusik
- 79258 World Saxophone Quartet: Metamorphosis
- 79259 Sanford Sylvan & David Breitman: Beloved That Pilgrimage: Songs of Barber, Chanler and Copland
- 79260 Kronos Quartet: The Collection
- 79261 Mieczyslaw Horszowski: Bach: English Suite No. 5 In E-Minor BWW 810 / Chopin: Two Nocturnes / Beethoven: Sonata No. 6 In F-Major, Op. 10, No. 2
- 79262 Dawn Upshaw: Girl with the Orange Lips - Ravel, de Falla, et al.
- 79263 Jan DeGaetani, Gilbert Kalish: Schubert: Songs; Wolf: Songs from the Spanische Liederbuch
- 79264 Mieczyslaw Horszowski: Bach/Schumann/Chopin
- 79265 Boston Camerata; Joel Cohen, conductor: A Baroque Christmas
- 79267 Various: Wiener - Musik Für Ein Neues Zeitalter
- 79270 John Zorn: Filmworks 1986-1990
- 79271 Richard Goode: Schubert: Sonatas for Piano: D845; D850
- 79272 Edward Aldwell: J.S. Bach: The Well-Tempered Clavier, Book I
- 79273 George Gershwin: Strike Up the Band
- 79274 Michael Feinstein: Michael Feinstein Sings the Jule Styne Songbook
- 79275 Kronos Quartet: Pieces of Africa
- 79277 Caetano Veloso: Circulado
- 79278 Wayne Horvitz: The President: Miracle Mile
- 79279 Akiko Yano: Love Life
- 79280 Don Byron: Tuskegee Experiments
- 79281 John Adams: The Death of Klinghoffer
- 79282 Henryk Górecki: Symphony No. 3 (Dawn Upshaw, London Sinfonietta; David Zinman, conductor)
- 79283 Vladimir Viardo: Rachmaninoff: Variations on a Theme of Corelli
- 79285 Michael Feinstein: Michael Feinstein Sings the Burton Lane Songbook, Vol. 2
- 79286 Philip Glass: Hydrogen Jukebox
- 79287 George Gershwin: Gershwin Plays Gershwin
- 79288 Dawn Upshaw: Henryk Górecki: Symphony No. 3
- 79289 Robert Ashley: Improvement: An Opera for Television
- 79290 Giya Kancheli: Symphony No. 5
- 79291 Louis Andriessen: De Tijd
- 79292 Sérgio & Odair Assad: Scarlatti, Rameau, Couperin Transcriptions
- 79293 Sanford Sylvan: Schubert: Die schöne Müllerin
- 79294 New York City Ballet Orchestra: The Nutcracker: Original Soundtrack featuring Kevin Kline
- 79295 Steve Reich: Tehillim
- 79299 Gipsy Kings: Tierra Gitana
- 79300 The Real Bahamas, Vols. 1 & 2 (Explorer Series)
- 79301 Bill Frisell: Have a Little Faith
- 79303 Boston Camerata; Joel Cohen, conductor: With Joyful Voice
- 79308 George Gershwin & Ira Gershwin: Lady, Be Good
- 79309 World Saxophone Quartet: You Don't Know Me
- 79309 World Saxophone Quartet: Breath of Life
- 79310 Kronos Quartet: Short Stories
- 79311 John Adams: Hoodoo Zephyr
- 79312 Kronos Quartet: Collection II
- 79313 Don Byron: Don Byron Plays the Music of Mickey Katz
- 79314 Michael Feinstein: Sings the Hugh Martin Songbook
- 79315 Michael Feinstein: Sings the Jerry Herman Songbook
- 79316 Bill Frisell: This Land
- 79317 Dawn Upshaw & Richard Goode: Goethe Lieder
- 79318 Kronos Quartet: At the Grave of Richard Wagner
- 79319 Kronos Quartet: Henryk Górecki: String Quartets, Nos. 1 & 2
- 79320 Kronos Quartet: Morton Feldman: Piano & String Quartet
- 79323 Philip Glass: Einstein on the Beach
- 79324 Philip Glass: Music in 12 Parts
- 79325 Philip Glass: Music with Changing Parts
- 79326 Philip Glass: Two Pages; Contrary Motion; Music In Fifths; Music In Similar Motion
- 79327 Steve Reich: The Cave
- 79328 Richard Goode: Beethoven: The Complete Sonatas
- 79329 Philip Glass: Anima Mundi
- 79330 Mandy Patinkin: Experiment
- 79331 New York City Ballet Orchestra: Tchaikovsky: The Nutcracker
- 79332 Kronos Quartet: Bob Ostertag: All the Rage
- 79334 Various Artists: Fearless
- 79335 Pokrovsky Ensemble: Les Noces
- 79337 Derek Jarman: Blue
- 79338 George Gershwin & Ira Gershwin: Pardon My English
- 79339 Caetano Veloso & Gilberto Gil: Tropicalia 2
- 79340 Ken Burns: Baseball Soundtrack
- 79341 Dmitry Sitkovetsky: Goldberg Variations
- 79342 Louis Andriessen: De Stijl
- 79345 Dawn Upshaw: I Wish It So
- 79346 Kronos Quartet: Night Prayers
- 79347 Philip Glass: La Belle et la Bete
- 79348 Henryk Górecki: Miserere
- 79349 Le Mystère des Voix Bulgares: Ritual
- 79350 Bill Frisell: Music For The Films Of Buster Keaton: Go West
- 79351 Bill Frisell: Music For The Films Of Buster Keaton: The High Sign/One Week
- 79352 Dawn Upshaw: I Wish It So
- 79353 Jelly Roll Morton: Tom Cat Blues
- 79354 Don Byron: Music for Six Musicians
- 79356 Kronos Quartet: Kronos Quartet Performs Philip Glass: String Quartets 2, 3, 4 and 5
- 79357 Fontella Bass: No Ways Tired
- 79358 Gipsy Kings: The Best of the Gipsy Kings
- 79359 John Adams: El Dorado
- 79360 John Adams: Violin Concerto/Shaker Loops
- 79361 George Gershwin & Ira Gershwin: Oh, Kay!
- 79362 Henryk Górecki: Kleines Requiem für eine Polka / Harpsichord Concerto / Good Night
- 79363 Jelly Roll Morton: Piano Rolls
- 79364 Dawn Upshaw: White Moon: Songs to Morpheus
- 79365 Sérgio & Odair Assad: Saga dos Migrantes
- 79366 Robin Holcomb: Little Three
- 79367 Louis Andriessen: De Materie
- 79370 George Gershwin: The Piano Rolls, Vol. 2
- 79371 Sanford Sylvan: L'Horizon Chimerique
- 79372 Kronos Quartet: Howl U.S.A.
- 79374 Le Mystère des Voix Bulgares: Complete Box Set, Vol. 1-2/Ritual
- 79375 Various artists: Late Night Concerts
- 79376 Steve Reich and Michael Tilson Thomas
- 79377 Philip Glass: Filmworks
- 79382 Javanese Court Gamelan
- 79391 Richard Goode: Beethoven: Piano Sonatas Nos. 21, 22, 23
- 79392 Mandy Patinkin: Oscar and Steve
- 79393 Dawn Upshaw: Portrait
- 79394 Kronos Quartet: Released 1985 - 1995
- 79395 Fred Hersch: Passion Flower (Fred Hersch Plays Billy Strayhorn)
- 79399 Gipsy Kings: Tierra Gitana
- 79400 Leonard Bernstein: Leonard Bernstein's New York
- 79401 Bill Frisell: Quartet
- 79402 Leonard Rosenman: East of Eden / Rebel Without a Cause
- 79404 Toru Takemitsu: The Film Music of Toru Takemitsu
- 79405 Georges Delerue: Truffaut Film Music
- 79406 Dawn Upshaw: Sings Rodgers & Hart
- 79407 Gidon Kremer: Hommage à Piazzolla
- 79414 Fred Hersch: Plays Rodgers & Hammerstein
- 79415 Bill Frisell: Nashville
- 79416 Akiko Yano: Piano Nightly
- 79418 Paul Jacobs: Piano Music
- 79420 Paul Jacobs: Schoenberg: Piano Music
- 79421 Edgard Varèse: Contemporary Chamber Ensemble
- 79422 Zoltán Kodály with Jerry Grossman and Daniel Phillips: Sonata For Solo Cello, Op. 8 / Duo For Violin & Cello, Op. 7
- 79423 Jeffrey Kahane: Bach: Partita No. 4 In D Major/Three-Part Inventions (Sinfonias)
- 79424 Arnold Schoenberg with New York Chamber Symphony, Gerard Schwarz and American String Quartet: String Quartet Concerto (After Handel) / Divertimento, Op. 86 (After Couperin)
- 79426 Kurt Weill: Kleine Dreigroschenmusik/Darius Milhaud: La Création du Monde
- 79429 Varttina: Kokko
- 79430 Steve Reich: City Life / Proverb / Nagoya Marimbas
- 79434 Adam Guettel: Floyd Collins
- 79436 John Adams: Music From Nixon In China (reissue)
- 79437 Original Cast Recording: Girl Crazy
- 79438 Don Byron: Bug Music
- 79439 Richard Goode & Orpheus Chamber Orchestra: Mozart: Piano Concertos Nos. 18 & 20
- 79441 Gipsy Kings: Tierra Gitana: A PBS Music Documentary
- 79442 Philip Glass: Secret Agent
- 79444 Kronos Quartet: The Dream and Prayers of Isaac the Blind
- 79445 Kronos Quartet: Tan Dun: Ghost Opera
- 79446 Alex North: The Bad Seed/Spartacus/A Street Car Named Desire
- 79447 Last Forever: Last Forever
- 79448 Steve Reich: Music For 18 Musicians
- 79449 Joshua Rifkin: The Entertainer: The Very Best of Scott Joplin
- 79451 Steve Reich: Works: 1965-1995
- 79452 Richard Goode: Chopin: Polonaise - Fantasie Op. 61
- 79453 John Adams: Earbox
- 79454 Richard Goode & Orpheus Chamber Orchestra: Mozart: Piano Concertos 9 & 25
- 79455 Iva Bittová: Iva Bittová
- 79456 Fred Hersch: Thelonious (Fred Hersch Plays Monk)
- 79457 Kronos Quartet: Early Music
- 79458 Dawn Upshaw: The World So Wide
- 79459 Mandy Patinkin: Mamaloshen
- 79460 Philip Glass: Kundun Soundtrack
- 79461 Gustavo Santaolalla: Ronroco
- 79462 Gidon Kremer: Piazzolla: El Tango
- 79463 John Adams: I Was Looking at the Ceiling and Then I Saw the Sky
- 79464 Nadja Salerno-Sonnenberg: Humoresque
- 79465 John Adams: Gnarly Buttons / Alleged Dances (Kronos Quartet)
- 79466 Gipsy Kings: Compas
- 79468 Bill Frisell/Fred Hersch: Songs We Know
- 79469 Astor Piazzolla: Tango Zero Hour
- 79470 Oumou Sangaré: Worotan
- 79471 Cheikh Lô: Ne La Thiass
- 79472 Radio Tarifa: Rumba Argelina
- 79473 John Adams: I Was Looking At The Ceiling And Then I Saw The Sky
- 79474 Paul Jacobs: Preludes For Piano - Books I & II
- 79475 Rokia Traoré: Né So
- 79476 Afro-Cuban All Stars: A Toda Cuba Le Gusta
- 79477 Rubén González: Introducing...Rubén González
- 79478 Buena Vista Social Club: Buena Vista Social Club
- 79479 Bill Frisell: Gone, Just Like a Train
- 79481 Steve Reich: New York Counterpoint / Eight Lines / Four Organs
- 79482 Audra McDonald: Way Back to Paradise
- 79483 Richard Goode: Bach Partitas
- 79485 John Adams: John's Book of Alleged Dances for String Quartet and Electronics/Gnarly Buttons for Clarinet and Ensemble
- 79486 Philip Glass: Symphony No. 2
- 79487 Philip Glass: the CIVIL WarS: The Rome Section - A Tree Is Best Measured When It Is Down
- 79489 Richard Goode & Orpheus Chamber Orchestra: Mozart: Piano Concertos Nos. 23 & 24
- 79490 Kronos Quartet: Caravan
- 79494 Toru Takemitsu: Music from Dodes'ka-den
- 79496 Philip Glass: Symphony No. 2, Interlude From Orphee
- 79497 Sierra Maestra: Tibiri Tabara
- 79498 George Gershwin & Ira Gershwin: Standards & Gems
- 79499 Radio Tarifa: Temporal
- 79500 Kronos Quartet: Alfred Schnittke: Complete String Quartets
- 79501 Afro-Cuban All Stars: Distanto, Differente
- 79503 Rubén González: Chanchullo
- 79504 Kronos Quartet: 25 Years (10-CD Set)
- 79505 Sérgio & Odair Assad, Nadja Salerno-Sonnenberg: Nadja Salerno-Sonnenberg, Sérgio & Odair Assad
- 79506 Philip Glass: Koyaanisqatsi
- 79508 Mandy Patinkin: Mamaloshen
- 79509 Cesaria Evora: Miss Perfumado
- 79510 Gipsy Kings: Cantos de Amor
- 79512 Paolo Conte: Best of Paolo Conte
- 79515 Astor Piazzolla: The Rough Dancer and the Cyclical Night
- 79516 Astor Piazzolla: La Camorra: The Solitude of Passionate Provocation
- 79517 Compay Segundo: Lo Mejor de la Vida
- 79519 Philip Glass: Koyaanisqatsi
- 79525 Astor Piazzolla: Rough Dancer and the Cyclical Night (Tango Apasionado)
- 79530 Adam Guettel: Myths and Hymns
- 79531 Dawn Upshaw: Sings Vernon Duke
- 79532 Ibrahim Ferrer: Buena Vista Social Club Presents Ibrahim Ferrer
- 79533 Cesaria Evora: Mar Azul
- 79534 Mandy Patinkin: Kidults
- 79536 Bill Frisell: Good Dog, Happy Man
- 79539 Laurie Anderson: Life on a String
- 79541 Gipsy Kings: Volare: The Very Best of the Gipsy Kings
- 79542 Philip Glass: Dracula
- 79545 Dmitry Sitkovetsky: Brahms: Sextet No. 2 / Dohnányi: Serenade
- 79546 Steve Reich/Kronos Quartet: Triple Quartet
- 79549 John Adams: Harmonium
- 79551 Estrellas de Areito: Los Heroes
- 79552 Steve Reich: Reich (Remixed)
- 79553 Michael Gordon: Weather
- 79554 Taraf de Haïdouks: Taraf de Haidouks
- 79557 Caetano Veloso: Livro
- 79558 Fred Hersch: Let Yourself Go (Live at Jordan Hall)
- 79559 Louis Andriessen: Rosa - The Death of a Composer
- 79560 Nico Muhly: Two Boys
- 79567 Afel Bocoum: Alkibar
- 79568 Gidon Kremer: Eight Seasons
- 79569 Ali Farka Touré: Radio Mali
- 79570 Cheikh Lô: Bambay Gueej
- 79572 Los Zafiros: Bossa Cubana
- 79575 Oumou Sangaré: Moussolou
- 79576 Oumou Sangaré: Ko Sira
- 79578 Compay Segundo: Calle Salud
- 79579 Caetano Veloso: Orfeu [Soundtrack]
- 79580 Audra McDonald: How Glory Goes
- 79581 Philip Glass: Symphony No. 3 / Music From "The Voyage" & "The Civil Wars" / The Light
- 79582 Gidon Kremer: Silencio
- 79583 Bill Frisell: Ghost Town
- 79584 Kronos Quartet: Dracula
- 79586 Chris Thile and Mandoline: Partita Nr.1 in h-moll BWV 1002 / daraus: Double - 4.Satz
- 79596 Audra McDonald: Live at the Donmar, London
- 79597 Devendra Banhart: The Ballad Of Keenan Milton
- 79599 Caetano Veloso: Omaggio A Federico E Giulietta - Ao Vivo
- 79601 Gidon Kremer: Tracing Astor
- 79603 Omara Portuondo: Buena Vista Social Club Presents Omara Portuondo
- 79604 Last Forever: Trainfare Home
- 79605 Dawn Upshaw Sings Bach and Purcell: Angels Hide Their Faces
- 79607 John Adams: Century Rolls
- 79608 Richard Goode & Orpheus Chamber Orchestra: Mozart: Mozart: Piano Concertos Nos. 19 & 27
- 79609 Stephen Sondheim: Saturday Night
- 79611 Kronos Quartet: Requiem for a Dream (Soundtrack; Music by Clint Mansell)
- 79612 Fred Hersch: Songs Without Words
- 79613 Ingram Marshall: Kingdom Come
- 79614 Duncan Sheik: Phantom Moon
- 79615 Bill Frisell: Blues Dream
- 79616 Emmylou Harris: Red Dirt Girl
- 79617 Youssou N'Dour: Joko (The Link)
- 79618 Philip Glass: Symphony No. 5
- 79619 Teresa Sterne: A Portrait
- 79623 Frederic Rzewski: Rzewski Plays Rzewski
- 79624 Bill Frisell: Bill Frisell with Dave Holland and Elvin Jones
- 79625 Sam Phillips: Fan Dance
- 79626 Ricky Ian Gordon: Bright-Eyed Joy
- 79627 Kronos Quartet: Music of Vladimir Martynov
- 79628 Brad Mehldau Trio: Ode
- 79629 Radio Tarifa: Cruzando El Río
- 79632 Sérgio & Odair Assad: Sérgio & Odair Assad Play Piazzolla
- 79633 Gidon Kremer: After Mozart
- 79634 John Adams: El Niño
- 79635 Stephen Sondheim: Company
- 79636 John Adams: Naive and Sentimental Music
- 79637 Various: Music From The Motion Picture Big Bad Love
- 79638 Stephen Sondheim: The Frogs / Evening Primrose
- 79639 Kronos Quartet: Requiem for Adam / Terry Riley
- 79640 Wilco: War On War
- 79641 Taraf de Haïdouks: Band Of Gypsies
- 79644 Carmine Coppola & Francis Coppola: Apocalypse Now Redux Soundtrack
- 79645 Audra MacDonald: Private Passions
- 79646 Sam Phillips: Fan Dance: Border Edition
- 79648 Laurie Anderson: Rumba Club
- 79649 Kronos Quartet: Nuevo
- 79650 Ibrahim Ferrer: Buenos Hermanos
- 79652 Bill Frisell: The Willies
- 79653 Robin Holcomb: The Big Time
- 79654 Youssou N'Dour: Coono Du Reer
- 79656 Various: Dreamgirls In Concert
- 79657 Gidon Kremer and Kremerata Baltica: Happy Birthday
- 79660 Philip Glass: Philip on Film
- 79661 Bill Frisell: The Intercontinentals
- 79662 Steve Reich with Beryl Korot - Three Tales
- 79663 Youssou N'Dour: Coono Du Reer (reissue of 79654)
- 79664 Youssou N'Dour with Pascal Obispo: So Many Men
- 79666 Wilco: More Like The Moon
- 79669 Wilco: Yankee Hotel Foxtrot
- 79670 Samuel Barber, Irving Fine, Elliott Carter and David Diamond: American Music For Strings (Apex)
- 79671 American String Quartet: Dvorak: String Quartets, Opp. 34 & 51 (Apex)
- 79672 Zoltan Kodaly: Sonata for Solo Cello (Apex)
- 79673 Paul Jacobs: Piano Music (Apex)
- 79674 Claude Debussy: Images, Estampes (Apex)
- 79675 Schoenberg: String Quartet Concerto (Apex)
- 79676 David Zinman and the Rochester Philharmonic Orchestra: Dvorak - Ten Legends (Apex)
- 79677 David Zinman and the Rochester Philharmonic Orchestra: Janáček: Lachian Dances/Dvořák: Suite in A Major (Apex)
- 79678 Aaron Copland with Boston Symphony Chamber Players and Gilbert Kalish: Sextet/Piano Variations/Piano Quartet (Apex)
- 79680 Los Angeles Chamber Orchestra and Gerard Schwarz: Idyla (Idyll) For String Orchestra/Mládí (Youth) For Wind Sextet (Apex)
- 79681 Laurie Anderson: Live in New York
- 79682 Kremerata Baltica: Enescu: String Octet, Op. 7; Piano Quintet in A minor, Op. 29
- 79683 The Magnetic Fields: I
- 79684 Gaby Kerpel: Carnabailito
- 79685 Orchestra Baobab: Specialist In All Styles
- 79686 Broadway Revival Cast: Into the Woods
- 79689 Randy Newman: The Randy Newman Songbook Vol. 2
- 79690 Mandy Patinkin: Mandy Patinkin Sings Sondheim
- 79691 Ry Cooder and Manuel Galbán: Mambo Sinuendo
- 79692 Lorraine Hunt Lieberson: Bach Cantatas BWV 82 & 199
- 79693 Philip Glass: Music From The Motion Picture The Hours
- 79694 Youssou N'Dour: Egypt
- 79695 Kronos Quartet: Fourth String Quartet
- 79696 Kronos Quartet with Dawn Upshaw: Alban Berg/Lyric Suite
- 79697 Kronos Quartet With David Barron: Harry Partch: U.S. Highball
- 79698 Richard Goode: Bach Partitas Nos. 1, 3 & 6
- 79699 John Adams: Road Movies
- 79701 Explorer Series: Africa: Ghana: High-Life & Other Popular Music (reissue)
- 79702 Explorer Series: Africa: Nubia: Escalay (The Water Wheel): Oud Music (Hamza El Din) (reissue)
- 79703 Explorer Series: Africa: Zimbabwe: The African Mbira / Music of the Shona People (reissue)
- 79704 Explorer Series: Africa: Zimbabwe: The Soul of Mbira / Traditions of the Shona People (reissue)
- 79705 Explorer Series: Africa: Animals of Africa: Sounds of the Jungle, Plain & Bush (reissue)
- 79706 Explorer Series: Africa: Burundi: Music from the Heart of Africa (reissue)
- 79707 Explorer Series: Africa: East Africa: Ceremonial & Folk Music (reissue)
- 79708 Explorer Series: Africa: East Africa: Witchcraft & Ritual Music (reissue)
- 79709 Explorer Series: Africa: West Africa: Drum, Chant & Instrumental Music (reissue)
- 79710 Explorer Series: Africa: Zimbabwe: Shona Mbira Music (reissue)
- 79711 Explorer Series: Africa: Ghana: Ancient Ceremonies / Dance Music & Songs (reissue)
- 79712 Explorer Series: Africa: Burkina Faso: Savannah Rhythms (reissue)
- 79713 Explorer Series: Africa: Burkina Faso: Rhythms of the Grasslands (reissue)
- 79714 Explorer Series: Indonesia: Bali: Music from the Morning of the World (reissue)
- 79715 Explorer Series: South Pacific: Tahiti: The Gauguin Years: Songs and Dances (reissue)
- 79716 Explorer Series: Indonesia: Bali: Golden Rain (reissue)
- 79717 Explorer Series: Indonesia: Java: The Jasmine Isle / Gamelan Music (reissue)
- 79718 Explorer Series: Indonesia: Bali: Music for the Shadow Play (reissue)
- 79719 Explorer Series: Indonesia: Java: Court Gamelan (reissue)
- 79720 Explorer Series: Indonesia: Bali: Gamelan Semar Pegulingan / Gamelan of the Love God (reissue)
- 79721 Explorer Series: Indonesia: Java: Court Gamelan, Volume II (reissue)
- 79722 Explorer Series: Indonesia: Java: Court Gamelan, Volume III (reissue)
- 79723 Explorer Series: South Pacific: Island Music (reissue)
- 79724 Explorer Series: Latin America: Mexico: The Real Mexico in Music and Song (reissue)
- 79725 Explorer Series: Caribbean: The Bahamas: The Real Bahamas in Music and Song (reissue)
- 79726 Explorer Series: Caribbean: Trinidad: The Sound of the Sun / The Westland Steel Band (reissue)
- 79727 Explorer Series: Latin America: Paraguay: Guaraní Songs & Dances (Los Chiriguanos) (reissue)
- 79728 Explorer Series: Latin America: Peru: Kingdom of the Sun / The Inca Heritage (reissue)
- 79729 Explorer Series: Latin America: South America: Black Music in Praise of Oxalá and Other Gods (reissue)
- 79730 Explorer Series: Latin America: Peru: Fiestas: Music of the High Andes (reissue)
- 79731 Explorer Series: Caribbean: Island Songs and Dances (reissue)
- 79732 Explorer Series: Latin America: Mexico: Fiestas of Chiapas and Oaxaca (reissue)
- 79733 Explorer Series: Caribbean: The Bahamas: The Real Bahamas, Volume II (reissue)
- 79734 Explorer Series: Caribbean: West Indies: An Island Carnival (reissue)
- 79776 Philip Glass: Mishima (reissue)
- 79786 Ben Folds and Nick Hornby: Lonely Avenue
- 79787 Henryk Gorecki: Symphony No. 3
- 79793 Explorer Series: Africa: Music from the Nonesuch Explorer Series
- 79794 Explorer Series: Indonesia: Music from the Nonesuch Explorer Series
- 79801 Michael Gordon: Light Is Calling
- 79803 Gidon Kremer & Kremerata Baltica: The Russian Seasons
- 79804 Kronos Quartet: Mugam Sayagi, Music of Franghiz Ali-Zadeh
- 79805 Emmylou Harris: Stumble Into Grace
- 79807 Sam Phillips: A Boot and a Shoe
- 79808 Caetano Veloso: The Best of Caetano Veloso
- 79809 Wilco: A ghost is born
- 79810 Manuel "Guajiro" Mirabal: Buena Vista Social Club Presents Manuel 'Guajiro' Mirabal
- 79811 Omara Portuondo: Flor de amor
- 79812 Dawn Upshaw: Voices of Light
- 79813 Punch-Drunk Love Soundtrack
- 79814 Bali: Gamelan and Kecak
- 79815 West Java: Sundanese Jaipong
- 79816 John Adams: On the Transmigration of Souls
- 79817 Joni Mitchell: Travelogue
- 79818 Paolo Conte: Rêveries
- 79819 Viktor Krauss: Far From Enough
- 79821 Youssou N'Dour with Joy Denalane: So Many Men
- 79822 Radio Tarifa: Fiebre
- 79823 Caetano Veloso: A Foreign Sound
- 79826 David Byrne: Grown Backwards
- 79827 Oumou Sangare: oumou
- 79828 Bill Frisell: Unspeakable
- 79829 Adam Guettel: The Light in the Piazza
- 79830 Stephen Sondheim: Bounce
- 79831 Richard Goode: Mozart
- 79832 Joshua Rifkin: The Baroque Beatles Book
- 79835 Steve Reich and Beryl Korot: Three Tales (w/ DVD)
- 79836 Anner Bylsma and Malcolm Bilson: Beethoven: Cello Sonata No 3 in A Major, Op. 69: 3rd mvt.
- 79837 Thomas Newman: Angels in America Soundtrack
- 79838 George Balanchine: Choreography by Balanchine - Tzigane / Andante, Divertimento No. 15 / The Four Temperaments / Selections from Jewels / Stravinsky Violin Concerto (DVD)
- 79839 George Balanchine: Choreography by Balanchine - Chaconne / Prodigal Son / Ballo della Regina / The Steadfast Tin Soldier / Elégie / Tschaikovsky Pas de Deux (DVD)
- 79841 Gipsy Kings: Roots
- 79842 Youssou N'Dour: Egypt (reissue)
- 79843 Richard Goode: Johann Sebastian Bach: Partita nr 4 D-dur BVW 828
- 79844 The Magnetic Fields: I Thought You Were My Boyfriend (Remixes by Rob Rives)
- 79846 Brian Wilson: SMiLE
- 79847 k.d. lang: Hymns of the 49th Parallel
- 79852 Rokia Traoré: Bowmboï
- 79853 Brad Mehldau: Live in Tokyo
- 79854 Laura Veirs: Carbon Glacier
- 79856 Kronos Quartet & Asha Bhosle: You've Stolen My Heart: Songs from R.D. Burman's Bollywood
- 79857 John Adams: The Dharma at Big Sur / My Father Knew Charles Ives
- 79860 Stephin Merritt: Pieces of April (Soundtrack)
- 79862 Audra McDonald: Build a Bridge
- 79863 Bill Frisell: East/West
- 79864 Joshua Redman Elastic Band: Momentum
- 79866 SFJAZZ Collective: SFJAZZ Collective
- 79873 Fire Snakes: Year of Meteors
- 79876 Pat Metheny: The Way Up
- 79877 Ry Cooder: Chávez Ravine
- 79880 Angelo Badalamenti: A Very Long Engagement
- 79882 Ali Farka Touré: Red & Green
- 79884 Brian Wilson: Good Vibrations / In Blue Hawaii
- 79886 Kremerata Baltica and Gidon Kremer: Mozart: Violin Concerto No.4 in D major, K.218
- 79887 Louis Andriessen: Writing to Vermeer
- 79891 Steve Reich: You Are (Variations)
- 79892 Wilco: A Ghost Is Born
- 79893 Laura Veirs: Year of Meteors
- 79894 Brian Eno & David Byrne: My Life in the Bush of Ghosts
- 79897 Bill Frisell: Bill Frisell, Ron Carter, Paul Motian
- 79899 Stephin Merritt: Showtunes
- 79901 Kronos Quartet: The Fountain (Soundtrack; Music by Clint Mansell)
- 79902 Jeff Tweedy: Sunken Treasure: Live in the Pacific Northwest (DVD)
- 79903 Wilco: Kicking Television: Live in Chicago
- 79910 Brad Mehldau Trio: Day Is Done
- 79911 Brad Mehldau Trio: House on Hill
- 79912 Amadou & Mariam: Dimanche à Bamako
- 79913 Bill Frisell: Further East / Further West
- 79914 Brian Wilson: SMiLE (HDCD)
- 79918 Pat Metheny & Ornette Coleman: Song X: 20th Anniversary
- 79920 Ali Farka Touré & Toumani Diabaté: In the Heart of the Moon
- 79925 Kate & Anna McGarrigle: The McGarrigle Christmas Hour
- 79927 Glenn Kotche: Mobile
- 79929 Laura Veirs: Galaxies
- 79930 SFJAZZ Collective: SFJAZZ Collective 2
- 79933 Kenny Garrett: Beyond the Wall
- 79934 Various Artists: Our New Orleans
- 79937 Shawn Colvin: These Four Walls
- 79938 Cheikh Lô: Lamp Fall
- 79940 Pat Metheny: Letter from Home
- 79941 Pat Metheny: The Road to You
- 79943 Stephin Merritt: The Orphan of Zhao
- 79944 Stephin Merritt: Peach Blossom Fan
- 79945 Stephin Merritt: My Life As a Fairy Tale
- 79946 Stephen Sondheim: Sweeney Todd (2006 Broadway Cast Recording)
- 79948 Pat Metheny: Still Life (Talking)
- 79949 k.d. lang: Watershed
- 79951 Stephin Merritt: The Gothic Archies: The Tragic Treasury
- 79952 Brad Mehldau: Love Sublime (with Renée Fleming)
- 79953 Toumani Diabaté: Boulevard de l'Indépendance
- 79954 Lorraine Hunt Lieberson: Neruda Songs
- 79955 Pat Metheny: We Live Here
- 79956 Pat Metheny: Quartet
- 79959 Gipsy Kings: Pasajero
- 79961 Ry Cooder: My Name Is Buddy
- 79962 Steve Reich: Phases (5-CD Set)
- 79964 Pat Metheny & Brad Mehldau: Metheny Mehldau
- 79964 Ali Farka Touré: Savane
- 79966 Scritti Politti: White Bread Black Beer
- 79967 The Black Keys: Magic Potion
- 79969 Kremerata Baltica, Gidon Kremer, Georgs Pelēcis: Flowering Jasmine
- 79974 The Black Keys: Your Touch: The EP
- 79981 Caetano Veloso: Cê
- 79984 Wilco: Sky Blue Sky
- 79987 Various Artists: The Nonesuch Collection, Vol. 1
- 79988 Steve Reich: Reich: Remixed (2006)
- 79989 Randy Newman: Harps and Angels
- 79990 Shawn Colvin: Let It Slide
- 79993 Henryk Górecki & Kronos Quartet: Henryk Górecki: String Quartet No. 3 ('...songs are sung')
- 79994 Sevendust: Alpha
- 79995 Calico: [Chopped & Screwed]
- 79997 Payroll: Money, Mack and Murder
- 79999 Lil Bootie and Webbie: Survival Of The Fittest
- 85502 Compay Segundo: Las Flores de la Vida

=== Non-sequential numbering ===
- 104188 Pat Metheny & Brad Mehldau: Quartet
- 104252 Joshua Redman: Back East
- 104316 Laura Veirs: Saltbreakers
- 105084 Laurie Anderson: Homeland
- 110460 k.d. lang: Watershed
- 122620: Joni Mitchell & Various Artists: A Tribute to Joni Mitchell
- 122812 Randy Newman: Harps and Angels
- 130364 Explorer Series: East Asia: Japan: Shakuhachi Music / A Bell Ringing in the Empty Sky
- 130428 Laurie Anderson: Big Science (reissue)
- 131388 Wilco: Sky Blue Sky
- 139068 Ibrahim Ferrer: Mi Sueño
- 139132 Various Artists: World Circuit Presents
- 171644 Wilco: Sky Blue Sky (Deluxe CD + DVD)
- 181732 Punch Brothers: Punch
- 192572 Pat Metheny: Secret Story
- 254652 Christina Courtin: Christina Courtin
- 257020 Sam Phillips: Don't Do Anything
- 257084 Fernando Otero: Pagina de Buenos Aires
- 266044 Youssou N'Dour: Rokku Mi Rokka (Give and Take)
- 278140 Sérgio & Odair Assad: Jardim abandonado
- 287228 Gidon Kremer & Kremerata Baltica: De Profundis
- 292476 The Black Keys: Attack & Release
- 305852 Mark Morris Dance Group: The Hard Nut (DVD)
- 307452 Kronos Quartet: Plays Sigur Rós
- 310140 Shawn Colvin: Live
- 327036 The Magnetic Fields: Distortion
- 327100 John Adams: A Flowering Tree
- 356540 Stephen Sondheim: Sweeney Todd (2007 Film Soundtrack) (Highlights)
- 360508 Kronos Quartet: Terry Riley: The Cusp of Magic
- 368572 Stephen Sondheim: Sweeney Todd (2007 Film Soundtrack) (Deluxe Edition)
- 369020 Jonny Greenwood: There Will Be Blood
- 369796 Various Artists: " … and all the pieces matter": Five Years of Music from "The Wire"
- 376252 Brad Mehldau Trio: Live
- 376828 Pat Metheny: Day Trip
- 396732 Various Artists: Beyond Hamsterdam: Baltimore Tracks from "The Wire"
- 406780 Steve Reich: Daniel Variations
- 406908 k.d. lang: Watershed (Deluxe Edition)
- 424508 Philip Glass: Glass Box: A Nonesuch Retrospective
- 433724 Toumani Diabaté: The Mandé Variations
- 433788 Orchestra Baobab: Made in Dakar
- 435964 Bill Frisell: History, Mystery
- 439100 Nicholas Payton: Into the Blue
- 450300 T Bone Burnett: Tooth of Crime
- 451644 Wilco: Ashes of American Flags (DVD)
- 465532 Rokia Traoré: Tchamantché
- 467580 Pat Metheny: Tokyo Day Trip: Live EP
- 467708 Alarm Will Sound: a/rhythmia
- 468220 John Adams: Doctor Atomic Symphony
- 478524 Bill Frisell: Disfarmer
- 480380 Allen Toussaint: The Bright Mississippi
- 480444 Emmylou Harris: All I Intended to Be
- 480508 Richard Goode: Beethoven: The Complete Piano Concertos
- 510844 Joshua Redman: Compass
- 510893 Elliott Carter: A Nonesuch Retrospective
- 511487 Isabel Bayrakdarian: Gomidas Songs
- 511494 Pat Metheny: Question and Answer
- 511495 Jim Hall & Pat Metheny: Jim Hall & Pat Metheny
- 511496 Pat Metheny: Upojenie
- 511762 Ry Cooder: I, Flathead
- 512393 The Magnetic Fields: Please Stop Dancing EP (MP3s)
- 512396 John Adams: Hallelujah Junction: A Nonesuch Retrospective
- 512586 Chris Thile & Edgar Meyer: Edgar Meyer and Chris Thile
- 512789 Gidon Kremer & Kremerata Baltica: Mozart: The Complete Violin Concertos
- 513702 Caetano Veloso & David Byrne: Live at Carnegie Hall
- 514400 Chris Thile & Edgar Meyer: Edgar Meyer and Chris Thile (Deluxe CD + DVD)
- 514415 Buena Vista Social Club: Buena Vista Social Club at Carnegie Hall
- 515783 Gidon Kremer & Astor Piazzolla: Hommage à Piazzolla: The Complete Astor Piazzolla Recordings (8-CD Set)
- 516092 Bill Frisell: The Best of Bill Frisell, Vol. 1: Folk Songs
- 516276 The Black Keys: Live at the Crystal Ballroom (DVD)
- 516608 Wilco: Wilco (the album)
- 516668 Pat Metheny: Orchestrion
- 516987 Sara Watkins: Sara Watkins
- 516995 Carolina Chocolate Drops: Genuine Negro Jig
- 517129 Brad Mehldau Trio: The Art of the Trio Recordings: 1996–2001
- 517241 Dan Auerbach: Keep It Hid
- 517387 Thomas Newman: Revolutionary Road (Soundtrack)
- 517673 Amadou & Mariam: Welcome to Mali
- 517766 Audra McDonald: Go Back Home
- 517795 Pat Metheny: One Quiet Night
- 517948 Joshua Rifkin: The Baroque Beatles Book
- 518043 Bill Evans: Turn Out the Stars: The Final Village Vanguard Recordings, June 1980
- 518084 Wilco: A.M. (LP + CD)
- 518085 Wilco: Being There (2LP)
- 518086 Wilco: Summerteeth (2LP)
- 518349 Kronos Quartet: Floodplain
- 518654 Rokia Traoré: Zen (live)
- 518655 Brad Mehldau: Highway Rider
- 518940 Stephen Sondheim: Road Show
- 519237 Pat Metheny: Day Trip / Tokyo Day Trip (LP + CD)
- 519480 Emmylou Harris: Wrecking Ball (2014 CD/DVD reissue)
- 519594 The Magnetic Fields: Realism
- 519598 The Low Anthem: Oh My God, Charlie Darwin
- 519646 Björk: Voltaïc: Songs from the Volta Tour
- 519647 Björk: Voltaïc: Songs from the Volta Tour (Deluxe)
- 519650 Oumou Sangaré: Seya
- 519787 Gilbert Kalish: Joseph Haydn: Piano Music, Volume I
- 520266 The Black Keys: Brothers
- 520275 Brad Mehldau: Live in Marciac (2CD + DVD)
- 520659 Björk: Voltaïc: The Volta Mixes
- 521074 Tony Allen: Secret Agent
- 521980 Punch Brothers: Antifogmatic
- 522298 David Byrne & Fatboy Slim: Here Lies Love
- 522300 David Byrne & Fatboy Slim: Here Lies Love (Deluxe Edition)
- 522301 Natalie Merchant: Selections from the Album "Leave Your Sleep"
- 522304 Natalie Merchant: Leave Your Sleep
- 522413 Timo Andres: Shy and Mighty
- 522415 Caetano Veloso: zii e zie
- 522814 Youssou N'Dour: I Bring What I Love (Soundtrack)
- 522937 Ali Farka Touré & Toumani Diabaté: Ali and Toumani
- 523014 John Adams: Son of Chamber Symphony / String Quartet
- 523142 Billy Bragg & Wilco: Mermaid Avenue
- 523143 Billy Bragg & Wilco: Mermaid Avenue Vol. II
- 523268 k.d. lang: Recollection
- 523278 k.d. lang: Recollection (Deluxe Edition)
- 523488 Stephen Sondheim: A Little Night Music
- 523691 The Low Anthem: Smart Flesh
- 523775 The Low Anthem: Charlie Darwin (7" Single)
- 523942 Wilco: Kicking Television: Live in Chicago (LP Box Set)
- 523994 The Black Keys: Brothers (Deluxe Edition)
- 524056 Punch Brothers: Antifogmatic (Deluxe Edition)
- 524117 Vinicio Capossela: The Story-Faced Man
- 524138 Rhys Chatham: A Crimson Grail
- 524282 Laurie Anderson: Only an Expert (12" Vinyl Single)
- 524520 Randy Newman: Live in London (CD + DVD)
- 524842 John Adams: I Am Love (Soundtrack)
- 524853 Steve Reich: Double Sextet / 2×5
- 524876 Ben Folds & Nick Hornby: Lonely Avenue
- 524877 Ben Folds & Nick Hornby: Lonely Avenue (Deluxe Edition)
- 525261 Philip Selway: Familial
- 525263 Wanda Jackson: The Party Ain't Over
- 525874 k.d. lang & The Siss Boom Bang: Sing it Loud
- 525943 Randy Newman: Songbook Vol. 2
- 525966 Emmylou Harris: Hard Bargain
- 525993 AfroCubism: AfroCubism
- 526130 Carolina Chocolate Drops & Luminescent Orchestrii: Carolina Chocolate Drops / Luminescent Orchestrii
- 526176 Björk: The Comet Song (iTunes Exclusive)
- 526294 James Farm: James Farm
- 526609 Jessica Lea Mayfield: Tell Me
- 526752 Carter Burwell: True Grit (Soundtrack)
- 526880 Jonny Greenwood: Norwegian Wood (Soundtrack)
- 527011 Amadou & Mariam: Remixes
- 527063 Donnacha Dennehy:Grá agus Bás
- 527267 Kate & Anna McGarrigle: Tell My Sister
- 527269 Cheikh Lô: Jamm
- 527407 Ry Cooder: Pull Up Some Dust and Sit Down
- 527603 Chris Thile & Michael Daves: Sleep with One Eye Open
- 527912 Pat Metheny: What's It All About
- 527957 Steve Reich: 2×5 Remixed
- 528236 Steve Reich: WTC 9/11 / Mallet Quartet / Dance Patterns
- 528371 Brad Mehldau & Kevin Hays & Patrick Zimmerli: Modern Music
- 528673 Björk: The Crystalline Series: Serban Ghenea Mixes
- 528728 Björk: Biophilia
- 528733 Philip Selway: Running Blind (EP)
- 528982 Gidon Kremer & Kremerata Baltica: The Art of Instrumentation: Homage to Glenn Gould
- 529007 Fatoumata Diawara: Kanou
- 529099 The Black Keys: El Camino
- 529103 The Black Keys: Lonely Boy
- 529689 Brad Mehldau Trio: Ode
- 529776 Kronos Quartet: Music of Vladimir Martynov
- 529777 Punch Brothers: Who's Feeling Young Now?
- 529809 Carolina Chocolate Drops: Leaving Eden
- 529832 The Low Anthem: Smart Flesh (Extras) (EP)
- 529926 Billy Bragg & Wilco: Mermaid Avenue: The Complete Sessions
- 530223 Krzysztof Penderecki & Jonny Greenwood: Threnody for the Victims of Hiroshima / Popcorn Superhet Receiver / Polymorphia / 48 Responses to Polymorphia
- 530280 Amadou & Mariam: Dougou Badia (EP)
- 530395 Dr. John: Locked Down
- 530403 Amadou & Mariam: Folila
- 530526 Sara Watkins: You're the One I Love (7" Single)
- 530562 Jeremy Denk: Ligeti/Beethoven
- 530682 Shawn Colvin: All Fall Down
- 530684 Sara Watkins: Sun Midnight Sun
- 530858 Sam Amidon: Bright Sunny South
- 531159 Ry Cooder: Election Special
- 531209 Fatoumata Diawara: Fatou
- 531257 Pat Metheny: Unity Band
- 531450 The Black Keys: Tour Rehearsal Tapes
- 531819 Lianne La Havas: Is Your Love Big Enough?
- 531821 Pat Metheny: The Orchestrion Project
- 532029 Brad Mehldau Trio: Where Do You Start
- 532288 Joshua Redman: Walking Shadows
- 532291 John Adams: Nixon in China (Metropolitan Opera; Blu-ray / DVD)
- 532292 Jonny Greenwood: The Master (Soundtrack)
- 532559 Jonny Greenwood: The Master (Soundtrack) (LP + CD)
- 533294 Punch Brothers: Ahoy! (EP)
- 533400 Nataly Dawn: How I Knew Her
- 534285 Emmylou Harris & Rodney Crowell: Old Yellow Moon
- 534291 Bombino: Nomad
- 534416 Timo Andres: Home Stretch
- 534452 Devendra Banhart: Mala
- 534456 Iron and Wine: Ghost on Ghost
- 534585 Ry Cooder & Corridos Famosos: Live in San Francisco
- 534863 Rokia Traoré: Beautiful Africa
- 534867 Various Artists: Inside Llewyn Davis (Soundtrack)
- 534872 Various Artists: Sing Me the Songs: Celebrating the Works of Kate McGarrigle
- 535064 Bombino: Azamane Tiliade / Si Chilan (10" Single)
- 535356 Jeremy Denk: J.S. Bach: Goldberg Variations CD+DVD
- 535352 John Zorn / Pat Metheny: Tap: Book of Angels Volume 20
- 535360 Chris Thile: Bach: Sonatas and Partitas, Vol. 1
- 536077 Billy Bragg & Wilco: Mermaid Avenue Vol. III
- 536354 Pat Metheny Unity Group: Kin (←→)
- 536374 Various Artists: Inside Llewyn Davis (Soundtrack) (LP)
- 536376 Sam Amidon: Bright Sunny South (LP + Bonus 7")
- 536377 Chris Thile: Bach: Sonata No. 1 in G Minor / Partita No. 1 in B Minor (LP)
- 536645 Brad Mehldau & Mark Guiliana: Mehliana: Taming the Dragon
- 536951 Kronos Quartet: Kronos Explorer Series
- 536952 Kronos Quartet: A Thousand Thoughts
- 537579 David Byrne & Fatboy Slim: Here Lies Love: Original Cast Recording
- 540989 Jacob Cooper: Silver Threads
- 541042 Natalie Merchant: Natalie Merchant
- 541356 John Adams: City Noir / Saxophone Concerto performed by St. Louis Symphony, led by David Robertson, featuring saxophonist Timothy McAllister
- 541364 Caetano Veloso: Abraçaço
- 541708 Rhiannon Giddens: Tomorrow Is My Turn
- 541711 Olivia Chaney: The Longest River
- 541777 Various Artists: Another Day, Another Time: Celebrating the Music of "Inside Llewyn Davis"
- 541941 Nico Muhly: Two Boys
- 541944 Nickel Creek: A Dotted Line
- 541970 Emmylou Harris: Wrecking Ball [LP]
- 541997 Louis Andriessen: La Commedia
- 542164 Clint Mansell: Noah: Music from the Motion Picture (feat. Kronos Quartet)
- 542300 The Black Keys: Turn Blue
- 542939 Toumani Diabaté & Sidiki Diabaté: Toumani & Sidiki
- 543123 Steve Reich: Radio Rewrite performed by Alarm Will Sound, Jonny Greenwood, Vicky Chow
- 543642 Sam Amidon: Lily-O
- 543671 Wilco: What's Your 20? Essential Tracks 1994–2014
- 543674 Wilco: Alpha Mike Foxtrot: Rare Tracks 1994–2014 [LP]
- 543675 Wilco: Alpha Mike Foxtrot: Rare Tracks 1994–2014
- 543970 Various Artists: Boyhood: Music from the Motion Picture
- 543973 Robert Plant: Lullaby and... The Ceaseless Roar
- 544735 Chris Thile & Edgar Meyer: Bass & Mandolin
- 545186 James Farm: City Folk
- 545979 Various Artists: Another Day, Another Time: Celebrating the Music of "Inside Llewyn Davis" [LP]
- 546377 Punch Brothers: The Phosphorescent Blues
- 546521 Tigran Hamasyan: Mockroot
- 546360 Abelardo Barroso with Orquesta Sensación: Cha Cha Cha
- 546900 Jonny Greenwood + Various Artists: Inherent Vice: Original Motion Picture Soundtrack
- 547343 Punch Brothers: The Phosphorescent Blues [LP]
- 547466 Tyondai Braxton: HIVE1
- 548238 The Staves: If I Was
- 548243 Emmylou Harris & Rodney Crowell: The Traveling Kind
- 548606 Buena Vista Social Club: Lost and Found
- 548920 The Bad Plus Joshua Redman: The Bad Plus Joshua Redman
- 548925 Kronos Quartet: One Earth, One People, One Love: Kronos Plays Terry Riley
- 549103 Brad Mehldau: 10 Years Solo Live [8-LP set]
- 549311 Mbongwana Star: From Kinshasa
- 549523 Kronos Quartet: Sunrise of the Planetary Dream Collector: Music of Terry Riley
- 549570 Henryk Górecki: Symphony No. 4
- 549801 Natalie Merchant: Paradise Is There: The New Tigerlily Recordings
- 549857 The Arcs: Yours, Dreamily,
- 550000 Lianne La Havas: Blood
- 550182 St Germain: St Germain
- 550588 Henryk Górecki: A Nonesuch Retrospective [7-CD set]
- 551822 Rhiannon Giddens: Factory Girl [EP]
- 551913 Lake Street Dive: Side Pony
- 552027 Laurie Anderson: Heart of a Dog soundtrack
- 552317 The Arcs: The Arcs vs. The Inventors, Vol. I [EP]
- 552641 Shye Ben Tzur, Jonny Greenwood, and The Rajasthan Express: Junun
- 552785 Punch Brothers: The Wireless [EP]
- 553323 Mariza: Mundo
- 553734 Michael Daves: Orchids and Violence
- 553787 Clint Mansell featuring Kronos Quartet: Requiem for a Dream Soundtrack [LP]
- 554246 Michael Daves: Violence and Orchids [LP]
- 554569 Pat Metheny: The Unity Sessions
- 554650 Cuong Vu Trio & Pat Metheny: Cuong Vu Trio Meets Pat Metheny
- 554644 Allen Toussaint: American Tunes
- 554678 Brad Mehldau Trio: Blues and Ballads
- 554796 Joshua Redman & Brooklyn Rider: Sun on Sand composed and arranged by Patrick Zimmerli
- 555078 Caetano Veloso & Gilberto Gil: Dois Amigos, Um Século de Música: Multishow Live
- 555845 Joshua Redman & Brad Mehldau: Nearness
- 556120 Berg: Lulu (Metropolitan Opera production; Blu-ray / DVD)
- 556250 Devendra Banhart: Ape in Pink Marble
- 556491 Conor Oberst: Ruminations
- 556783 Nico Muhly & Teitur: Confessions
- 557170 John Adams: Scheherazade.2 performed by St. Louis Symphony, led by David Robertson, featuring violinist Leila Josefowicz
- 558154 The Magnetic Fields: 50 Song Memoir
- 558563 Randy Newman: Dark Matter
- 558592 Conor Oberst: Salutations
- 558638 Offa Rex (The Decemberists & Olivia Chaney): The Queen of Hearts
- 558771 Chris Thile & Brad Mehldau: Chris Thile & Brad Mehldau
- 558777 Fleet Foxes: Crack-Up
- 558805 Rhiannon Giddens: Freedom Highway
- 558933 Yo-Yo Ma, Chris Thile, Edgar Meyer: Bach Trios
- 559114 Tigran Hamasyan: An Ancient Observer
- 559151 Kronos Quartet with Sam Amidon, Olivia Chaney, Rhiannon Giddens, Natalie Merchant: Folk Songs
- 559638 Sam Amidon: The Following Mountain
- 561604 Natalie Merchant: The Natalie Merchant Collection
- 561784 Louis Andriessen: Theatre of the World with Los Angeles Philharmonic
- 562756 John Adams: Violin Concerto with Leila Josefowicz, St. Louis Symphony
- 562886 Rostam: Half-Light
- 563057 Robert Plant: Catch Fire
- 563508 Brad Mehldau Trio Seymour Reads the Constitution!
- 563777 Fleet Foxes: The Electric Lady Session (Record Store Day: Black Friday 10")
- 564004 Camille: OUÏ (US only)
- 564053 The Staves & yMusic: The Way Is Read
- 564164 Laurie Anderson & Kronos Quartet: Landfall
- 564711 Chris Thile: Thanks for Listening
- 564777 Jonny Greenwood: Phantom Thread (Soundtrack)
- 565047 Joshua Redman, Ron Miles, Scott Colley, Brian Blade: Still Dreaming
- 565456 Tigran Hamasyan: For Gyumri EP
- 565676 Steve Reich: Pulse/Quartet w/International Contemporary Ensemble & Colin Currie Group
- 565710 David Byrne: American Utopia
- 565982 Brad Mehldau: After Bach
- 563316 Jeremy Denk: c. 1300–c. 2000
- 566773 John Adams: Doctor Atomic
- 567158 Lake Street Dive: Free Yourself Up
- 567191 Olivia Chaney: Shelter
- 567405 Thomas Bartlett & Nico Muhly: Peter Pears: Balinese Ceremonial Music
- 567597 The Staves: Pine Hollow EP
- 570726 Mandy Patinkin: Diary: January 27, 2018
- 571525 Gabriel Kahane: Book of Travelers
- 571699 Fleet Foxes: First Collection 2006–2009
- 571939 Mountain Man: Magic Ship
- 574181 True Stories, A Film By David Byrne: The Complete Soundtrack
- 574344 Mandy Patinkin: Diary: April/May 2018
- 587444 Caroline Shaw / Attacca Quartet: Orange (released with New Amsterdam Records)
- 574824 David Byrne: American Utopia (Deluxe Edition)
- 585191 Emmylou Harris: The Studio Albums 1980-83
- 585291 Joshua Redman Quartet: Come What May
- 585867 Brad Mehldau: Finding Gabriel
- 587754 Daniel Wohl: Melt
- 587972 Kronos Quartet: Terry Riley: Sun Rings
- 590870 Daughter of Swords: Dawnbreaker
- 590958 Gaby Moreno & Van Dyke Parks: ¡Spangled!
- 591092 William Brittelle: Spiritual America (released with New Amsterdam Records)
- 591336 Rhiannon Giddens with Francesco Turrisi: there is no Other
- 591592 The Black Keys: "Let's Rock"
- 591517 Alarm Will Sound: Donnacha Dennehy: The Hunger
- 595950 Mandy Patinkin: Diary: December 2018
- 596317 Pat Metheny: From This Place
- 599090 Mandy Patinkin: Children and Art
- 599099 Rachael & Vilray: Rachael & Vilray
- 599193 Devendra Banhart: Ma
- 599197 Vagabon: Vagabon
- 599661 Carminho: Maria
- 604496 Sam Amidon: Fatal Flower Garden EP (A Tribute to Harry Smith)
- 604600 David Byrne: American Utopia on Broadway Original Cast Recording
- 607283 Jeff Parker: Max Brown single
- 624971 Jeff Parker: Suite for Max Brown
- 624982 Dave Malloy: Octet Original Cast Recording
