= Nasser Rastegar-Nejad =

Nasser Rastegar-Nejad (Persian: ناصر رستگارنژاد; April 20, 1929 – December 13, 2018) was an Iranian Santur player. He released an album on the Nonesuch Records Explorer label. In 1968, a section of the track 'Dashti' (1:58 - 3:24), played by Nasser Rastegar-Nejad, and originally to be found on the album Mid East, volume 8, 1968, published by American Friends of the Middle East, was used in the film Performance to accompany the scene in which characters played by Mick Jagger and Anita Pallenberg make love. The track has since been re-released, along with others, on the Lyrichord album In a Persian Garden: The Santur in 2007.

== Discography ==
- Music of Iran - Santur Recital, Vol 1, Lyrichord LLST 7135
  - Mahur
  - Bayat-e Esfehan & Saghinameh
  - Homayun
  - Shustari

 Music of Iran - Santur Recital, Vol 2, Lyrichord LLST 7165

  - Afsari (vocal)
  - Dashti
  - Segah
  - Chagargah
- Music of Iran - Santur Recital, Vol 3, Lyrichord LLST 7166
  - Dashti
  - Shur
  - Abu Ata
  - Afshari instrumental)
- The Persian Santur: Music Of Iran, Nonesuch Explorer Records

== See also ==
- Nonesuch Records discography
