= Mouneïssa =

Studio album by Rokia Traoré
- Released: 1998
- Recorded: 1997
- Genre: World
- Length: 45:52
- Label: Indigo
- Producer: Label Bleu

Rokia Traoré chronology
Mouneïssa (1998)	Wanita (album) (2000)

Professional ratings
Review scores
Source	Rating
Allmusic	3/5 stars

Mouneïssa is the 1998, first international CD release from Malian singer/songwriter Rokia Traoré. Its release followed a time of meeting with and guidance from Ali Farka Touré, as well as the support of La Maison de la Culture d’Amiens pour Label Bleu, fr:Label Bleu which produced the record for the Indigo label. The record is very traditional in its musicality and lyricism and touches upon many folk elements of the Malian people.

Coming from a long history of Malian musicians, Rokia is able to combine poetic metaphor with the different musical elements of her country. For the first time, the balaba (the large balafon of her region, has been paired with the ngoni (instrument) (the instrument favored by Bambara griots).

== Release and availability ==
Originally released in 1998 on HDCD, this recording is currently out of print and more expensive to acquire than the average used cd.

== Track listing ==
1. "Laidu" – 6:22
2. " Mouneïssa " – 5:39
3. "Finini" – 5:06
4. "Dianguina" – 5:17
5. "Sabali" – 5:04
6. "Tchiwara" – 3:41
7. "Fatalité" – 4:40
8. "Sakanto" – 4:28
9. "Sé" – 5:35

== Personnel ==
- Rokia Traoré - Chants
- Andra Kouyaté – N’goni
- Baba Sissoko – N’goni, petites percussions
- Oumar Diallo (musician) – Guitarre basse
- Abdoul Wahab Berthé – Guitare basse
- Samba Diarra – Balafon
- Dimba Camara – Percussions (guita)
- Souleymane Ann – Percussions

== Production ==
- Executive producer: Michel Orier
- Collection director: Christian Mousset
- Production assistant: Martine Patrice
- Recording/Mixing studio: Studio Gil Evans d’Amiens
- Recording/Mixing engineer: Philippe Teissier Du Cros
- Recording/Mixing assistant: Pierre Guinot
- Digital Editing: Jean-Pierre Bouquet (L’Autre Studio)
- Front cover and layout: Christophe Rémy
- Color photos: Antonin Potoski
- Black & white photos: Dominique Lagnous
- Liner notes: Fara C
- Translations (French): Mariam Lainé
- Translations (English): Stéphanie Carwin
- English song summaries: Philippa Wehle
- Special thanks: Ali Farka Touré, la Mission de Coopération et d’Action Culturelle de la France au Mali, l’Office de Radio Télévision du Mali, l’Institut National des Arts du Mali, toute l’equipe Label Blue/Indigo et le Centre Cultural Français de Bamako. Avec l’aimable contribution de Massambou Wellé Diallo.

== Sales ==
Region	Certification	Certified units/sales
Europe	—	40,000
