= Per Arne Glorvigen =

Norwegian musician and composer (born 1963)

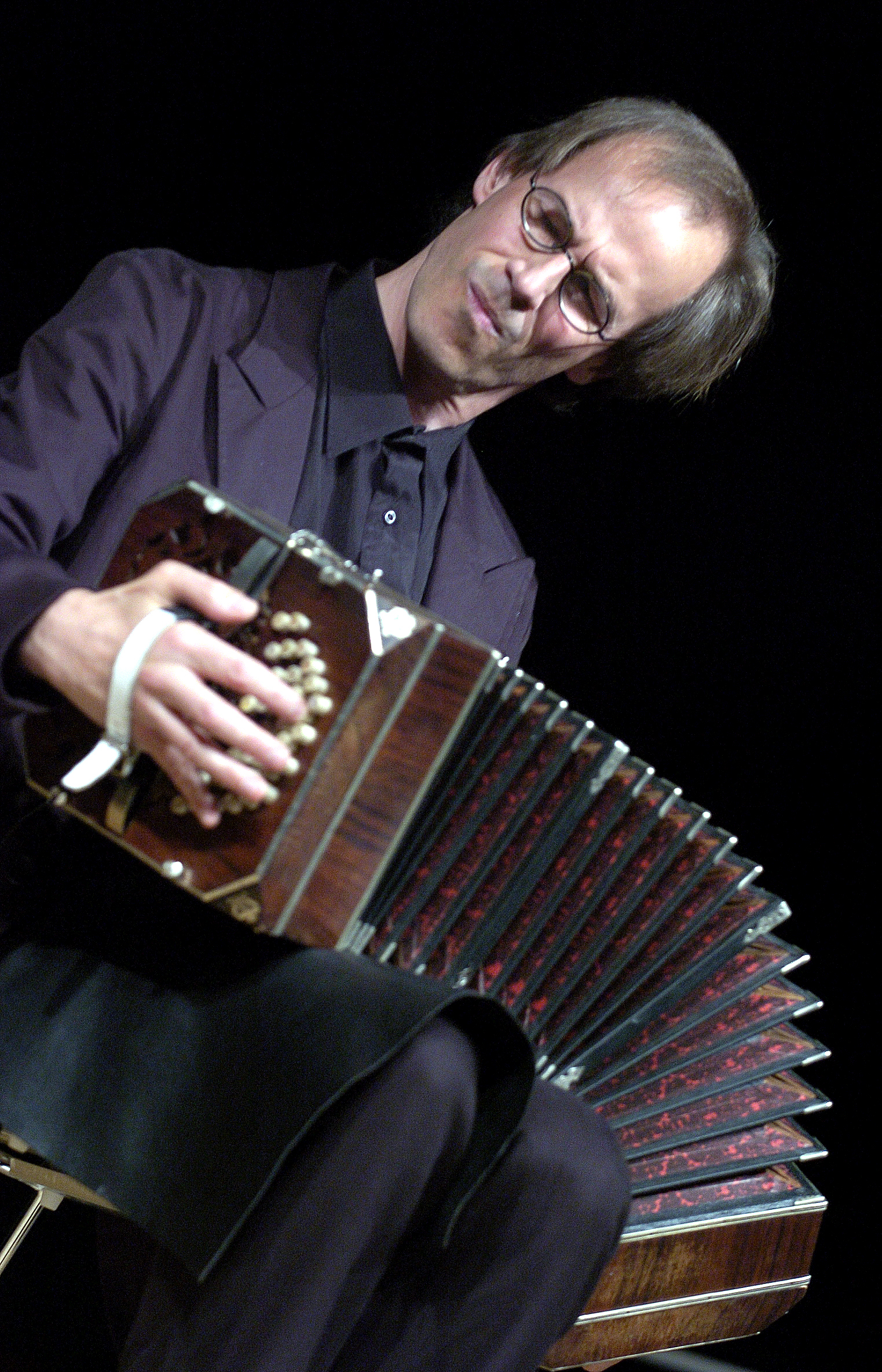

Background information
- Born: June 2, 1963 (age 61); Drammen, Norway
- Genres: contemporary, tango, klezmer, baroque
- Instruments: Bandoneon
- Years active: 1988-present
- Website: www.perarneglorvigen.com

Per Arne Glorvigen (born 2 June 1963, in Drammen) is a Norwegian musician and composer, particularly known as a bandoneon and tango player. He is mentioned as one of the world's leading contemporary bandoneon players and "wizard of the buttons" (The Times).

He studied with Juan José Mosalini in France. In France he appeared with France Gall and Amelita Baltar. From 1994 he worked with Gidon Kremer and they formed the Astor-Quartet with Vadim Sakharov (piano) and Alois Pusch (double bass). With Kremer he recorded 4 CDs the first named "Hommage à Piazzolla." Glorvigen has performed with BBC Symphony Orchestra, Staatskapelle Dresden and the Alban Berg Quartett. He has adapted organ music by J. S. Bach to the bandoneon.

Glorvigen was named Artist in Residence at the Bergen International Festival 2006. Henrik Hellstenius' concerto for Glorvigen's bandoneon Glorvigen first performed with Oslo Oslo Philharmonic Orchestra in 2008. Willem Jeths also dedicated a bandoneon concerto to Glorvigen.

== Discography ==
- 1997: Hommage à Piazzolla, with Kremer, Choc in Le Monde de la musique, nominated for "Grammy" (WPCS 5070 Nonesuch/Warner USA)
- 1997: El Tango, with Kremer, award Victoires de la musique (WPCS 5080 Nonesuch/Warner USA 1997)
- 1998: Maria de Buenos Aires, with Kremer, nominated for “Grammy” USA (3984-22063-3 Teldec/Warner Germany 1998)
- 1999: Tango Ballet, with Gidon Kremer (3984-226612 Teldec/Warner Germany 1999)
- 2001: From Yesterday to Penny Lane, Göran Söllscher plays the Beatles (Deutsche Grammophon 459692-2)
- 2002: Buenos Aires with Carrefour Slagverkensemble (NorthwestClassics Nwc 205275)
- 2003: Tango Sensations with Alban Berg Quartett (Emi Classics 724355777829)
- 2004: Argentinske Tangoar og Lyriske Stykkjer av Grieg, (Solo Bandoneon) (BAN 101-2 2004)
- 2005: Sarabando, with Tormod Dalen (NorthwestClassics Nwc 306168)
- 2005: Jazz up the Beatles, various artists (Verve)
- 2005: Great recordings of the century, with Alban Berg Quartett (EMI classics)
- 2007: Virgin and Whore, with Sveinung Lillebjerka (Simax)

== Works ==
- 2007: Duda y Fuerza for string quartet and bandoneon, for KKKK-Festival, Kristiansund.
- 2007: Zalgo, for guitar and bandoneon, first performance at KKKK-festival, Kristiansund.
- 2012: Violent Tenderness for string quartet and bandoneon, for Apollon Musagète Quartet.
- 2015: Tango Funebre (after Chopin) for Apollon Musagète string quartet/Chopin festival, Warsaw.
- 2015: Stabat Mater for sopran, percussion, bandoneon, choir and strings. KKKK-festival, Kristiansund.
