= Hommage à Piazzolla =

Hommage à Piazzolla is a set of recordings by the violinist Gidon Kremer dedicated to the music of Astor Piazzolla. Most of the recordings are of a small group with violin, bandoneon (Per Arne Glorvigen), guitar, bass and piano. These recordings were released on the Nonesuch Records label, initially as a single CD in 1997 (79407 Gidon Kremer: Hommage à Piazzolla) then in 2012 as part of an 8-cd collection of all Gidon Kremer's previous Piazzolla recordings for the label (515783 Gidon Kremer & Astor Piazzolla: Hommage à Piazzolla: The Complete Astor Piazzolla Recordings (8-CD Set)).
