= Rokia Traoré =

Malian musician (born 1974)

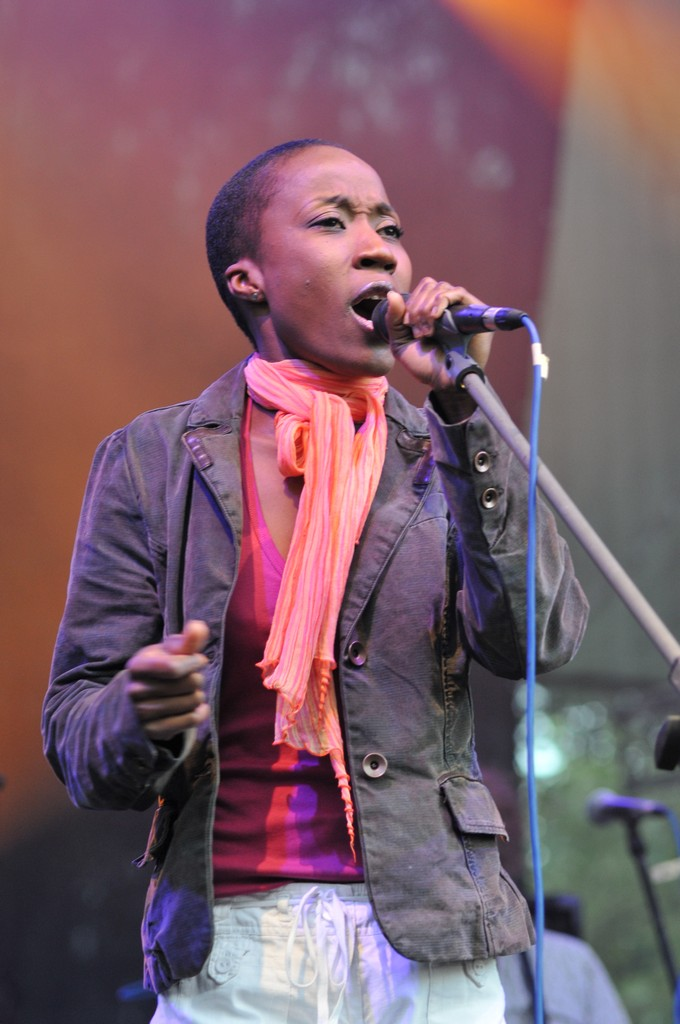
- Traoré at INmusic festival in 2009.

Background information
- Born: 24 January 1974 (age 52); Mali
- Origin: Kolokani, Mali
- Genres: World music, Electroacoustic, Afro-beat, Folk
- Occupations: Singer, songwriter, guitarist
- Years active: 1997–present
- Website: www.rokiatraore.net

Rokia Traoré (born 24 January 1974) is a Malian singer, songwriter and guitarist.

She made six albums between 1998 and 2016. Bowmboï (2003) won the Critics Award category at the BBC Radio 3 Awards for World Music in 2004 and Tchamantché (2008) won Victoires de la Musique World Music Album of the Year in 2009. Traoré won Best Artist in the Songlines Music Awards in 2009.

She is a member of the Bambara ethnic group.

== Biography ==
Traoré's father was a diplomat and she travelled widely in her youth. She visited Algeria, Saudi Arabia, France and Belgium and was exposed to a wide variety of influences. Her hometown of Kolokani is in the northwestern part of Mali's Koulikoro region. In 1997, Traoré linked with Mali musician Ali Farka Touré which raised her profile.

She was selected to be on the jury for the main competition section of the 2015 Cannes Film Festival.

Despite their shared last name, she is not related to Malian singer/guitarist Boubacar Traoré, although they performed a duet together on her 2000 album Wanita.

== Recordings ==
Her first album Mouneïssa (Label Bleu), released in late 1997 in Mali and on 1 September 1998 in Europe, was acclaimed for its fresh treatment and unqualifiable combinations of several Malian music traditions such as her use of the ngoni and the balafon. It sold over 40,000 copies in Europe.

On 11 July 2000, her second album Wanita was released. Traoré wrote and arranged the entire album.

Her 2003 album Bowmboï has two tracks recorded with the Kronos Quartet but still sung in the Bamana language.

Her album Tchamantché was released on 6 May 2008, followed in 2013 by her album Beautiful Africa.

She wrote the music for the 2011 Toni Morrison play Desdemona.

== Personal life ==
From 2013 to 2018, Traoré had a relationship with Jan Goossens, a Belgian playwright and artistic director with whom she has a daughter, born in Belgium in 2015. Since their separation in 2018, the couple have been in conflict over custody of their daughter. The custody conflicts are due in part to conflict between African and European judicial systems. A court in Mali issued full custody to Traoré, but this was disputed by the government in Goossens' home country of Belgium.

In March 2020, Traoré was arrested after a judge in Brussels issued a warrant ordering her to surrender her five-year-old daughter. Traoré was detained at Fleury-Mérogis Prison near Paris and went on hunger strike upon her arrival. She had been traveling to Europe to attend a hearing related to the custody dispute at the time of the arrest. Several musicians publicly voiced support for Traoré and called for her release, including Angélique Kidjo, Damon Albarn, Youssou N'Dour, and Salif Keita.

On 22 June 2024, Traoré was arrested upon her arrival in Italy, following a European arrest warrant, issued by Belgian justice. On September 26, the Italian justice system decided to extradite Traoré.

On 20 November, the Italian Court of Cassation gave its authorization for the extradition of Rokia Traoré to Belgium, rendering its final judgment of extraction to Belgium. On 29 November, Traoré was extradited from Italy to Belgium and imprisoned in Haren prison in Brussels.

On 22 January 2025, Traoré agreed to reach an agreement with the girl's father so that both could see the child again. A hearing was scheduled for June 2025 in Brussels to examine the implementation of the agreement and scheduled the pleadings.

== Musical styles and influences ==
Traoré's arrangements are minimal in nature and her vocal style is smooth and gentle. She uses traditional instruments such as the balafon, n'goni, and kora, as well as acoustic guitar and electric bass. She traveled to several continents as a child due to her father's work as a diplomat, and was exposed to musical styles including Western classical music, jazz, pop, and Indian traditional composition.

While the Bambara have a tradition of griot performing at weddings, members of the nobility, such as Traoré, are discouraged from performing as musicians. Traoré attended lycée in Mali while her father was stationed in Brussels and started performing publicly as a university student in Bamako. She plays acoustic guitar as well as sings, and uses vocal harmonies in her arrangements which are rare in Malian music. She also plays ngoni (lute) and balafon.

== Performances ==
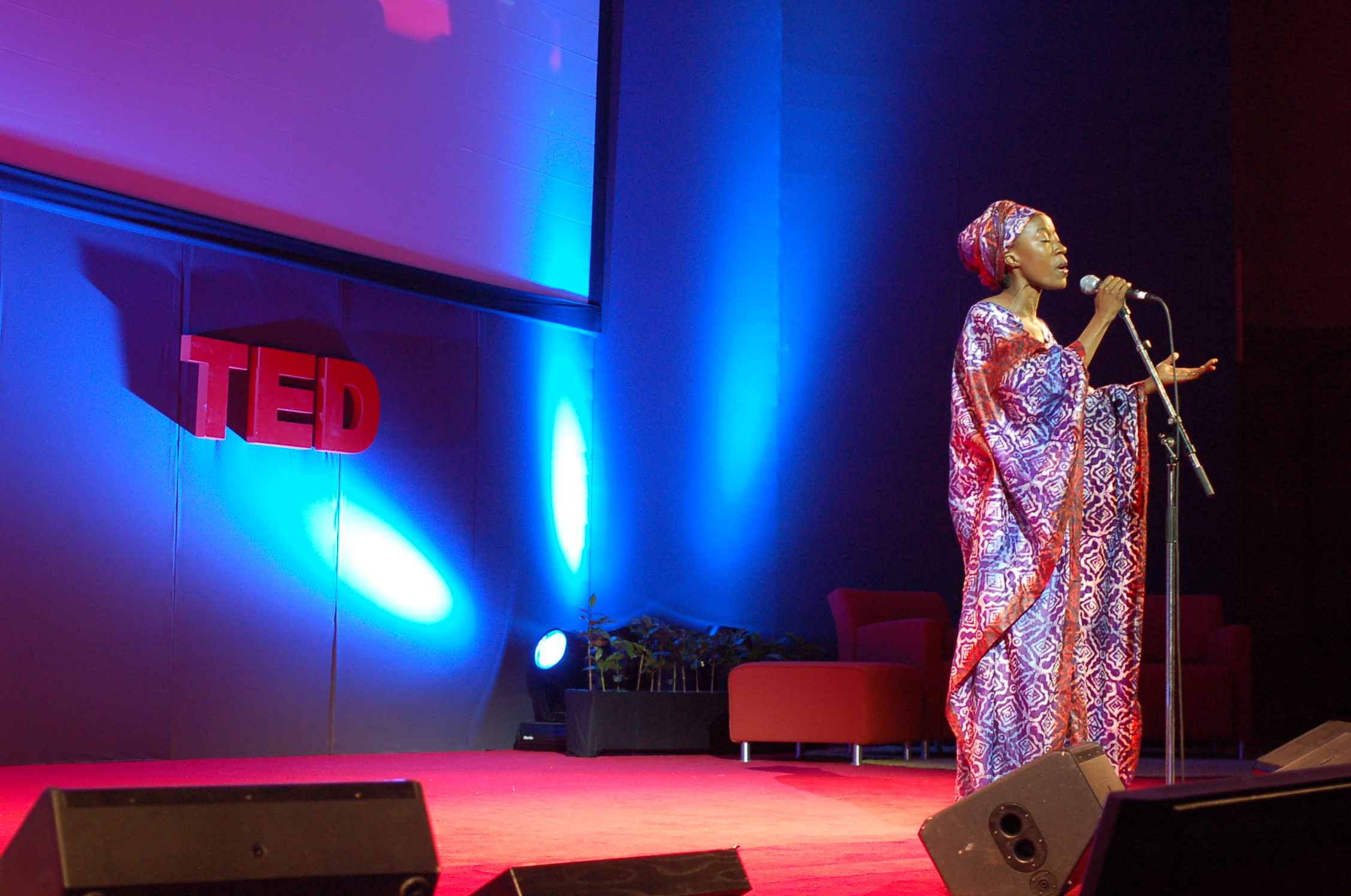
Traoré singing at TED in 2007.

She played at WOMAD in 2004 and completed her first tour of North America in the same year.

In March 2005 she performed at the "Africa Live" festival, held in Dakar, Senegal. Also in 2005, she performed at the Youssou N'dour and Friends concert in Geneva.

In December 2006, Peter Sellars' New Crowned Hope festival, which is part of the City of Vienna's celebrations commemorating Wolfgang Amadeus Mozart's birthday 250 years ago, saw the world premiere of Wati, a performance by Rokia Traoré and the Klangforum Wien.

In 2011, she performed at Paolo Fresu's "Time in Jazz" festival in Berchidda.

In September 2012, she was included in the campaign "30 Songs / 30 Days" to support Half the Sky: Turning Oppression into Opportunity for Women Worldwide, a multi-platform media project inspired by Nicholas Kristof and Sheryl WuDunn’s book.

In 2013, she performed at Glastonbury Festival.

== Awards ==
- 1997: Radio France Internationale prize, "African Discovery" of 1997.
- 2000: One of The New York Times' critics nominated Wanita for album of the year.
- 2004: Winner, BBC Radio 3 Awards for World Music, Critics Award category for Bowmboï
- 2004: Runner-up, BBC Radio 3 Awards for World Music, Africa category
- 2005: Runner-up, BBC Radio 3 Awards for World Music, Africa category
- 2009: Victoires de la Musique World Music Album of the Year for Tchamantché
- 2009: Winner, Best Artist category, Songlines Music Awards

== Discography ==
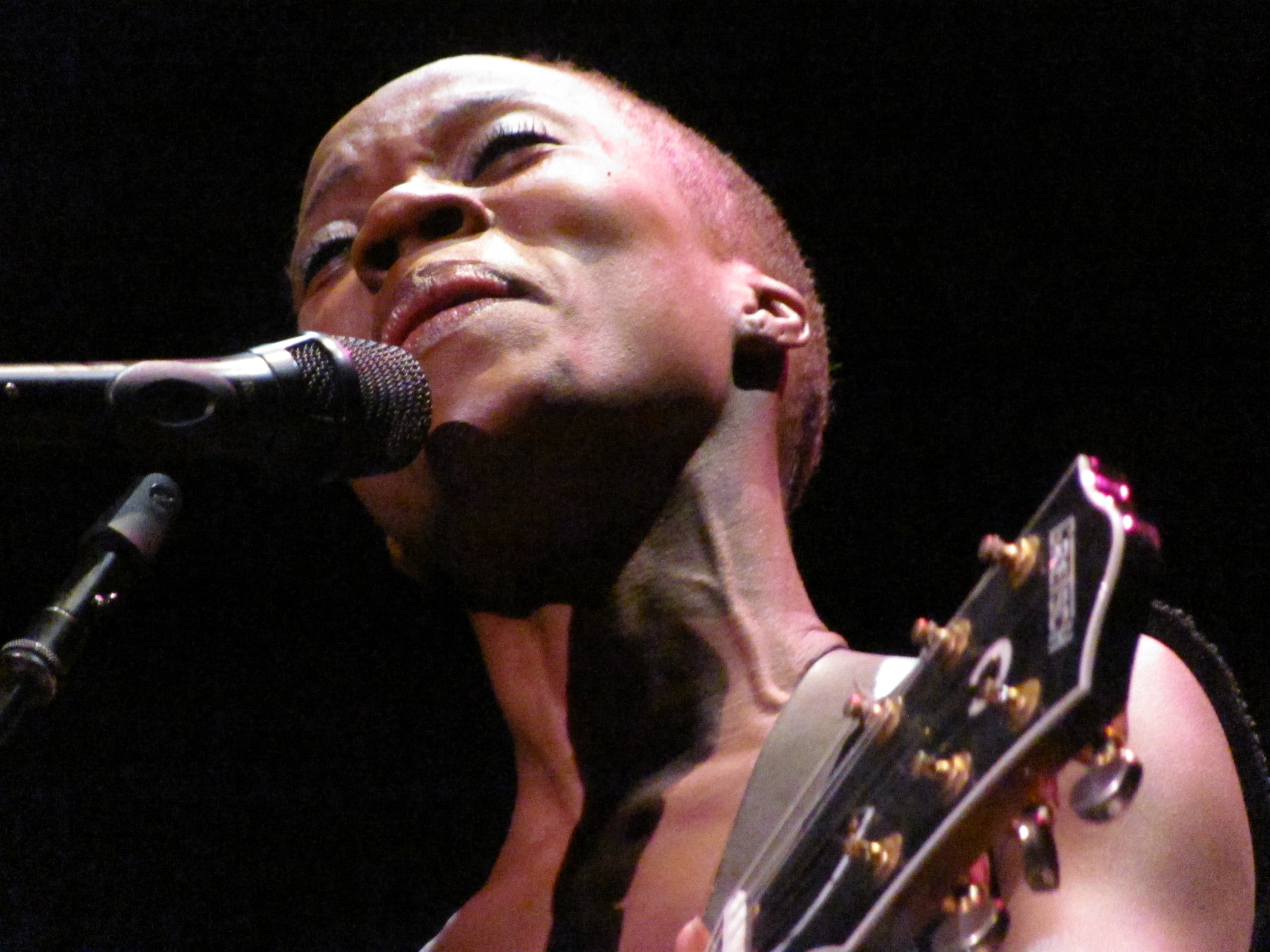
Traoré on her Beautiful Africa tour in San Francisco, 2013

Year	Album	Peak positions		
Year	Album	BEL (Fl)	BEL (Wa)	FR
1998	Mouneïssa	–	–	–
2000	Wanita	–	–	–
2003	Bowmboï	–	–	43
2008	Tchamantché	76	63	35
2013	Beautiful Africa	86	120	66
2016	Né So	49	139	77
