= Beautiful Africa =

Studio album by Rokia Traoré
- Released: April 8, 2013
- Genre: International
- Length: 44:58
- Label: Nonesuch
- Producer: John Parish

Rokia Traoré chronology
| Tchamantché (2008) | Beautiful Africa (2013) |

Professional ratings
Aggregate scores
| Source | Rating |
|---|---|
| Metacritic | 87/100 |
Review scores
| Source | Rating |
| AllMusic | 4/5 stars |
| Evening Standard | 4/5 stars |
| The Guardian | 5/5 stars |
| Mojo | 4/5 stars |
| MSN Music (Expert Witness) | B+ |
| musicOMH | 4.5/5 stars |
| The Observer | 5/5 stars |
| Pitchfork | 8.1/10 |
| Tom Hull | B+ |
| Uncut | 8/10 |

Beautiful Africa is the fifth studio album by Maliian musician Rokia Traoré. It was released in April 2013 under Nonesuch Records.

== Track list ==
| No. | Title | Length |
|---|---|---|
| 1. | "Lalla" | 3:29 |
| 2. | "Kouma" | 4:00 |
| 3. | "Sikey" | 3:28 |
| 4. | "Ka Moun Kè" | 6:26 |
| 5. | "Mélancolie" | 4:08 |
| 6. | "N'téri" | 9:27 |
| 7. | "Tuit Tuit" | 5:23 |
| 8. | "Beautiful Africa" | 3:34 |
| 9. | "Sarama" | 5:03 |

== Charts ==
| Chart (2013) | Position |
|---|---|
| BEL (Vl) | 86 |
| BEL (Wa) | 120 |
| FR | 66 |
