= Vanity (disambiguation) =

Vanity is excessive self-regard and overblown pride.

Vanity may also refer to:

- Vanity (dressing-table), a dressing table with a large mirror
- Vanity (clothing), an American clothing retailer
- HMS Vanity, the name of more than one ship of the British Royal Navy
- Vanity gallery, an art gallery for artists to present their works
- Vanity label, a recording produced by musicians themselves
- Vanity number, a kind of telephone number
- Vanity press, a publishing company that prints self-published works, provided the author pays the cost themselves
- "Vanity of vanities, all is vanity", the opening verse of Ecclesiastes
- Vanitas (Latin for vanity), a type of still life

== Arts ==
- Vanity (painting), a 1907 painting by Frank Cadogan Cowper
- Vanity 6, musical group
- Vanity (comics), fictional city in the DC Comics universe
- Vanity (Eighteen Visions album), 2002
- Vanity, album by Isabella Lovestory, 2025
- Vanity (Starflyer 59 album), 2021
- "Vanity" (1951 song), song by Jack Manus, Guy Wood and Bernard Bierman
- "Vanity", song by Lady Gaga, 2008
- "Vanity", a 2010 song by Christina Aguilera from Bionic
- "Vanity", a 2015 song by Arca from Mutant
- "Vanity" (Ai Otsuka song), 2023
- Vanity (1927 film), American silent drama film
- Vanity (1935 film), British comedy film
- Vanity (1947 film), Italian film
- Vanity (2015 film), French / Swiss film
- Vanity (Titian), oil painting by Renaissance painter Titian

== People ==
- Dahvie Vanity (born 1984), the stage name of musician and alleged sexual predator Jesus Torres
- Vanity (singer) (1959–2016), the stage name of singer and actress Denise Matthews

== See also ==
- "The Golden Vanity", another name for the traditional folk song "The Sweet Trinity"
- The Golden Vanity (Britten), a 1966 setting of the traditional song by the Benjamin Britten
- Golden Vanity, a 1976 folk album by Martin Simpson
- Vanity Fair (disambiguation)
