= Music for the Motherless Child =

Studio album by Martin Simpson and Wu Man
- Released: March 1996
- Recorded: April 1995
- Studio: Christ the King Chapel, St. Anthony Seminary, Santa Barbara, California
- Genre: Blues; English folk; Chinese folk; global music; world fusion
- Length: 63:38
- Label: Water Lily Acoustics
- Producer: Kavichandran Alexander

Martin Simpson chronology
Smoke and Mirrors (1996)	Music for the Motherless Child (1996)	Band of Angels (1996)

Wu Man chronology
Chinese Traditional and Contemporary Music (1996)	Music for the Motherless Child (1996)	Tan Dun: Ghost Opera (1997)

Music for the Motherless Child is a collaboration album between English folk guitarist Martin Simpson and Chinese pipa player Wu Man, released by Water Lily Records in 1996. As with the other album's released on the label, it was recorded at Christ the King Chapel, St. Anthony Seminary, Santa Barbara, by Tamil producer and label owner Kavichandran Alexander, who, also similarly to the label's other releases, curated and oversaw the project as a fusion between the music of two disparate cultures. Neither Simpson or Man had met before the recording of the album, which was done in only a single session that lasted seven hours. Alexander employed vacuum tube recording and took advantage of the church's natural acoustics.

The album features five traditional pieces, mostly drawn from American and European folk music, as well as one written by Simpson. A conspicuous blues influence and style is evident throughout the album. The duo claim that Music for the Motherless Child is dedicated to "the alchemists of both East and West." Upon the release, the album received mainly positive reviews from music critics, who largely complimented the blend of Simpson and Pipa's disparate musical styles. The album has since been re-released as a SACD.

== Background and recording ==
English folk guitarist Martin Simpson had built up a career since the 1970s combining the Celtic folk styles of the United Kingdom and Ireland with American folk styles such as blues and country music, and became acclaimed for his intricate, technical guitar playing skills. He had released four albums between 1990 and 1995. Chinese musician Wu Man, meanwhile, is a virtuoso master of the pipa, a type of lute indigenous to the country. She made her international debut with the album Chinese Music for the Pipa (1993), which was said by one critic to "highlight her extraordinarily emotive playing." Both Simpson and Man had been living in the United States for several years by the time of Music for the Motherless Child's recording.

The genesis of Music for the Motherless Child came from Tamil producer Kavichandran Alexander for his record label Water Lily Acoustics. Each album on the label was a project overseen and produced by Alexander, who brought disparate folk or classical musicians together to fuse their disparate musical styles over the course of an album. In a review of the album, Musicworks described the scenario: "Water Lily Acoustics had a great idea: put a few musicians from different cultures together in a room, turn on a DAT recorder, and see what transpires." The first album on the label, A Meeting by the River (1993) by Ry Cooder and Vishwa Mohan Bhatt, won Alexander a Grammy Award. Music for the Motherless Child is another of these collaborations, with Alexander bringing Simpson and Man together. In a run-down of the label's catalogue, he writes:

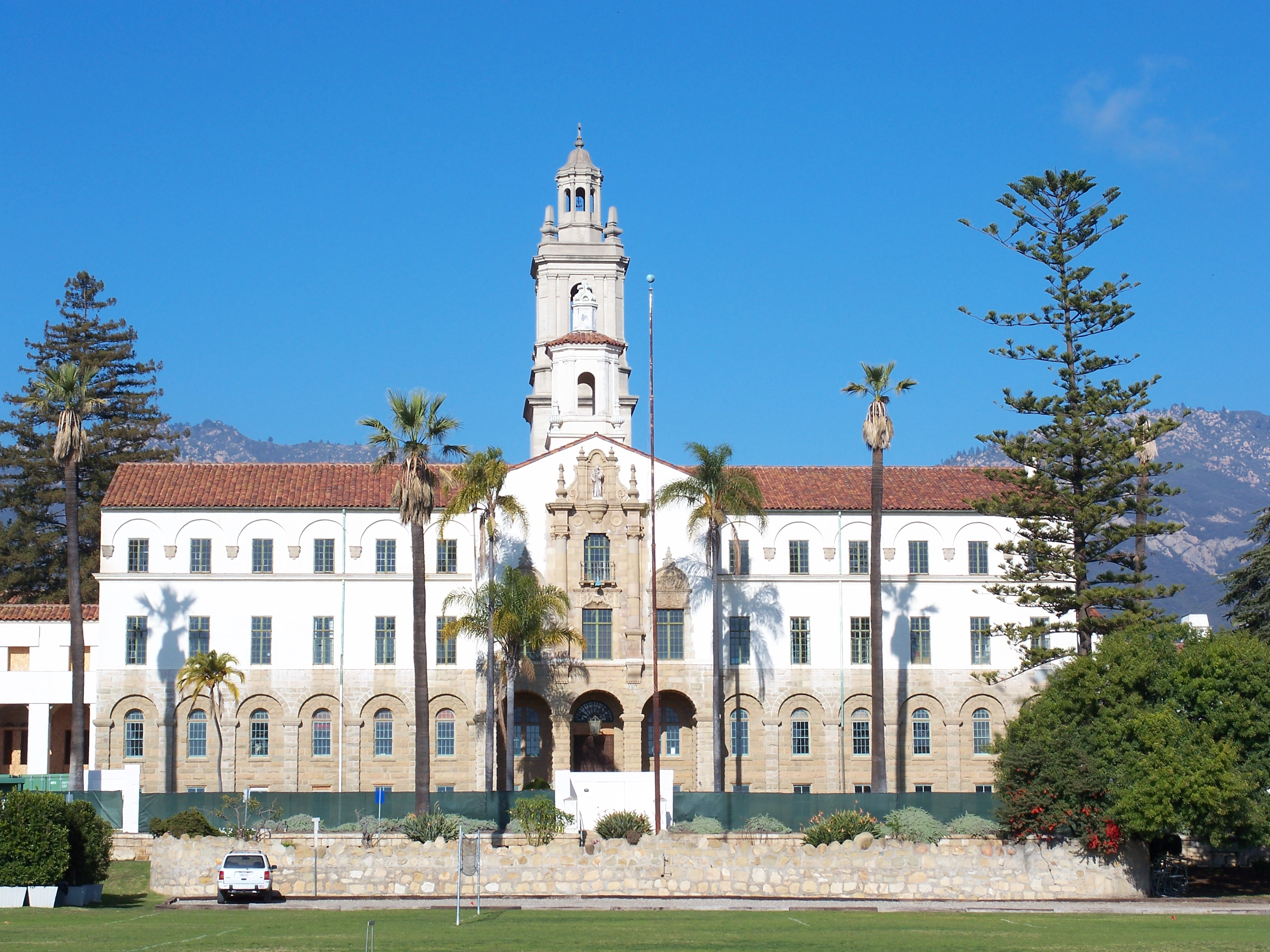
St. Anthony's Seminary, Santa Barbara, the location of the album's recording

"English guitarist Martin Simpson is known for having successfully synthesized a style that blends the best of the finger picking traditions of the British Isles and Appalachia. Wu Man is a virtuoso of the Pipa, a Chinese lute which, like the western guitar, is derived from the Middle Eastern oud."

As with the other Water Lily Acoustics albums, Music for the Motherless Child was recorded at Christ the King Chapel, St. Anthony Seminary, Santa Barbara, California, with Alexander taking advantage of the church's acoustic properties and using vacuum tube electronics which he had custom made. Also similarly to the label's other albums, the two musicians had not met before recording. Simpson had never even heard Man play before, even on a recording. Recording took place in April 1995. While some accounts state that the album was recorded in one, singular 20-hour session from start to finish, it was in fact recorded in a single session from 7:00pm to 2:30am. Simpson, playing guitar, and Man, playing pipa, are the only musicians on the album, while Alexander produced the album. Tim de Paravicini was technician consultant, with technical support from Roger Modjeski. The record was mastered by Chris Rice.

== Composition ==
Music for the Motherless Child fuses Simpson's folk blues-style guitar work with Man's exotica pipa playing, creating what Tim Sheridan of AllMusic describes as "a most unusual sonic world, a place where East meets West and the blues reign supreme." With the exception of "A-Minor Blues", which was composed by Simpson, the material on the album is traditional, and mainly draws from American and European folk music. "A-Minor Blues" takes influence from Appalachian banjo styles and the unsettling E minor playing of Delta blues musician Skip James. Man's pipa work on the track is said to be even more blues-styled than Simpson's guitar work, especially on her tremolo passages. "The Coo-Coo Bird" is a traditional American tune which is similarly derived from the banjo. The album's arrangement of the piece is said to "[blur] the line between bluegrass and Chinese folk," given that, throughout the track, the pipa and guitar parts constantly switch. ABC Radio felt the track had a distinctively Chinese feel. "Dives and Lazarus" is a traditional Irish tune, though here the arrangement more closely resembles blues music.

== Release and reception ==
Professional ratings
Review scores
Source	Rating
Allmusic	4.5/5 stars

Music for the Motherless Child was released by Water Lily Acoustics in 1996, with photography from Michael Sexton. The album is dedicated to "the alchemists of both East and West." It received critical acclaim; Tony Sheridan of AllMusic rated the album four and a half stars out of five. He felt that, as was the case with several other of Alexander's "terrific ventures," Music for the Motherless Child "approaches the common language of a truly global music. Amazing stuff." Reviewing Music for the Motherless Child for the NPR series All Things Considered, writer Banning Eyre described the album as "lovely." Colin Larkin called the album "sparkling" in The Encyclopedia of Popular Music. Musicworks were less pleased with the album, saying that the album works on first listen, but after that, "[t]he music quickly becomes awkward." The album has since been re-released as a SACD, and is archived in Singapore's National Library Board.

== Track listing ==
All songs are traditional, except "A-Minor Blues", written by Martin Simpson.

1. "One More Day" – 5:03
2. "A-Minor Blues" – 16:38
3. "White Snow in Spring" – 6:38
4. "Dives and Lazarus" – 19:36
5. "The Coo-Coo Bird" – 7:14
6. "Sometimes I Feel Like a Motherless Child" – 8:29

== Personnel ==
=== Musicians ===
- Martin Simpson – guitar
- Wu Man – pipa

=== Other ===
- Kavichandran Alexander – production, recording
- Chris Rice – mastering
- Michael Sexton – photography
- Tim de Paravicini – technician consultant
- Roger Modjeski – technician support
