= The Golden Vanity =

The Golden Vanity may refer to:

- An alternative name for the traditional folk song "The Sweet Trinity"
- The Golden Vanity (Britten), a 1966 setting of the traditional folk song by Benjamin Britten

== See also ==
- Golden Vanity, a 1976 folk album by Martin Simpson
