= Wu Man =

Chinese pipa player and composer (born 1963)

Wu Man 吴蛮
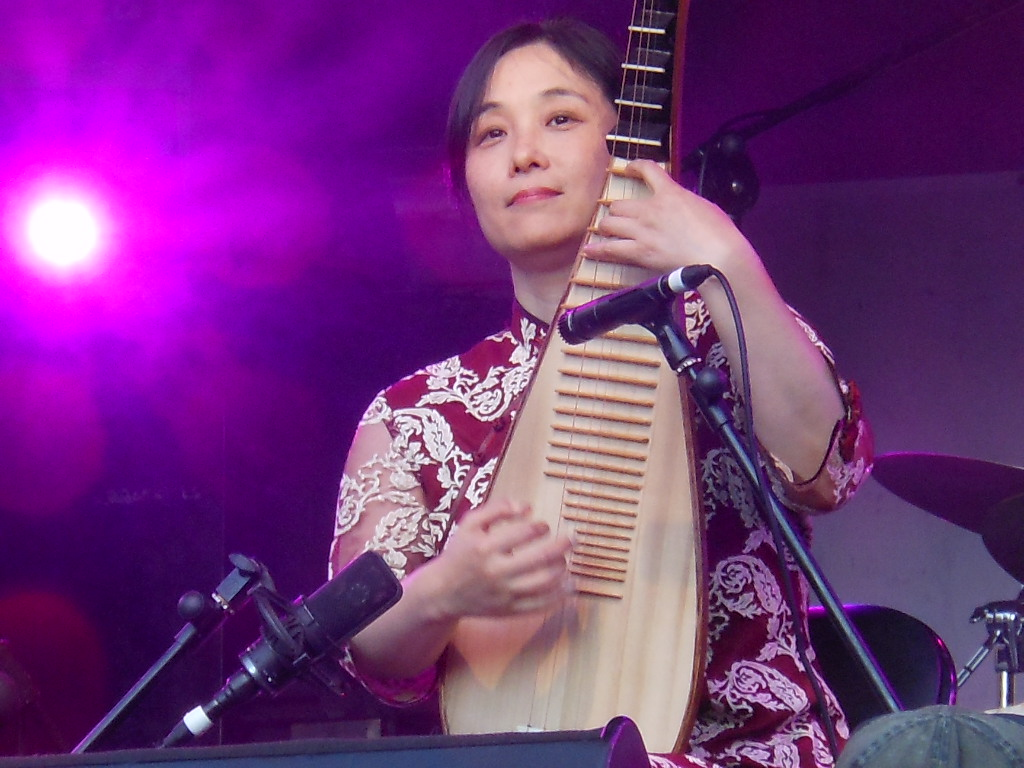
- Wu Man performing at WOMAD in 2011.

Background information
- Born: January 2, 1963 (age 63); Hangzhou, Zhejiang, China
- Genres: Chinese music, world music, contemporary classical
- Instruments: Pipa, ruan, zheng
- Website: www.wumanpipa.org

Wu Man (Chinese: 吴蛮; pinyin: Wú Mán; born January 2, 1963) is a Chinese pipa player and composer. Trained in Pudong-style pipa performance at the Central Conservatory of Music in Beijing, she is known for playing in a broad range of musical styles and introducing the pipa and its Chinese heritage into Western genres. She has performed and recorded extensively with the Kronos Quartet and Silk Road Ensemble and has premiered works by Philip Glass, Lou Harrison, Terry Riley, Bright Sheng, Tan Dun, Zhao Jiping, and Zhou Long, among many others. She has recorded and appeared on over 40 albums, five of which have been nominated for Grammy Awards. In 2013, she was named Instrumentalist of the Year by Musical America, becoming the first performer of a non-Western instrument to receive this award. She additionally received The United States Artists Award in 2008.

== Biography ==
Born in Hangzhou, Zhejiang, Wu Man began taking pipa lessons at age 9. When universities opened their doors to new students in 1977 after the Cultural Revolution had ended, Wu Man traveled to Beijing to audition for the Central Conservatory of Music. At 13, she became the youngest student at the school, and her final audition was covered in national newspapers. While at the Conservatory, she studied Pudong-style pipa performance under Lin Shicheng, Kuang Yuzhong, Chen Zemin, and Liu Dehai. She was first exposed to non-Chinese music in 1979 when Seiji Ozawa and the Boston Symphony Orchestra performed in Beijing, and again in 1980 when she attended Isaac Stern’s master classes at the Conservatory. She received her master's degree (the first such degree conferred on a pipa player) in 1987.

Wu Man first performed in the United States as a member of the China Youth Arts Troupe in 1985. She then moved to the U.S. five years later to pursue a career in pipa performance that would allow her repertoire to extend beyond traditional Chinese music. Upon arriving in Connecticut with her husband (who had begun working on his Ph.D. in chemistry at Yale University), she began working with ensembles such as the Kronos Quartet (see below), and premiered works by Chinese and Chinese-American composers. In 1997, she gave the premiere of Lou Harrison's Concerto for Pipa and String Orchestra with Dennis Russell Davies conducting the Stuttgart Chamber Orchestra at Lincoln Center for the Performing Arts. Written specifically for Wu Man, the work has been recorded twice, the latter of which (with the Chicago Symphony Orchestra and Miguel Harth-Bedoya) was nominated for a Grammy for Best Instrumental Soloist Performance with Orchestra. In 1998, Wu Man was awarded a fellowship to study at the Bunting Institute at Radcliffe College. That same year, she became a founding member of Yo-Yo Ma's Silk Road Project (see below).

In 2003, Wu Man began working with Philip Glass, performing in the premiere of his opera The Sound of a Voice at the American Repertory Theater. She is featured in the recording of a suite from this work, which was released in 2007 on Glass's private label, Orange Mountain Music. In 2004, Wu Man was approached by Glass once again to collaborate on a commission from the Cultural Olympiad on the occasion of the 2004 Summer Olympics in Athens. Taking Orion as its title and inspiration (the constellation can be seen from both hemispheres throughout the year), the piece contains movements representing various countries around the world. The third movement, "China", was co-written by Glass and Wu Man, and features Wu Man on pipa. Additional collaborators include Ravi Shankar, Mark Atkins, Foday Musa Suso, Ashley MacIsaac, and Uakti. The work was premiered prior to the Games, and recorded and released on Orange Mountain Music in 2005.

In 2009, Wu Man curated a pair of concerts at Carnegie Hall as part of the Ancient Paths, Modern Voices Festival. The concerts focused on music from remote areas of China, including traditions of the Dong and Tujia peoples, as well as Taoist ritual. The process of finding these musicians was documented in the 2012 film Discovering a Musical Heartland: Wu Man's Return to China.

Wu Man's achievements in bringing the pipa to new audiences were recognized at the end of 2012 when Musical America selected her as the 2013 Instrumentalist of the Year. She is the first performer of a non-Western instrument to receive this award. Later that season, Wu Man premiered her composition Blue and Green with New York–based chamber orchestra The Knights. Arranged for pipa and string orchestra by Lev Zhurbin and The Knights' Colin Jacobsen, the work is influenced by folk melodies that Wu Man heard travelling through China. That same season, Wu Man premiered Zhao Jiping’s Pipa Concerto No. 2 at the Sydney Opera House with the Sydney Symphony Orchestra, who commissioned the work along with a consortium of North American orchestras.

In 2014, Wu Man was named the first Musician-in-Residence at the Huntington Library. The residency included educational outreach programs, as well as a commission for a new composition. The piece, Three Sharing, was written by Wu Man for pipa, janggo, and shakuhachi, and was premiered on June 17, 2014 at the Huntington's Chinese Garden.

== Collaborations ==
=== Kronos Quartet ===
Wu Man first performed with the Kronos Quartet in the premiere of Zhou Long's Soul for pipa and string quartet at the Pittsburgh New Music Festival in 1992. The Quartet's founding violinist, David Harrington, says he "heard all sorts of possibilities in Wu Man's vivid pipa sound," and the Quartet subsequently commissioned Tan Dun to write a piece for the same instrumentation. The resulting Ghost Opera, a semi-staged work with minimal sets and lighting, received its premiere at the Brooklyn Academy of Music in 1995. The work was later recorded and released on Nonesuch in 1997. On the occasion of Terry Riley's 70th birthday in 2005, the Quartet commissioned a new work from him that would include pipa. After working with Wu Man for over a year to learn the intricacies of the instrument, Riley composed The Cusp of Magic, a work in six movements that included Wu Man on pipa and vocals. All five musicians also play a variety of percussion instruments and toys. The premiere was presented by Cal Performances at Hertz Hall on the University of California, Berkeley campus, and was recorded and released on Nonesuch in 2008. Wu Man's most recent project with the Quartet is a multimedia work entitled A Chinese Home, co-conceived by Wu Man, Harrington, and Chinese theater director Chen Shi-Zheng. The work, which received its premiere at Carnegie's Zankel Hall in 2009, depicts a broad stretch of Chinese history, from the Qing dynasty through the Chinese Communist Revolution to present day.

Wu Man continues to perform regularly with Kronos and was a featured guest artist in the Quartet's 40th Anniversary concerts in the 2013-14 season at the International Festival of Arts & Ideas, Cal Performances, Center for the Art of Performance at UCLA, and Carnegie Hall. She appears on five albums with the Quartet, including Early Music, in which she plays John Dowland's Lachrymæ Antiquæ on the ruan; You've Stolen My Heart, a collection of Bollywood songs by Rahul Dev Burman; and A Thousand Thoughts, the Quartet's 40th anniversary compilation album.

=== Yo-Yo Ma and the Silk Road Project ===
Wu Man is a founding member of Yo-Yo Ma's Silk Road Project, a non-profit organization established in 1998 to foster cross-cultural communication through musical performance and education. Two years after its inception, the Project hosted a workshop at the Tanglewood Music Center that evolved into the Silk Road Ensemble, an eclectic group of musicians representing countries along the Silk Road. Wu Man has performed regularly with the Ensemble since its inception in 2000, recording five albums and touring internationally.

In the 2006-07 season, the Silk Road Project partnered with the Chicago Symphony Orchestra for a yearlong celebration called Silk Road Chicago, culminating in the 2008 album release Traditions and Transformations: Sounds of Silk Road Chicago. Wu Man appears on this album as a soloist, performing Lou Harrison's Pipa Concerto with the CSO and conductor Miguel Harth-Bedoya.

Wu Man has also performed multiple times with Yo-Yo Ma outside of the Silk Road Ensemble. In 1999, Wu Man and Ma performed at the White House, premiering Bright Sheng's Three Songs for Pipa and Violoncello. That same year, Ma was awarded the Glenn Gould Prize and selected Wu Man as the Glenn Gould Protégé. They performed together again in 2003, premiering Sheng’s The Song and Dance of Tears alongside pianist Emanuel Ax, with David Zinman conducting the New York Philharmonic.

=== Miscellaneous cross-cultural collaborations ===
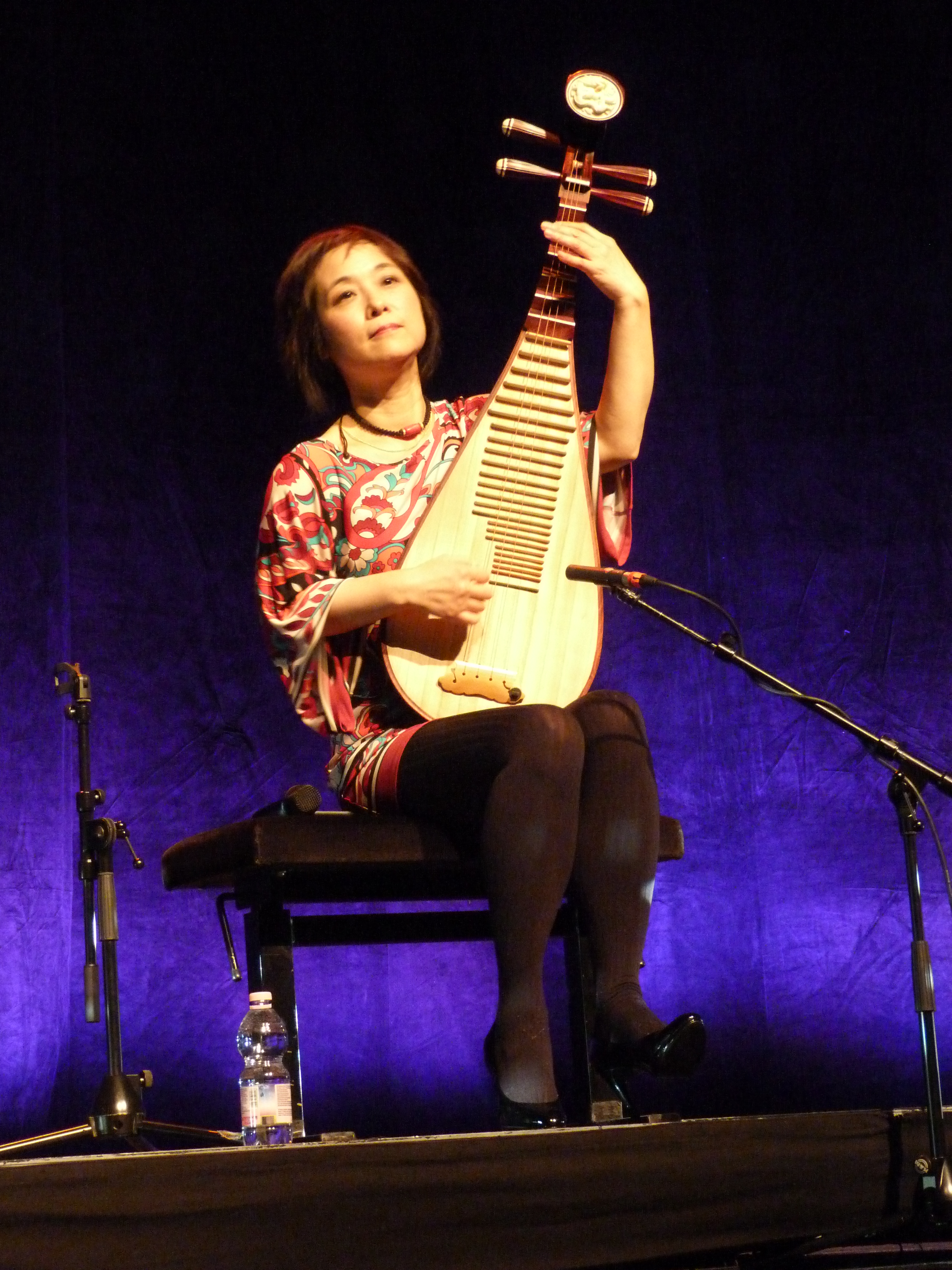
Wu Man performing at WOMEX 15, Budapest

In 2005, Wu Man and composer Chen Yi co-wrote a multimedia work titled Ancient Dances, commissioned by the Walton Arts Center in Fayetteville, Arkansas. Taking its inspiration from the poetry of Li Bai, the multimedia work features video art by Kathleen Owen that incorporates Chinese calligraphy and paintings by Wu Man's father. In performances of the work, Wu Man and percussionist Robert Schulz played in front of two vertical screens that displayed Owen's art. The project forms the first installment in what Wu Man refers to as her larger "Return to the East" project, which includes many of the projects discussed below, as well as her documentary Discovering a Musical Heartland. Later in 2005, she recorded the album Wu Man and Friends with Lee Knight (banjo, Appalachian dulcimer, mouth bow, vocals), Julian Kytasty (bandura, sopilka, vocals), and James Makubuya (endongo, adungu, vocals), which was released on the Traditional Crossroads label in 2006. The album contains the music of Chinese, Appalachian, Ukrainian, and Ugandan folk traditions, arranged to combine these plucked instruments from around the world. Since the album release, Wu Man, Knight, Kytasty, and Makubuya have performed their arrangements in concerts around the U.S., including Carnegie's Zankel Hall in 2006 and the Santa Fe Chamber Music Festival in 2010.

In 2010, Wu Man traveled to Taiwan to study the music of Taiwanese aborigines, leading to a series of concerts in 2012 titled "Wu Man and Aboriginal Friends from Taiwan (吳蠻與原住民朋友)". In these concerts, Wu Man was joined onstage by musicians of the Paiwan, Atayal, and Bunun tribes, performing arrangements of traditional and ritual songs with pipa accompaniment. Performances took place at the Taiwan International Festival of Arts at the National Theater and Concert Hall, Taipei, and at the New Vision Arts Festival in Hong Kong.

With funds from the Aga Khan Music Initiative in Central Asia, Wu Man collaborated with Central Asian musicians to produce the CD/DVD Borderlands: Wu Man and Master Musicians from the Silk Route, released on Smithsonian Folkways in 2012. The album/documentary forms the tenth and final installment in the record label's Music of Central Asia series. The music focuses heavily on the Uyghur muqam tradition, a system of 12 modes that draws loosely from Arabic maqam. She is joined on the album by Abduvali Abdurashidov on sato; Sirojiddin Juraev on dutar; Hua'er vocalist Ma Ersa; Abdulla Majnun on diltar (his own invention, combining the plucked tanbur and bowed satar into a single double-necked instrument), dutar, tanbur, and vocals; Hesenjan Tursun on satar and vocals; Sanubar Tursun on dutar and vocals; and Yasin Yaqup on dap.

In 2013, Wu Man received an Individual Artist Fellowship from San Diego Foundation's Creative Catalyst Fund to pursue a project titled "When China Meets Latin America", collaborating with son jarocho quartet Son de San Diego. In their initial rehearsals, Wu Man and Son de San Diego explored the commonalities in Chinese and Latin American folk traditions, both of which, Son de San Diego's Eduardo Garcia Acosta notes, have "love songs, silvery dawns, birdsongs, broken hearts, tales of sailing, and the sheer joy of dancing." Following these rehearsals, the ad hoc quintet has performed arrangements of Chinese and Latin American folk music in workshops and concerts presented by the Carlsbad Music Festival.

Wu Man performed in several concerts at the 2023 Ojai Music Festival, including two performances of "Ghost Opera".

== Personal life ==
Wu Man lives with her husband, Peng Wang, in Carlsbad, California, where they moved in 2004 after her husband accepted a job there. She and her husband became naturalized U.S. citizens in 2000, two years after the birth of their son.

== Discography ==
Solo or as leader

- 1991 — The Over Lord Removed Off His Armour (China Record Corporation)
- 1993 — Chinese Music for the Pipa (Nimbus)
- 1996 — Chinese Traditional and Contemporary Music (Nimbus)
- 2000 — Chinese Traditional & Contemporary Music for Pipa & Ensemble (Nimbus)
- 2000 — Liu Sola: Spring Snowfall (Also Productions)
- 2003 — Pipa: From a Distance (Naxos World)
- 2005 — Wu Man and Friends (Traditional Crossroads)
- 2010 — Immeasurable Light (Traditional Crossroads)
- 2012 — Music of Central Asia, Vol. 10: Borderlands: Wu Man and Master Musicians from the Silk Route (Smithsonian Folkways)
- 2013 — Elegant Pipa Classics (Wind Music)
- 2014 — Wu Man, Luis Conte, and Daniel Ho: Our World in Song: An Odyssey of Musical Treasures (Wind Music)

Orchestral

- 2004 — Lou Harrison: Concerto for Pipa with String Orchestra, on Lou Harrison: For Strings
  with Rebecca Miller and The New Professionals Orchestra (Mode)
- 2004 — Ye Xiaogang: Pipa Concerto, on Xiaogang Ye: The Last Paradise / Winter / Pipa Concerto / Horizon
  with Günther Herbig and Rundfunk-Sinfonieorchester Saarbrücken (WERGO)
- 2008 — Tan Dun: Pipa Concerto, on Tan Dun: Pipa Concerto / Hayashi: Viola Concerto / Takemitsu: Nostalghia
  with Yuri Bashmet and Moscow Soloists (ONYX)
- 2008 — Lou Harrison: Pipa Concerto, on Traditions and Transformations: Sounds of Silk Road Chicago
  with Miguel Harth-Bedoya and Chicago Symphony Orchestra (CSO Resound)

with Kronos Quartet

- 1997 — Tan Dun: Ghost Opera (Nonesuch)
- 1997 — Early Music (Nonesuch)
- 2005 — You've Stolen My Heart (Nonesuch)
- 2008 — Terry Riley: The Cusp of Magic (Nonesuch)
- 2014 — Kronos Quartet: A Thousand Thoughts (Nonesuch)

with Aga Khan Master Musicians

- 2023 — Aga Khan Master Musicians: Nowruz (Smithsonian Folkways / SAMAA)

with Silk Road Ensemble

- 2002 — The Silk Road Ensemble with Yo-Yo Ma: Silk Road Journeys: When Strangers Meet (Sony Classical)
- 2005 — The Silk Road Ensemble with Yo-Yo Ma: Silk Road Journeys: Beyond the Horizon (Sony Classical)
- 2007 — The Silk Road Ensemble with Yo-Yo Ma: New Impossibilities (Sony Classical)
- 2009 — Silk Road Ensemble: Off the Map (World Village)
- 2013 — The Silk Road Ensemble with Yo-Yo Ma: A Playlist without Borders (CD) / Live from Tanglewood (DVD) (Sony Classical)

with Philip Glass

- 2005 — Philip Glass Ensemble: Orion (Orange Mountain Music)
- 2007 — Suite from The Sound of a Voice, on Theater Music, Vol. 1 (Orange Mountain Music)

with Bang on a Can

- 1998 — Brian Eno: Music for Airports (POINT Music)
- 2001 — Terry Riley: In C (Cantaloupe)

with Liu Sola

- 1994 — Sola: Blues in the East (Axiom, 1994)
- 1995 — Sola & Wu Man: China Collage (Avant, 1995)
- 1999 — Sola & Friends (Also Productions, 1999)

with Henry Threadgill

- Carry the Day (Columbia, 1995)

Film soundtracks

- 1993 — The Wedding Banquet (Rock)
- 1994 — Eat Drink Man Woman (Rock)

Misc. duo

- 1997 — with Martin Simpson, guitar: Music for the Motherless Child (Water Lily Acoustics)
- 2001 — with Yoshio Kurahashi, shakuhachi: Aki No Yugure (Autumn Dusk) (Sparkling Beatnik)
- 2003 — with Tatsu Aoki, bass: Posture of Reality (Asian Improv)

Misc. ensemble

- 1994 — Henry Threadgill: Carry the Day (Columbia)
- 1998 — Lam Bun-Ching: The Child God (Tzadik)
- 2003 — Bright Sheng: Silent Temple with Shanghai Quartet and Bright Sheng, piano (BIS)
- 2004 — Zhou Long: Nature and Spirit (Composers Recordings, Inc.)
- 2006 — Shih-Hui Chen: 66 Times: The Voices of Pines and Cedars (Albany)
- 2012 — Lei Liang: Verge / Tremors of a Memory Chord (Naxos)
- 2018 — Fingertip Carnival with Son de San Diego (Wind Music)

Appearances on anthologies & compilations

- 1992 — An Anthology of Chinese Traditional and Folk Music, Vol. 4: A Collection of Music Played on the Pipa (China Record Corporation)
- 1994 — World Music Sampler, Volume 2 (Nimbus)
- 1995 — A Taste of Asia (Nimbus)
- 1997 — Treasurable Collection of Traditional Chinese Music: Pipa
- 1998 — China: Time to Listen (Ellipsis Arts)
- 2001 — Masterpieces: Pipa (China Record Corporation)
- 2002 — The Silk Road: A Musical Caravan (Smithsonian Folkways)
- 2002 — Chinese Music Classics of the 20th Century: Pipa I (China Record Corporation)
- 2004 — The Classics of CRC Instrumental Music, Vol. 2 (China Record Corporation)

== Awards and honors ==
- 1989 — Chinese National Traditional Music Performance Prize
- 1998 — Bunting Fellowship
- 1999 — The City of Toronto Glenn Gould Protégé Prize
- 2008 — United States Artists Fellowship
- 2006 — Nominated, Grammy Awards: Best Contemporary World Music Album (for You've Stolen My Heart with Kronos Quartet)
- 2009 — Nominated, Grammy Awards: Best Instrumental Soloist Performance with Orchestra (for Lou Harrison's Pipa Concerto with the Chicago Symphony Orchestra)
- 2009 — Nominated, Grammy Awards: Best Small Ensemble Performance (for Tan Dun's Pipa Concerto with Yuri Bashmet and the Moscow Soloists)
- 2011 — Nominated, Grammy Awards: Best Classical Crossover Album (for Off the Map with the Silk Road Ensemble)
- 2013 — Musical America Instrumentalist of the Year
- 2013 — Nominated, Independent Music Awards: Best World Traditional Song (for "Shadiana" on Borderlands)
- 2013 — Nominated, Independent Music Awards: Best Long Form Video (for Borderlands)
- 2014 — Nominated, Independent Music Awards: Best World Traditional Album (for Elegant Pipa Classics)
- 2014 — Nominated, Golden Melody Awards: Best Traditional Album (for Elegant Pipa Classics)
- 2014 — Nominated, Grammy Awards: Best World Music Album (for Our World in Song with Daniel Ho and Luis Conte)
- 2023 — National Heritage Fellowship awarded by the National Endowment for the Arts, which is the United States government's highest honor in the folk and traditional arts

== See also ==
- Pipa
- Kronos Quartet
- Silk Road Project
