= A Meeting by the River =

1993 studio album by Ry Cooder and Vishwa Mohan Bhatt

Studio album by Ry Cooder and Vishwa Mohan Bhatt
- Released: April 1993
- Recorded: September 1992
- Genre: Blues, international, new-age, pop rock
- Length: 39:35
- Label: Water Lily Acoustics
- Producer: Kavichandran Alexander, Jayant Shah

Ry Cooder chronology
| Little Village (1992) | A Meeting by the River (1993) | Talking Timbuktu (1994) |

Vishwa Mohan Bhatt chronology
| Gathering Rain Clouds (1993) | A Meeting by the River (1993) | Mumtaz Mahal (1995) |

A Meeting by the River is an album recorded by Ry Cooder and Vishwa Mohan Bhatt; it was recorded in September 1992 and released in April 1993 through the record label Water Lily Acoustics. This improvised, collaborative album features Cooder on slide guitar and Bhatt on the Mohan veena, a stringed instrument created by Bhatt. A Meeting by the River was produced by Kavichandran Alexander and Jayant Shah, engineered by Alexander, and mastered by Kevin Michael Gray and Paul Stubblebine. It peaked at number four on Billboard's Top World Music Albums chart, and earned Cooder and Bhatt Grammy Awards for Best World Music Album at the 36th Grammy Awards in 1994. The album is included in Tom Moon's 2008 book 1,000 Recordings to Hear Before You Die.

== Composition ==
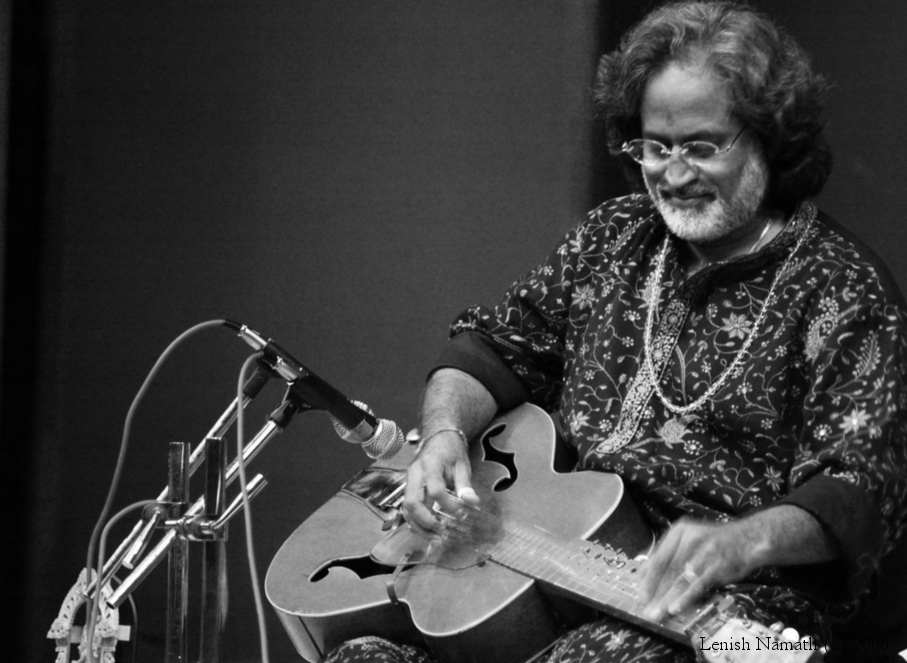
Mohan veena performer Vishwa Mohan Bhatt in 2006

A Meeting by the River was recorded in September 1992; it features Cooder solely on slide guitar and Bhatt on the Mohan veena, a stringed instrument he created. Allmusic's Daniel Gioffre described the instrument as a hybrid between a guitar and a vichitra veena; it is played with a metal slide moving across steel rods along the neck. Cooder had heard a recording of Hindustani classical music performed by Bhatt and was impressed by his playing and the "haunting clarity" of the Mohan veena. Cooder and Bhatt met for the first time less than one hour before recording began; they improvised much of the set; the album's liner notes state, "this recording was unplanned and unrehearsed". The album was produced by Kavichandran Alexander, founder of Water Lily Acoustics, and Jayant Shah. It was engineered by Alexander, and was mastered by Kevin Michael Gray and Paul Stubblebine. Cooder and Bhatt are accompanied by Cooder's then fourteen-year-old son Joachim on dumbek, a Middle Eastern drum, and by Sukhvinder Singh Namdhari on tabla.

The collaboration between Cooder and Bhatt is Alexander's first attempt to record musicians of different cultures together, one of his goals when he founded the record label. Author George Plasketes described Bhatt's playing as "highly nuanced" and said, Cooder performs in a more "loose-jointed, slip 'n' slide style". According to Gioffre, Cooder and Bhatt use improvisation and "voice-like" phrasing, showing melodic performances in an alternating fashion and in unison. The album contains four tracks, three of which are credited to Cooder and Bhatt; tracks range in duration from approximately seven-and-a-half minutes to twelve minutes. "Longing" has a structure similar to a raga. Author Tom Moon said Cooder takes the lead on the hymn "Isa Lei" as Bhatt contributes "elaborate squiggling asides" and "swooping nosedives". In 2011, Bhatt performed "A Meeting by the River" at a music festival in honor of guru Kelucharan Mohapatra. Bhatt said of the song, "Music has no religion and no geographical or linguistic barrier. It speaks a universal language. My composition – 'A Meeting by the River' – aims at explaining this." Bhatt has said he considers working with Cooder his "most special" collaboration.

== Reception ==
Professional ratings
Review scores
| Source | Rating |
|---|---|
| Allmusic | 4.5/5 stars |
| Chicago Tribune | 4/4 stars |
| Rolling Stone | 3/5 stars |

Gioffre wrote a positive review of the album and called Cooder and Bhatt "genuine masters" of their respective instruments. He described the musical interplay between the musicians as "nothing short of astounding" and the album as a rare instance in which a combination of genres works. Gioffre also wrote, "this album is masterfully recorded; each instrument is clear, distinct, and three-dimensional sounding. A Meeting by the River is a must-own, a thing of pure, unadulterated beauty, and the strongest record in Cooder's extensive catalog." Peter Margasak of the Chicago Tribune awarded the album four stars out of four, describing Cooder's performance as "arresting" and Bhatt's as "haunting". Margasak wrote that the fusion revealed a "rare, often transcendental beauty" as the two artists "gently and intuitively" found common ground. Rolling Stone called the album "fruitful" and awarded it three stars out of five.

== Chart performance and recognition ==
A Meeting by the River reached a peak position of number four on Billboard's Top World Music Albums chart. In 1994, the album earned Cooder and Bhatt Grammy Awards for Best World Music Album. Bhatt became one of a few Indian musicians to have received a Grammy Award until A. R. Rahman won at the 52nd Grammy Awards in 2010. Previous Indian award winners had been recognized jointly with Western artists. The February 25, 1995, issue of Billboard, which featured the annual "Indies Spotlight" and covered independent music between the January 29, 1994, and January 21, 1995, issues of the magazine included A Meeting by the River at number ten on its list of the "Top Indie World Music Albums". The album is included in Tom Moon's 2008 book 1,000 Recordings to Hear Before You Die.

| Chart (1993) | Peak position |
|---|---|
| Billboard's Top World Music Albums | 4 |

== Track listing ==
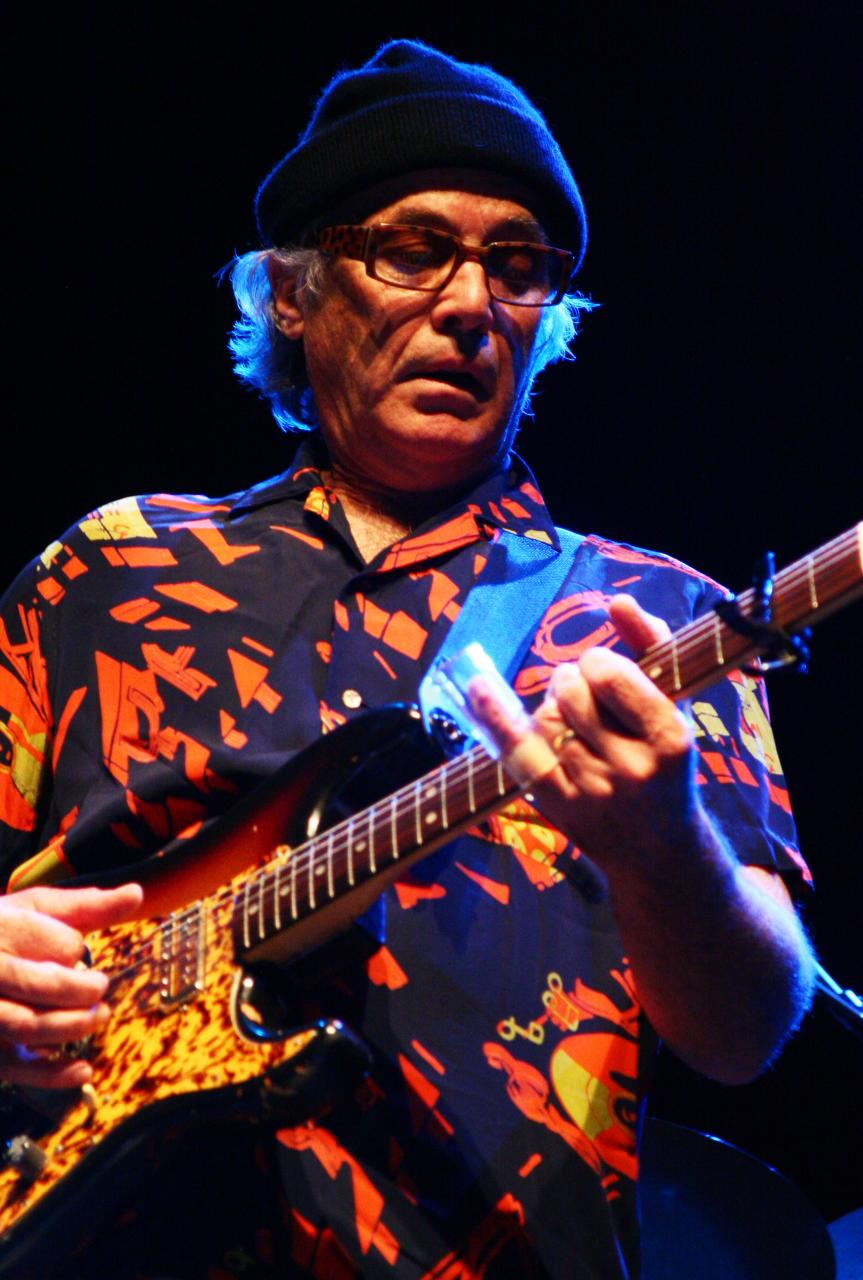
Ry Cooder in 2009

All tracks by Ry Cooder and Vishwa Mohan Bhatt unless noted otherwise.

1. "A Meeting by the River" – 10:03
2. "Longing" – 11:56
3. "Ganges Delta Blues" – 9:57
4. "Isa Lei" (Caten) – 7:39

Track listing adapted from Allmusic.

== Personnel ==
- Kavichandran Alexander – engineer, liner notes, producer
- Vishwa Mohan Bhatt – Mohan veena, performer, slide guitar
- Joachim Cooder – dumbek
- Ry Cooder – bottleneck guitar, guitar, performer
- Tim de Paravicini – technical consultant
- Kevin Michael Gray – mastering
- Sukhvinder Singh Namdhari – tabla
- Rumi – liner notes, quotes
- Mike Sexton – cover photo, photography
- Jayant Shah – producer
- Leslie Shirack – art direction
- Gus Skinas – authoring
- Paul Stubblebine – digital mastering
- Susan Titelman – photography

Credits adapted from Allmusic.
