= Special agent (disambiguation) =

Special agent is a title for a detective or investigator.

Special Agent may also refer to:

- Special Agent (1935 film), an American drama film directed by William Keighley
- Special Investigator (film), a 1936 American western film starring Richard Dix
- Special Agent (1949 film), an American film directed by William C. Thomas
- Special Agent (album), a 1981 folk album by Martin Simpson
- Special Agent Oso, a 2009 Disney television series
- Special Agent, a subsidiary label under St. Lawrence records, which produced Barbara Acklin's first record
