= Down to the Sea in Ships =

Down to the Sea in Ships, a phrase found in Psalm 107, may refer to:

- Down to the Sea in Ships (1922 film), an American silent film
- Down to the Sea in Ships (1949 film), Lionel Barrymore, Richard Widmark and Dean Stockwell
- Down to the Sea in Ships (album) (1956), by Burl Ives
