= Roustabout (disambiguation) =

A roustabout is a type of worker. The word may also refer to:

- Roustabout (film), a 1964 film starring Elvis Presley
  - Roustabout (album), the soundtrack by Elvis Presley to the film by the same name (see above)
  - "Roustabout" (Elvis Presley song), a song by Elvis Presley from the above film
- "Roust-A-Bout", a song by Lester Flatt and Earl Scruggs from the 1967 album Hear the Whistles Blow – Lester Flatt and Earl Scruggs Sing Songs of Rivers and Rails
- "Roustabout", a track on Mark Simpson's folk album Special Agent
- "Roustabout", a song by Bow Wow Wow from When the Going Gets Tough, The Tough Get Going
- Roustabout, 1933 winner of the Grand Union Hotel Stakes horse race
- Mark Roustabout, member of The Force (band)
- Roustabout, a character in the Astro City comic book series
