= Early Music (disambiguation) =

Early music refers to Western classical music composed during the medieval, Renaissance and sometimes Baroque eras.

Early Music may also refer to:

- Early Music (journal), an academic journal
- Early Music (Lachrymæ Antiquæ), a 1997 album by the Kronos Quartet

== See also ==
- Prehistoric music
- Ancient music
