= Isa Lei =

Traditional Fijian song

Performance by the Fijian Police Band

"Isa Lei" is a traditional Fijian farewell song.

== Origin ==
The origin of this song is disputed. One versions holds that Turaga Bale na Tu'i Nayau, Ratu Tevita Uluilakeba composed it in 1916 for Adi Litia Tavanavanua (1900–1983), when she visited Tubou, Lakeba, in 1916. The Fiji Museum holds Uluilakeba's manuscript, but according to its description he composed the song in 1918 while he was in training as a civil servant in Suva. Tevita Uluilakeba was the father of Ratu Sir Kamisese Mara, founding father of the modern nation of Fiji.

Alternatively, "Isa Lei" is the Fijian version of a Tongan love song ("Ise Isa viola lose hina") used to court the then Princess Salote (later Sālote Tupou III). It was written in 1915 and was heard by a visiting Fijian sergeant. From there, the Fijians adopted it to a farewell song, but they kept the Tongan melody.

Lieutenant A. W. Caten, a bandmaster from the Fijian Defence Forces, created a foxtrot arrangement in 1932; he is often credited in modern recordings of the song, including in versions by The Seekers, and Ry Cooder and V. M. Bhatt on their album A Meeting by the River. It was regularly performed by Fijian singer Sakiusa Bulicokocoko.

== Melody ==
Source:

== Fijian ==
Isa! Isa! vulagi lasa dina
Nomu lako au rarawa kina
A'cava beka ko a mai cakava?
Na nomu lako, au na sega ni lasa.

Chorus
Isa Lei na noqu rarawa,
Ni ko sa na vodo ena mataka
Bau nanuma tiko ga,
Mai Suva, nanuma tiko ga.

Vanua rogo na nomuni Vanua
Kena ca ni levu tu na ua
Lomaqu voli me'u bau butuka
Tovolea ke balavu na bula.

(Chorus)

Vanua rogo na nomu yanuyanu
Kena kau wale na Salusalu, (Note: A salusalu is massive garland of flowers and leaves presented to distinguished guests.)
Mocelolo, Bua, na Kukuwalu, (Note: Mocelolo (or mothelolo) is Dendrocnide vitiense, a scarlet fragrant nettle; Bua (or Bua ni Viti or Se-ni-tiare or Tahitian gardenia) is a scented white flower; Kukuwalu is Pandanus joskei.)
Lagakali, baba na rosi damu. (Note: Lagakali is Aglaia saltatorum.)

(Chorus)

Poetic English translation
Isa! Isa! happy visitor indeed,
Sad shall I be when you are gone;
You came—I wonder what you need?
Your going leaves me quite forlorn.

Chorus
Isa Lei, 'tis my great sorrow
That you will sail away to-morrow.
Forget not, when you are away
Our happy hours in Suva Bay.

Your country now is so well known,
That were it not for heavy seas
I'd wish, to me it might be shown
Could I but have long life of ease..

(Chorus)

Yes! your isle-home is so well known,
Flowers for wreaths its woods enclose;
Morecelolo, Bua and the Lagakali, grown
On hillsides, too, the sweet rose.

(Chorus)

Literal English translation
Alas, alas, most welcome guest
Your going fills me with sorrow
Whatever the reason you came,
I feel bereft at your leaving.

Chorus
Oh, such sadness! I will feel so forlorn
When you sail away tomorrow.
Please remember the joy we shared
In Suva, you will always be remembered.

Your country is so well known
If the seas weren't so rough
I'd wish to brave them
And live out a long life there.

(Chorus)

Your island is indeed much envied,
Garlanded with forests
Of mocelolo, bua, kukuwalu
The scented lagakali, and surrounding all, red roses.

(Chorus)

== Tongan text ==
Si'i lile, viola lose hina,
Fisimoto matala he lilifa,
Isa ete nofo 'l he toafa,
To'eloto tangi 'l he potulala.

Ake mai pe va'a he peau,
Toko faingata'a ene ha'u,
Ka neongo si'i lupe ni kuo 'alu,
Ho sino na te u fua pe 'eau.

Chorus
Fakapo he kohai te ne lava,
'E te manatua 'ae 'ofa'anga,
Ne ngangatu mai o alaha,
Feluteni si 'eku 'ofa ta'engata.

Oh my! those viola white roses,
Blooming flowers from yonder, howbeit, I live in a desert,
With the aching heart of loneliness,
Crying from desolate.

Those branches reaches through the waves,
Though difficult and laborious thou attempt,
But lo! the lovebird (dove) will now depart,
Your body's image will be a burden of my heart.

Chorus
Oh no! Who can endure?
The memories of whom I love,
She is my perfume and the fragrance of my life,
The catalyst for my eternal love.

== See also ==
- Music of Fiji
- Music of Tonga

== Notes and references ==
Notes
