= You've Stolen My Heart =

Studio album by Kronos Quartet
- Released: August 23, 2005
- Recorded: June 2004 – January 2005
- Studio: The Plant (Sausalito, CA), Studio D Recording (Sausalito, CA), La Casa Studios (Los Angeles, CA), the Kronos rehearsal space (San Francisco, CA), and hotels in Vienna, Austria, and Paris, France
- Genre: Indian
- Length: 63:20
- Label: Nonesuch
- Producer: David Harrington

Kronos Quartet chronology
Mugam Sayagi: Music of Franghiz Ali-Zadeh (2003)	You've Stolen My Heart (2005)	The Fountain (2006)

You've Stolen My Heart is a 2005 studio album from the Kronos Quartet, featuring arrangements of the music of Indian composer Rahul Dev Burman, with vocals by Asha Bhosle. She sang the original versions of the album's songs and was married to Burman until his death in 1994. The album features keyboards, autoharp, and various percussion instruments in addition to the Kronos Quartet's core string quartet instruments. The recordings also feature Indian percussionist Zakir Hussain and Chinese pipa virtuoso Wu Man.

The album features four instrumental tracks, and eight with Bhosle on lead vocals.

The album was nominated for a 2006 Grammy Award for Best Contemporary World Music Album.

== Track listing ==
1. Dum Maro Dum (Take Another Toke) – 4:43
2. Rishte Bante Hain (Relationships Grow Slowly) – 6:15
3. Mehbooba Mehbooba (Beloved, O Beloved) – 3:51
4. Ekta Deshlai Kathi Jwalao (Light a Match) – 3:59
5. Nodir Pare Utthchhe Dhnoa (Smoke Rises Across the River) – 6:00
6. Koi Aaya Aane Bhi De (If People Come) – 5:36
7. Mera Kuchh Saaman (Some of My Things) – 6:55
8. Saajan Kahan Jaoongi Main (Beloved, Where Would I Go?) – 5:43
9. Piya Tu Ab To Aaja (Lover, Come to Me Now) – 5:28
10. Dhanno Ki Aankhon (In Dhanno's Eyes) – 4:03
11. Chura Liya Hai Tum Ne (You've Stolen My Heart) – 5:09
12. Saiyan Re Saiyan (My Lover Came Silently) – 5:49

== Personnel ==
=== Performers ===
- Asha Bhosle – vocals (1,2,4,6,7,9,11,12)
- David Harrington – violin (1–12), tambourine (2), mouth percussion (2), bow percussion (2), chang (2), autoharp (2,6,7,8), Korg MS-20 (2), vocal percussion (2,6), hammered violin (4), match (4), frame drum (5), harmonium (5), gongs(6), cymbal (6), triangle (7), piano (9,11), trumpet violin (9), glass (11)
- Hank Dutt – viola (1–12), Farfisa Organ (1,2,7,12), Hohner Pianet (2,4,7,8,9), synthesizer (2,4,5,7,9,12), accordion (3,11) theremin (6), organ (6,8)
- Jennifer Culp – cello (1–12), electric bass (6,10,12)
- John Sherba – violin (1–12), bow percussion (2), hammered violin (4), trumpet violin (4, 6, 11, 12)
- Zakir Hussain – Indian trap set (1,4,11), tambourine (1,4,11), madal (1,3,8,11), tabla (2,4,5,7,8,10), tabla tarang (2,6), batajon (3,9), djembe (6,8,9,12), bass drum (6), shaker (10,12), talking drum (12), frame drum (12)
- Wu Man – pipa (1–4,6–9,11,12), liu qin (2,3,4,11,12), electric sitar (2,7), gong (6)
- Gustavo Santaolalla – vocal (9)
- Scott Fraser – electric sitar (2), guitar (11)
- Judith Sherman – finger cymbals (1)
- James Quinn – breath (1)
- Anand Bhostle – vocal percussion (6)
- Enrique Gonzalez Müller – vocal percussion (6), breath (9)

=== Production ===
- Producer – David Harrington
- Co-producers – Scott Fraser and Judith Sherman
- Executive Producer – Robert Hurwitz
- Engineer – Scott Fraser
- Assistant Engineers – Enrique Gonzalez Müller (The Plant), Marc Dimmitt (Studio D Recording)
- Mixing – Scott Fraser and David Harrington
- Mastering – Scott Fraser
- Arrangements – David Harrington, except (3,5,8,10) Stephen Prutsman with David Harrington
- Music Preparation – Hank Dutt
- Design – Doyle Partners
- Photography – Gautam Rajadhyaksha

== Song notes ==
- "Dum Maro Dum" (Hindi: दम मारो दम) – Originally featured in the 1971 film Hare Rama Hare Krishna. Lyrics by Anand Bakshi.
- "Piya Tu Ab To Aaja" (Hindi: पिया तू अब तो आजा) – Originally featured in the 1971 Hindi film Caravan. Lyrics by Majrooh Sultanpuri.
- "Mehbooba Mehbooba" – Originally featured in the 1975 film Sholay.
- "Dhanno Ki Aankhon" – Originally featured in the 1977 film Kitaab.
- "Chura Liya Hai" – Originally featured in the 1973 film Yaadon Ki Baaraat.

== See also ==
- List of 2005 albums
