= Nobody's Fault =

Nobody's Fault or Nobody's Fault But Mine may refer to:

- "Nobody's Fault" (Aerosmith song) (1976)
- "Nobody's Fault", the first part of Little Dorrit, 1987 British two-part film
- "Nobody's Fault" (Sakurazaka46 song) (2020)
- "Nobody's Fault" (House), a 2012 episode of House
- "It's Nobody's Fault but Mine", a 1927 song by Blind Willie Johnson and adapted by Led Zeppelin
- Nobody's Fault But Mine (album), a 1986 album by Martin Simpson
- "Nobody's Fault but My Own", a 1998 song by Beck
