= Mumtaz Mahal (album) =

- N. Ravikiran (chitravina), Taj Mahal (guitar), Vishna Mohan Bhatt (mohan veena)

Studio album by Taj Mahal
- Released: May 16, 1995
- Studio: Christ the King Chapel, St. Anthony's Seminary, Santa Barbara, California
- Genre: Blues
- Label: Water Lily Acoustics
- Producer: Kavichandran Alexander, Dr. Dilip Raval

Taj Mahal chronology
Dancing the Blues (1993)	Mumtaz Mahal (1995)	Phantom Blues (1996)

Professional ratings
Review scores
Source	Rating
AllMusic	3/5 stars
The Penguin Guide to Blues Recordings	2.5/4 stars

Mumtaz Mahal is an album by American blues artist Taj Mahal, N. Ravikiran and Vishwa Mohan Bhatt.

== Track listing ==
1. "Coming of the Mandinka"
2. "Come On in My Kitchen"
3. "Rolling on the Sea"
4. "Mary Don't You Weep"
5. "Stand by Me"
6. "Johnny Too Bad"
7. "Curry and Quartertones"

== Personnel ==
- Taj Mahal - guitar, vocals
- Vishna Mohan Bhatt - guitar (mohan veena)
- N. Ravikiran - lute (chitravina)
