= Righteousness and Humidity =

Righteousness And Humidity

Studio album by Martin Simpson
- Released: 2003
- Label: Topic

Martin Simpson chronology
Bramble Briar (2001)	Righteousness And Humidity (2003)	Kind Letters (2005)

Professional ratings
Review scores
Source	Rating
AllMusic	4/5 stars
Yorkshire Evening Press	4/5 stars

Righteousness And Humidity is a 2003 album recorded by the English guitarist Martin Simpson and released on the Topic Records label.

== Track listing ==
1. "John Hardy" (Trad.) 3:43
2. "Horn Island" (Martin Simpson) 3:38
3. "I Can't Keep Myself From Crying Sometime" (Trad.) 5:47
4. "Easy Money" (Martin Simpson) 2:45
5. "Payday" (Trad.) 3:15
6. "This World Is A Trouble And A Trial" (Trad.) 2:06
7. "Ghosts In The Pines" (Martin Simpson) 1:31
8. "The Coo Coo Bird" (Trad.) 4:04
9. "Love Never Dies" (Martin Simpson) 4:24
10. "Some Dark Holler" (Trad.) 2:29
11. "Rico" (Martin Simpson) 4:19
12. "Georgie" (Trad.) 6:23
13. "Wild Bill Jones" (Trad.) 5:02
14. "The Devil's Partiality" (Gallivan Burwell) 3:52
15. "Rollin' And Tumblin'" (Trad.) 3:58
16. "The Last Shot Got Him" (Trad.) 2:03
