= Liu Dehai =

Chinese musician (1937–2020)

Liu Dehai 刘德海
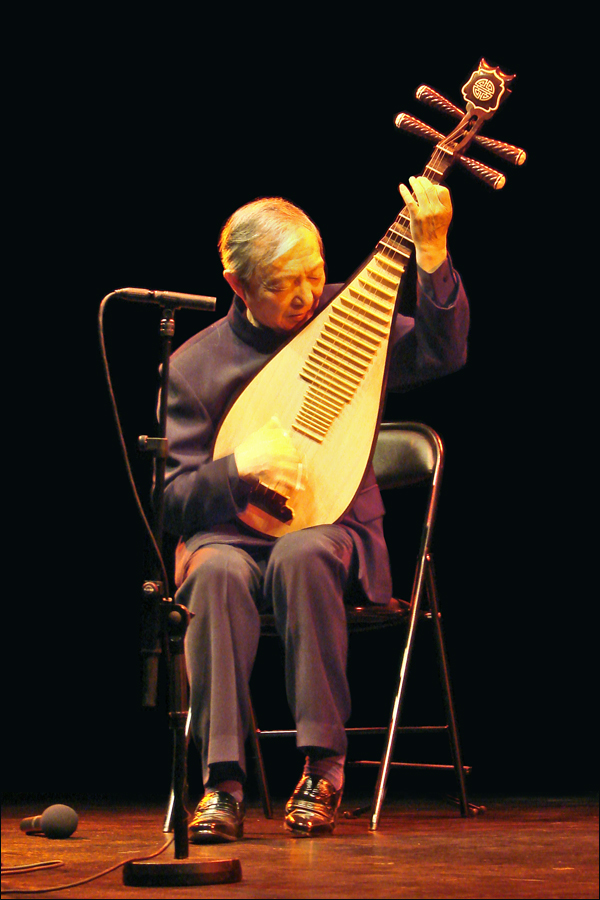
- Liu performing in Paris, November 2010

Background information
- Born: 13 August 1937; Shanghai, China
- Origin: Beijing
- Died: 11 April 2020 (aged 82); Beijing, China
- Genres: Chinese traditional music; Guoyue
- Occupation: Musician
- Instrument: Pipa
- Years active: 1963–2020

Liu Dehai (Chinese: 刘德海; pinyin: Liú Déhǎi) (13 August 1937 – 11 April 2020) was a Chinese pipa player. He was born in Shanghai. In 1954, he learned the instrument under Lin Shicheng's guidance, entering the Central Conservatory of Music in 1957. After graduating in 1962, Liu stayed at the conservatory, serving as a professor. In 1964 he was transferred to the China Conservatory of Music. Since 1963, he held numerous performances in China and more than 30 other countries.

Liu inherited the traditional playing skills, developing new techniques such as "manually roulade", and created new performance techniques like "double shake" and "three shake". Since 1977, he cooperated with the Boston Symphony Orchestra numerous times under the conducting of Seiji Ozawa, to render Little Sisters on the Grassland (Chinese: 草原小姐妹, pipa concerto), Music at Sunset Time (Chinese: 夕阳萧鼓, symphonic poem for a pipa player and a symphony orchestra) and other pieces.

Liu trained many prominent pipa musicians who later had success abroad, including Lingling Yu, Wu Man, Yang Wei, and Jie Ma.

Liu Dehai died on 11 April 2020, at the age of 82.
