= Sad or High Kicking =

Sad Or High Kicking

Studio album by Martin Simpson
- Released: 1985
- Genre: Folk
- Label: Topic Records
- Producer: Tony Eagle, Martin Simpson

Martin Simpson chronology
Grinning In Your Face (1983)	Sad Or High Kicking (1985)	Nobody's Fault But Mine (1986)

Sad or High Kicking is a folk album by Martin Simpson recorded and released in 1985.

Produced at Ideal Sound Recorders, London by Tony Engle and Martin Simpson. Originally issued by Topic Records in the UK, catalogue number 12TS438.

Like most Martin Simpson albums, it includes a mixture of contemporary and traditional pieces.

== Track listing ==
1. "Jazzman" (Holstein)
2. "Shawnee Town" (Dillon Bustin)
3. "Moth" (Anne Lister)
4. "Living Without You" (Randy Newman)
5. "For Jessica, Sad or High Kicking" (Simpson)/ "My Dearest Dear" (Traditional; arranged Simpson)
6. "Icarus" (Anne Lister)
7. "No Depression in Heaven" (Traditional; arranged Simpson)
8. "Let It Be Me" (Gilbert Bécaud, Mann Curtis, Pierre Delanoë)
9. "Stillness in Company" (Jessica Radcliffe)
10. "The Lakes of Ponchartrain" (Traditional; arranged Simpson)

== Personnel ==
- Martin Simpson - vocals, acoustic and electric guitar, lap steel, dobro
- Micky Barker - drums, percussion
- Johnathan Davie - electric bass guitars
- Laurie Harper - fiddle, mandoline
- Rob Mason - harmonica

with

- Dave Clewlow - trumpets, flugelhorn
- Ian Blake - Clarinets
- Andrew Cronshaw - Zither, stellpans
