= Tan Dun: Ghost Opera =

Studio album by Kronos Quartet and Wu Man
- Released: 14 March 1997
- Recorded: January 1996
- Genre: contemporary classical
- Label: Nonesuch (#79445)
- Producer: Judith Sherman

Kronos Quartet and Wu Man chronology
Osvaldo Golijov: The Dreams and Prayers of Isaac the Blind (1997)	Tan Dun: Ghost Opera (1997)	Early Music (Lachrymæ Antiquæ) (1997)

Tan Dun: Ghost Opera is an album by the Kronos Quartet and Wu Man. The album contains five compositions by Chinese composer Tan Dun written in 1994 for string quartet and pipa. As of 2011, the composition was still on the Quartet's program.

== Track list ==
No.	Title	Length
1.	"Act I. Bach, Monks, and Shakespeare Meet in Water"	8:55
2.	"Act II. Earth Dance"	6:47
3.	"Act III. Dialogue with "Little Cabbage""	3:14
4.	"Act IV. Metal and Stone"	10:10
5.	"Act V. Song of Paper"	6:40

== Personnel ==
=== Musicians ===
- David Harrington – violin, water bowl, bowed gong, vocals, one-stringed lute, cymbals, stones
- John Sherba – violin, paper whistle, vocals, cymbals, stones, one-stringed lute, bowed gong, waterbowl
- Hank Dutt – viola, vocals, cymbals, stones, bowed gong, water bowl
- Joan Jeanrenaud – cello, vocals, bowed gong, water bowl
- Wu Man – pipa, soprano voice, vocals, bowed gong, tam-tam, Tibetan bells, paper

== See also ==
- List of 1997 albums
