= Prodigal Son (Martin Simpson album) =

Studio album by Martin Simpson
- Released: 2007
- Label: Topic

Martin Simpson chronology
Kind Letters (2005)	Prodigal Son (2007)	True Stories (2009)

Prodigal Son is a 2007 album recorded by the English guitarist Martin Simpson and released on the Topic Records label. The album won the Best Album award at the BBC Radio 2 Folk Awards 2008 and the track Never Any Good won the Best Original Song award and is included on the 2008 Folk Awards album issued by Proper Music Distribution.

The accompanying book to the Topic Records 70 year anniversary boxed set Three Score and Ten lists this as one of the classic albums. the track Never Any Good is track 7 on the fifth CD in the boxed set.

== Track listing ==
Reference to folk song indexes will be used where identified. These references are from the three major numbering schemes, the Roud Numbers, Child Ballad Numbers originating from Francis James Child and the Laws Numbers from the George Malcolm Laws numbering system.

1. "Batchelors Hall" (Dick Connette, Roud 385) 4:45
2. "Pretty Crowing Chicken" (Trad. Roud179;Child 248) 2:53
3. "Lakes Of Champlain" (Trad.) 4:36
4. "She Slips Away" (Martin Simpson) 3:18
5. "The Granemore Hare" (Trad. Roud 2993) 5:55
6. "Mother Love" (Martin Simpson) 1:52
7. "Little Musgrave" (Trad. Roud 52;Child 81) 5:54
8. "A Love Letter" (Martin Simpson) 3:14
9. "Duncan & Brady" (Trad. Roud 4177; Laws I9) 2:41
10. "Never Any Good" (Martin Simpson) 5:23
11. "Good Morning Mr Railroad Man" (Trad.) 3:27
12. "Louisiana 1927" (Randy Newman) 4:19
13. "La Rivolte" (Martin Simpson) 1:52
14. "Andrew Lammie" (Trad. Roud 98; Child 233) 9:18
15. "Kit's Tune; When A Knight Won His Spurs" (Martin Simpson; Public Domain) 5:18
