= Kavichandran Alexander =

Sound engineer

- Born: Kavichandran Alexander; 1 January 1952 (age 73); Sri Lanka
- Occupations: Audio engineer, record producer
- Website: waterlilyacoustics.com

Kavichandran Alexander (born 3 May 1949) is an audio engineer and record producer. He is the founder of the American record label, Water Lily Acoustics. Alexander was the producer and engineer for the 1993 album A Meeting by the River, featuring Ry Cooder and Vishwa Mohan Bhatt, which won a Grammy Award for Best World Music Album.

== Early life ==
Alexander was educated at S. Thomas' Preparatory School and S. Thomas College Mount Lavinia in Colombo, Sri Lanka. In 1968, he moved to Paris, and at the age of 18, played in the French production of Hair by Shakespeare & Co. He then moved to Brussels to study at the Mudra School of Dance started by choreographer Maurice Béjart.

After a tour of the East, he created a new record label, Indian Shellac Company. After getting married, he moved to Sweden.

== Water Lily Acoustics ==
In 1984, Alexander started the Water Lily Acoustics record label based in Santa Barbara, California. He named the company in honour of his mother, Lily.

Recordings released by Water Lily Acoustics have been nominated twice for Grammy Awards. Alexander was the producer and engineer for the 1993 album A Meeting by the River, featuring Ry Cooder and Vishwa Mohan Bhatt, which won a Grammy Award for Best World Music Album.

Water Lily Acoustics has also recorded Indian musicians, including Ustad Ali Akbar Khan, V. G. Jog, Pandit Jasraj, N. Ramani, Imrat Khan, Zia Fariddudin Dagar, L. Subramaniam, V. M. Bhatt, Kadri Gopalnath, Ustad Rashid Khan, Chitravina N. Ravikiran, Swapan Chaudhuri, and Guruvayur Dorai.

South American, Asian, and African master musicians recorded by Water Lily Acoustics include Flora Purim, Airto Moreira, and Jose Neto.

Symphony orchestras recorded by Water Lily Acoustics to date include the Philadelphia Orchestra (Wolfgang Sawallisch), the Saint Petersburg Philharmonic Orchestra (Yuri Temirkanov), the Saint Petersburg Academic Symphony Orchestra (Aleksandr Dmitriyev), and the Hungarian National Philharmonic Orchestra (Zoltán Kocsis).
