= Purpose + Grace =

Studio album by Martin Simpson
- Released: 2011
- Label: Topic

Martin Simpson chronology
True Stories (2009)	Purpose + Grace (2011)

Purpose + Grace is a 2011 album recorded by the English guitarist and banjo player Martin Simpson and released on the Topic Records label. The album features a mixture of traditional and original material.

== Track listing ==
1. "The Sheffield Apprentice" – 4:15
2. "Bold General Wolfe" – 4:58
3. "Brothers Under the Bridge" (Bruce Springsteen) – 5:14
4. "Little Liza Jane" – 4:08
5. "Brother Can You Spare a Dime" (Yip Harburg)– 2:50
6. "Jamie Foyers" (Ewan MacColl) – 4:04
7. "In The Pines" – 6:01
8. "Strange Affair" (Richard Thompson) – 4:36
9. "Banjo Bill" (Martin Simpson) – 3:17
10. "Barbry Allen" – 6:46
11. "Don't Leave Your Banjo in the Shed, Mr. Waterson" (Martin Simpson) – 1:55
12. "Bad Girl's Lament" – 4:08
13. "Lakes of Pontchartrain" – 5:17

All titles trad. except where noted.

== Personnel ==
- Martin Simpson – banjo, slide guitar, lap steel guitar, guitars, vocals, production
- Andy Cutting – accordion
- BJ Cole – pedal steel guitar
- Andy Seward – bass, production, mixing
- Keith Angel – drums, percussion
- June Tabor – vocals on "Strange Affair"
- Dick Gaughan – vocals on "Jamie Foyers" and "Brother Can You Spare a Dime?"
- Fay Hield – vocals on "Bad Girl's Lament"
- Jon Boden – fiddle
- Richard Thompson – electric guitar
- Will Pound – harmonica
- Barry Phillips – cello
