= Grinning in Your Face =

Grinning In Your Face

Studio album by Martin Simpson
- Released: 1983
- Genre: Folk
- Label: Topic Records
- Producer: Tony Engle

Martin Simpson chronology
Special Agent (1981)	Grinning In Your Face (1983)	Sad or High Kicking (1985)

Professional ratings
Review scores
Source	Rating
Allmusic	4/5 stars

Grinning In Your Face is a folk album by Martin Simpson recorded and released in 1983.

Recorded and produced at Ideal Sound Recorders, London by Tony Engle. Originally issued by Topic Records in the UK, catalogue number 12TS430.

It includes a mixture of contemporary and traditional pieces.

== Track listing ==
1. "It Doesn't Matter Anymore" (Paul Anka)
2. "Little Birdie" (Traditional; arranged Simpson)
3. "The First Cut is the Deepest" (Cat Stevens)
4. "Roving Gambler" (Traditional; arranged Simpson)
5. "This War May Last for Years" (Traditional; arranged Simpson)
6. "Masters of War" (Bob Dylan)
7. "Reuben's Train" (Traditional; arranged Simpson)
8. "Your Cheatin' Heart" (Hank Williams)
9. "Handsome Molly" (Traditional; arranged Simpson)
10. "Townships" (Simpson)/ "Biko" (Peter Gabriel)
11. "Moonshine" (Simpson)
12. "Green Linnet" (Traditional; arranged Simpson)/ "Grinning In Your Face" (Son House)

== Personnel ==
- Martin Simpson - vocals, acoustic guitar, lap steel, dobro, banjo

with

- Bob Smith - drums
- Annette Costello - backing vocals
