= True Stories (Martin Simpson album) =

Studio album by Martin Simpson
- Released: 2009
- Label: Topic

Martin Simpson chronology
Prodigal Son (2007)	True Stories (2009)	Purpose + Grace (2011)

True Stories is a 2009 album recorded by the English guitarist and banjo player Martin Simpson and released on the Topic Records label. The album features a mixture of traditional and original material.

== Track listing ==
1. "Look Up, Look Down" - 3:22
2. "Sir Patrick Spens" - 3:54
3. "Greystones" - 4:19
4. "Home Again" - 4:35
5. "The Wind And The Rain" - 5:21
6. "One Day" - 4:00
7. "Will Atkinson" - 3:59
8. "Kielder Schottische" - 2:43
9. "Lord Thomas And Fair Ellender" - 6:52
10. "Done It Again" - 4:02
11. "An Englishman Abroad" - 4:22
12. "Swooping Molly" - 2:18
13. "Stagolee" - 3:29

All titles trad. except 3, 4,7, 10, 11, 12 by Martin Simpson and 6 by Martin Simpson / Martin Taylor

== Personnel ==
- Martin Simpson - banjola, dobro, guitars, 5-string banjo, percussion, vocals, production
- Philip Selway - drums, percussion
- Keith Angel - drums, percussion
- Danny Thompson - bass
- Andy Cutting - accordion
- BJ Cole - pedal steel
- Muireann Nic Amhlaoibh - vocals
- Nigel Eaton - hurdy-gurdy
- Andy Seward - bass, production, mixing
- Kellie While - vocals
- Jon Boden - fiddle
- Denis Blackham - mastering
- Hugo Morris - Photography
