= Nobody's Fault But Mine (album) =

Studio album by Martin Simpson
- Released: 1986
- Label: Dambuster Records
- Producer: Richard Digance

Martin Simpson chronology
Sad or High Kicking (1985)	Nobody's Fault But Mine (1986)	The Pink Suede Bootleg (1986)

Nobody's Fault But Mine is a 1986 album of instrumental pieces recorded by the English guitarist Martin Simpson and released on the Dambuster Records label. All the tracks included are traditional and arranged by Martin Simpson, except for "Hard Time Killing Floor" by Nehemiah Skip James, published by Wynwood Music Ltd and "Charlie's Boogie" by Martin Simpson and published by Dambuster Music Ltd/Erroldynamic Music.

== Track listing ==
1. "The Granemore Hare" – 5:35
2. "Nobody's Fault but Mine" – 2:05
3. "Lulu's Back In Town" – 2:06
4. "Garryowen" – 4:00
5. "Muskrat / Bonaparte's retreat" – 1:34
6. "Mountain Roads" – 1:10
7. "Yo-Yo Blues" – 1:46
8. "Hard Time Killing Floor" – 4:09
9. "Champagne Charlie" – 1:29
10. "Honeybabe" – 2:58
11. "Dingle Regatta" – 1:25
12. "Charlie's Boogie" – 4:08
13. "Foxhunter's Jig" – 1:17
14. "Sean O Duibhir a'Ghleanna" – 3:56
