= Chura Liya Hai Tumne Jo Dil Ko =

Song by Asha Bhosle and Mohammed Rafi
- Released: 1973
- Recorded: Mumbai, 1973
- Genre: Filmi
- Length: 5:30
- Label: Saregama India Ltd.
- Composer: R. D. Burman
- Lyricist: Majrooh Sultanpuri

"Chura Liya Hai Tumne Jo Dil Ko" (transl. This heart that you've stolen) is an Indian Hindi song by Asha Bhosle and Mohammad Rafi from the 1973 Bollywood film Yaadon Ki Baraat. Picturized on Vijay Arora and Zeenat Aman, it is written by Majrooh Sultanpuri and composed by R. D. Burman and the guitar is played by Bhupinder Singh. It has been remixed and sampled by many other artists.

The song was a hit in the 1970s, and has gained a cult status in India. In 2020, Asha Bhosle named this song as one of her favourite songs. The song was picked by Pinkvilla by one of the most iconic songs of Asha Bhosle on her 89th birthday. The song has continued received attention in retrospectives and discussions of Bhosle's recorded works.

== Cultural impact ==
In 2021, Pakistani politician Maryam Nawaz sang this song on her son's wedding ceremony. In 2022, the song was performed by Indian TV actress Ashi Singh on Valentine's Day.

== Versions ==
This song has been remade and re-sung by many artists including Indian Idol season 12 contestant Shanmukhapriya. The song has also been performed in later television and live music programs.
