= Early Music (Lachrymæ Antiquæ) =

Studio album by Kronos Quartet
- Released: 12 September 1997
- Recorded: 1993–1997
- Genre: contemporary classical
- Label: Nonesuch (#79457)
- Producer: Robert Hurwitz

Kronos Quartet chronology
Tan Dun: Ghost Opera (1997)	Early Music (Lachrymæ Antiquæ) (1997)	Kronos Quartet Performs Alfred Schnittke: The Complete String Quartets (1998)

Early Music (Lachrymæ Antiquæ) is a studio album by the Kronos Quartet, containing 21 compositions, many of which were written, arranged, or transcribed for the quartet. The subtitle is from Dowland's Lachrimae, or Seaven Teares of 1604.

== Compositions ==
The album contrasts adaptations for string quartet of music from the Middle Ages and early Renaissance with 20th-century compositions. The earliest piece is by the ninth-century Byzantine abbess, poet and composer Kassia; the most recent pieces are by the twentieth-century composers John Cage, Alfred Schnittke, and Arvo Pärt. Arranging and selecting compositions from ten centuries of music was intended, according to David Harrington, the quartet's founder, "to find a way of relating vastly different pieces to one time, to find a place in time where the elements meet." Harrington described the contrast between old and new music as crucial to the quartet: "There are moments when the music could have come out of the Middle Ages; there are other moments when it sounds like it's coming out of the Vietnam War, let's say. That contrast is something we've been working with for a long time." Allan Kozinn, writing in The New York Times, describes the album as a concept album in which "the distinctions between old and new are blurred, and the effect is comforting rather than disconcerting."

== Instrumentation ==
As with many Kronos Quartet albums, the basic string quartet is augmented by various other, sometimes exotic instruments. The Swedish song "Längdans efter Byfåns Mats" features a bagpipe, and the traditional Swedish bridal march "Brudmarsch frå Östa" includes a nyckelharpa (a string instrument related to the hurdy-gurdy). Chinese virtuoso musician Wu Man plays two kinds of ruan (a plucked lute-like string instrument) on "Lachrymæ Antiquæ." Perhaps the most exotic instrumentation is found on "Uleg-Khem", a traditional Tuvan song, where the quartet is accompanied by the Tuvan throat singers of Huun-Huur-Tu, who also play igil (a bowed string-instrument), bysaanchi (a cello-like instrument), and doshpuluur (a lyre-like instrument).

== Critical reception ==
Professional ratings
Review scores
Source	Rating
Allmusic	4/5 stars

Rick Anderson on Allmusic praises the album's "overriding mood...of sadness and devotion...Like most of Kronos' best work, this is dark, lovely, eerie stuff." The Jerusalem Post called it one of the most intriguing Kronos albums to date. Allan Kozinn featured it as a Critic's Choice in The New York Times.

== Track listing ==
No.	Title	Writer(s)	Length
1.	"Kyrie I"	Guillaume de Machaut, arr. Kronos Quartet	0:54
2.	"Rachell's Weepinge"	Christopher Tye	1:44
3.	"Långdans efter Byfåns Mats"	David Lamb	3:09
4.	"Lachrymæ Antiquæ"	John Dowland	3:09
5.	"Psalom"	Arvo Pärt	2:01
6.	"Two Studies on Ancient Greek Scales"	Harry Partch, arr. Ben Johnston	2:37
7.	"Long-Ge"	Jack Body	2:51
8.	"Totem Ancestor"	John Cage, arr. Eric Salzman	2:04
9.	"Kyrie II"	Guillaume de Machaut, arr. Kronos Quartet	0:43
10.	"Brudmarsch från Östa"	Trad. Swedish, arr. Mikael Marin	2:53
11.	"Using the Apostate Tyrant As His Tool"	Kassia, arr. Diane Touliatos	3:51
12.	"Synchrony No. 2"	Louis Hardin, a.k.a. Moondog	2:38
13.	"Quodlibet"	John Cage	1:26
14.	"Viderunt Omnes"	Pérotin, arr. Kronos Quartet	11:41
15.	"Kyrie III"	Guillaume de Machaut, arr. Kronos Quartet	1:02
16.	"Four Part Fantasia No. 2"	Henry Purcell	3:01
17.	"O Virtus Sapientie"	Hildegard of Bingen, arr. Marianne Pfau	4:24
18.	"Uleg-Khem"	Trad. Tuvan arr. Steve Mackey	3:15
19.	"Farwell My Good 1. Forever"	Christopher Tye	2:12
20.	"Collected Songs Where Every Verse is Filled with Grief"	Alfred Schnittke, arr. Kronos Quartet	8:13
21.	"Bells"	unknown / not listed	1:28

== Personnel ==
=== Musicians ===
- David Harrington – violin
- John Sherba – violin
- Hank Dutt – viola
- Joan Jeanrenaud – cello

=== Additional musicians ===
- Marja Mutru – harmonium (1, 9, 15)
- David Lamb – bagpipe (3)
- Wu Man – ruan (4)
- Olov Johansson – nyckelharpa (10)
- Judith Sherman – drum (12)
- Huun-Huur-Tu (18):
  - Kaigal-ool Khovalyg – vocals, igil
  - Anatoly Kuular – vocals, bysaanchi
  - Kongar-ol Ondar – vocals, doshpuluur

== See also ==
- List of 1997 albums
