= Vanity Fair =

Vanity Fair may refer to:

== Arts, entertainment and media ==
=== Literature ===
- Vanity Fair, a location in The Pilgrim's Progress (1678), by John Bunyan
- Vanity Fair (novel), 1848, by William Makepeace Thackeray
- Vanity Fair (magazine), contemporary American magazine
- Historical magazines named Vanity Fair, list of historical magazines with the same name, including:
  - Vanity Fair (British magazine), 1868–1914
  - Vanity Fair (American magazine 1913–1936)

=== Film ===
- Vanity Fair (1911 film), directed by Charles Kent
- Vanity Fair (1915 film), a silent film directed by Charles Brabin and made by the Edison Company
- Vanity Fair (1922 film), a silent British film directed by Walter Courtney Rowden
- Vanity Fair (1923 film), a lost silent feature film directed by Hugo Ballin and produced by Samuel Goldwyn, with Prizmacolor sequence
- Vanity Fair (1932 film), directed by Chester M. Franklin and starring Myrna Loy, with the story updated to make Becky Sharp a social-climbing governess
- Vanity Fair (2004 film), directed by Mira Nair and starring Reese Witherspoon

=== Music ===
- Vanity Fair, an overture by Percy Fletcher (1879–1932)
- Vanity Fair, a 1952 orchestral music composition by Anthony Collins
- Vanity Fair, a 1996 album by Seiko Matsuda
- "Vanity Fair", a song by Squeeze from their 1981 album, East Side Story
- "Vanity Fair", a 1990 song by the Ocean Blue
- "Vanity Fair", a song by World Party from their 1997 album, Egyptology
- "Vanity Fair", a song by Mr. Bungle from their 1999 album, California
- "Riding to Vanity Fair", a song by Paul McCartney from his 2005 album, Chaos and Creation in the Backyard

=== Radio ===
- "Vanity Fair", a one-hour adaptation featuring Helen Hayes and Agnes Moorehead first broadcast on 7 January 1940 on Campbell Playhouse
- Vanity Fair, a 2004 BBC Radio broadcast adaptation by Stephen Wyatt, starring Emma Fielding as Becky
- Vanity Fair, a 2019 BBC Radio 4 three-part adaptation by Jim Poyser with additional material by Al Murray

=== Television ===
- Vanity Fair (1939 TV series), a British television series about fashion
- Vanity Fair (American TV series), an American daytime television talk show
- Vanity Fair (1956 TV series), a British miniseries on BBC starring Joyce Redman
- Vanity Fair (1967 TV serial), a British miniseries on BBC starring Susan Hampshire
- Vanity Fair (1978 TV series), a Hong Kong television series
- Vanity Fair (1987 TV serial), a British miniseries on BBC featuring James Saxon
- Vanity Fair (1998 TV serial), a British miniseries on BBC starring Natasha Little
- Vanity Fair (2018 TV series), a British miniseries on ITV starring Olivia Cooke

=== Other uses in arts, entertainment and media ===
- Vanity Bonfire Fair, a fictional character from the 2005 novel Orphans of Chaos by John C. Wright

== Brands and enterprises ==
- VF Corporation, formerly Vanity Fair Mills, an apparel and footwear company
- Vanity Fair (underwear), a brand of underwear owned by Fruit of the Loom
- Vanity Fair, a brand of napkin owned by Georgia-Pacific

== See also ==
- Becky Sharp (film), a 1935 adaptation of Thackeray's novel starring Miriam Hopkins
- Vanity Fare, a 1960s UK pop/rock group
