= The Sweet Trinity =

Traditional song

Song
- Published: 1685
- Genre: Folk song, sea shanty

Audio sample
- One variant of "The Sweet Trinity", American traditional, closest to Child's version C.: file; help

"The Sweet Trinity" (Roud 122, Child 286), also known as "The Golden Vanity", "The Golden Willow Tree" or "The Turkish Revelry" is an English folk song or sea shanty. The first surviving version, dated to 1635, was "Sir Walter Raleigh Sailing In The Lowlands (Shewing how the famous Ship called the Sweet Trinity was taken by a false Gally & how it was again restored by the craft of a little Sea-boy, who sunk the Gally)".

== Synopsis ==
A captain of a ship (the Sweet Trinity or Golden Vanity or Golden Willow Tree of the title) laments the danger it is in; Sir Walter Raleigh complains that it was captured by a galley, but the more common complaint is that it is in danger from another ship, which may be French, Turkish, Spanish, or (especially in American variants) British. A cabin boy offers to solve the problem. The captain promises him rich rewards, which vary between versions, but often contain land, and the promise that the boy may marry the captain's daughter. The boy swims to the enemy ship, bores holes in its hull with an auger, and sinks it.

He swims back to his ship. Usually, the captain declares that he will not rescue the boy out of the water, let alone reward him. In some variants, the boy extorts the rescue and reward by sinking (or threatening to sink) his ship as well, but usually the boy drowns (sometimes after saying he would sink the ship if it weren't for the crew). In other versions, the crew rescues him, but he dies on the deck. In the variant with Raleigh, Raleigh is willing to keep some of his promises, but not to marry him to his daughter, and the cabin boy scorns him. In the New England version recorded by John Roberts (see below), he sinks both ships but is rescued by another one, thus explaining how the story could have been passed on.

== Printings ==
- Round 122, between 1849 and 1862, printed and sold by H. Such, Newsvender, &c. 123, Union Street, Borough, London.

== Recordings ==
- The Carter Family recorded it in 1935 under the title "Sinking in the Lonesome Sea".
- Alan Lomax recorded Justus Begley performing "The Golden Willow Tree" in 1937.
- The Almanac Singers (Pete Seeger on lead vocal) recorded it on Deep Sea Chanteys and Whaling Ballads (1941).
- A.L. Lloyd on The English and Scottish Popular Ballads, Volume III (1956).
- Paul Clayton recorded a version entitled "The Turkish Revelee", on Whaling and Sailing Songs from the Days of Moby Dick (1956).
- Burl Ives released a recording as "The Golden Vanity" on his 1956 Down to the Sea in Ships.
- Richard Dyer-Bennet recorded a version entitled "The Golden Vanity" for his "Richard Dyer-Bennet 5" LP which was released in 1958.
- The Brothers Four recorded the song in 1960 as "The Gallant Argosy".
- Scottish Skifle artist Lonnie Donegan recorded the song as 'The Golden Vanity' for the B-side of his UK number 1 single My Old Man's a Dustman in 1960.
- Barbara Dane recorded a version as "Turkey Reveille" in 1962.
- The New Lost City Ramblers recorded it (as "Sinking in the Lonesome Sea", after the Carter Family version) on Gone to the Country (1963, Folkways FA2491).
- Odetta recorded it as "The Golden Vanity" and it appeared on her second recording for RCA, Odetta Sings Folk Songs (1963, RCA LSP2643)
- The Chad Mitchell Trio recorded it (as "The Golden Vanity") on At the Bitter End (1964).
- Pete Seeger performed the song (as "Golden Vanity") on his television show Rainbow Quest in 1966 and in concert which would appear on the 1975 live album with Arlo Guthrie, "Together in Concert".
- Martin Simpson on the album Golden Vanity (1976).
- Gordon Bok, Ann Mayo Muir, and Ed Trickett recorded it in 1978 on their second album, The Ways of Man.
- Rory Block on the album Rhinestones & Steel Strings (1984).
- The baritone Bruce Hubbard, recorded it as "The Golden Willow Tree" in 1989 for his album For You, For Me, with Dennis Russell Davies and the Orchestra of St. Luke's. It is on Angel/EMI Records.
- Tom Paxton recorded it (as "The Golden Vanity") for a tape called A Folksong Festival in 1986.
- Peter, Paul and Mary recorded the tune as "The Golden Vanity" for their 1990 album Flowers and Stones.
- In 1992 Bob Dylan performed it at a concert. This later appeared as a bootleg album called Golden Vanity (recordings made 1988–1992).
- Steeleye Span recorded it in 1995 for the album Time, but it appeared instead on an anthology The Best of British Folk Rock.
- The Friends of Fiddler's Green on This Side of the Ocean (1997).
- Mike Seeger recorded a banjo version called "The Golden Willow Tree" on his 2003 album True Vine.
- John Roberts recorded a New England version, entitled "The Weeping Willow Tree", on his 2003 album Sea Fever.
- Bruce Molsky recorded a version in the clawhammer style on his album Soon Be Time (2006).
- Loudon Wainwright III recorded a version under the name "Turkish Revelry" on Rogue's Gallery: Pirate Ballads, Sea Songs, and Chanteys (2006).
- Brian Peters recorded it as "The Golden Vanity" on his album Songs of Trial & Triumph (2008).
- Crooked Still recorded the song as "The Golden Vanity" on their Live album (2009) and on Some Strange Country (2011).
- Accordionist Doug Lacy recorded a version for the 2014 soundtrack to the television series Black Sails.
- Alasdair Roberts recorded a version called "The Golden Vanity" on his album Too Long in This Condition
- Lankum recorded a version called "The Turkish Reveille" on the album "Between the Earth and Sky" (2017)
- Jake Xerxes Fussell recorded a version called "The Golden Willow Tree" on the album "Good and Green Again" (2022)
- Fisherman's Friends recorded a version called "The Golden Vanity" on the album "All Aboard"(2024)

== Variants ==
- Aaron Copland used it as one of the songs in his Old American Songs sets.
- Dutch singer Boudewijn de Groot included a Dutch retelling of the song, called "Noordzee" ("North Sea"), on his self-titled 1965 debut album. The translation was written by his close companion Lennaert Nijgh. Dutch singer Geke van der Sloot reworked the lyrics in 2019 and turned "Noordzee" into a protest song against plans to build large wind farms in the North Sea.
- In 1966, Benjamin Britten set an arrangement of the song for boys' voices and piano, as The Golden Vanity (his Op. 78)
- June Carter Cash includes a corrupted version entitled "Sinking in the Lonesome Sea" in her 2003 album Wildwood Flower.

== See also ==
- List of the Child Ballads
