= Down to the Sea in Ships (album) =

Studio album by Burl Ives
- Released: 1956
- Genre: Folk
- Length: 45:08
- Label: Decca

Burl Ives chronology
| Men: Songs for and About Men (1955) | Down to the Sea in Ships (1956) | Women: Folk Songs About the Fair Sex (1956) |

Down to the Sea in Ships was released in 1956 as a 33 1/3 RPM album under the Decca record label. Burl Ives and the Ralph Hunter Singers perform classic sea shanties.

== Reception ==
Professional ratings
Review scores
| Source | Rating |
|---|---|
| Allmusic | 3.5/5 stars |

Allmusic critic Bruce Eder wrote: "Some of it may sound hokey in the 21st century, but in 1956 this was as close to authenticity as most listeners ever got, and it is still compelling listening, if one suspends his disbelief (which Ives makes it easy to do). What's more, the range of material speaks volumes about the sincerity of the effort involved, which may overcome some of the sense of artifice that one finds in records of this sort a half-century or more on."

== Track listing ==
=== Side one ===
1. "Jack Was Every Inch a Sailor" – 2:43
2. "Santy Anna" – 2:34
3. "The Eddystone Light" – 1:17
4. "Haul Away, Joe" – 3:27
5. "You New York Girls" – 2:12
6. "The Sailor's Grave" – 2:51
7. "Leave Her, Johnny, Leave Her" – 1:21
8. "Away Rio" – 2:35
9. "Ben Backstay" – 3:02

=== Side two ===
1. "Wrap Me Up in My Tarpaulin Jacket" – 2:33
2. "Blow Ye Winds" – 2:30
3. "Go Down You Red Red Roses" – 2:40
4. "Hullabaloo Belay" – 1:13
5. "Stormalong" – 2:46
6. "The Drunken Sailor" – 2:17
7. "Highland Laddie" – 3:19
8. "The Golden Vanity" – 3:08
9. "Rolling Home" – 2:26
