= Special Agent (album) =

Studio album by Martin Simpson
- Released: 1981
- Genre: Folk
- Label: Waterfront Records
- Producer: Ric Sanders, Martin Simpson

Martin Simpson chronology
Golden Vanity (1976)	Special Agent (1981)	Grinning in Your Face (1983)

Special Agent is a folk album by Martin Simpson released in 1981.

Produced by Ric Sanders and Martin Simpson, recorded at Moor Green Studios, Rock, Wyre Forest. Originally issued by Waterfront in the UK, catalogue number WF 008.

Typically of an early Simpson album, it embraces both contemporary and traditional pieces and includes a Randy Newman song.

== Track listing ==
1. "Special Agent" (Sleepy John Estes)
2. "Desperados Waiting for a Train" (Guy Clark)
3. Guitar Medley: "The Frost is All Over / The Redheaded Boil" (Traditional; arranged Simpson)
4. "Roustabout" (Traditional; arranged Simpson)
5. "Jamaica Farewell" (Traditional; arranged Simpson)
6. Banjo Medley: "Barlow Knife / Shoot The Turkey Buzzard / Denis Murphy's Polka" (Traditional; arranged Simpson)
7. "Joshua Gone Barbados" (Eric Von Schmidt)
8. "McCrimmon's Lament" (Traditional; arranged Simpson)
9. "Broke Down Engine" (words Traditional; arranged Simpson /music Simpson)
10. "The Demon Lover" (Traditional; arranged Simpson)
11. "You Win Again" (Hank Williams)
12. "I Think It's Going to Rain Today" (Randy Newman)

== Personnel ==
- Martin Simpson - vocals, acoustic and electric guitar, dobro, banjo
- Dave Bristow - piano
- Andy Cronshaw - hammer dulcimer
- Jonathan Davie - electric bass guitars
- Michael Gregory - drums, percussion
- Louisa Livingstone - vocals
- Rob Mason - harmonica
- Ric Sanders - violin
