= Martin Simpson =

English folk singer and guitarist

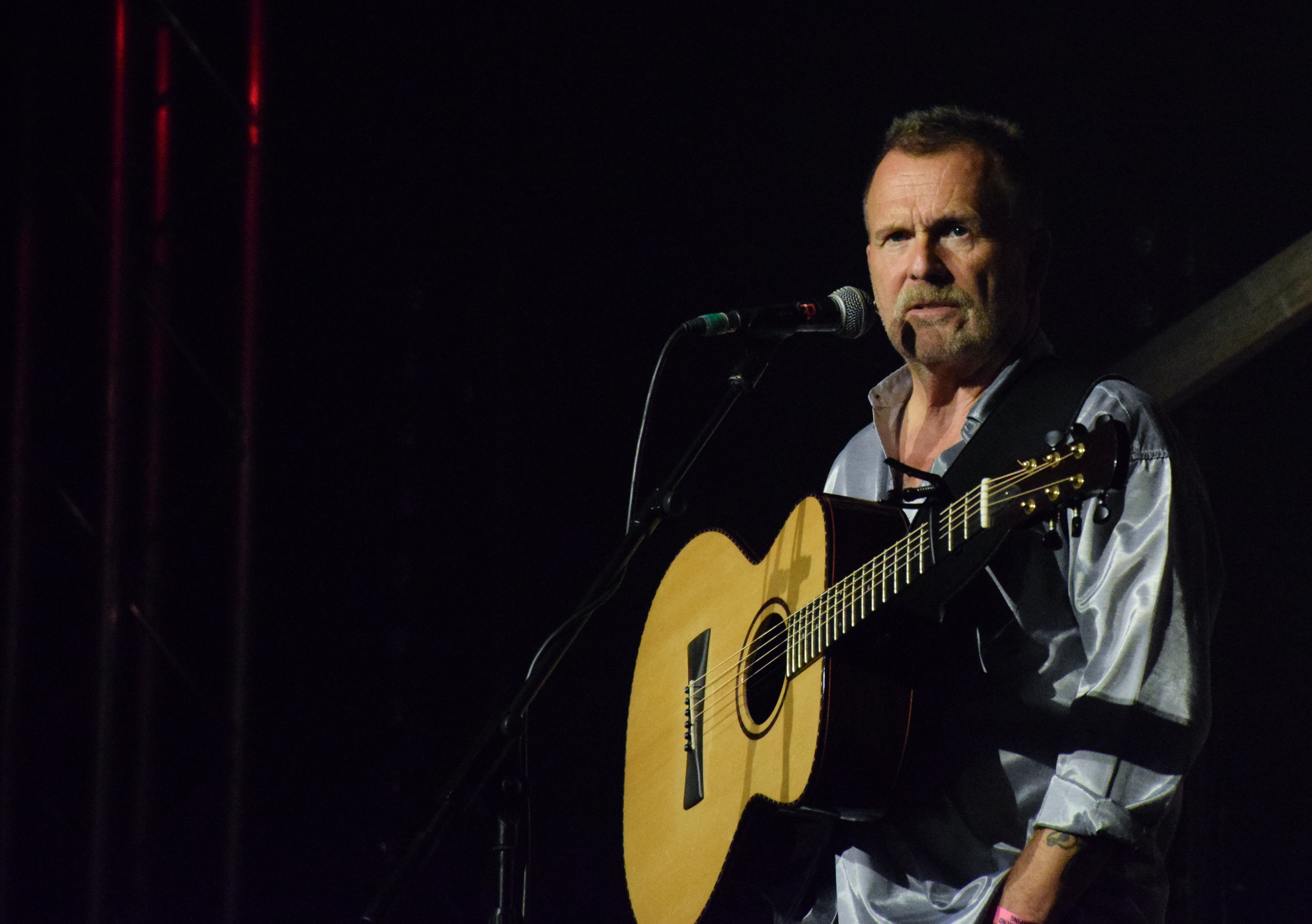
- Martin Simpson at Towersey Festival, 2018

Background information
- Born: 5 May 1953 (age 73); Scunthorpe, Lincolnshire, England
- Genre: Folk
- Occupations: Singer, songwriter
- Instruments: Guitar, banjo, vocals
- Labels: Topic, Red House, Compass
- Website: martinsimpsonmusic.com

Martin Stewart Simpson (born 5 May 1953) is an English folk singer, guitarist and songwriter. His music reflects a wide variety of influences and styles, rooted in Britain, Ireland, America and beyond. He builds a purposeful, often upbeat voice on a spare picking style.

According to his discography, Simpson has appeared solo (21 albums), as a session musician (16 albums), in collaboration (9 albums), in compilations, live, and on performance and instructional DVDs (7). He has also published a book. Between 2002 and 2010, he was awarded multiple honours among the BBC Radio 2 Folk Awards.

== Biography ==
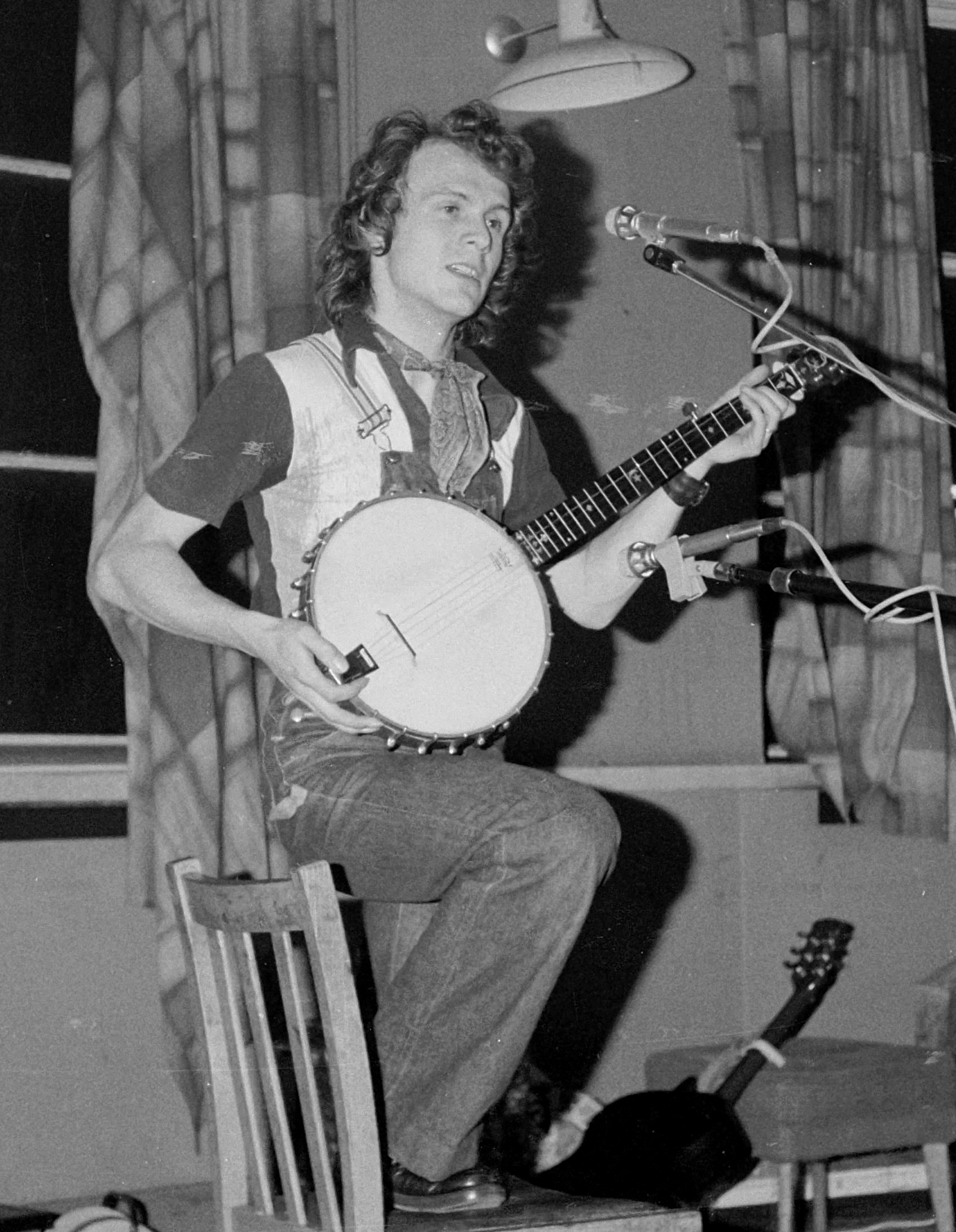
Simpson in 1977, with banjo

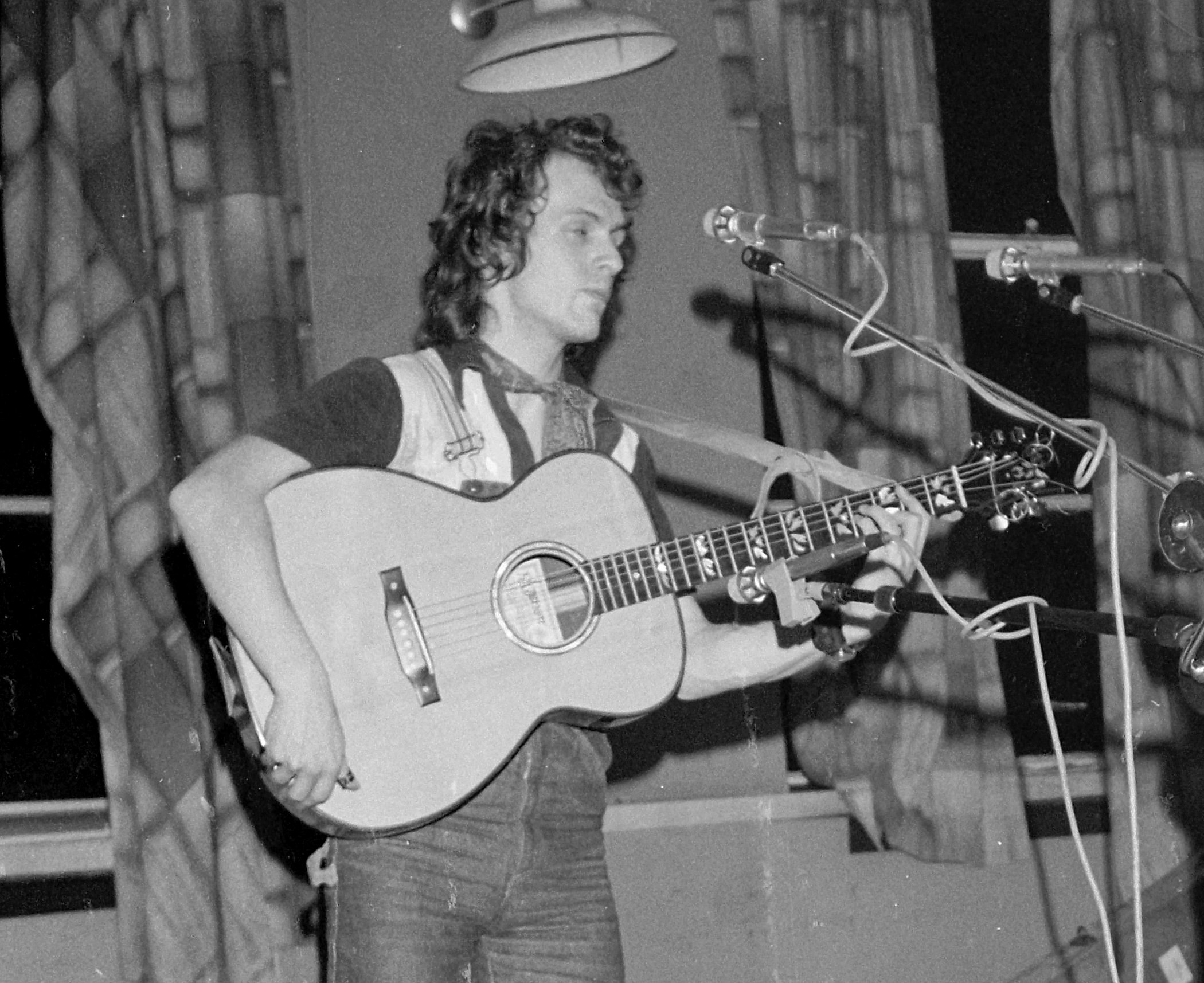
Simpson in 1977, with custom made acoustic guitar

Martin Simpson was born in Scunthorpe, Lincolnshire, England on 5 May 1953. He took an early interest in music, learning to play the guitar and banjo and performing at local folk clubs. In 1970, he dropped out of John Leggott College to become a full-time musician.

In 1976, he recorded his first solo album Golden Vanity. In the same year he opened for Steeleye Span on their UK tour. He performed with Ashley Hutchings' Albion Band in 1979. He also toured and performed with folk singer June Tabor, who did not play an instrument herself. They later recorded three albums together.

In 1987, he moved to Bloomington, Indiana and married American singer Jessica Radcliffe, and shortly afterwards they relocated to Ithaca, New York. He continued recording a mix of traditional and more contemporary material, including several entirely instrumental albums.

Notable work in the 1990s included, in 1995, an album with Chinese pipa play Wu Man, Music for the Motherless Child. The album was produced in a single session, between 7:00 pm and 2:30 am, and blends western and Chinese improvisational approaches, although five of its six tracks come from British or US traditions. In a similar vein was Kambara Music in Native Tongues with David Hidalgo (from Los Lobos) and violinist Viji Krishnan, a mix of Hindu and contemporary songs.

Not until 1999 did he record several of his own compositions on Bootleg USA. It was then, along with Jessica Radcliffe, that he co-founded a record label called "High Bohemia". During his 1994 visit to the UK, he recorded Martin Simpson Live in Oxford. In 1999 he was a session musician for an album by Welsh singer Julie Murphy. The Bramble Briar (2001) was a turn to basics, a collection of English traditional folk songs.

2003 saw the release of Righteousness and Humidity, a set focusing almost exclusively on music from the Deep South, played on a variety of instruments and featuring Steeleye Span's Rick Kemp. This recording was a nominee for BBC folk awards album of the year in 2004. Simpson won the BBC Radio 2 Folk Awards in 2004 in the category of Best Musician. This was followed in 2005 by Kind Letters in which he mines once again the rich seams of English folk music which proved so fruitful for The Bramble Briar.

In 2007 Simpson released Prodigal Son. The 2008 BBC Radio 2 Folk Awards voted it as best album. The fRoots critics poll voted it as the 7th best new album of 2007. It is a mixture of traditional songs and Simpson originals, the highlights of which possess a distinctly southern American flavor. Jackson Browne, Kate Rusby and Kellie While guest star here. In December 2007 he performed on Later... with Jools Holland.

Simpson has written guitar instruction books and recorded DVD guitar tutorials. His career came full circle in 2003 when he teamed up with June Tabor again. In 2004 he surprised everyone by performing at a gig in Nettlebed, Oxford, where he played banjo all evening, without touching a guitar. A readers' poll of the magazine Acoustic Guitar voted him as number 12 in the world in 2005.

Performances of note to the general public include a 2007 appearance on Jools Holland's BBC show and a half-hour set at the Proms on 20 July 2008 broadcast on BBC4. In 2015, Simpson released Murmurs (Topic) with Andy Cutting and Nancy Kerr. In October 2016, Simpson collaborated with Dom Flemons (formerly of the Carolina Chocolate Drops) to release A Selection of Ever Popular Favourites. He released Trails & Tribulations in 2017, featuring 'Blues Run the Game', by Jackson C Frank, and an acclaimed version of the traditional song "Reynardine".

== Awards and recognition ==
He has been nominated 23 times in the 11 years of the BBC Radio 2 Folk Awards, including nine times consecutively as Artist of The Year, which he has won twice. His album Prodigal Son was named album of the year in 2008 and a song from that album, "Never Any Good" was named best original song of the year.

The accompanying book to the Topic Records 70-year anniversary boxed set Three Score and Ten lists Prodigal Son as one of Topic's classic albums. "Never Any Good" from the album is track seven on the fifth disk in the boxed set and "Masters of War" from Grinning in Your Face is track four of the sixth disk. He was a session musician on June Tabor's album Aqaba which is another of the classic albums.

== Instruments ==
While best known as an acoustic guitarist, Simpson started as a banjo player, and also plays the electric guitar. He is renowned as one of the world's leading exponents of slide guitar. His main performance instruments are:

- Paul Reed Smith Angelus – Simpson currently endorses PRS acoustic guitars, and his signature model is available to purchase.
- Stefan Sobell Martin Simpson Signature Model – for many years, Simpson's main performing guitars were made by British luthier Stefan Sobell.
- Fylde 12-fret Custom model built by British luthier Roger Bucknall - Martin owns several Fylde guitars including a Fylde resonator.
- Wolfram guitar slide – Simpson uses a special Wolfram Martin Simpson Signature Slide, made from solid tungsten carbide.

He is known to have owned and played guitars by a number of renowned American luthiers including Ervin Somogyi, Jeff Traugott and Bill Tippin, as well as British luthiers including Ralph Bown. He recently acquired a Turnstone 14-fret cutaway guitar built by English luthier Rosie Heydenrych, and a 12-fret cutaway fan-fret Tirga Mhor model guitar with African Blackwood back and sides made by Rory Dowling of Taran guitars which he has been seen touring the UK with recently.

== Discography ==
=== Solo albums ===
- Golden Vanity (1976)
- Special Agent (1981)
- Grinning in Your Face (1983)
- Sad or High Kicking (1985)
- Nobody's Fault But Mine (1986)
- The Pink Suede Bootleg (Limited Edition Cassette – 1987)
- Leaves of Life (1989) – instrumentals.
- When I Was on Horseback (1991)
- A Closer Walk with Thee (1994)
- Smoke and Mirrors (1995)
- Cool and Unusual (1997) – mainly British traditional ballads.
- Bootleg USA (1999)
- The Bramble Briar (2001)
- Righteousness and Humidity (2003) – collection of American blues, played on acoustic and steel guitar, and banjo.
- Kind Letters (2005)
- Music of Ireland: Airs, Jigs, Reels, Hornpipes and Marches (2005)
- Prodigal Son (2007)
- True Stories (2009)
- Purpose + Grace (2011) (UK chart peak: #106)
- Vagrant Stanzas (2013)
- Trails & Tribulations (2017)
- Rooted (2019)
- Home Recordings (2020)
- Some Kind Of Jubilee (2026)

=== Live ===
- Live (recorded 1994, Oxford) (1997)
- 61 Highway (1999)

=== Collaborations ===
Martin and Jessica Ruby Simpson

- True Dare or Promise (1987)
- Red Roses (1995)
- Band of Angels (1996)

Martin Simpson and June Tabor

- A Cut Above (1980)

Martin Simpson and Wu Man

- Music for the Motherless Child (1996)

Martin Simpson, David Hidalgo and Viji Krishnan

- Kambara Music in Native Tongues (1998)

Martin Simpson, Jessica Radcliffe and Lisa Ekstrom

- Beautiful Darkness (2001)

Martin Simpson, Andy Cutting and Nancy Kerr

- Murmurs (2015)

Martin Simpson and Dom Flemons

- A Selection of Ever Popular Favourites

=== Other compilations ===
- The Collection (1992)
- The Definitive Martin Simpson (2005)
- Three Score and Ten (2009)
- The Full English (2013)

=== Martin Simpson as session musician ===
- Andrew Cronshaw: Earthed in Cloud Valley (Trailer LER 2104) (1977)
- Hot Vultures: The East Street Shakes (1977)
- Andrew Cronshaw: Wade in the Flood (Highway LTRA 508) (1978)
- Hot Vultures: Up The Line (1979)
- June Tabor: Abyssinians (1983)
- June Tabor: Aqaba (1988)
- Albion Band: Lark Rise To Candleford (1980)
- John & Mary: The Weedkiller's Daughter (1993)
- Julie Murphy: Black Mountain Revisited (1999)
- Chris Leslie: The Flow (2002)
- June Tabor: An Echo of Hooves (2003)
- June Tabor: At The Wood's Heart (2005)
- Roy Bailey: Sit Down and Sing (2005)
- Cara Dillon: After The Morning (2006)
- Various Artists: Rubber Folk (2006) (Beatles Tribute)
- Lorne MacDougall: Hello World (2010)

=== Role in the Albion Band ===
He was one of the pool of musicians who played with the Albion Band during their residency at the National Theatre, London, playing for Bill Bryden's company, mainly in the Cottesloe Theatre. He appears on the recording of music from Lark Rise to Candleford, although the album's attributions are inaccurate.

=== DVDs ===
- Acoustic Guitar Instrumentals – Martin Simpson Vol 1 (1993)
- Martin Simpson Teaches Alternate Tunings (2002)
- Instrumentals 2 (2005)
- Martins 4 (2005) – Martin Carthy, Martin Simpson, Martin Taylor and Juan Martin.
- In Concert at the Freight and Salvage (Berkeley, California) (2005)
- Guitar Maestros – Martin Simpson (2006)
- Prodigal Son – The Concert (2009)

=== Book ===
- Cool and Unusual: Creative Fingerstyle Guitar Solos (2000).
