= Mohan veena =

Plucked string instrument used in Indian classical music

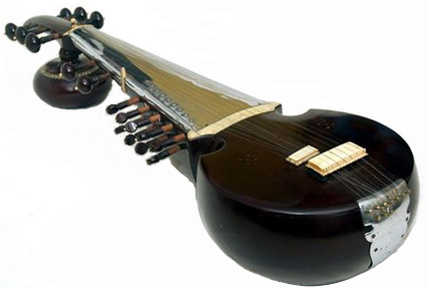
The Original Mohan veena.

Mohan veena refers to either of two distinct plucked string instruments used in Indian classical music, especially Hindustani classical music which is associated with the northern parts of the Indian subcontinent.

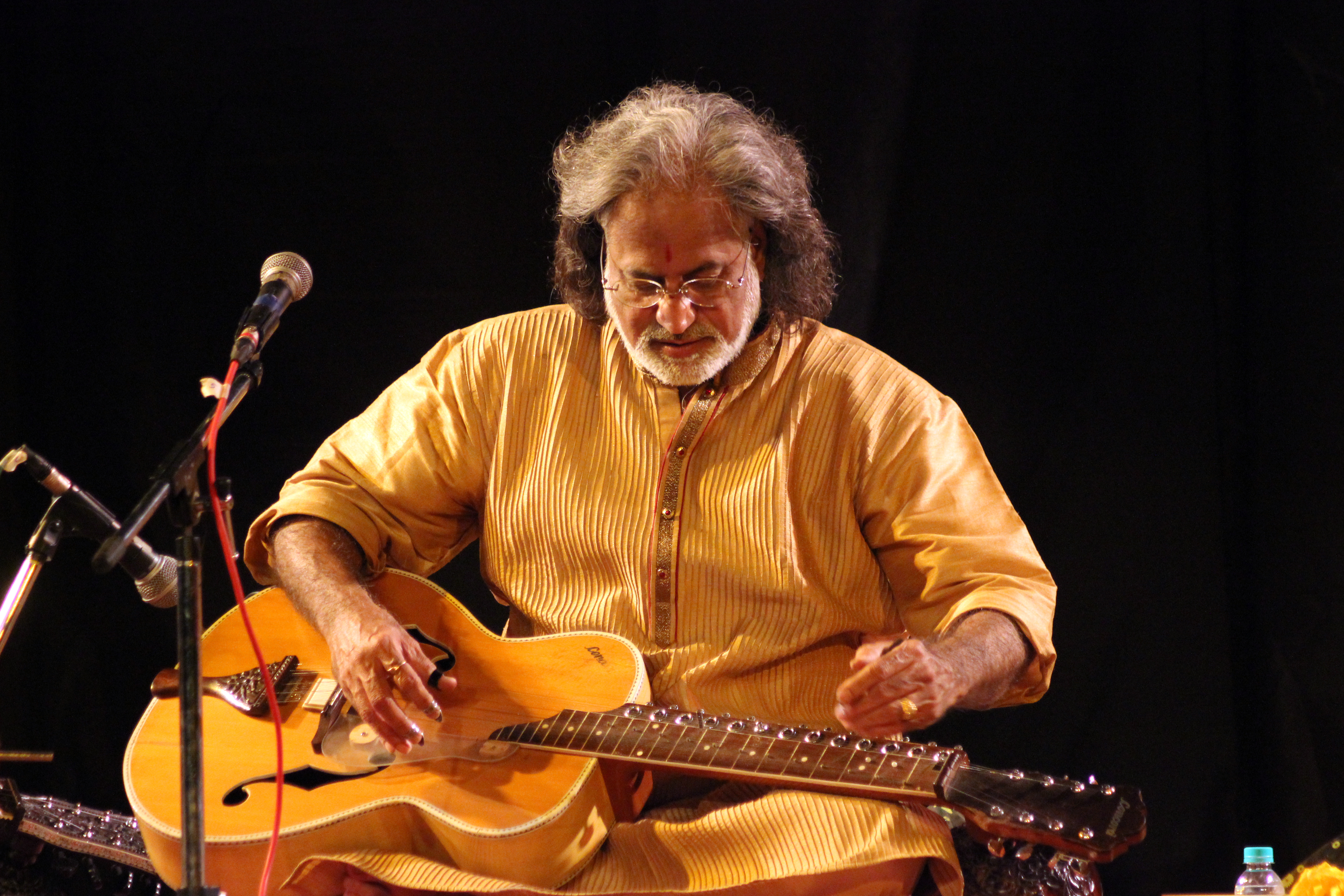
Pandit Vishwa Mohan Bhatt playing Mohan Veena

== Pandit Radhika Mohan Maitra and the original version of the Mohan Veena ==
The first of these was a mix of the sarod, veena and surbahar, developed in 1948 by Radhika Mohan Maitra. In 1949, Thakur Jaidev Singh, the then chief producer of All India Radio, named the instrument 'Mohan veena' after him. Pandit Maitra performed 22 national programs and several AIR recordings with the instrument before his death in 1981. These recordings are now in the public domain.

== Pandit Vishwa Mohan Bhatt's Modified Archtop Guitar ==
The second instrument is a modified archtop Hawaiian guitar, created by Vishwa Mohan Bhatt, and is the instrument most commonly referred to by the name Mohan veena. This instrument has between 19 and 21 strings in total: three to four melody and four to five drone strings strung from the peghead, and twelve sympathetic strings strung to the tuners mounted on the side of the neck. A gourd (tumba) is screwed into the back of the neck for improved sustain and resonance. It is held in the lap and played with a bar like a slide guitar.

Vande Mataram on Mohan Veena played by Vishwa Mohan Bhatt

== See also ==
- Pandit Vishwa Mohan Bhatt
- Slide Guitar
- Sursingar
