= Golden Vanity =

Studio album by Martin Simpson
- Released: 1976
- Genre: Folk
- Label: Trailer Records
- Producer: Bill Leader

Martin Simpson chronology
Golden Vanity (1976)	Special Agent (1981)

Golden Vanity is a 1976 folk album by Martin Simpson. It was recorded and produced at Leader Sound by Bill Leader, and was originally issued by Trailer Records in the United Kingdom, catalogue number LER 2099. The sleeve includes notes by Martin Simpson and Barbara Dickson. Golden Vanity was Simpson's first album. It includes British and American songs and tunes, mostly traditional in origin. The title track is the traditional ballad "Golden Vanity".

== Track listing ==
All tracks Traditional; arranged by Martin Simpson; except where indicated

1. "Beaulampkin"
2. "Snowdrop" (Kirk McGhee)
3. "Bitter Withy"
4. "Cindy"
5. "Golden Vanity"
6. "Soldier's Joy"
7. "Pretty Polly"
8. "Love Minus Zero/No Limit" (Bob Dylan)
9. "George Campbell"
10. "Gotta Little Home To Go To"
11. "Louisiana 1927" (Randy Newman)

== Personnel ==
- Martin Simpson - Banjo, guitar, vocals

with

- Al Schmidt - Harmonicas
- Peter Thompson - Bass guitar
