= The Golden Vanity (Britten) =

Vaudeville for boys and piano

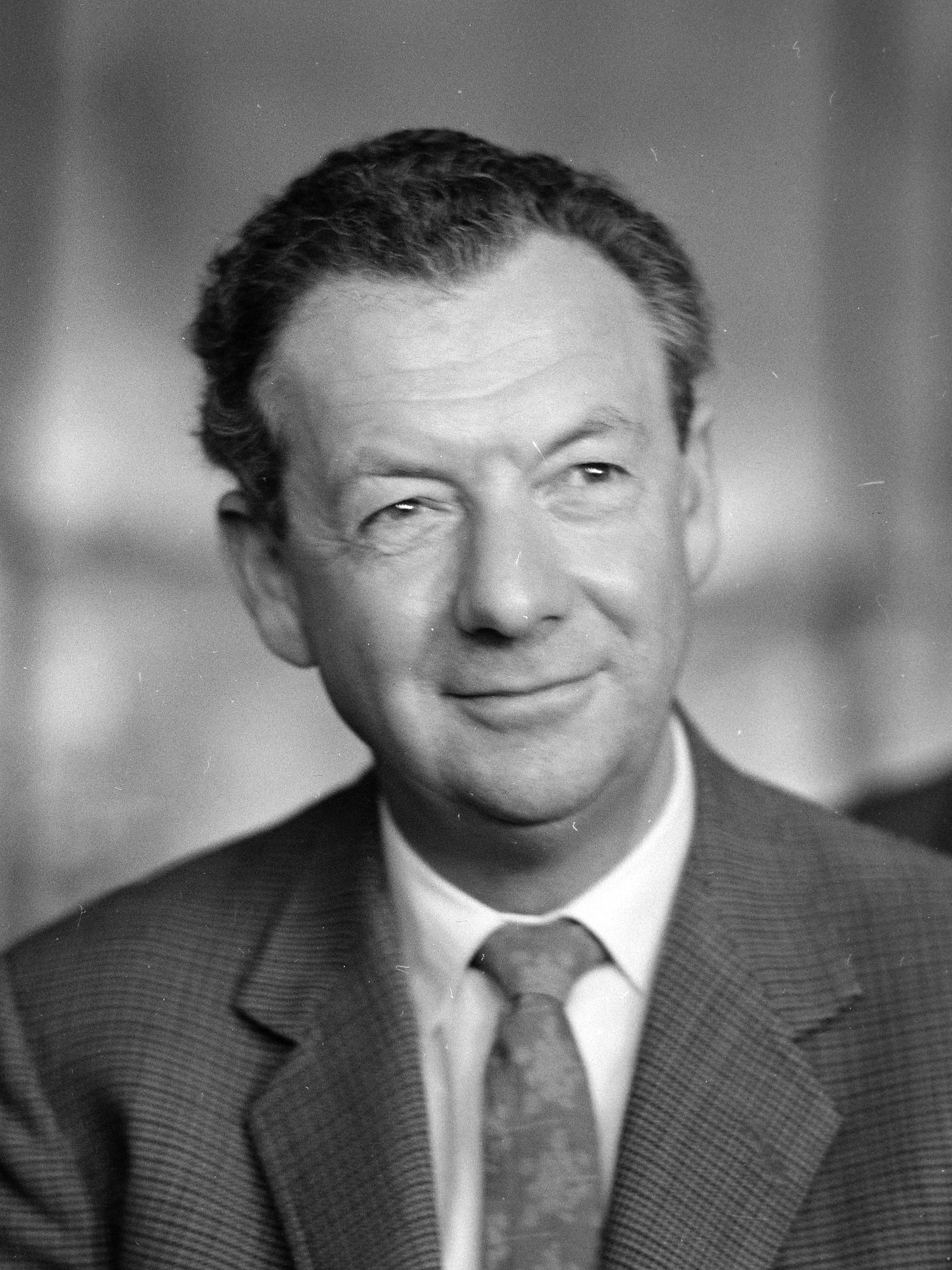
Benjamin Britten in 1965

The Golden Vanity is a musical setting of an adaptation by Colin Graham of a traditional folk song, also known as "The Sweet Trinity", for boys' voices (five soloists and chorus) and piano by the English composer Benjamin Britten (1913–76). The composer described it as a vaudeville. The boys act out parts as well as sing; Britten wrote on the score: "The Vaudeville should be given in costume but without scenery ... The action ... should be mimed in a simple way and only a few basic properties, such as telescopes and a rope, are needed ... A drum should be used for the sound of cannon fire".

== Premiere ==
The Golden Vanity was composed in 1966, and premiered on 3 June 1967 at the Aldeburgh Festival by the Vienna Boys' Choir (Wiener Sängerknaben), to whom it was dedicated. Britten's notes on the score indicate that the work came about as a result of a request from the boys of the Wiener Sängerknaben themselves, to perform on their tours. "They particularly asked that they should not have to play girls' parts", Britten wrote. The Golden Vanity was published as his Op. 78.

According to Graham, the Vienna Boys Choir gave a "riotous" performance at the premiere; but when they returned to England to perform it at the Royal Festival Hall some months later, they were "absolutely shattered and exhausted" after "one of their interminable world tours". Britten "was furious and lodged a formal complaint with the director of the choir for exploiting and exhausting the boys". The work was subsequently dropped from their repertoire.

== Music ==
Britten set one of the darker versions of the song, in which the brave cabin boy is abandoned to drown. John Bridcut has summarised it thus: "It tells the story of a battle at sea, and a cabin-boy who ensures victory for the crew of The Golden Vanity by drilling holes in the pirate ship they are fighting, and sinking it. His captain reneges on his promised reward (the hand of his daughter), and leaves the boy to drown. But the spirit of the boy returns at the end of the piece, just as in Curlew River two years before."

The work includes passing literary and musical allusions to Britten's 1951 opera Billy Budd.

It falls into four sections:

1. "There Was a Ship Came from the North Country"
2. "Then Up Spake the Cabin-boy"
3. "Casting His Clothes Off He Dived into the Sea"
4. "They Laid Him on the Deck"

A typical performance takes about 18 minutes.

== Recordings ==
- 1993 – The Wandsworth School Boys' Choir, Benjamin Britten (piano), Russell Burgess (choral director). Decca CD 436 397-2; recorded 1970
- 1994 – Wiener Sängerknaben, Andrei Gavrilov (piano). Deutsche Grammophon CD 439 778-2
- 2005 – Monnaie Children's Choir, Bruno Crabbé (piano). Fuga Libera FUG507 CD
