= Vishwa Mohan Bhatt =

Indian mohan veena player

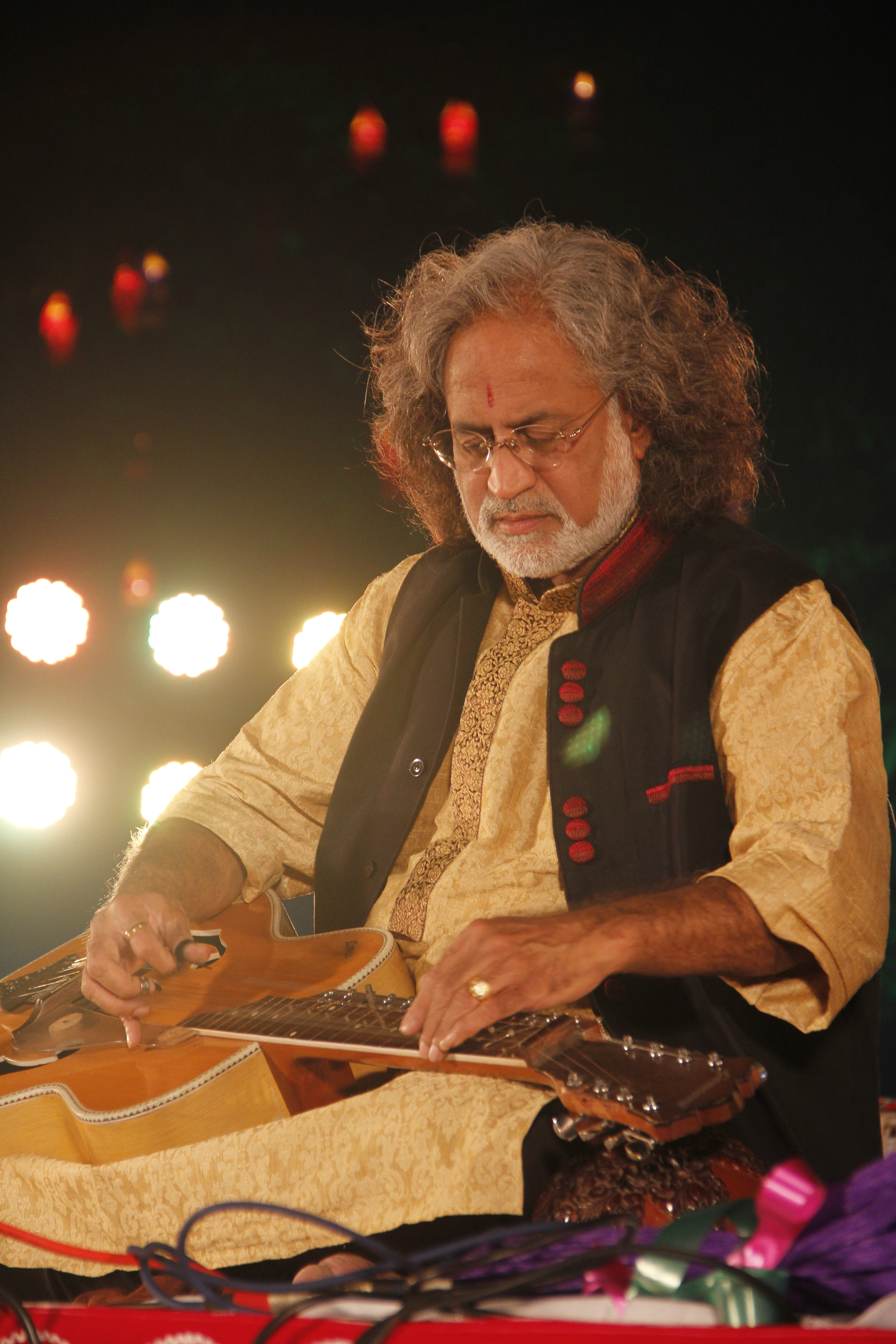
- Bhatt in 2017

Background information
- Also known as: V. M. Bhatt
- Origin: Jaipur, Rajasthan, India
- Genre: Indian classical music
- Occupation: Musician
- Instruments: Mohan veena; guitar
- Years active: 1965–present
- Website: www.vishwamohanbhatt.com

Vishwa Mohan Bhatt, known professionally as V. M. Bhatt, is an Indian Hindustani classical music instrumentalist who invented and plays a modified slide guitar that is widely called the Mohan veena.

== Personal life ==
Bhatt lives in Jaipur, Rajasthan, India, with his wife and two sons. His elder son Salil Bhatt is a Mohan veena player (and also a player of the Satvik veena). His younger son Saurabh Bhatt is a composer who has written music for films, music albums and TV serials. Bhatt's parents, Manmohan Bhatt and Chandrakala Bhatt were teaching and performing musicians, who taught music to V.M Bhatt. His nephew, Krishna Bhatt, plays the sitar and tabla. He is the younger brother of Manju Mehta who is co-founder of Saptak School of Music at Ahmedabad and a trained disciple of Pandit Ravi Shankar.

Bhatt faced severe allegations of sexual misconduct in 2018 by 19 year old Sukhnidh Kaur, who accused him of harassing her when she was 14 years of age. This allegation was made under the MeToo movement, but is not legally verified yet. He and his family have actively denied any such allegations.

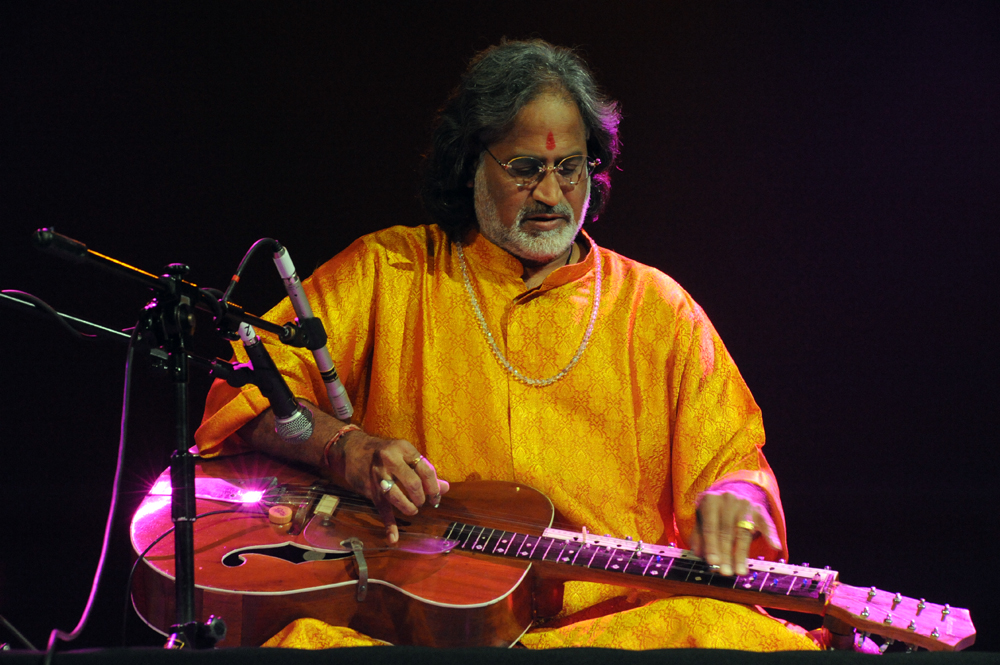
V.M.Bhatt performing in Warsaw, September 2009

== Career ==
Bhatt is best known for his Grammy Award winning album A Meeting by the River with Ry Cooder released on Water Lily Acoustics label. He is also known for other fusion and pan-cultural collaborations with Western artists such as Taj Mahal, Béla Fleck and Jerry Douglas. Exposure such as an appearance on the 2004 Crossroads Guitar Festival, organised by Eric Clapton, allowed his playing to reach a larger audience. In 2016, he performed a duet that has been released online with Kapil Srivastava, another leading Indian guitarist and the founder of Guitarmonk

The folk musician Harry Manx, who studied with Salil Bhatt for five years, plays a Mohan veena. Counting Crows' bassist Matt Malley also plays a Mohan veena and is a student and friend of Bhatt. Australian musician Lawrie Minson also learned Mohan veena from Salil.

== Select discography ==
- 1992 - Guitar A La Hindustan, Magnasound (India)
- 1992 - Saradamani, Water Lily Acoustics
- 1993 - Gathering Rain Clouds, Water Lily Acoustics
- 1993 - A Meeting by the River (with Ry Cooder), Water Lily Acoustics
- 1995 - Bourbon & Rosewater (with Jerry Douglas & Edgar Meyer), Water Lily Acoustics
- 1995 - Mumtaz Mahal (with Taj Mahal & N. Ravikiran), Water Lily Acoustics
- 1996 - Saltanah (with Simon Shaheen), Water Lily Acoustics
- 1996 - Tabula Rasā (with Béla Fleck & Jie-Bing Chen), Water Lily Acoustics
- 1996 - Sounds of Strings, Music today, India
- 1997 - Iruvar (Original Motion Picture Soundtrack, A. R. Rahman)
- 2002 - Indian Delta (with Sandeep Das), Sense World Music, UK
- 2008 - Mohan's Veena, Times Music, India
- 2010 - Desert Slide, Times Music, India
- 2010 - Mohan's Veena II, Times Music, India
- 2011 - Groove Caravan, Deeksha Records, Canada
- 2012- "Morning Mist", Bihaan Music, Kolkatta, India
- 2014 - OMKARA - The Sound of Divine Love (with Rupam Sarmah)
- 2015-"Vishwa Ranjini"-Bihaan Music, Kolkatta, India

== Awards ==
- 1993 Grammy Award (Best World Music Album) – A Meeting by the River(With Ry Cooder)
- Sangeet Natak Akademi Award, 1998
- Padma Shri, 2002
- Padma Bhushan, 2017
