= Water Lily Acoustics =

Official logo of Water Lily Acoustics

Water Lily Acoustics is an American record label in Santa Barbara, California founded in 1985 by Kavichandran Alexander, a Tamil from Sri Lanka. Alexander is a record producer and audio engineer. He named the label after his mother, Lily. The label primarily releases recordings of Indian classical music and collaborations by musicians from around the world. At its inception, Alexander emphasized Eastern musicians, espousing the belief that they had rarely been recorded with proper sound quality compared to their Western counterparts. He started including music from outside Asia. Alexander has recorded and produced musicians such as José Neto, Ali Akbar Khan, V. G. Jog, Vishwa Mohan Bhatt, Ry Cooder, Jiebing Chen, Béla Fleck, Taj Mahal, Papa Susso, Jerry Douglas, Simon Shaheen, Hungarian National Philharmonic, Philadelphia Orchestra, and the Saint Petersburg Philharmonic Orchestra. Music he has recorded has appeared in the films Angel Eyes, Dead Man Walking, and Meet the Fockers.

== See also ==
- List of record labels
