= Kronos Quartet discography =

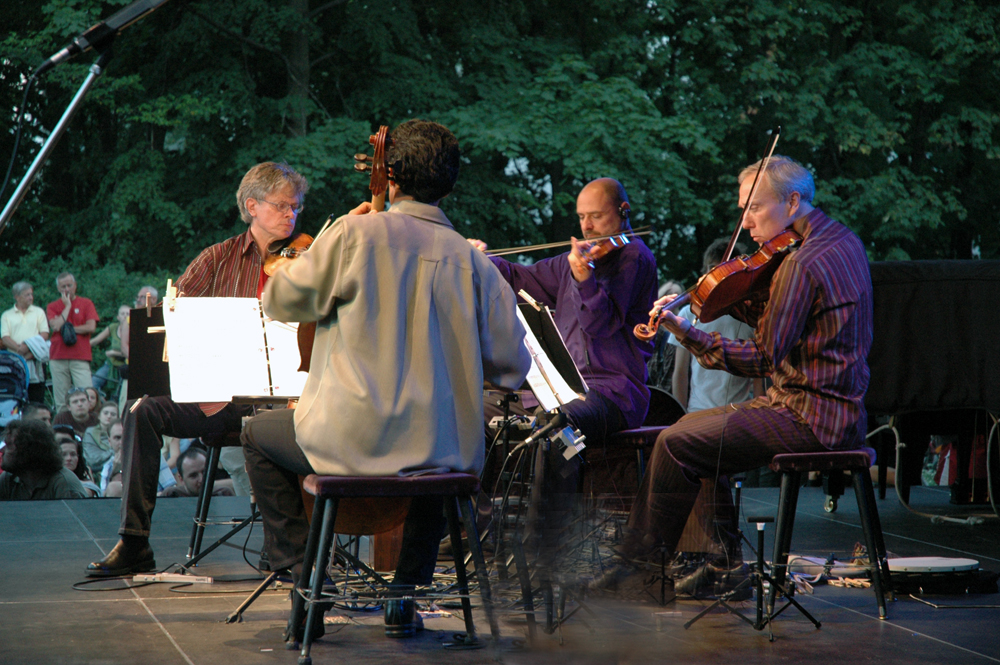
- Kronos Quartet live in Warsaw, Poland. Photograph by Henryk Kotowski.
- Studio albums: 64
- Soundtrack albums: 5
- Compilation albums: 2
- Video albums: 3
- Contributions: 29

The discography of the Kronos Quartet includes 64 studio albums, 2 compilations, 5 soundtracks, and 29 contributions to other artists' records. The Kronos Quartet plays classical, pop, rock, jazz, folk, world, and contemporary classical music and was founded in 1973 by violinist David Harrington. Since 1978, they have been based in San Francisco, California. Since 1985, the quartet's music has been released on Nonesuch Records.

Early recordings by the quartet contain contemporary classical music and adaptations of more popular music, such as jazz and rock and roll. Since the 1980s, and especially with the release of Cadenza on the Night Plain, written as a collaboration between composer Terry Riley and the quartet, much of the quartet's repertoire and album releases contain music written especially for them by composers such as Riley, Philip Glass, Henryk Górecki, Ástor Piazzolla, Kevin Volans, and Aleksandra Vrebalov. Their music "covers a who's who of 20th century-composers", as one critic noted in 1998.

Kronos has recorded five soundtracks, including the 1998 score by Philip Glass for the scoreless (except for Tchaikovsky title music) 1931 sound movie Dracula, and has contributed to the soundtracks of five other movies, including Heat and 21 Grams. Outside the genre of classical music, Kronos has collaborated with a great number of other artists, especially pop artists, such as Joan Armatrading, Dave Matthews Band, Andy Summers, Nelly Furtado, and Nine Inch Nails.

The quartet has achieved considerable commercial and critical success and by 1998 (the year of the quartet's 25th anniversary) had sold more than 1.5 million albums. Many of Kronos' albums have ranked on various Billboard charts; the 1992 album Pieces of Africa reached #1 in the Top World Albums chart. The quartet won a Grammy for the 2003 album Lyric Suite.

== Studio albums ==
Year	Album details	Notes
1979	Music of Dane Rudhyar: Released: 1979; Label: Composers Recordings, Inc. (CRI) SD 418; Format: LP; later CD	Their first release; includes two string quartets, "Advent" and "Crisis and Overcoming"
1982	In Formation: Released: 1982; Label: Reference (#9); Format: LP; CD	"In imaging, transient accuracy and timbre, one of the finest string quartet discs ever issued."
1985	Monk Suite: Kronos Quartet Plays Music of Thelonious Monk: Released: 1985; Label: Landmark (#1505); Format: LP, CD, MP3	Compositions by Thelonious Monk. With Ron Carter (bass improvisation). Re-released in 2005 as CD, on Savoy. Re-issued with Music of Bill Evans on 2CD as 32 Jazz: The Complete Landmark Sessions.
1985	Terry Riley: Cadenza on the Night Plain: Released: 1985; Label: Gramavision R2 79444; Format: 2LP, CD	Collaboration between composer Terry Riley and the Quartet. "Charming music that grows on one, in really committed performances." Rereleased on CD (Gramavision #18-7014-2), August 1, 1992; rereleased on CD (Hanibal #1509), January 31, 2006.
1986	Music of Bill Evans: Released: 1986; Label: Landmark (#1510), Savoy (#17405); Format: LP, CD	Compositions written by or associated with Bill Evans. With Jim Hall (guitar) and Eddie Gómez (bass). Leonard Feather gave the album five stars; Stephen Holden, for the New York Times, named it "Jazz Album of the Week." Reissued with Monk Suite on 2CD as 32 Jazz: The Complete Landmark Sessions.
1986	Kronos Quartet: Released: August 15, 1986; Label: Nonesuch (#79111); Format: LP, CD, MP3	Music by Peter Sculthorpe, Aulis Sallinen, Philip Glass, Conlon Nancarrow, and an arrangement of Jimi Hendrix's "Purple Haze." "The best recorded anthology yet to capture the heady diversity of musical idioms that this San Francisco quartet espouses."
1987	White Man Sleeps: Released: July 15, 1987; Label: Nonesuch (#79163); Format: LP, CD, MP3	Ten compositions, by Kevin Volans and others.
1988	Winter Was Hard: Released: September 30, 1988; Label: Nonesuch (#79181); Format: LP, CD, MP3	Music by Aulis Sallinen, Terry Riley, Arvo Pärt, Anton Webern, John Zorn, John Lurie, Ástor Piazzolla, Alfred Schnittke, and Samuel Barber. Listed at #11 in the Los Angeles Times Classical Top 25 of 1989.
1989	Steve Reich: Different Trains/Electric Counterpoint: Released: March 3, 1989; Label: Nonesuch (#79176); Format: LP, CD, MP3	Two Steve Reich compositions. Kronos Quartet play tracks 1–3 (Different Trains); Pat Metheny (guitar) plays tracks 4–6 (Electric Counterpoint). Different Trains written for the quartet. Listed at #16 in the Los Angeles Times Classical Top 25 of 1989. Reich won the Grammy for Best Contemporary Composition, with Kronos Quartet as performing artist.
1989	Kronos Quartet Plays Terry Riley: Salome Dances for Peace: Released: October 27, 1989; Label: Nonesuch (#79127); Format: 2LP, 2CD, MP3	Collaboration between the composer and the quartet, nominated for a Grammy.
1990	Black Angels: Released: June 29, 1990; Label: Nonesuch (#79242); Format: LP, CD, MP3	Includes George Crumb's Black Angels, the inspiration for David Harrington to found the Kronos Quartet.
1991	Witold Lutosławski: String Quartet: Released: January 25, 1991; Label: Nonesuch (#79255); Format: CD single, MP3	Compositions by Witold Lutosławski. "Integrates notated music with chance performance."
1991	Kevin Volans: Hunting:Gathering: Released: January 27, 1991; Label: Nonesuch (#79253); Format: CD single, MP3	Composition by South-African composer Kevin Volans, commissioned by the quartet.
1991	Five Tango Sensations: Released: January 25, 1991; Label: Nonesuch (#79254); Format: CD, MP3	Written for the quartet by Ástor Piazzolla (bandoneón). Piazzolla's last studio recording.
1991	Henryk Mikolaj Górecki: Already It Is Dusk/"Lerchenmusik": Released: May 28, 1991; Label: Nonesuch (#79257); Format: CD	Two compositions by Polish composer Henryk Mikolaj Górecki. "Already It Is Dusk" (String Quartet No. 1, Op. 62, 1988) played by Kronos Quartet; "Lerchenmusik" (Recitatives & Ariosos, Op. 53, for Clarinet, Cello, and Piano, 1984) by the London Sinfonietta.
1991	Music of Claude Ballif: Released: 1991; Label: Adda MFA 581283; Format: CD	Quatuor a cordes No. 3
1992	Pieces of Africa: Released: February 21, 1992; Label: Nonesuch (#79275); Format: CD, MP3	Music written for the quartet by seven African composers. Reached #1 in Billboard's "Top World Albums", and spent 29 weeks on the chart.
1993	Short Stories: Released: March 5, 1993; Label: Nonesuch (#79310); Format: CD, MP3	With Steven Mackey (guitar), Pran Nath (voice), Krishma Bhatt (tabla), Terry Riley, and John Constant (tamboura).
1993	Henryk Górecki: String Quartets Nos. 1 and 2: Released: June 25, 1993; Label: Nonesuch (#79319); Format: CD, MP3	Two string quartets "rooted in Polish folk song."
1993	At the Grave of Richard Wagner: Released: September 24, 1993; Label: Nonesuch (#79318); Format: CD, MP3	Works by Alban Berg and Anton Webern. With Aki Takahashi (piano) and Marcella DeCray (harp).
1993	Morton Feldman: Piano and String Quartet: Released: September 24, 1993; Label: Nonesuch (#79320); Format: CD, MP3	One of Morton Feldman's final works, recorded with pianist Aki Takahashi.
1993	Bob Ostertag: All the Rage: Released: October 22, 1993; Label: Nonesuch (#79332); Format: CD single, MP3	Composition by Bob Ostertag, condemning California governor Pete Wilson's veto of pro-gay legislation in 1991; proceeds for AIDS research.
1994	Night Prayers: Released: September 2, 1994; Label: Nonesuch (#79346); Format: CD, MP3	Composers of Eastern Europe and Central Asia. With Throat Singers of Tuva, Dawn Upshaw (soprano), Djivan Gasparian (duduk), and Mikhail Alexandrovich (cantor).
1995	Kronos Quartet Performs Philip Glass: Released: February 3, 1995; Label: Nonesuch (#79356); Format: CD, MP3	"An ideal combination of composer and performers." Reached #9 in Billboard's "Top Classical Albums," and spent 12 weeks on the "Billboard Classical 50" chart.
1996	Howl, USA: Released: May 31, 1996; Label: Nonesuch (#79372); Format: CD, MP3	Allen Ginsberg's poem Howl set to music, and other Cold War pieces. With the voices of Allen Ginsberg, J. Edgar Hoover, and I.F. Stone.
1997	Osvaldo Golijov: The Dreams and Prayers of Isaac the Blind: Released: March 14, 1997; Label: Nonesuch (#79444); Format: CD, MP3	Collaboration with Argentina-born Osvaldo Golijov. With David Krakauer (clarinet).
1997	Tan Dun: Ghost Opera: Released: March 14, 1997; Label: Nonesuch (#79445); Format: CD, MP3	Composition for strings and pipa by Tan Dun, performed by Kronos Quartet and Wu Man.
1997	Early Music (Lachrymæ Antiquæ): Released: September 12, 1997; Label: Nonesuch (#79457); Format: CD, MP3	21 compositions, from the 9th to the 20th century. Critic's Choice in The New York Times.
1998	Kronos Quartet Performs Alfred Schnittke: The Complete String Quartets: Released: May 15, 1998; Label: Nonesuch (#79500); Format: 2CD, MP3	"Kronos can play like demons."
1998	John Adams: John's Book of Alleged Dances: Released: April 21, 1998; Label: Nonesuch (#79465); Format: CD, MP3	Besides John's Book of Alleged Dances, also contains John Adams' Gnarly Buttons by the London Sinfonietta.
2000	Caravan: Released: April 7, 2000; Label: Nonesuch (#79490); Format: CD, MP3	With Zakir Hussain, Taraf de Haïdouks, Kayhan Kalhor, Ziya Tabbassian, Ali Jihad Racy, Souhail Kaspar, and Martyn Jones. Music by ten different composers incl. Carlos Paredes. Reached #4 in Billboard's "Top Classical Albums" and stayed on the chart for 15 weeks.
2001	Terry Riley: Requiem for Adam: Released: September 4, 2001; Label: Nonesuch (#79639); Format: CD, MP3	Written by Terry Riley in memory of Adam Harrington, David Harrington's son. Also includes "The Philosopher's Hand", piano improvisation by Riley.
2001	Steve Reich: Triple Quartet: Released: October 16, 2001; Label: Nonesuch (#79546); Format: CD, MP3	With Dominic Frasca (guitar), Alan Pierson, and the Ossia ensemble (Eastman School of Music).
2002	Nuevo: Released: April 9, 2002; Label: Nonesuch (#79649); Format: CD, MP3	Music by Mexican composers: "A full-throttled celebration of the multitextured sounds of Mexico." Reached #8 in Billboard's "Top Classical Crossover Albums" and stayed on the chart for 14 weeks.
2003	Pēteris Vasks: String Quartet No. 4: Released: August 19, 2003; Label: Nonesuch (#79695); Format: CD single, MP3	Written by Latvian composer Pēteris Vasks for the quartet; achieves "both feverish intensity and active rumination as the piece requires."
2003	Alban Berg: Lyric Suite: Released: August 19, 2003; Label: Nonesuch (#79696); Format: CD single, MP3	Complete recording of Alban Berg's Lyric Suite. Grammy winner for Best Chamber Music Performance, 2004; proves "that the quartet is indeed the 'real thing,' an excellent, multifaceted classical ensemble." With restored setting of Baudelaire's poem "De profundis clamavi", sung by Dawn Upshaw, soprano.
2003	Harry Partch: U.S. Highball: Released: August 19, 2003; Label: Nonesuch (#79697); Format: CD single, MP3	Ben Johnston's arrangement of Harry Partch's recollections. "Performed with pitch-perfect spirit."
2005	Mugam Sayagi: Music of Franghiz Ali-Zadeh: Released: January 11, 2005; Label: Nonesuch (#79804); Format: CD, MP3	Four works by the Azerbaijani composer Franghiz Ali-Zadeh, three of which ("Oasis" (1998), "Apsheron Quintet" (2001), and "Mugam Sayagi" (1993)) commissioned by the Quartet. Fourth track is Ali-Zadeh's "Music for Piano", which is performed by the composer, who also plays piano on "Apsheron Quintet." Reached #14 in Billboard's "Top Classical Albums."
2005	You've Stolen My Heart: Songs From R.D. Burman's Bollywood with Asha Bhosle: Released: August 23, 2005; Label: Nonesuch (#79856); Format: CD, MP3	Recorded with Bollywood playback singer Asha Bhosle; tribute to Rahul Dev Burman., nominated for 46th Grammy Awards for Best Contemporary World Music Album.
2007	Henryk Górecki: String Quartet No. 3 ('...songs are sung'): Released: March 20, 2007; Label: Nonesuch (#79993); Format: CD, MP3	"Editor's Choice" for Strings magazine: "a solemn, spiritual, and revolutionary work." Entered at #6 in Billboard's "Top Classical Albums" on March 30, 2007.
2007	Kronos Quartet Plays Sigur Rós: Released: September 4, 2007; Label: Nonesuch (#307452); Format: MP3	Two "audience favorites": "Flugufrelsarinn" (by Sigur Rós) and "The Star-Spangled Banner" (trad., arr. S. Prutsman after Jimi Hendrix).
2008	Terry Riley: The Cusp of Magic: Released: February 4, 2008; Label: Nonesuch (#360508); Format: CD, MP3	*Written for the quartet, with Wu Man (pipa). Reached #3 in Billboard's "Top Classical Albums" and stayed on the chart for 10 weeks.
2008	Kronos plays Pelle Gudmundsen-Holmgreen: Released: 2008; Label: Dacapo #6.220548; Format: CD	Concerto Grosso, for string quartet and symphonic ensemble; Moving Still, for baritone and string quartet; String Quartet No. 9, Last Ground, for string quartet and ocean
2009	Floodplain: Released: May 19, 2009; Label: Nonesuch (#518349); Format: CD, MP3	Music written or arranged for the quartet, "from cultures based in areas surrounded by water and prone to catastrophic flooding." Includes long piece by Serbian composer Aleksandra Vrebalov.
2010	Rainbow: Music of Central Asia Vol. 8: Released: 2010; Label: Smithsonian Folkways 40527; Format: CD, MP3	With Alim and Fargana Qasimov (tracks 2–6) and Homayun Sakhi (track 1)
2011	Uniko: Released: February 1, 2011; Label: Ondine (ODE 1185–2); Format: CD, MP3	Features Kronos Quartet, Finnish accordionist Kimmo Pohjonen and Samuli Kosminen (live electronics). Seven-part suite for string quartet, accordion and live electronics composed by Pohjonen and Kosminen.
2012	Music of Vladimir Martynov: Released: 2012; Label: Nonesuch #529776-2; Format: CD	The Beatitudes (1998; rescored for Kronos 2006); Schubert-Quintet (Unfinished) (2009), with special guest, Joan Jeanrenaud; Der Abschied (2006)
2013	Under 30 Project: 1–4: Released: April 24, 2013; Label: Digital only #KR 2013-01	Part of the Kronos' "Under 30 Project", presenting the first four commissions by: Alexandra du Bois (USA), Felipe Pérez Santiago (Mexico), Dan Visconti (USA), and Aviya Kopelman (Israel).
2013	Aheym – Music by Bryce Dessner: Released: November 5, 2013; Label: Anti #87296-2	
2015	Sunrise of the Planetary Dream Collector: Music of Terry Riley: Released: June 23, 2015; Label: Nonesuch #549523	Originally released as part of the 2015 compilation "One Earth, One People, One Love: Kronos Plays Terry Riley".
2015	Tundra Songs: Released: 2015; Label: Centrediscs	Music by Derek Charke. Featuring Tanya Tagaq and Laakkuluk Williamson Bathory.
2016	Pelle Gudmundsen-Holmgreen: Green Ground: Released: 2016; Label: Dacapo #8.226153; Format: CD	Includes: New Ground (String Quartet No. 10 (2011)); No Ground (String Quartet No. 11 (2011)); (Also features Theatre of Voices)
2016	Aleksandra Vrebalov: the Sea Ranch Songs: Released: September 30, 2016; Label: Cantaloupe Music #CA21122	Video and animation by Andrew Lyndon, on bonus DVD.
2017	Folk Songs: Released June 9, 2017; Label: Nonesuch #559151	Featuring Sam Amidon, Olivia Chaney, Rhiannon Giddens, and Natalie Merchant. Originally performed for Nonesuch Records 50th anniversary in 2014.
2017	Ladilikan: Released 2017; Label: World Circuit #wcv093	With Trio Da Kali.
2018	Landfall: Released 2018; Label: Nonesuch #564164	With Laurie Anderson. Winner of the 2019 Grammy Award for Best Small Ensemble Performance.
2018	Clouded Yellow: Released 2018; Label: Cantaloupe Music #CA21140	Compositions by Michael Gordon
2019	Sun Rings: Released 2019; Label: Nonesuch	Compositions by Terry Riley
2019	Long Time Passing: Released 2020; Label: Smithsonian Folkways	Kronos Quartet and Friends Celebrate Pete Seeger
2019	Placeless: Released 2019; Label: Valley Entertainment, Inc.	Arabic compositions accompanied by Mahsa Vahdat
2022	Mỹ Lai: Released 2022; Label: Smithsonian Folkways	composed by Jonathan Berger (music) and Harriet Scott Chessman (libretto) for Kronos Quartet
2023	Songs and Symphoniques: The Music of Moondog: Released 2023; Label: Cantaloupe Music	Compositions by Moondog by Ghost Train Orchestra and Kronos Quartet
2024	Outer Spaceways Incorporated: Released June 21, 2024; Label: Red Hot Records	Compositions by Sun Ra
2025	Witness: Released March 14, 2025; Label: Phenotypic Recordings	Witness features the works of Pulitzer Prize-nominated Armenian-American composer and documentarian Mary Kouyoumdjian
2026	Glorious Mahalia: Released April 3, 2026; Label: Smithsonian Folkways Recordings	Honors the life and enduring impact of iconic gospel singer and activist Mahalia Jackson, highlighting her influential role in the civil rights movement.

== Compilation albums ==
Year	Album details	Notes
1995	Released: 1985–1995: Released: October 20, 1995; Label: Nonesuch (#79394); Format: CD, MP3	2-disc set.
1998	Kronos Quartet: 25 Years: Released: October 16, 1998; Label: Nonesuch (#79504); Format: CD, MP3	10-CD box set retrospective. Recorded "with virtuosity, vigor, and astonishing stylistic dexterity."
2014	Kronos Explorer Series: Released: April 8, 2014; Label: Nonesuch #536951	5-CD box of five previously released albums from five different parts of the world: Pieces of Africa, Night Prayers, Caravan, Nuevo, and Floodplain. Includes interview with David Harrington by author Jonathan Cott.
2014	A Thousand Thoughts: Released: 2014; Label: Nonesuch #536952-2	Featuring Asha Bhosle, Zakir Hussain, Tony MacMahon, Le Mystère des Voix Bulgares, Astor Piazzolla, Homayun Sakhi, Vân-Ánh Vanessa Võ, Don Walser, Wu Man.
2015	One Earth, One People, One Love: Kronos Plays Terry Riley: Released June 23, 2015; Label: Nonesuch #548925	5-CD box of four albums in honor of American composer Terry Riley's 80th birthday. Includes three albums previously released by Nonesuch and a new record, "Sunrise of the Planetary Dream Collector".

== Video albums ==
Year	Video details	Notes
2000	In Accord: Released: September 5, 2000; Label: Image Entertainment; Format: DVD	Filmed in 1998; contains pieces by John Zorn, Pérotin, and Alfred Schnittke, as well as Jimi Hendrix's "Purple Haze."
2002	Kronos on Stage: Released: September 5, 2000; Label: Image Entertainment; Format: DVD	Contains Black Angels and Ghost Opera.
2007	Polish Quartets (Kwartety polskie): Released: 2007; Label: Polskie Wydawnictwo Audiowizualne; Format: DVD	Filmed November 11, 2006 in Kraków.; Contains quartets by Witold Lutosławski, Paweł Mykietyn, Krzysztof Penderecki, Henryk Górecki

== Soundtracks ==
Year	Soundtrack details	Notes
1985	Mishima: A Life in Four Chapters: Released: December 11, 1985; Label: Nonesuch (#79113); Format: CD, MP3, Vinyl	Soundtrack by Philip Glass.
1999	Dracula: Released: August 27, 1999; Label: Nonesuch (#97542); Format: CD, MP3	Soundtrack by Philip Glass.
2000	Requiem for a Dream: Released: September 29, 2000; Label: Nonesuch (#79611); Format: CD, MP3	Soundtrack by Clint Mansell.
2002	Spider: Released: December 30, 2002; Label: Virgin France; Format: CD	Soundtrack by Howard Shore.
2006	The Fountain: Released: November 27, 2006; Label: Nonesuch (#79901); Format: CD, MP3	Soundtrack by Clint Mansell.
2009	2081: Released: forthcoming; Label: Nonesuch; Format: CD, MP3	Soundtrack by Lee Brooks for short film based on Kurt Vonnegut's short story "Harrison Bergeron."
2014	Noah: Music from the Motion Picture	Soundtrack by Clint Mansell
2015	Beyond Zero: 1914–1918	A film by Bill Morrison. Soundtrack by Aleksandra Vrebalov.

== Contributions ==
Year	Album details	Notes
1984	Dahl, Ivey, Kingman: Released: 1984; Label: Grenadilla GSC 1066; Format: Cassette tape	Kronos plays Daniel Kingman: String Quartet No. 2, "Joyful"
1985	John Anthony Lennon/Sheila Silver: Released: 1985; Label: Composers Recordings, Inc. (CRI) SD 520; Format: LP; later CD	John Anthony Lennon: Voices for string quartet (also a work by Sheila Silver)
1986	Philip Glass, Songs from Liquid Days: Released: 1986; Label: Format: CD	Kronos plays "Freezing" and "Forgetting." Vocals by Linda Ronstadt (both tracks), backing vocals by The Roches ("Forgetting").
1987	John Zorn, Spillane: Released: 1987; Label: Elecktra/Nonesuch; Format: LP & CD	Kronos plays "Forbidden Fruit" with Christian Marclay on turntables and vocals by Ohta Miromi with original texts by Reck.
1990	Rubáiyát: Elektra's 40th Anniversary: Released: 1990; Label: Elektra; Format: CD	Kronos plays "Marquee Moon", originally performed by Television
1993	Chance Operation: The John Cage Tribute: Released: 1993; Label: Format: CD	Tribute to John Cage; Kronos plays "Thirty Pieces for String Quartet Excerpt."
1995	In C: 25th Anniversary Concert: Released: February 9, 1995; Label: New Albion NA 071; Format: CD	Music by Terry Riley.
1995	Joan Armatrading, What's Inside: Released: October 10, 1995; Label: Format: CD	Kronos plays on "Shapes and Sizes."
1995	Heat: Released: December 19, 1995; Label: Format: CD	Soundtrack by Elliot Goldenthal; other artists include Einstürzende Neubauten, Moby, and Brian Eno; Kronos plays "Heat", "Refinery Surveillance", "Predator Diorama."
1996	David Grisman Quintet, DGQ-20: Released: July 16, 1996; Label: Format: CD	Kronos plays on "Mondo Mando."
1998	Dave Matthews Band, Before These Crowded Streets: Released: April 28, 1998; Label: Format: CD	Kronos plays on "Halloween" and "The Stone."
1999	Jay Cloidt, Kole Kat Krush: Released: 1999; Label: Format: CD	Kronos plays on "Kole Kat Krush."
1999	Café Tacuba, Reves/Yosoy: Released: July 20, 1999; Label: Format: 2CD	Kronos plays "M.C." on the "Reves" disc of the double album, a cover of "La Muerte Chiquita" from the "Yosoy" disc.
2000	Andy Summers, Peggy's Blue Skylight: Released: September 26, 2000; Label: Format: 2CD	Tribute to Charles Mingus; Kronos plays on "Myself When I Am Real."
2001	Osvaldo Golijov, The Man Who Cried: Released: May 22, 2001; Label: Format: CD	Kronos plays "Close Your Eyes (instrumental)", "Ceasar's Song", "Without A Word", "Close Your Eyes (vocal)." Other tracks by Salvatore Licitra, Taraf de Haïdouks, and others.
2001	Ingram Marshall, Kingdom Come: Released: July 17, 2001; Label: Format: CD	Kronos plays "Fog Tropes II for String Quartet and Tape", originally written for brass sextet and rearranged for Kronos Quartet.
2002	Big Bad Love (soundtrack): Released: February 19, 2002; Label: Format: CD	Kronos Quartet plays "Spiritual" (with Tom Verlaine); "a once-in-a-lifetime teaming of guitarist Tom Verlaine with the Kronos Quartet."
2003	Wesla Whitfield, September Songs: The Music of Wilder, Weill and Warren: Released: May 13, 2003; Label: Format: CD	
2003	Tiger Lillies, The Gorey End: Released: September 16, 2003; Label: Format: CD	Kronos contribute to 9 of the 13 songs inspired by Edward Gorey.
2003	Bird Up: The Charlie Parker Remix Project: Released: October 21, 2003; Label: Format: CD	
2003	Nelly Furtado, Folklore: Released: November 25, 2003; Label: Format: CD	Kronos plays on "One-Trick Pony."
2003	The Company (soundtrack): Released: December 9, 2003; Label: Format: CD	Kronos plays "an eerie Kronos Quartet version of "My Funny Valentine."
2003	Gustavo Santaolalla, 21 Grams (soundtrack): Released: December 9, 2003; Label: Format: CD	Kronos plays "When Our Wings Are Cut, Can We Still Fly."
2004	Rokia Traoré, Bowmboï: Released: August 31, 2004; Label: Format: CD	Kronos plays "Manian", "Bowmboï."
2006	Dan Zanes, Catch that Train: Released: May 16, 2006; Label: Festival Five Records #009; Format: CD	Kronos plays on "Grey Goose."
2006	Matmos, The Rose Has Teeth in the Mouth of a Beast: Released: May 9, 2006; Label: Format: CD	Kronos plays "Solo Buttons for Joe Meek."
2007	Healing the Divide: A Concert for Peace and Reconciliation: Released: July 8, 2007; Label: Format: CD	Kronos plays on "Way Down in the Hole", "God's Away on Business", "Lost In The Harbor", and "Diamond In Your Mind", four songs with Tom Waits (vocals) and Greg Cohen (bass). "Thanks to Waits' complex sense of the human condition, these are among Kronos' most powerful, satisfying performances. Highly recommended."
2007	Osvaldo Golijov, Oceana: Released: July 10, 2007; Label: Format: CD	Kronos plays "Tenebrae 1", "Tenebrae 2." "This is Kronos far afield from pop flirtations, spiritually resplendent and leaving you wanting more at the same time."
2007	Nine Inch Nails, Year Zero Remixed: Released: December 20, 2007; Label: Format: CD	Kronos plays "Another Version of the Truth" with Enrique Gonzalez Müller.
2008	Philip Glass, Glass Box: A Nonesuch Retrospective: Released: September 30, 2008; Label: Nonesuch; Format: CD	10-CD collection of the work of Philip Glass on Nonesuch.
2008	Kronos Quartet, Danish National Symphony Orchestra, Kronos plays Holmgreen: Released: October 28, 2008; Label: Format: CD	Kronos plays "Concerto Grosso" with Danish National Symphony Orchestra, conducted by Thomas Dausgaard.
2009	Dark Was the Night: Released: February 16, 2009; Label: 4AD; Format: CD	A 2 disc compilation benefiting the Red Hot Organization, a charity fighting HIV and AIDS. Kronos contributes the title track, a cover of a Blind Willie Johnson song.
2011	Hazmat Modine, Cicada: Released: May 17, 2011; Label: Barbès Records; Format: CD	Kronos plays "Dead Crow".
2012	Michael Hearst, Songs for Unusual Creatures: Released: May 8, 2012; Label: Urban Geek Records; Format: CD	Kronos plays "Aye-aye", and "Weddell Seal".
2014	The Great Beauty: Released: February 19, 2014; Label: Decca International; Format: CD	Kronos plays "The Beatitudes".
2016	Darmstadt Aural Documents · Box 3 · Ensembles: Released: March 14, 2016; Label: Neos NEOS 11230; Format: CD	Kronos plays John Cage: "Thirty Pieces for String Quartet" (1982) (World premiere · Recording: July 27, 1984 – Darmstadt, Orangerie)
2017	Michael Salvatori, Destiny 2 Original Soundtrack: Released: September 5, 2017; Label: Bungie Music Publishing; Format: Digital	Kronos plays "Lost Light", and "Journey".

== Published music ==
- Kronos Collection, Vol. 1. Boosey and Hawkes. 2007.

== Bibliography ==
- Parker, Mara (2005). String quartets: a research and information guide. Routledge. p. 318. ISBN 978-0-415-94176-1.
- Richardson, Derk (January 1999). "Portrait of a Quartet: The Kronos reaps the rewards of 25 years of not fitting the mold". Strings. 13 (5). String Letter Publishing: 49–57.
- Wynn, Ron. "Kronos Quartet", in Woodstra, Chris; Gerald Brennan; Allen Schrott (2005). All music guide to classical music. Hal Leonard Corporation. p. 709. ISBN 978-0-87930-865-0.
