= Ken Hunt (music journalist) =

British music writer (born 1951)

Ken Hunt (born 11 April 1951) is an English music critic, journalist, broadcaster and translator who specialises in world music, folk and improvised musics. He has written for Mojo, Q, The History of Rock and AllMusic, has contributed to titles in Rough Guides' Music Reference Series, and is a musical consultant on the Oxford Dictionary of National Biography. He is also an obituarist for The Guardian, The Independent, The Scotsman, The Sydney Morning Herald and The Times.

An authority on Indian classical music, Hunt has helped compile albums by Ravi Shankar, Lata Mangeshkar and Asha Bhosle. He has written liner notes for albums by many other artists, including Ali Akbar Khan, Shivkumar Sharma, Hariprasad Chaurasia, Yehudi Menuhin, Bert Jansch, Davy Graham and the Kronos Quartet. Ravi Shankar once described Hunt as "unique" in his understanding of the music of the Indian subcontinent.

== Career ==
Hunt was born in Surrey in the south of England in April 1951. His father was a jazz saxophonist and clarinettist. During his youth, Hunt was regularly exposed to the music of artists such as Ella Fitzgerald, Billie Holiday and Artie Shaw. His first published writing appeared in 1967, after which he moved to West Germany and worked for magazines published by the company Gruner + Jahr.

After returning to England, in 1975, he began writing music criticism. He wrote for several underground music publications that furthered the alternative style introduced by ZigZag magazine, including Dark Star and Omaha Rainbow. From 1979 to 1989, Hunt was the editor and publisher of Swing 51, a magazine dedicated to "folk, bluegrass and beyond". During that time he interviewed and profiled Paul Brady, Anne Briggs, Martin Carthy, Jerry Garcia, Alan Garner, Mickey Hart, Dagmar Krause, David Lindley, Christy Moore, Ralph Steadman and Robin Williamson, among others. In the 1980s, he also contributed reviews to the magazines Folk Roots and Folk International.

Hunt was a contributor to The Penguin Encyclopedia of Popular Music, which was edited by Donald Clarke and published in 1989, with a revised edition following in 1998. He also wrote extensively for Rough Guides' book World Music, first published in 2000. For the third edition of this title, in 2009, Hunt supplied seven chapters on India and one each on Bangladesh and Germany. Between 1996 and 2010, he served as the compiler for many of Rough Guides' CD releases, issued on the World Music Network label, and for releases by Ravi Shankar.

Coinciding with the 50th anniversary of Indian and Pakistani independence in 1997, Hunt organised a representative musical programme for the Tanz&FolkFest Rudolstadt festival in Germany. During this period, he also reviewed non-Western classical releases for Gramophone magazine. Since 2000, Hunt has been a writer and consultant for the Oxford Dictionary of National Biography, having contributed to both its Millennium edition and the project's ongoing supplements.

Hunt's connections with the Kronos Quartet began in the early 1980s. He wrote the CD notes for their albums Kevin Volans: Hunting:Gathering, Five Tango Sensations, Pieces of Africa and Caravan. He was instrumental in conceiving and bringing to violinist David Harrington a project related to the music of Bollywood and Bengali film composer R.D. Burman; already knowing Asha Bhosle through Ali Akbar Khan, Hunt brought Harrington and Bhosle together for the Kronos Quartet's 2005 album You've Stolen My Heart, which received a Grammy nomination.

He has also collaborated, as a lyricist, with the Czech avant-garde singer and composer Iva Bittová. Hunt runs the website World Music with Petr Dorůžka, a Czech journalist and broadcaster, who is also the son of Czechoslovakia's foremost jazz critic and musicologist, Lubomír Dorůžka.

Hunt was one of the contributors to the 2012 book The Album: A Guide to Pop Music's Most Provocative, Influential, and Important Creations, edited by James E. Perone. As of 2015, he continued to write for international music and other publications such as fRoots, Folker, Jazzwise, Penguin Eggs, the UK-based Indian arts magazine Pulse, Sing Out!, R2 and Times Literary Supplement, in addition to several UK newspapers.
