= Dracula (album) =

Soundtrack album by Kronos Quartet
- Released: 27 August 1999
- Recorded: August 1998
- Genre: Contemporary classical
- Label: Nonesuch Records (#79542)
- Producers: Judith Sherman, Michael Riesman, Kurt Munkacsi

Kronos Quartet chronology
John Adams: John's Book of Alleged Dances (1999)	Dracula (1999)	Caravan (2000)

Dracula is a soundtrack performed by the Kronos Quartet, with music composed by Philip Glass, for the 1931 film Dracula.

== Genesis and performance ==
The movie (directed by Tod Browning and starring Bela Lugosi) could be shown to audiences both as a silent movie and as a talkie, though conversation was limited to basic narrative elements. Unusually, it did not have a specific score and only two pieces of music on its soundtrack: Tchaikovsky's Swan Lake during the opening credits, and the overture of Wagner's Die Meistersinger von Nürnberg during a scene at an opera.

Glass was commissioned to write the score by Universal Studios Home Entertainment, which released the movie with the Glass-soundtrack on VHS and DVD in 1999. According to Glass, the choice of chamber music played by a string quartet rather than an orchestral score followed from the movie's setting, "libraries and drawing rooms and gardens."

Kronos and Glass (on piano) performed the score during viewings of the movie across the United States in 1999 and 2000 to promote the album. Other promotion efforts by Universal, which was trying to "reinvigorate and re-market" their Classical Monsters catalog, included discounts for buyers of multiple CDs, and a trailer for the movie on copies of the video release of The Mummy.

== Philip Glass and the Kronos Quartet ==
Glass and the Quartet have collaborated on a number of albums. Kronos first recorded a Glass composition on the 1985 soundtrack Mishima: A Life in Four Chapters. In 1986, they contributed two tracks to his Songs from Liquid Days. In that same year they recorded a composition of his for their 1986 album Kronos Quartet, their first album on Nonesuch Records, which also releases Glass's music. In 1993, they recorded Kronos Quartet Performs Philip Glass, containing his String Quartets nos. 2, 4, and 5; the latter is the first piece Glass wrote specifically for Kronos. A number of compositions played by Kronos are found on the Philip Glass 10-CD collection Glass Box: A Nonesuch Retrospective, released in 2008.

== Critical reception ==
Professional ratings
Review scores
Source	Rating
Allmusic	3/5 stars

The soundtrack and the performances thereof have received mixed reviews. Entertainment Weekly was very positive, praising the "hypnotic new score," while The Essential Monster Movie Guide calls the score "unnecessary," and a Lugosi-biography calls it "ill-considered."

Negative reviews abounded: Allan Kozinn of The New York Times remarked that "the project seems not to have inspired Mr. Glass....Heard alone on CD it is harmless enough, but coupled with the film it does more harm than good." The San Francisco Chronicle said, in anticipation of a performance with the composer on piano, "after previewing CD and video, it is painfully evident that this composer and this film are mismatched." It continued, "Glass' constant score simply sounds busy, its gloomy arpeggios merely getting in the way. The few chords that accompany moments of shock verge on the cheesy....the Glass music seems to suck away the film's life blood. Who's the vampire now?" Likewise negative, but this time after a live performance of the movie and music at Royce Hall, on the UCLA campus, was Kenneth Turan of the Los Angeles Times: "As a public event, however, the Royce concert, performed by Glass and the Kronos Quartet and conducted by Michael Riesman, was a distinct disappointment."

Others were more positive. Roger Ebert praised the score, writing: "The Glass score is effective in the way it suggests not just moody creepiness, but the urgency and need behind Dracula's vampirism. It evokes a blood-thirst that is 500 years old." Self-proclaimed "film purists" Bill Hunt and Todd Doogan called the soundtrack "quite cool" and commented that it "fits the film perfectly." After commenting on what he called the low artistic quality of the film, Philip Kennicott of The Washington Post said: "The delightful thing about Glass's music for film is that there's no need for it. It is a pure artistic addition to something that was not wanting in the first place; and in that act, Glass confirms a kind of reverence for the original. It is, artistically if not financially, an act of selfless collaboration with a partner—the film—that might be considered the culturally undead." Bradley Bambarger, in Billboard, praised the soundtrack as "one of Glass' most lyrical, moving works, regardless of genre." Mark Allender's review on Allmusic likewise ranks the soundtrack very high in Glass's oeuvre:

The music is absolutely beautiful, augmented by the raw, woody sounds of the Kronos Quartet. No refined or reverbed string sounds here; you hear the naked, scratchy sound of a bow on a string all the way through, playing in the interwoven arpeggiated style that is unmistakably Glass. Complex chord structures and dense rhythms permeate the record, making it musically satisfying for both the pedestrian and the sophisticate ear. This will certainly stand out as one of the premiere works in Glass' soundtrack portfolio.

== Track listing ==
All music is composed by Philip Glass.

No.	Title	Length
1.	"Dracula"	1:12
2.	"Journey to the Inn"	0:43
3.	"The Inn"	1:16
4.	"The Crypt"	1:16
5.	"Carriage Without a Driver"	2:11
6.	"The Castle"	3:10
7.	"The Drawing Room"	1:06
8.	"'Excellent, Mr. Renfield'"	2:46
9.	"The Three Consorts of Dracula"	1:30
10.	"The Storm"	1:29
11.	"Horrible Tragedy"	1:22
12.	"London Fog"	1:15
13.	"In the Theatre"	2:48
14.	"Lucy's Bitten"	2:18
15.	"Seward Sanatorium"	2:57
16.	"Renfield"	2:57
17.	"In His Cell"	1:31
18.	"When the Dream Comes"	2:07
19.	"Dracula Enters"	3:59
20.	"Or a Wolf"	4:38
21.	"Women in White"	3:07
22.	"Renfield in the Drawing Room"	3:26
23.	"Dr. van Helsing and Dracula"	3:26
24.	"Mina on the Terrace"	4:42
25.	"Mina's Bedroom/The Abbey"	3:53
26.	"The End of Dracula"	4:06

== Releases and format ==
Alternate cover.

The album was released by Nonesuch with two different covers. One was black with the name "DRACULA" in a panel with an ornamented border; the version currently available has a colored drawing of Count Dracula resembling the movie poster. Unlike most other Kronos releases on Nonesuch, this album does not come as an MP3 download. The soundtrack was included in a 5-CD compilation of Philip Glass soundtracks, released in 2001 (Nonesuch 79660).

== Credits ==
=== Musicians ===
- David Harrington – violin
- John Sherba – violin
- Hank Dutt – viola
- Joan Jeanrenaud – cello

=== Production ===
- Recorded at Skywalker Sound, Nicasio, California
  - Bob Levy – engineer

== See also ==
- List of 1999 albums
