= Terry Riley: The Cusp of Magic =

Studio album by Kronos Quartet
- Released: 4 February 2008
- Genre: Contemporary classical
- Label: Nonesuch #360508
- Producer: Judith Sherman

Kronos Quartet chronology
Kronos Quartet Plays Sigur Rós (2007)	Terry Riley: The Cusp of Magic (2008)	Floodplain (2009)

Terry Riley: The Cusp of Magic is a studio album by the Kronos Quartet and Wu Man, an album-length recording of a collaboration between the quartet and American composer Terry Riley.

== Terry Riley and the Kronos Quartet ==
Terry Riley and the Kronos Quartet have been collaborating since 1978, when Riley taught composition, improvisation, and Hindustani classical music at Mills College in Oakland, California, and the quartet were artists in residence. Both parties benefitted from the exchange. In the words of Joan Jeanrenaud (Kronos cellist until 1998), "Terry shaped how Kronos shaped the music we played"; the Kronos Quartet, in turn, helped Riley "to move beyond the minimalism of his early period," an observation made also by K. Robert Schwarz in a long piece in The New York Times on the occasion of an overview of the composer's career: "By 1984, when he completed Cadenza on the Night Plain, he had turned his back on the Minimalism of In C, instead exploring sonic realms stretching from the long-breathed lyricism of North India to the spiky, fragmented development of Bartok."

Riley has composed many works for the quartet, starting in 1985 with Terry Riley: Cadenza on the Night Plain, the four 1986 compositions released in 1989 on the double-CD Salome Dances for Peace and the compositions on the 2001 album Terry Riley: Requiem for Adam.

== Track listing ==
All music is composed by Terry Riley, except as noted.

No.	Title	Length
1.	"I. The Cusp of Magic"	10:02
2.	"II. Buddha's Bedroom"	10:28
3.	"III. The Nursery"	5:03
4.	"IV. Royal Wedding"	6:07
5.	"V. Emily and Alice"	4:05
6.	"VI. Prayer Circle"	6:39
7.	"Tusen Tankar" (trad. Scandinavian, download bonus)	6:51

=== Notes ===
1. Track 7 is a bonus download on iTunes and, in MP3 format, from the Nonesuch website.

== Credits ==
=== Musicians ===
- David Harrington – violin
- John Sherba – violin
- Hank Dutt – viola
- Jeffrey Zeigler – cello
- Wu Man – pipa

=== Production ===
- Recorded 7–12 August 2006 at Skywalker Sound, Nicasio, California, mastered by Bob Ludwig at Gateway Mastering & DVD
  - Scott Fraser – engineer
  - Dann Thompson – assistant engineer
  - David Dvorin – electronic music, compiled and mixed

== See also ==
- List of 2007 albums
