= Rainbow: Music of Central Asia Vol. 8 =

Studio album by Kronos Quartet
- Released: 2010
- Recorded: September 2008–March 2009
- Genres: Contemporary classical, mugham, ashiq
- Label: Smithsonian Folkways (#40527)
- Producers: David Harrington, Theodore Levin, Fairouz R. Nishanova

Kronos Quartet chronology
Floodplain (2009)	Rainbow: Music of Central Asia Vol. 8 (2010)	Uniko (2011)

Rainbow: Music of Central Asia Vol. 8 is an album by the Kronos Quartet, in collaboration with Alim & Fargana Qasimov and Homayun Sakhi. The album is released by Folkways Records as a co-production between the Smithsonian Institution and the Aga Khan Music Initiative in Central Asia.

== Track listing ==
No.	Title	Length
1.	"Rangin Kaman" (Homayun Sakhi)	28:58
2.	"Köhlen Atim" (Alim Qasimov)	7:45
3.	"Mehriban Olaq" (Alim Qasimov)	4:49
4.	"Getme, Getme" (Alim Qasimov)	12:31
5.	"Leyla" (Alim Qasimov)	1:43
6.	"Qashlarin Kamandir" (Alim Qasimov)	9:45

== Credits ==
=== Musicians ===
- David Harrington - violin
- John Sherba - violin
- Hank Dutt - viola
- Jeffrey Zeigler - cello
- Homayun Sakhi - Afghan rubab
- Salar Nader - tabla
- Abbos Kosimov - doyra, qayraq
- Alim Qasimov - vocal (tracks 2–6)
- Farghana Qasimova - vocal, daf (tracks 2–6)
- Rafael Asgarov - balaban (tracks 2–6)
- Rauf Islamov - kamancheh (tracks 2–6)
- Ali Asgar Ammadov - tar (tracks 2–6)
- Vugar Sharifzadeh - naghara (tracks 2–6)

=== Production ===
Track 1 recorded at Skywalker Sound, Lucas Valley, California, March 2009

- Joel Gordon - recording engineer

Tracks 2–6 recorded at Livingston Recording Studios, London, England, September 2008

- Scott Fraser - recording engineer
- Joel Gordon - mastering
- Sebastien Schuytser - photography
- Jay Blakesberg - photography
- Rachel Bleckman - photography
- Aida Huseynova, Anna Oldfield - translation (Azerbeijani lyrics)

== See also ==
- Kronos Quartet discography
