= Steve Reich: Triple Quartet =

Studio album by Kronos Quartet
- Released: 16 October 2001
- Genre: Contemporary classical
- Label: Nonesuch (#79546)
- Producer: Robert Hurwitz

Kronos Quartet chronology
Terry Riley: Requiem for Adam (2001)	Steve Reich: Triple Quartet (2001)	Nuevo (2002)

Professional ratings
Review scores
Source	Rating
Allmusic	4/5 stars

Steve Reich: Triple Quartet is a studio album by the Kronos Quartet and other artists. The music was composed by Steve Reich and was commissioned by the quartet; Reich and the quartet have worked together since 1989.

== Compositions and performers ==
Triple Quartet was composed in 1999 and since then has been in the quartet's live repertoire. It is a three-movement work for three string quartets; on the album, quartets two and three are pre-recorded and the players play the first quartet along with the tape, as they do live.

Besides the Kronos Quartet's version of Triple Quartet, the album contains three other Reich pieces. Electric Guitar Phase, one of Reich's "phase pieces," is played by New York guitar player Dominic Frasca. The composition is an updated version of the 1967 Violin Phase arranged for guitar and tape (or four guitars). Alan Pierson conducts Alarm Will Sound and the Ossia Ensemble from the Eastman School of Music, which perform Reich's 1978 Music for a Large Ensemble. The final track is Mika Yoshida's rendition of Tokyo/Vermont Counterpoint, performed on MIDI marimba.

== Track listing ==
All music is composed by Steve Reich.

No.	Title	Performer(s)	Length
1.	"Triple Quartet: First Movement"	Kronos Quartet	7:10
2.	"Triple Quartet: Second Movement"	Kronos Quartet	4:05
3.	"Triple Quartet: Third Movement"	Kronos Quartet	3:28
4.	"Electric Guitar Phase"	Dominic Frasca, solo guitar	15:11
5.	"Music for a Large Ensemble"	Alarm Will Sound and Ossia Ensemble	15:41
6.	"Tokyo/Vermont Counterpoint"	Mika Yoshida, solo on MIDI marimba	9:05

== Credits ==
=== Musicians ===
- David Harrington – violin
- John Sherba – violin
- Hank Dutt – viola
- Jennifer Culp – cello
- Terry Riley – piano
- Dominic Frasca – electric guitar
- Mika Yoshida – MIDI marimba
- Alan Pierson – vibraphone, conductor of Alarm Will Sound and Ossia Ensemble

=== Production ===
- Triple Quartet recorded March and April 1999, August 2000 at Skywalker Sound, Nicasio, California
  - John Kilgore – engineer
  - Dann Thompson – assistant engineer
  - Bob Levy – assistant engineer
- Electric Guitar Phase recorded January 2001 at DV8 Studios, New York City
  - Dominic Frasca – arranger, producer, engineer
- Music for Large Ensemble recorded May, September 2000 at the Kresge Recording Studios of the Eastman School of Music, Rochester, NY, produced by Alan Pierson, Clay Greenberg, and Rob Haskins
  - Justin Volpe – engineer
- Tokyo/Vermont Counterpoint recorded March 1998 at Toms Studio, Hondo City, Kumamoto, Japan, arranged and produced by Mika Yoshida
  - Hidenori Shimada – engineer

== See also ==
- List of 2001 albums
