= Kronos Quartet Performs Alfred Schnittke: The Complete String Quartets =

Studio album by Kronos Quartet
- Released: 15 May 1998
- Genre: Contemporary classical
- Length: 106:45
- Label: Nonesuch (#79500)
- Producer: Judith Sherman

Kronos Quartet chronology
Tan Dun: Ghost Opera (1997)	Kronos Quartet Performs Alfred Schnittke: The Complete String Quartets (1998)	John Adams: John's Book of Alleged Dances (1998)

Kronos Quartet Performs Alfred Schnittke: The Complete String Quartets is a studio album by the Kronos Quartet. The double CD contains all four of Russian composer Alfred Schnittke's "startling" string quartets. String Quartet No.3 was recorded and released in 1988; the other three were recorded between 1994 and 1996 and released in 1998.

== Track listing ==
All music is composed by Alfred Schnittke.

Disc one: String Quartet No.1 (1966)—tracks 1–4; String Quartet No.2 (1980)—tracks 5–8; String Quartet No.3 (1983)—tracks 9–11
No.	Title	Length
1.	"I. Sonata"	7:32
2.	"II. Canon"	3:30
3.	"III. Cadenza"	5:33
4.	"Canon in Memory of I. Stravinsky (1971)"	5:21
5.	"I. Moderato"	3:12
6.	"II. Agitato"	5:36
7.	"III. Mesto"	6:41
8.	"IV. Moderato"	6:22
9.	"I. Andante"	5:41
10.	"II. Agitato"	5:44
11.	"III. Pesante"	7:37

Disc two: String Quartet No.4 (1989)
No.	Title	Length
1.	"I. Lento"	9:03
2.	"II. Allegro"	7:00
3.	"III. Lento"	5:51
4.	"IV. Vivace"	3:21
5.	"V. Lento"	9:15
6.	"Collected Songs Where Every Verse Is Filled with Grief (1984–85)" (from Concerto for Mixed Choir, arr. Kronos Quartet)	8:13

== Critical reception ==
The music of Alfred Schnittke became very popular in the United States in the 1990s, and the Kronos Quartet were among many "influential international figures" who played his music. They had recorded a Schnittke composition (String Quartet No.3) as early as 1988; all four of Schnittke's string quartets had been on the Kronos repertoire at least since 1991. Critics responded quite positively to this recording of the quartets. Lawrence Johnson, writing for the New York Times, said, "As the new Schnittke survey attests, the Kronos can play like demons. . . . The Kronos Quartet has delivered a performance in which every phrase is filled, if not with grief, with profound and resonant meaning." The album was nominated for Grammy Awards in two categories, "Best Classical Album" and "Best Chamber Music Performance."

== Personnel ==
=== Musicians ===
- David Harrington – violin
- John Sherba – violin
- Hank Dutt – viola
- Joan Jeanrenaud – cello

=== Production ===
- Recorded August 1994 – August 1996 at Skywalker Sound, Nicasio, California
  - Craig Silvey – Engineer
  - Chris Haynes – Assistant engineer (String Quartet No.1, "Canon")
  - Steve Limonoff – Assistant engineer (String Quartet No.2)
  - John Klepko – Assistant engineer (String Quartet No.4)
  - Jeanne Velonis – Editing assistance (String Quartet No.1 and String Quartet No.4, "Canon")
- String Quartet No. 3 recorded November 1987 at Methuen Memorial Music Hall, Methuen, Massachusetts
  - John Newton – Engineer
  - Mastering of original release: Robert C. Ludwig
  - Previously released on Kronos Quartet, Winter Was Hard

== See also ==
- List of 1998 albums
