= Terry Riley: Cadenza on the Night Plain =

Studio album by Kronos Quartet
- Released: 1985
- Recorded: 21–23 October 1984
- Genre: Contemporary classical music
- Length: 74:59
- Label: Gramavision Records
- Producer: Timothy Martyn

Kronos Quartet chronology
Monk Suite: Kronos Quartet Plays Music of Thelonious Monk (1985)	Terry Riley: Cadenza on the Night Plain (1985)	Music of Bill Evans (1986)

Terry Riley: Cadenza on the Night Plain is a studio album by the Kronos Quartet, the first album-length recording of a collaboration between the quartet and American composer Terry Riley.

== Genesis and performance ==
The music on this album was recorded in 1984, and was conceived or adapted in collaboration with the Kronos Quartet. "Sunrise Of The Planetary Dream Collector" and "G-Song" had been composed in 1980 and "Cadenza On The Night Plain" in 1983, and were adapted for the quartet. The cooperation between Riley and the quartet is described as a truly collaborative effort, specifically in the case of Kronos Quartet Plays Terry Riley: Salome Dances for Peace and Cadenza on the Night Plain. According to Riley, "When I write a score for them, it's an unedited score. I put in just a minimal amount of dynamics and phrasing marks. It's essentially a score like Vivaldi would have done. So when we go to rehearsal, we spend a lot of time trying out different ideas in order to shape the music, to form it."

"G-Song" and "Cadenza On The Night Plain" were re-recorded for the quartet's 25-year retrospective collection, Kronos Quartet: 25 Years.

Kronos began playing Cadenza On The Night Plain in 1984, with an early performance in Darmstadt, Germany; it remained on the Kronos playlist for a long time, and was performed as late as 1996.

=== Sunrise of the Planetary Dream Collector ===
The title is derived from Riley's "whimsical notion" of a "collector who came around every day on the planet and collected all dreams so that they could be redistributed the next day." The composition is written in 14-beat modules (in Dorian mode) and allows for a significant amount of improvisation: players are free to choose their own modules.

=== G-song ===
This is the first composition Riley wrote for the Quartet, but it is based on an earlier composition by Riley, a 1973 composition for saxophone and keyboard; the original saxophone melody was transcribed for viola. "G-song" has a jazz chord progression over which is played a 16-bar theme in G-minor.

=== Mythic Birds Waltz ===
Parts of this song come from a larger composition intended for sitar player Krishna Bhatt.

=== Cadenza on the Night Plain ===
"Cadenza" was written in 1984 and first performed by the Quartet in Darmstadt, Germany. The longest work on the album, at 37'10", it contains thirteen separate sections, some with whimsical or humorous titles such as "March of the Old Timers Reefer Division." Riley's interest in spirituality is evident in sections such as "Tuning to Rolling Thunder," inspired by the ideas of Native American medicine man Rolling Thunder.

== Terry Riley and the Kronos Quartet ==
Terry Riley and the Kronos Quartet have been collaborating since 1978, when Riley taught composition, improvisation, and Hindustani classical music at Mills College in Oakland, California, and the quartet were artists in residence. Both parties benefitted from the exchange. In the words of Joan Jeanrenaud (Kronos cellist until 1998), "Terry shaped how Kronos shaped the music we played"; the Kronos Quartet, in turn, helped Riley "to move beyond the minimalism of his early period," an observation made also by K. Robert Schwarz in a long piece in The New York Times on the occasion of an overview of the composer's career: "By 1984, when he completed Cadenza on the Night Plain, he had turned his back on the Minimalism of In C, instead exploring sonic realms stretching from the long-breathed lyricism of North India to the spiky, fragmented development of Bartok."

Riley has composed many works for the quartet, including the four 1986 compositions released in 1989 on the double-CD Salome Dances for Peace and the compositions on the 2001 album Terry Riley: Requiem for Adam.

== Critical reception ==
Critics have responded positively to Cadenza On The Night Plain, as performed and as recorded. Down Beat listed the album as a "Critic's Choice" in November 1985, and in February of the next year John Diliberto reviewed the album for the same magazine. Of a 1984 Carnegie Hall performance, Bernard Holland wrote in The New York Times: "There are many lovely moments in this imaginative piece and one particularly interesting section in which series of rhythmic patterns pass slowly by us, one by one, as if on parade." Kyle Gann, in a review of Kronos Quartet: 25 Years, called Riley's compositions for the quartet "masterpieces," and referred to Cadenza as "the archetypal Kronos piece." Both TIME Magazine and Newsweek placed the album in their top ten of classical albums of the year.

== Track listing ==
All music is composed by Terry Riley.

No.	Title	Length
1.	"Sunrise Of The Planetary Dream Collector"	10:25
2.	"G-Song"	11:11
3.	"Mythic Birds Waltz"	16:13
4.	"Cadenza On The Night Plain"	37:10

== Releases and format ==
Originally released as a double LP in 1985 (Grammavision #7014-1, as compact cassette #7014-2), the album was released again in 1988 (Gramavision 79444). It was re-released as a CD (Gramavision #18-7014-2) on 1 August 1992, on compact cassette (Rhino) on 1 August 1992, and again on CD (Hannibal #1509), on 31 January 2006.

== Personnel ==
=== Musicians ===
- David Harrington – violin
- John Sherba – violin
- Hank Dutt – viola
- Joan Jeanrenaud – cello

=== Production ===
- Recorded 21–23 October 1984 at Gramavision Studios, mastered by Bob Ludwig at Masterdisk
  - Timothy Martyn – producer, engineer
  - Ernst Haas – photography
  - Neal Pozner – design
  - Jonathan F. P. Rose – executive producer
  - Mark Swed – liner notes

== See also ==
- List of 1985 albums
