= Henryk Górecki: String Quartet No. 3 ('...songs are sung') =

Studio album by Kronos Quartet
- Released: 20 March 2007
- Genre: Contemporary classical
- Label: Nonesuch (#79993)
- Producer: Judith Sherman

Kronos Quartet chronology
The Fountain (2006)	Henryk Górecki: String Quartet No. 3 ('...songs are sung') (2007)	Kronos Quartet Plays Sigur Rós (2007)

Henryk Górecki: String Quartet No. 3 ('...songs are sung') is a studio album by the Kronos Quartet, containing the last string quartet by Polish composer Henryk Górecki. The Kronos Quartet had recorded Górecki's other string quartets on Henryk Mikolaj Górecki: Already It Is Dusk/"Lerchenmusik" (1991) and on Henryk Górecki: String Quartets Nos. 1 and 2 (1993).

== Track listing ==
All music is composed by Henryk Górecki.

No.	Title	Length
1.	"I. Adagio-Molto Andante-Cantabile"	10:34
2.	"II. Largo, Cantabile"	10:59
3.	"III. Allegro, Sempre ben marcato"	4:22
4.	"IV. Deciso-Espressivo ma ben tenuto"	11:26
5.	"V. Largo-Tranquillo"	12:36

== Critical reception ==
The album was an "Editor's Choice" for Strings magazine, which called it "a solemn, spiritual, and revolutionary work."

== Credits ==
=== Musicians ===
- David Harrington – violin
- John Sherba – violin
- Hank Dutt – viola
- Jeffrey Zeigler – cello

=== Production ===
- Recorded August 1–3, 2006 at Skywalker Sound, Nicasio, California
  - Leslie Ann Jones – engineer
  - Dann Thompson – assistant engineer
- Robert Hurwitz – executive producer
- Frank Olinsky – art direction, design
- Keith Carter – cover photograph
