= Homayun Sakhi =

Afghan musician

Homayoun Sakhi
- Born: 1976; Kabul
- Instrument: Rabab
- Website: https://homayounsakhi.com

Homayoun Sakhi is an Afghan-born player of the Afghan rubab, with an international base of fans and many global collaborations. Since moving to the United States, he has collaborated with the Kronos Quartet and others.

Sakhi was born in 1976 in Kabul into a family of musicians; he learned to play the rubab from his father. He moved to the United States in 2002 and lives in Fremont, California ("Little Kabul"), where he teaches Afghan music at a children's school he opened.

Sakhi's music is heard on two CDs from Smithsonian Folkways: The Art of the Afghan Rubab: Music of Central Asia Vol. 3 (2006), a solo album, and Rainbow: Music of Central Asia Vol. 8 (2010), a collaboration with the Kronos Quartet and others. He has collaborated with santoor player Rahul Sharma and was a resident at Brandeis University. Dawn Elder brought him together with Afghan singer Mahwash, with whom he formed the group Voices of Afghanistan.

In a 2013 interview with NPR, Sakhi said he practiced between eight and twelve hours every day, inventing new techniques along the way. He plays higher on the neck than others do, and picks the strings in both directions.
