= The History of Rock (magazine) =

British rock music magazine

- Categories: Music magazine
- First issue: 1981
- Final issue: 1984
- Company: Orbis Publishing
- Country: United Kingdom
- Based in: London
- Language: English

The History of Rock was a British rock music magazine that operated in the early 1980s. It was owned by Orbis Publishing, a publisher that specialised in partworks, and ran to ten volumes, comprising 120 parts and 2400 pages. According to the music journalism website Rock's Backpages, the magazine "provided an encyclopaedic look at the history of contemporary music".

Among the articles that appeared in The History of Rock during its first year of operation was a retrospective study of the music and countercultural landscape of 1967, by sociomusicologist Simon Frith; an overview of the guitar's role in rock music, by Charles Shaar Murray; a piece by Nick Tosches on the "devil's music" aspect of Jerry Lee Lewis' work; and an overview of the role of female artists in the 1950s, by John Pidgeon. Other writers and critics who contributed to the magazine between 1981 and 1984 include Chris Welch, Barry Miles, Penny Valentine, Chris Salewicz, Lenny Kaye, Colin Escott, Tom Hibbert, Greg Shaw, John Tobler, Steve Turner, Bob Woffinden and Ken Hunt.

In 2015, the title was adopted by the publishers of Uncut for a new magazine covering key events in rock history by year. This incarnation of The History of Rock reproduces contemporary articles that originally appeared in the music publications Melody Maker and the NME.
