= Terry Riley: Requiem for Adam =

Studio album by Kronos Quartet
- Released: 4 September 2001
- Recorded: April 1999, August 2000
- Genre: contemporary classical
- Length: 47:46
- Label: Nonesuch (#79639)
- Producer: Robert Hurwitz

Kronos Quartet chronology
Caravan (2000)	Terry Riley: Requiem for Adam (2001)	Steve Reich: Triple Quartet (2001)

Terry Riley: Requiem for Adam is a studio album by the Kronos Quartet. The music was composed by Terry Riley, commissioned by the quartet; the album is a requiem for Adam Harrington, the son of Kronos co-founder David Harrington.

== Genesis and composition ==
Adam Harrington, age 16, died of heart failure caused by a blood clot, sustained while hiking with his family on Mount Diablo, a 3,849-foot (1,173 m) mountain in the San Francisco Bay Area, on Easter Sunday, 1995. Riley finished the three-movement composition in 1998, and it was first performed in the Concertgebouw in Amsterdam on 28 June 1999; David Harrington recalls that this performance was "the most powerful in his memory". The requiem has been in the quartet's repertoire ever since.

As Terry Riley explains in the liner notes, the first movement has a rising sequential four-note motif moving upwards, and a series of variations on this pattern, ending with the motive being played in upper-register harmonics. The title of the second movement alludes to the spot where Adam Harrington suffered his accident. An electronic soundtrack of horns and percussion (played by Riley on an Ensoniq TS 12) is the background for the strings, in what Riley calls a "New Orleans Dixieland" kind of funeral march. The third movement is an A-B-C-A-B coda, in which a two-note motif opens and closes the composition, two notes representing the two syllables of Adam's name. The fourth track, "The Philosopher's Hand", is a solo piano improvisation by Riley inspired by the late Pandit Pran Nath; Riley at the time was working on Atlantis Nath, a tribute to the Indian master. Pran Nath had been at Adam's memorial service and taken David Harrington's hand; Harrington remarked later that it was the softest hand he'd ever held.

== Terry Riley and the Kronos Quartet ==
Terry Riley and the Kronos Quartet have been collaborating since 1978, when Riley taught composition, improvisation, and Hindustani classical music at Mills College in Oakland, California, and the quartet were artists in residence. Both parties benefitted from the exchange. In the words of Joan Jeanrenaud (Kronos cellist until 1998), "Terry shaped how Kronos shaped the music we played"; the Kronos Quartet, in turn, helped Riley "to move beyond the minimalism of his early period". Riley has composed many works for the quartet, including "Sunrise of the Planetary Dream Collector", "G-Song", and "Cadenza on the Night Plain", released on Cadenza on the Night Plain (1988); and the four compositions on the 1989 double-CD Salome Dances for Peace.

== Critical reception ==
Professional ratings
Review scores
Source	Rating
Allmusic	(Positive)

Rob Cowan in The Independent called it "humbling but ultimately life-affirming", praising its "silvery harmonics, quiet yet flowing and as unsentimental as late Beethoven", and its "inconsolable glissandos". John von Rhein of the Chicago Tribune assigns it first place in his top-10 of 2001 recordings. Allen Gimbel, reviewing works by Riley in the American Record Guide, says the requiem is "undeniably quirky" but "quite effective and exhibit[ing] a substantial emotional range": "it's hard not to be moved". Peter Lavezzoli says "it has been regarded as the most compelling recording by either Riley or the Kronos Quartet".

== Track listing ==
All music is composed by Terry Riley.

No.	Title	Performer	Length
1.	"Ascending the Heaven Ladder"	Kronos Quartet	13:24
2.	"Cortejo Fúnebre en el Monte Diablo"	Kronos Quartet	7:05
3.	"Requiem for Adam"	Kronos Quartet	21:18
4.	"The Philosopher's Hand"	Terry Riley, solo piano	5:57

== Personnel ==
=== Musicians ===
- David Harrington – violin
- John Sherba – violin
- Hank Dutt – viola
- Jennifer Culp – cello
- Terry Riley – piano

=== Production ===
- "Ascending the Heaven Ladder," "Requiem for Adam," and "The Philosopher's Hand" recorded August 2000 at Skywalker Sound, Nicasio, California
  - Leslie Ann Jones – engineer
  - Dann Thompson – assistant engineer
  - Jeanne Velonis – editing assistant
- "Cortejo Fúnebre en el Monte Diablo" recorded April 1999 at Skywalker Sound
  - Craig Silvey – engineer
  - Bob Levy – assistant engineer

== See also ==
- List of 2001 albums
