= List of Bill Evans tribute albums =

This is a chronological list of Bill Evans tribute albums.

- 1980: Seven Steps to Evans by Gordon Beck, Tony Oxley, Kenny Wheeler, Stan Sulzmann, and Ron Mathewson
- 1981: Elegy for Bill Evans by Richie Beirach
- 1981: Hommages by Gavin Bryars (The opening 15-minute "My First Homage" is to Evans.)
- 1982: Bill Evans—A Tribute by George Shearing, Richie Beirach, Teddy Wilson, Warren Bernhardt, John Lewis, Dave McKenna, Herbie Hancock, Joanne Brackeen, Jimmy Rowles, Dave Frishberg, and McCoy Tyner
- 1982: Oracle's Destiny by Michel Petrucciani
- 1986: Music of Bill Evans by the Kronos Quartet with Eddie Gómez and Jim Hall
- 1987: Dedicated to Bill Evans and Scott LaFaro by Larry Coryell and Miroslav Vitouš
- 1990: Bill Evans by Paul Motian (reissued in 2003, 2009)
- 1990: Evanessence: Tribute to Bill Evans by Fred Hersch (reissued in 1998)
- 1992: Bill Evans ... Person We Knew by Larry Schneider and Andy LaVerne (SteepleChase)
- 1992: Then Along Came Bill: A Tribute to Bill Evans by Sylvia Syms
- 1993: Time Remembered: John McLaughlin Plays Bill Evans by John McLaughlin
- 1994: Now & Then: A Tribute to Bill Evans by Mitchel Forman
- 1994: Your Story: The Music of Bill Evans by Howard Alden with Frank Wess
- 1996: Plays the Music of Bill Evans by Bud Shank
- 1996: Turn Out The Stars—The Songs Of Bill Evans by Dominic Alldis
- 1997: Conversations with Bill Evans by Jean-Yves Thibaudet
- 1998: I Remember Bill: A Tribute to Bill Evans by Don Sebesky and Larry Coryell
- 2000: Conviction: Thoughts Of Bill Evans by Roseanna Vitro
- 2000: Letter to Evans by Renee Rosnes, Ray Drummond, and Billy Drummond
- 2001: Blue in Green by Tierney Sutton
- 2001: Evans Remembered by Enrico Pieranunzi
- 2002: Homage to Bill Evans and Jim Hall by Luigi Tessarollo with Stefano Bollani
- 2002: Play Bill Evans by the Danish Radio Jazz Orchestra and Jim McNeely (reissued 2006, 2012)
- 2002: Portrait of Bill Evans by Bob James, Herbie Hancock, Eliane Elias, Brad Mehldau, and Dave Grusin
- 2006: Paz—Niño Josele and the Music of Bill Evans by Niño Josele
- 2007: Jade Vision: The Music Of Bill Evans by Chris Wabich feat. Larry Koonse, Darek Oles
- 2008: Something for You: Eliane Elias Sings & Plays Bill Evans by Eliane Elias
- 2009: Bill Evans Compositions Vol. 1 & Vol. 2 by Stefano Battaglia
- 2012: Further Explorations by Chick Corea with Eddie Gómez and Paul Motian
- 2013: To Bill Evans by Kerem Görsev
- 2014: Time Remembered: Compositions of Bill Evans by Jim Norton Collective
- 2015: A Tribute to Bill Evans by Monika Lang
- 2017: Kind of Bill by Dado Moroni, Eddie Gómez, and Joe LaBarbera
- 2020: The Real You: A Bill Evans Tribute by Enrico Pieranunzi and Thomas Fonnesbæk
- 2021: Tribute to Bill Evans by George Kontrafouris Trio (Greece)
- 2024: Evans on Evans by Jaden Evans (the pianist's grandson)
- 2024: A Letter to Evans by Michael Wolff
