= Marc Mellits =

American composer and musician (born 1966)

Marc Mellits (born 1966) is an American composer and musician.

Mellits was born in Baltimore, Maryland. He studied at the Eastman School of Music from 1984 to 1988, at the Yale School of Music from 1989 to 1991, at Cornell University from 1991 to 1996, and at Tanglewood in the summer of 1997. His composition instructors include Joseph Schwantner, Samuel Adler, Martin Bresnick, Bernard Rands, Christopher Rouse, Roberto Sierra, Jacob Druckman, Poul Ruders, and Steven Stucky.

Mellits's music has been performed throughout the United States, Canada, and Europe. His music is influenced by minimalist and rock music, and has been identified with the postminimalist stylistic trend. He often composes for electric guitar and other amplified instruments.

Mellits received a 2004 Foundation for Contemporary Arts Grants to Artists Award. Mellits's commissions include pieces for the Orpheus Chamber Orchestra, Bang on a Can All-Stars, Assad Duo, Kronos Quartet, and the Meridian Arts Ensemble. His music has also been arranged by guitarist Dominic Frasca and the experimental music group Electric Kompany.

Mellits is a founding member of Common Sense Composers' Collective, which focuses on new and alternative ways of collaborating with performance ensembles. Mellits is the artistic director and keyboard player in his ensemble, the Mellits Consort.

As of 2011, Marc Mellits lives in Chicago, Illinois with his wife and two daughters, and teaches composition at the University of Illinois-Chicago.

== Works ==
=== Orchestral ===
- Piano Concerto (1984)
- Fanfare (1990)
- O (1991)
- Aro (1993), for chamber orchestra
- Concerto for Piccolo & Orchestra (1995)
- Fruit Loops (1997), for amplified chamber orchestra
- Phase, Inc. (1999), for amplified chamber orchestra
- Brick (2005)
- 3 Machines (2007)
- Concerto for String Quartet & String Orchestra: Tapas (2011)
- Paranoid Cheese (2011), for solo violin and string orchestra

=== Band ===
- Zoot Suit Riot (1998)
- Haiku (2003), for band orchestra and chorus
- Season's Songs (2003), for band and chorus
- Quad (2009)

=== Chamber ===
- Piano Quartet (1985)
- Duo for Alto Flute & Cello (1986)
- String Quartet No. 1 (1986)
- Whales Save Us (1988), for clarinet and trombone
- Insect Heads (1988), for soprano and cello
- Dark Age Machinery (1988), for large chamber ensemble
- Hooley Fooley (1989), for violin and cello
- Music for 22 Strings (1989)
- Bucket (1991), for flute, clarinet, violin, cello, and piano
- Aggravated Assault (1991), for two amplified pianos
- 11 Pieces Flute & Piano (1992)
- Trio (1993), for flute, clarinet, and cello
- Polysorbate 60 (1994), for flute, clarinet, oboe, trumpet, trombone, tuba, piano, violin, bass, and percussion
- Merge Left (1994), for two flutes (or violins) and cello
- Spam (1995), for flute, clarinet/bass clarinet, violin, cello, and piano
- 11 Miniatures (1996), for baroque flute, baroque oboe, baroque violin, viola d'gamba, baroque cello, and harpsichord
- Large Man Looms (1996), for voice and piano
- Spank Me (1997), for two synthesizers
- Fruity Pebbles (1997), for piano trio
- Spin (1998), for violin and piano
- Troica (1998), for flute (or violin), guitar (or electric guitar or piano), and marimba (or piano)
- Edible Vinyl (1998), for two amplified guitars and amplified violin
- 8 Etudes for 2 Guitars (1999)
- 5 Machines (2000), for amplified bass clarinet/soprano saxophone, electric guitar, amplified cello, amplified bass, amplified marimba, and amplified piano
- 2 Pieces for Flute & Guitar (2000)
- Paranoid Cheese (2001), for violin and two marimbas
- Canonada (2001), for flute, clarinet, violin, cello, piano, and drum set
- Paranoid Cheese Project (2001), twelve pieces for amplified violin, amplified cello, amplified marimba, electric guitar, and synthesizer
  - Broken Glass
  - Dreadlocked
  - Lefty's Elegy
  - Machine III
  - Machine IV
  - Machine V
  - Mara's Lullaby (arranged for various other instruments)
  - Zrenden Rodejan, Marija!
  - The Misadventures of Soup
  - Opening
  - paranoid cheese
  - Troica
- Groove Canon (2002), for brass quintet and percussion quintet
- M/W (2002), for piano four hands, cello, and three actors
- Disciples of Gouda (2003), for piano, cello, marimba, and percussion
- Platter of Discontent (2004), for flute, clarinet/bass clarinet, violin, cello, marimba, piano
- String Quartet No. 2: Revolution (2004)
- Tight Sweater (2005), for cello, marimba, and piano
- Gonzalo Speaks (2005), for baritone voice, flute, clarinet/bass clarinet, violin, cello, marimba, and piano
- 5 Quiet Machines (2006), for cello, piano, and marimba
- Farfalle Cotte (2006), for two ocarinas (or two same treble instruments)
- 240 Weeks (2007), for two flutes, two clarinets/bass clarinets, violin, cello, piano, and two percussion
- Desperate Miniature Humans (2007), for oboe and piano
- No Strings Attached (2007), for auchincloss piano (mallet quartet arrangement published in 2021)
- Nina's Lullaby (2007), for flute, clarinet, and bassoon
- Tapas (2007), for violin, viola, and cello (arranged for various other instruments)
- Shredded Paranoid Cheese (2007), for violin, cello, marimba, and vibraphone
- Prime (2008), for bass clarinet, baritone saxophone, two percussion, and piano
- Black (2008), for two bass clarinets (arranged for various other instruments)
- Red (2008), for two marimbas
- Tom (2008), for violin and cello, or two guitars
- Postcards of Dreadlock (2009), for piano four hands
- Tight Sweater Remix (2009), for marimba and piano
- Smoke (2009), for saxophone, guitar, marimba, and drum set
- Octet (2010), for string octet or saxophone octet
- Radu (2010), for cello quartet or solo cello and bass clarinet with three cellos and one bass clarinet
- Electric Sheep (2011), for piano and LEMURBots
- String Quartet No. 4: Prometheus (2011), (clarinet octet arrangement published in 2019)
- Zombie In A Penguin Suit (2012), for cello, piano, and marimba

=== Solo ===
- Intervals (1985), for solo cello
- 10 Colors for Piano (1987)
- Road Trip (1987), for solo organ
- Blue (1996), for solo electro-acoustic guitar
- 5 Chanukah Etudes for the Frascas (1996), for solo electro-acoustic guitar
- Jaana (1997), for solo amplified violin
- Parking Violation (1999), for solo oboe
- Agu (2004), for solo piano
- Zubrowka (2006), for solo violin
- Robotic Etudes (2007), for LEMUR GuitarBot
- Stick (2010), for solo snare drum
- Book of Ruth (2010), for solo cello or solo viola
- Frost (2011), for solo tenor saxophone

== Discography ==
- 1997 Common Sense Composers' Collective: Polysorbate 60
- 2002 Shock of the Old, Common Sense Composers' Collective & American Baroque: 11 Miiniatures for Baroque Ensemble
- 2005 Deviations, Dominic Frasca: Dometude, Lefty's Elegy, Metaclopramide, Dark Age Machinery
- 2006 String Quartet No. 2, Duke Quartet: String Quartet No. 2
- 2006 Tight Sweater, Real Quiet plays the music of Marc Mellits: Tight Sweater, Agu, Fruity Pebbles, Disciples of Gouda
- 2007 Dirty Little Secret, Andrew Russo: Etude No. 1: Medieval Induction
- 2007 TIC, Common Sense Composers' Collective & New Millennium Ensemble: Spam
- 2007 Paranoid Cheese, The Mellits Consort: Opening, Broken Glass, paranoid cheese, The Misadventures of Soup, Lefty's Elegy, Machine IV, Srećan Rođendan, Marija!, Troica, Dreadlocked, Machine III, Machine V
- 2008 Melville's Dozen, Nicola Melville: Etude No. 2: Defensive Chili
- 2008 Mix Tape, Andrew Russo: Spank Me (Menage a Deux), Curried Kaftka (No Strings Attached)
- 2009 Serendipity, Society for New Music: Platter of Discontent
- 2009 American Journey, Roger McVey: Agu
- 2010 Convergence, Strike: Tight Sweater Remix
- 2010 Black, Sqwonk: Black
- 2017 Quatuor Debussy: Marc Mellits, String Quartets n° 3, 4, 5.
