= Ramallah Underground =

Palestinian musical collective

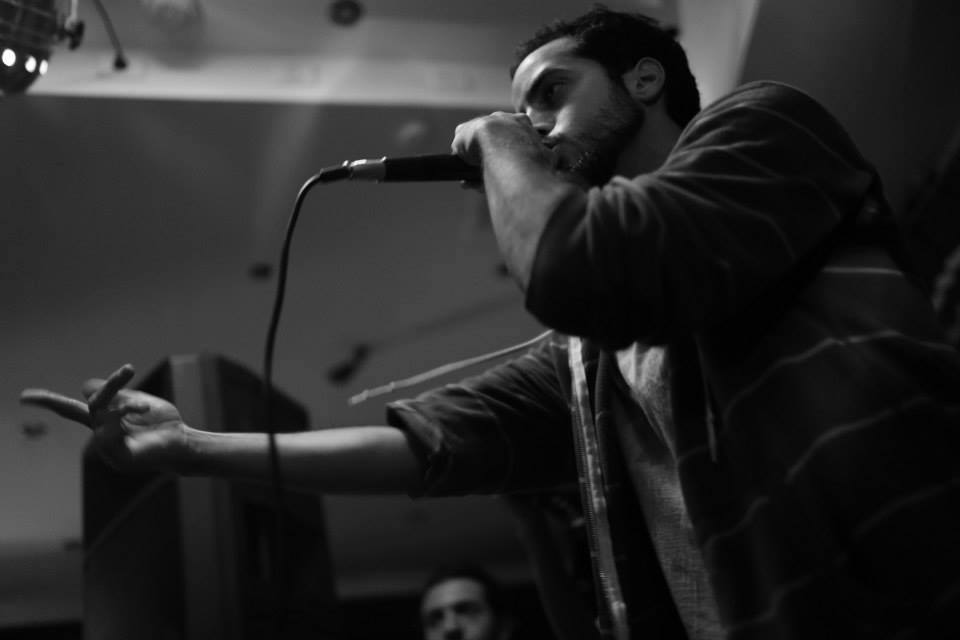
Boikutt performing, 2015

Ramallah Underground, based in Ramallah, Palestine, is a musical collective born in 2002, from the desire to give voice to a generation of Palestinians, in a situation of great economic, artistic, and political difficulty. The collective was founded by artists Stormtrap (later known as Asifeh) and Boikutt (later known as Muqata'a), later joined by Aswatt, who aim to rejuvenate Arabic culture by creating "music that Arabic youth can relate to," in the words of Boikutt. They rap in Arabic, and are credited as some of the founders of Palestinian hip-hop. Their music combines hip-hop, trip hop, and downtempo, besides more traditional Middle-Eastern music, with a commitment to their local culture and an awareness of the imposing presence of Palestine in their lives.

As producers and as MCs, the collective has collaborated with numerous artists across the globe, most recently Slovo, Boikutt appears on the track "Nakba" from their new album Todo Cambia. They have performed live in Ramallah, Bethlehem, Vienna, Melbourne (at the Melbourne International Arts Festival), Liverpool, Cairo, Lausanne, Amsterdam (as part of "Rap4Justice" in the Melkweg), and Washington, D.C., and recently incorporated a visual set by Palestinian visual artist Ruanne Abou-Rahme in their live performances.

Ramallah Underground does not have an official release yet and mostly uses the internet as a way of circulating their music. In fact, their MySpace page led David Harrington of the Kronos Quartet to ask them to collaborate on a piece, "Tashweesh," composed by Boikutt, which the quartet started playing live in 2008. and which is included on their 2009 release Floodplain.

== Discography ==
Ramallahunderground.com Singles

1. "Sijen ib Sijen" (4:25)

2. "Kilmeh (Se'beh Titfasar) - ROUGH MIX" (2:49)

3. "aswatt il zaman" (3:32)

4. "970" (3:03)

5. "Al Zallam" (3:55)

6. "Min il Kaheff" (featuring Lethal Skillz) (4:15)

7. "Hon Habess" (3:51)

8. "Ta'al Shoof" (3:45)

9. "lamal ftoor yiseer 'asha" (2:57)

10. "Mish Beinatna - B Dub remix" (5:06)

11. "Sot Ramallah" (3:49)

12. "Kanabel Mudee'a" (3:01)

13. "Qararat" (featuring Lethal Skillz) (3:47)

14. "Sabe' Nomeh" (3:23)

15. "Dameer Mustater 73" (4:46)

16. "Taht Il Ankad" (2:37)

17. "Mish Beinatna" (2:48)

18. "Areeb Il Shar" (2:47)

19. "Nateejeh Bala Shoghol" (2:29)

20. "Reporting Live" (featuring Bukue One & Chakal) (3:43)
