= Tom Hibbert =

English music journalist and film critic (1952–2011)

Tom Hibbert (28 May 1952 – 28 August 2011) was an English music journalist and film critic. In the 1980s and 1990s, he was a regular writer for music magazines such as Smash Hits, Q and Mojo, and reviewed films for Empire magazine. He was known for his acerbic writing style and irreverent interviews. While at Q, he created the monthly "Who the Hell …?" interview series. In the mid 1990s, he wrote the "Pendennis" column for the Observer newspaper.

== Childhood and early years ==
Hibbert was the second of three children born to author and historian Christopher Hibbert and his wife Anne (née Piggford). With his siblings James and Kate, he grew up in Henley-on-Thames in Oxfordshire. He was the product of a happy home. According to The Guardian's obituary of his father, Christopher Hibbert delighted in "taking his children to appallingly unsuitable films" such as Carry On comedies.

He attended Leighton Park School, a Quaker establishment, in Reading, Berkshire, and a local grammar school. After spending a term at Leeds University, he gave up education and attempted to forge a career as a rock musician before turning to journalism.

== Career ==
Hibbert first wrote for home improvement publications, in the late 1970s, and then for New Music News, a short-lived magazine published by Felix Dennis. Between 1982 and 1984, he contributed to The History of Rock.

In 1983, he joined the staff of Smash Hits. In the description of his editor, Mark Ellen: "[Hibbert] helped invent a cartoon fantasy world in which everyone interviewed seemed to exhibit the same slapstick characteristics. All his subjects – Paul McCartney, David Bowie, Bucks Fizz, John Lydon – were delightfully over-exaggerated, as mischievous and eccentric as their interrogator." This lampooning included renaming well-known musicians based on their character traits, such as "Dame David" for Bowie, "Fab Macca Whacky Thumbs Aloft" for McCartney, "Sir Clifford of Richard" for Cliff Richard, "Lord Frederick Lucan of Mercury" for Freddie Mercury, and "Horrible Headband" for Mark Knopfler. Hibbert later said: "It sounds like I'm blowing my own trumpet but yes, I did [invent Smash Hits lingo]. Before I got there in 1983 there was none of that." He also contributed under the pseudonym "Black Type", writing enigmatic replies on the magazine's letters page.

The success of Smash Hits encouraged the British prime minister, Margaret Thatcher, to sit for an interview with Hibbert in the lead-up to the 1987 general election. The interview gained considerable press coverage. Hoping to win favour among the nation's young voters, Thatcher was instead ridiculed in print for her music tastes, which included Cliff Richard and, as her favourite song, the 1953 hit "(How Much Is) That Doggie in the Window?"

In the late 1980s, Hibbert followed Ellen to Q. Although the magazine was aimed at an older age group and more respectful to established rock stars, Hibbert's contributions retained an element of irreverence. His interviews in the "Who the Hell …?" series led to him travelling around the world. Among his subjects were Jeremy Clarkson, Tom Jones, Jimmy Savile, Jeremy Beadle, Jeffrey Archer, Robert Maxwell, Samantha Fox, Keith Floyd, Bernard Manning and David Mellor. Affronted by Manning's racist remarks, Hibbert replied: "Ha ha ha, you fat bastard." Some stars were similarly offended by Hibbert, who later cited Ringo Starr, Kate Bush and Boy George as disgruntled interviewees.

He began working for Q's sister title Empire in 1989. Its launch editor, Barry McIlheney, fearing that the magazine would be unlikely to gain access to any top film stars, says he thought: "Well, I'm going to have to get Tom Hibbert to write 20 Things About Jack Nicholson, because we're never going to get to interview [Nicholson]." In the early 1990s, Hibbert's interviews also appeared in the American magazine Details. He subsequently contributed to Mojo, another Emap title edited by Ellen, from 1993 onwards.

== Illness and death ==
In 1997, Hibbert was hospitalised in Hammersmith, where he was found to be suffering from pneumonia and acute pancreatitis. Following a three-month stay in intensive care, he was unable to return to work.

He died in August 2011 at the age of 59 from complications related to his diabetes condition. He was survived by his wife, Allyce.
