= Five Tango Sensations =

Studio album by Kronos Quartet & Astor Piazzolla
- Released: 25 January 1991
- Studios: Power Station, New York City
- Genre: Contemporary classical
- Length: 26:46
- Label: Nonesuch (#79254)
- Producer: Judith Sherman

Kronos Quartet chronology
Kevin Volans: Hunting:Gathering (1991)	Five Tango Sensations (1991)	Henryk Mikolaj Górecki: Already It Is Dusk/"Lerchenmusik" (1991)

Five Tango Sensations is a suite of works (Asleep—Loving—Anxiety—Despertar—Fear) for bandoneón and string quartet written in 1989 by Argentine composer Ástor Piazzolla. It was premiered in New York that year and recorded immediately afterwards by the Kronos Quartet and the composer, who played the bandoneón. The record was one of a set of three internationally tinged albums released simultaneously, the Argentine music of this album being accompanied by the music of South-African composer Kevin Volans on Kevin Volans: Hunting:Gathering and the music of Polish composer Witold Lutosławski on Witold Lutosławski: String Quartet.

== The Kronos Quartet and Ástor Piazzolla ==
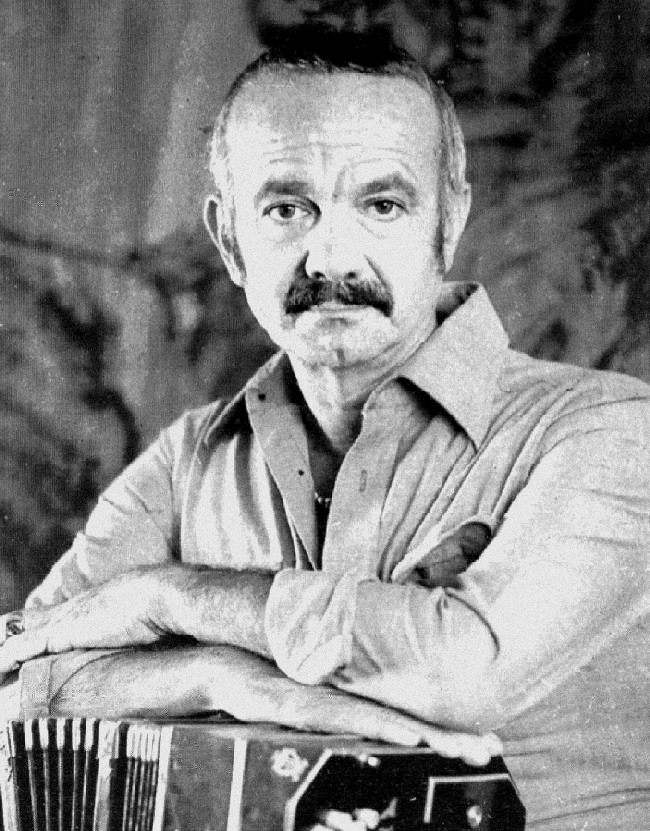
Ástor Piazzolla in 1971.

In 1987, Kronos's executive producer, Robert Hurwitz, had taken Piazzolla, who was on an extended stay in New York City, to see the quartet perform. Backstage, after Piazzolla paid his compliments to the quartet, violinist David Harrington asked if he could call him in a few days; when Harrington called, Piazzolla had already composed "Four, For Tango" for them. (The quartet still plays the piece from photocopies of Piazzolla's original score.) The quartet recorded the piece in November 1987 for their 1988 album Winter Was Hard. They continued their collaboration in live performance; as late as June 1990 Piazzolla and the quartet performed together at a festival in Germany.

The five compositions on this album, "a musical farewell to life," date from 1989, and were written after Piazzolla experienced a grave illness. They were premiered in New York at Alice Tully Hall on 25 November 1989, Piazzolla having flown to New York to play with the quartet for the premiere and the subsequent recordings, which were done in a three-hour session at the Power Station in Manhattan. Harrington remarked that this was the shortest recording session they had ever done, and the quartet noted a "centered sternness" in Piazzolla: according to Harrington, "he pulled the music out of Kronos."

The session with the Kronos Quartet proved to be his last studio recording: Piazzolla, who had revolutionized the traditional tango creating a new style, the nuevo tango, died on 4 July 1992.

== Track listing ==
All music is composed by Ástor Piazzolla.

No.	Title	Length
1.	"Asleep"	5:23
2.	"Loving"	6:10
3.	"Anxiety"	4:51
4.	"Despertar"	6:03
5.	"Fear"	4:00

== Critical reception ==
Professional ratings
Review scores
Source	Rating
Allmusic	4/5 stars

Allan Kozinn, reviewing the compositions for The New York Times after their premiere in New York in 1989, called them "a set of charmingly melodic tangos in which the group supplied an accompaniment to the composer's urbane performances on the accordionlike bandoneon." Adam Greenberg remarks in his review on Allmusic that "Piazzolla plays his heart out on his trusty bandoneon, and the Kronos players accompany to perfection." Michael Barrett, in the San Antonio Express-News, calls it a "work of tragic beauty."

== Personnel ==
=== Musicians ===
- David Harrington – violin
- John Sherba – violin
- Hank Dutt – viola
- Joan Jeanrenaud – cello
- Ástor Piazzolla – bandoneón

=== Production ===
- Recorded and mixed at Power Station, New York City
  - Judith Sherman, Rob Eaton, Dave O'Donnell, Dan Gellert – engineers

== See also ==
- List of 1991 albums
