= Triple Quartet =

1998 composition by Steve Reich

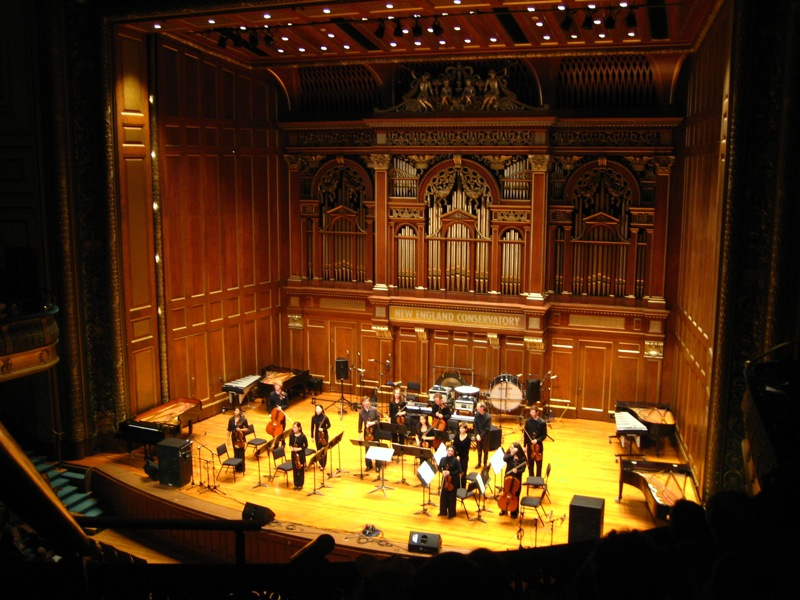
Performance of Triple Quartet, at New England Conservatory, 2007

Triple Quartet is a piece written by Steve Reich in 1998. It was commissioned by and is dedicated to the Kronos Quartet, and was premiered by them on May 22, 1999 in the Kennedy Center, Washington DC. As the name suggests, the triple quartet is written for three string quartets, each containing 2 violins, a viola and a cello. However, it is designed to be performed by only one string quartet through the use of prerecorded tracks for the other 8 voices.

== Structure ==
The composer had this to say about the structure of the piece:

The piece is in three movements (fast–slow–fast) and is organized harmonically on four dominant chords in minor keys a minor third apart—E minor, G minor, B-flat minor, C-sharp minor—and then returning to E minor to form a cycle. The first movement goes through this harmonic cycle twice with a section about one minute long on each of the four dominant chords. The result is a kind of variation form.

Rhythmically, the first movement has the second and third quartet playing interlocking chords while the first quartet plays longer melodies in canon between the first violin and viola against the second violin and cello.

The slow movement is more completely contrapuntal, with a long, slow melody in canon eventually in all 12 voices. It stays in E minor throughout.

The third movement resumes the original fast tempo and maintains the harmonic chord cycle, but modulates back and forth between keys more rapidly. The final section of the movement is in the initial key of E minor, and there the piece finally cadences.
