= Black Angels (album) =

Studio album by Kronos Quartet
- Released: June 29, 1990
- Recorded: 1990
- Genre: Contemporary classical
- Length: 61:40
- Label: Nonesuch Records
- Producer: Judith Sherman; Kronos Quartet

Kronos Quartet chronology
Kronos Quartet Plays Terry Riley: Salome Dances for Peace (1989)	Black Angels (1990)	Witold Lutosławski: String Quartet (1991)

Professional ratings
Review scores
Source	Rating
Allmusic	4/5 stars

Black Angels is a 1990 album by the string quartet Kronos Quartet. It includes, and was named after, George Crumb's 1970 composition Black Angels, the composition which had inspired David Harrington to found the Kronos Quartet in 1973.

== Track listing ==
No.	Title	Writer(s)	Length
1.	"Black Angels, Mvt. I Departure"	George Crumb	5:37
2.	"Black Angels, Mvt. II Absence"	Crumb	5:25
3.	"Black Angels, Mvt. III Return"	Crumb	7:13
4.	"Spem in Alium"	Thomas Tallis, arr. Kronos Quartet	8:52
5.	"Doom. A Sigh"	István Márta	10:54
6.	"They are There!"	Charles Ives	2:47
7.	"Quartet No. 8, Mvt. I Largo"	Dmitri Shostakovich	4:57
8.	"Quartet No. 8, Mvt. II Allegro molto"	Shostakovich	2:36
9.	"Quartet No. 8, Mvt. III Allegretto"	Shostakovich	4:19
10.	"Quartet No. 8, Mvt. IV Largo"	Shostakovich	4:11
11.	"Quartet No. 8, Mvt. V Largo"	Shostakovich	3:57

== Personnel ==
- Hank Dutt – Viola
- Tony Eckert – Engineering (Tracks: A1, A2, B3)
- Bob Edwards – Mixing (Tracks: A1, A2)
- David Harrington – Violin
- Robert Hurwitz – Executive Producer
- Joan Jeanrenaud – Cello
- Juhani Liimatainen – Engineering (Tracks: A1, A2, B3)
- Matt Mahurin – Photography
- John Sherba – Violin
- Judith Sherman – Producer, Engineering, Mixing

== Charts ==
Chart performance for Black Angels
Chart (2024)	Peak position
Hungarian Physical Albums (MAHASZ)	23

== See also ==
- 1990 in music
- Modern classical music
