= Kronos Quartet (album) =

Studio album by Kronos Quartet
- Released: 15 August 1986
- Recorded: June 1985
- Genre: Contemporary classical
- Label: Nonesuch (#79111)
- Producer: Thomas Frost

Kronos Quartet chronology
Music of Bill Evans (1986)	Kronos Quartet (1986)	White Man Sleeps (1987)

Kronos Quartet is a studio album by the Kronos Quartet, the first of their albums on Nonesuch Records. It contains compositions by Australian composer Peter Sculthorpe, Finnish composer Aulis Sallinen, American composer Philip Glass, and American/Mexican composer Conlon Nancarrow. The last track is Jimi Hendrix's "Purple Haze."

== Critical reception ==
Professional ratings
Review scores
Source	Rating
Allmusic	4/5 stars

According to John Rockwell of the New York Times, "The best recorded anthology yet to capture the heady diversity of musical idioms that this San Francisco quartet espouses." Joseph McLellan, for the Washington Post, commented in a similar vein: "This group is absolutely amazing-not merely because of the superb technique with which it tackles the challenging contemporary repertoire, but even more for the breadth of vision that matter-of-factly and quite correctly includes Jimi Hendrix. . . . Hearing this music is a mind-expanding experience."

== Track listing ==
No.	Title	Writer(s)	Length
1.	"String Quartet No. 8, Mvt. I Con dolore"	Peter Sculthorpe	2:04
2.	"String Quartet No. 8, Mvt. II Risoluto"	Sculthorpe	3:49
3.	"String Quartet No. 8, Mvt. III Con dolore"	Sculthorpe	3:02
4.	"String Quartet No. 8, Mvt. IV Con precisione"	Sculthorpe	1:49
5.	"String Quartet No. 8, Mvt. V Con dolore"	Sculthorpe	2:07
6.	"String Quartet No. 3: Some Aspects of Peltoniemi Hintrik's Funeral March"	Aulis Sallinen	14:05
7.	"Company, Mvt. I"	Philip Glass	2:22
8.	"Company, Mvt. II"	Glass	1:36
9.	"Company, Mvt. III"	Glass	1:46
10.	"Company, Mvt. IV"	Glass	2:14
11.	"String Quartet, Mvt. I Allegro molto"	Conlon Nancarrow	2:18
12.	"String Quartet, Mvt. II Andante moderato"	Nancarrow	3:31
13.	"String Quartet, Mvt. III Prestissimo"	Nancarrow	5:17
14.	"Purple Haze"	Jimi Hendrix, arr. Steve Riffkin	2:52

== Credits ==
=== Musicians ===
- David Harrington – violin
- John Sherba – violin
- Hank Dutt – viola
- Joan Jeanrenaud – cello

=== Production ===
- Recorded June 1985 at the American Academy of Arts and Letters, New York
  - Produced by Thomas Frost
  - John Newton – Engineer
  - E. Amelia Rogers – Digital Editing
  - Bob Ludwig – Mastering

== See also ==
- List of 1986 albums
