= At the Grave of Richard Wagner =

Studio album by Kronos Quartet
- Released: 24 September 1993
- Genre: Contemporary classical
- Label: Nonesuch (#79318)
- Producer: Judith Sherman

Kronos Quartet chronology
Henryk Górecki: String Quartets Nos. 1 and 2 (1993)	At the Grave of Richard Wagner (1993)	Morton Feldman: Piano and String Quartet (1993)

At the Grave of Richard Wagner is a studio album by the Kronos Quartet, containing works by Alban Berg and Anton Webern, and a brief "romantic elegy" by Franz Liszt.

== Track listing ==
No.	Title	Writer(s)	Length
1.	"At the Grave of Richard Wagner"	Franz Liszt	2:47
2.	"String Quartet, Op. 3: I"	Alban Berg	9:03
3.	"String Quartet, Op. 3: II"	Berg	10:00
4.	"Five Pieces, Op. 5: I"	Anton Webern	2:26
5.	"Five Pieces, Op. 5: II"	Webern	2:22
6.	"Five Pieces, Op. 5: III"	Webern	0:38
7.	"Five Pieces, Op. 5: IV"	Webern	1:43
8.	"Five Pieces, Op. 5: V"	Webern	3:29

== Critical reception ==
According to Alan Artner, writing in the Chicago Tribune, "Few other recorded performances have had qualities of tone conveying as beautifully the scores' ripe, fibrillating atmosphere." Daniel Webster, in the Milwaukee Journal Sentinel, wrote that " In traditional repertoire, the Kronos Quartet has its own distinctive voice. It plays Liszt's romantic elegy, 'At the Grave of Richard Wagner,' with rich, dark sounds. The performance of Berg's 'String Quartet (Op. 3)' is precise and the quartet makes Webern's 'Five Pieces (Op 5). sound easy to play as the compositions seem to appear magically, shift color and vanish."

== Personnel ==
=== Musicians ===
- David Harrington – violin
- John Sherba – violin
- Hank Dutt – viola
- Joan Jeanrenaud – cello
- Aki Takahashi – piano
- Marcella DeCray – harp

=== Production ===
- Recorded at Skywalker Sound, Nicasio, California
  - Bob Edwards, Judith Sherman – Engineers
  - Craig Silvey – Assistant Engineer (tracks 1–3)
  - Tony Eckert – Assistant Engineer (tracks 4–8)

== See also ==
- List of 1993 albums
