= Short Stories (Kronos Quartet album) =

Studio album by Kronos Quartet
- Released: 5 March 1993
- Studios: Skywalker Sound, Nicasio, California
- Genre: Contemporary classical
- Label: Nonesuch (#79310)

Kronos Quartet chronology
Pieces of Africa (1992)	Short Stories (1993)	Henryk Górecki: String Quartets Nos. 1 and 2 (1993)

Short Stories is a studio album by the Kronos Quartet, containing works by Elliott Sharp, Willie Dixon, John Oswald, John Zorn, Henry Cowell, Steven Mackey, Scott Johnson, Sofia Gubaidulina, and Pandit Pran Nath.

== Track listing ==
No.	Title	Writer(s)	Length
1.	"Digital"	Sharp (1986)	2:39
2.	"Spoonful"	Dixon (1960), arr. Steven Mackey (1989)	4:32
3.	"Spectre"	Oswald (1990)	5:47
4.	"Cat O' Nine Tails (Tex Avery Directs the Marquis de Sade)"	Zorn (1988)	12:48
5.	"Quartet Euphometric"	Cowell (1916–19)	1:54
6.	"Physical Property"	Mackey (1992)	14:31
7.	"Soliloquy"	Johnson (1991–3)	13:13
8.	"String Quartet No. 2"	Gubaidulina (1987)	8:30
9.	"Aba Kee Tayk Hamaree"	Nath	10:56

== Critical reception ==
AllMusic's "Blue" Gene Tyranny describes this album as a, "fascinating collection," of nine pieces by, "very different composers," and that, "the Kronos Quartet is in top form throughout all these selections." A Wired review says that, "a fine mesh of brains and guts, Short Stories is an eclectic roller-coaster ride through 20th-century music."

== Personnel ==
=== Musicians ===
- David Harrington – violin
- John Sherba – violin
- Hank Dutt – viola
- Joan Jeanrenaud – cello
- Steven Mackey – electric guitar
- Pandit Pran Nath – voice
- Krishna Bhatt – tabla
- Terry Riley – tanpura
- John Constant – tanpura

=== Production ===
- Bob Edwards, Howard Johnston – Engineers

== See also ==
- List of 1993 albums
- Plunderphonics
