= Kronos Quartet Plays Sigur Rós =

EP by Kronos Quartet
- Released: 4 September 2007
- Genre: Contemporary classical
- Label: Nonesuch (#307452)
- Producer: Judith Sherman

Kronos Quartet chronology
| Henryk Górecki: String Quartet No. 3 ('...songs are sung') (2007) | Kronos Quartet Plays Sigur Rós (2007) | Terry Riley: The Cusp of Magic (2007) |

Kronos Quartet Plays Sigur Rós is a studio album by the Kronos Quartet, containing two "audience favorites," "Flugufrelsarinn" (by Sigur Rós) and "The Star-Spangled Banner" (trad., arr. S. Prutsman after Jimi Hendrix). The album is available only as a digital download.

== Track listing ==
| No. | Title | Writer(s) | Length |
|---|---|---|---|
| 1. | "Flugufrelsarinn" | Sigur Rós, arr. Stephen Prutsman | 8:22 |
| 2. | "The Star-Spangled Banner" | Traditional, arr. Stephen Prutsman after Jimi Hendrix | 3:41 |

== Musicians ==
- David Harrington – violin
- John Sherba – violin
- Hank Dutt – viola
- Jeffrey Zeigler – cello

== See also ==
- List of 2007 albums
