= Floodplain (Kronos Quartet album) =

Studio album by Kronos Quartet
- Released: 19 May 2009
- Recorded: August 2007 – October 2008
- Genres: Contemporary classical, world music
- Length: 78:50
- Label: Nonesuch (#518349)
- Producer: David Harrington

Kronos Quartet chronology
Terry Riley: The Cusp of Magic (2008)	Floodplain (2009)	Rainbow: Music of Central Asia Vol. 8 (2010)

Floodplain is a studio album by the Kronos Quartet released in 2009. All twelve compositions were written or arranged for the quartet.

== Concept ==
The Kronos Quartet have a long record of commissioning compositions and of collaborating with musicians from around the world. The compositions for this album, all written or arranged for the quartet, hail "from cultures based in areas surrounded by water and prone to catastrophic flooding," ranging from Egypt and Serbia in the west to India in the east; from Central Asia in the north to Ethiopia in the south. According to Nonesuch Records, "The album was inspired by the idea that floodplains...will experience new life after a catastrophe, just as cultures that undergo great difficulty will experience creative fertility."

== Compositions ==
External videos
- Kronos Quartet – Ram Narayan: Alap from Raga Mishra Bhairavi

Floodplain contains twelve compositions, some newly written for the quartet, such as "Tashweesh," a collaboration with the Ramallah Underground and the long piece by Serbian composer Aleksandra Vrebalov that concludes the album, "...hold me, neighbor, in this storm..." Other compositions are older pieces arranged for the quartet, such as "Nihavent Sitro," by Tanburi Cemil Bey; "Mugam Beyati Shiraz," arranged by Azeri composer Rahman Asadollahi from a song perhaps 700 years old; and "Lullaby," a traditional song from the descendants of slaves and Arab traders who inhabit Iran's southern coast. "Raga Mishra Bhairavi: Alap" is modeled after a recording of sarangi player Ram Narayan's interpretation of the alap of the popular raga Bhairavi.

== Instrumentation ==
For these twelve compositions, the quartet and guest players employed a variety of instruments often traditional to the culture of the compositions. Besides the usual violin, viola, and cello, the album includes such instruments as the riq (heard on track 1), the shruti box (on track 5), the electric sitar (played by Wu Man on track 5), the tambura (played by Terry Riley on track 5), a scordatura violin (on track 8), the darbukka (on track 9), and the gusle and tapan (on track 12). Ramallah Underground provides "electronics" on track 2.

On "Getme, Getme," the quartet is accompanied by the Alim Qasimov ensemble, an Azeri group whose bardic vocals are supported by daf and tar (a long neck stringed instrument), balaban (a double-reed wind instrument), kamancheh (a bowed string instrument), and nagara (a folk drum).

The most unusual instrumentation is found on "Tèw semagn hagèré (Listen to Me, My Fellow Countrymen)," a song by Alèmu Aga, the Ethiopian singer and composer who is also the master of the begena, an Ethiopian 10-string lyre. The quartet had instruments built by Walter Kitundu, a MacArthur fellow, inventor and builder of "phonoharps" and the "Kronos Instrument Builder in residence." Inspired by the begena, he built an instrument he called the "Beguèna Maridhia," which is played by Jeffrey Ziegler, while Hank Dutt plays a modified viola suggestive of Aga's voice.

== Reception ==
Professional ratings
Review scores
Source	Rating
Allmusic	5/5 stars
The Guardian	4/5 stars
The New York Times	(not rated)
The Oregonian	(favorable)
The Times	4/5 stars

Floodplain entered the Billboard Top World Albums chart in the week of June 6, 2009, on position six. The album received positive reviews. David Stabler, writing for The Oregonian, notes that "'Floodplain' has a wildness about it that is especially impassioned and unpredictable. It feels unusually current, even politically current, with music from parts of the world we often only read about"; he recommends it highly.

== Track listing ==
No.	Title	Writer(s)	Length
1.	"Ya Habibi Ta'ala (My Love, Come Quickly)" (Egypt)	Midhat Assem, arr. Osvaldo Golijov & Kronos Quartet	2:57
2.	"Tashweesh (Interference)" (Palestine)	Ramallah Underground, arr. Kronos Quartet & Jacob Garchik	3:22
3.	"Wa Habibi (Beloved)" (Lebanon)	Traditional, arr. Stephen Prutsman	3:11
4.	"Getme, Getme (Don't Leave, Don't Leave)" (Azerbaijan)	Said Rustamov, arr. Alim Qasimov, string arr. Jacob Garchik	12:05
5.	"Raga Mishra Bhairavi: Alap" (India)	Ram Narayan, arr. Kronos Quartet, transc. Ljova	7:13
6.	"Oh Mother, the Handsome Man Tortures Me" (Iraq)	Unknown, arr. Ljova & Kronos Quartet	3:01
7.	"Mugam Beyati Shiraz" (Azerbaijan)	Rahman Asadollahi, arr. Kronos Quartet, transc. Ljova	9:23
8.	"Lullaby" (Iran)	Traditional, arr. Kronos Quartet & Jacob Garchik	4:09
9.	"Nihavent Sirto" (Turkey)	Tanburi Cemil Bey, arr. Stephen Prutsman	3:17
10.	"Kara Kemir" (Kazakhstan)	Kuat Shildebaev, arr. Kronos Quartet	4:24
11.	"Tèw semagn hagèré (Listen to Me, My Fellow Countrymen)" (Ethiopia)	Alèmu Aga, arr. Jacob Garchik	4:03
12.	"...hold me, neighbor, in this storm..." (Serbia)	Aleksandra Vrebalov	21:46

== Personnel ==
=== Musicians ===
- David Harrington – violin
- John Sherba – violin
- Hank Dutt – viola
- Jeffrey Zeigler – cello

=== Production ===
- Recorded August 2007 – October 2008 at Architecture, Los Angeles
  - Scott Fraser – engineer
  - Dann Thompson – assistant engineer
  - Jeanne Velonis – editing assistant
- "Getme, Getme" recorded live at the Ramadan Nights Festival at the Barbican Centre, London, England, on 26 September 2008
  - Adam Whitford – engineer
- "Raga Mishra Bhairavi" drone (cello, electric sitar, shruti box, and tambura) recorded at Skywalker Sound, Nicasio, California, August 2006
  - Judith Sherman – producer
  - Scott Fraser – engineer
  - Dann Thompson – assistant engineer
- "Tèw semagn hagèré" recorded at Whip Records, Berkeley, California, October 2008
  - David Landon – assistant engineer

== See also ==
- List of 2009 albums
