= Uniko =

Studio album by Kronos Quartet
- Released: 1 February 2011
- Recorded: 2007
- Genre: Contemporary classical
- Label: Ondine (#B004GX91Q6)
- Producer: Valgeir Sigurðsson

Kronos Quartet chronology
Rainbow: Music of Central Asia Vol. 8 (2010)	Uniko (2011)

Uniko is a composition by Finnish musicians Kimmo Pohjonen and Samuli Kosminen, which was commissioned by the Kronos Quartet in 2003. It was first performed in 2003. The composition has seven parts, and combines accordion, strings, and vocals. A version of it was recorded in 2007, and released in 2011.

== Performances ==
Uniko premiered in 2004 and was also performed in 2007 in New York City at the BAM NEXT WAVE festival, and in 2012 at Colours of Ostrava. A 2013 performance at the Barbican Centre in London was criticized by John Allison, writing for The Daily Telegraph, for being "an utterly mediocre easy-listening show". Allison was unimpressed by how much the potential of the accordion was put to use, and did not care for what the strings played either: "the quartet's simple riffs are momentarily haunting only because of the respite they supply, but they are desperately bland". Robin Denselow, for The Guardian, was of an opposite opinion, and praised the concert as an "exhilarating performance" of "cutting-edge music" even by Kronos' standards: "Uniko was a constantly shifting kaleidoscope of avant-garde electronica, global folk styles and classical influences, with surround-sound and visual effects added in. It was an extraordinary piece of music."

The composition includes strings, accordion, and vocals. According to Allison, "Live electro-accordion, voice and string quartet are all mixed with sampled accordion, strings and percussion and fed into a multilayered sonic environment that washes over the audience". Tristan Bath, writing for The Quietus, describes the music as "Finnish folk mesh[ed] with contemporary electronic tropes and Kronos' strings". Bath, reviewing the record, was more positive than Allison, and said "Now in its 40th year, and umpteenth incarnation, the Kronos Quartet are on top form on Uniko, with several high points showcasing David Harrington’s subtle instrumental prowess in particular. Other moments, demonstrate the unique variety of sounds offered by the accordion, from Pohjonen’s percussive body taps to the wind-like creaking of bellows."

== Track listing ==
All music is composed by Kimmo Pohjonen and Samuli Kosminen.

No.	Title	Length
1.	"Uniko: I. Utu"	6:58
2.	"Uniko: II. Plasma"	6:15
3.	"Uniko: III. Särmä"	5:34
4.	"Uniko: IV. Kalma"	11:00
5.	"Uniko: V. Kamala"	5:38
6.	"Uniko: VI. Emo"	10:19
7.	"Uniko: VII. Avara"	6:00

== Credits ==
=== Musicians ===
- David Harrington – violin
- John Sherba – violin
- Hank Dutt – viola
- Jeffrey Zeigler – cello
- Kimmo Pohjonen – accordion, voice
- Samuli Kosminen – electronic percussion, samples, programming

=== Production ===
Recorded at Avatar Studios, New York City, 2007

- Valgeir Sigurðsson – producer
- Pauli Sastamoinen – mastering
- Phillip Page – executive producer
- Rixi Ostariz – graphics and design
- Chikako Harada – photography

== See also ==
- List of 2011 albums
