= Monk Suite: Kronos Quartet Plays Music of Thelonious Monk =

Studio album by Kronos Quartet
- Released: 1985
- Recorded: Fall 1984
- Genre: contemporary classical, jazz
- Label: Landmark (#1505)
- Producer: Orrin Keepnews

Kronos Quartet chronology
In Formation (1982)	Monk Suite: Kronos Quartet Plays Music of Thelonious Monk (1985)	Terry Riley: Cadenza on the Night Plain (1985)

Monk Suite: Kronos Quartet Plays Music of Thelonious Monk is a studio album by the Kronos Quartet. The album contains compositions by Thelonious Monk. The quartet is joined by Ron Carter (bass) on "Off Minor/Epistrophy" and by Chuck Israels (bass) and Eddie Marshall (drums) on the Duke Ellington composition "Black and Tan Fantasy". It was re-released in 2005 as CD, on Savoy, and re-issued with Music of Bill Evans on 2CD as 32 Jazz: The Complete Landmark Sessions.

== Track listing ==
All music is composed by Thelonious Monk except as noted.

No.	Title	Writer(s)	Length
1.	"Well You Needn't"		4:59
2.	"Rhythm-A-Ning"		3:04
3.	"Crepuscule with Nellie"		2:39
4.	"Off Minor/Epistrophy"		8:11
5.	"'Round Midnight"		4:34
6.	"Misterioso"		4:00
7.	"It Don't Mean a Thing (If It Ain't Got That Swing)"	Duke Ellington, Irving Mills	4:03
8.	"Black and Tan Fantasy"	Ellington, Bubber Miley	3:43
9.	"Brilliant Corners"		5:07

== See also ==
- List of 1985 albums
