= Steven Mackey =

American composer

Steven "Steve" Mackey (born February 14, 1956) is an American composer, guitarist, and music educator.

== Biography ==
As a musician growing up listening to and performing vernacular American musics as well as classical music, Mackey's compositions are influenced by rock and jazz, though in an avant-garde vein. He favors the electric guitar and frequently performs his own compositions for the instrument, which include a concerto for electric guitar and orchestra (Tuck and Roll) and two works for electric guitar and string quartet (Physical Property and Troubadour Songs). As an electric guitar soloist, he has performed with the Kronos Quartet (Short Stories), the Arditti Quartet, New World Symphony, Dutch Radio Symphony, and London Sinfonietta.

Among Mackey's notable awards include a Guggenheim fellowship, a Charles Ives Scholarship from the American Academy and Institute of Arts and Letters, two awards from the Kennedy Center for the performing arts, and the Stoeger Prize for Chamber Music by The Chamber Music Society of Lincoln Center, the Miami performing arts center acknowledged his contributions to orchestral music with a special career achievement award, the Koussevitzky Foundation at the Library of Congress, the Fromm Foundation, the 1987 Kennedy Center Friedheim Awards, and was chosen to represent the United States in the International Composers Rostrum in Paris, France. He also served as Composer-in-Residence at the Aspen Music Festival in 1985 among many other residencies such as Yellow barn, Imagine Festival and Bennington. More recently, Mackey was announced Composer in Residence at Tanglewood in the summer of 2006 and was co-composer in residence with Christopher Rouse at the 2007 Aspen Music Festival.

Born in Frankfurt, Germany, 1956 to American parents, Mackey was raised in northern California. He was graduated summa cum laude with a B.A. from the University of California, Davis, followed by an M.A. at the State University of New York at Stony Brook, and a Ph.D from Brandeis University. Since 1985 Mackey has served as a professor of music at Princeton University, where he teaches composition, theory, twentieth century music, improvisation, and a variety of special topics. He is also a co-director of the Princeton Composers' Ensemble and in 1991, he was awarded that university's first-ever Distinguished Teaching Award. Mackey's music is published by Boosey & Hawkes. His compositions have been released on the Bridge, BMG/RCA Red Seal, Albany, New World, Nonesuch, BMG/Catalyst, CRI, Min/Max, and Newport Classic labels.

== See also ==
- Joseph H. Bearns Prize

== Interviews ==
- Steven Mackey on Steven Mackey. Documentary
- Steven Mackey (June 13, 2005). "Steven Mackey: Outsider On the Inside". NewMusicBox (video included). Interviewed by Frank J. Oteri (published July 1, 2005).
- Steven Mackey interviewed by Michael Schell. Flotation Device, KBCS-FM Bellevue/Seattle/Tacoma (January 28, 2024)
