= Music of Bill Evans =

Studio album by Kronos Quartet
- Released: 1986
- Recorded: fall 1985
- Genres: contemporary classical, jazz
- Labels: Landmark (#1510), Savoy (#17405)

Kronos Quartet chronology
Terry Riley: Cadenza on the Night Plain (1985)	Music of Bill Evans (1986)	Kronos Quartet (1986)

Music of Bill Evans is a studio album by the Kronos Quartet, containing compositions written by or associated with Bill Evans and arranged by Tom Darter. Several tracks feature important jazz players who had recorded with Evans: Jim Hall on guitar and Eddie Gómez on bass.

Lead violinist David Harrington takes "the role of Bill's right hand throughout—described by the violinist as possibly the hardest work he has ever attempted."

Jazz critic Leonard Feather gave the album five stars, and Stephen Holden, writing for The New York Times, named it "Jazz Album of the Week."

American minimalist composer Terry Riley said of the album, "The consummate artistry that Bill Evans brought to every moment of his piano playing is also revealed in these magical compositions, performed with exciting nuance by a group whose ecstatic recreations of contemporary music have redefined the string quartet."

The album was reissued with Monk Suite: Kronos Quartet Plays Music of Thelonious Monk on two CDs as 32 Jazz: The Complete Landmark Sessions (1997).

== Track listing ==
All tracks are written by Bill Evans except as noted.

No.	Title	Writer(s)	Length
1.	"Waltz for Debby"		5:42
2.	"Very Early"		4:01
3.	"Nardis"	Miles Davis	5:04
4.	"Re: Person I Knew"		4:25
5.	"Time Remembered"		3:15
6.	"Walking Up"		2:30
7.	"Turn Out the Stars"		6:32
8.	"Five"		2:39
9.	"Peace Piece"		7:11

== Personnel ==
- David Harrington, first violin
- John Sherba, second violin
- Hank Dutt, viola
- Joan Jeanrenaud, cello
- Eddie Gómez, bass, tracks 1–3
- Jim Hall, guitar, tracks 6–8
- Tom Darter, arranger
- Orrin Keepnews, producer and liner notes

== See also ==
- List of 1986 albums
- List of Bill Evans tribute albums
