= In Formation =

Studio album by Kronos Quartet
- Released: 1982
- Recorded: 1979 at St. Mary's Cathedral, San Francisco
- Genre: Contemporary classical
- Label: Reference Recordings (#9)

Kronos Quartet chronology
In Formation (1982)	Monk Suite: Kronos Quartet Plays Music of Thelonious Monk (1985)

In Formation is the first studio album by the Kronos Quartet. It contains compositions by Ken Benshof, Hunt Beyer, Alan Dorsey, John Geist, David Kechley, and others. The album was re-issued on CD on 17 December 1993 (Reference #RR-9CD).

== Track listing ==
No.	Title	Writer(s)	Length
1.	"The Funky Chicken"	David Kechley	3:17
2.	"Remember"	Ken Benshoof	3:23
3.	"Blues"	Derek Thunes	3:42
4.	"When"	Benshoof	2:24
5.	"Enantiodromia High"	Hunt Beyer	3:24
6.	"Joan's Blue"	Alan Dorsey	3:32
7.	"Wind on My Back"	Thunes	5:09
8.	"The Junk Food Blues"	John Whitney	2:32
9.	"Dark Razz"	John Geist	3:38
10.	"Whatever Happened to the Hoodoo Meat Bucket?"	Dorsey	2:29

== Critical reception ==
In Fanfare magazine, the albums was praised highly: "In imaging, transient accuracy and timbre, one of the finest string quartet discs ever issued."

== Personnel ==
- David Harrington – violin
- John Sherba – violin
- Hank Dutt – viola
- Joan Jeanrenaud – cello
