= Henryk Górecki: String Quartets Nos. 1 and 2 =

Studio album by Kronos Quartet
- Released: 25 June 1993
- Recorded: July 1990, August 1992
- Genre: Contemporary classical
- Label: Nonesuch (#79319)

Kronos Quartet chronology
Short Stories (1993)	Henryk Górecki: String Quartets Nos. 1 and 2 (1993)	At the Grave of Richard Wagner (1993)

Henryk Górecki: String Quartets Nos. 1 and 2 is a studio album by the Kronos Quartet, with two compositions by Polish composer Henryk Górecki. The Kronos Quartet had recorded "Already It Is Dusk", his first string quartet, in 1990 and released it on Henryk Mikolaj Górecki: Already It Is Dusk/"Lerchenmusik". The Kronos Quartet recorded and released all three of Górecki's string quartets, the third and last in 2007, on Henryk Górecki: String Quartet No. 3 ('...songs are sung').

== Track listing ==
All music is composed by Henryk Górecki.

No.	Title	Length
1.	"Already It Is Dusk (String Quartet No. 1), Op. 62"	13:59
2.	"Quasi una Fantasia: String Quartet No. 2, Op. 64: I. Largo Sostenuto – Mesto"	8:07
3.	"Quasi una Fantasia: String Quartet No. 2, Op. 64: II. Deciso—Energico; Furioso, Tranquillo – Mesto"	6:45
4.	"Quasi una Fantasia: String Quartet No. 2, Op. 64: III. Arioso: Adagio Cantabile"	7:24
5.	"Quasi una Fantasia: String Quartet No. 2, Op.64: IV. Allegro—Sempre Con Grand"	9:31

== Critical reception ==
Michael Walsh, writing for Time, called Górecki "an uncompromising modernist who just may be the Bruckner of our day," and the performance of the string quartets by the "inestimable Kronos Quartet . . . excellent."

== Credits ==
=== Musicians ===
- David Harrington – violin
- John Sherba – violin
- Hank Dutt – viola
- Joan Jeanrenaud – cello

=== Production ===
- Track 1 recorded July 1990 at Skywalker Sound, Nicasio, California
  - Bob Edwards, Judith Sherman – engineers
- Tracks 2–5 recorded August 1992 at Skywalker Sound
  - Bob Edwards, Judith Sherman – engineers
  - Craig Silvey – assistant engineer
