= Witold Lutosławski: String Quartet =

Studio album by Kronos Quartet
- Released: 27 January 1991
- Genre: Contemporary classical
- Label: Nonesuch (#79255)
- Producer: Judith Sherman

Kronos Quartet chronology
Black Angels (1990)	Witold Lutosławski: String Quartet (1991)	Kevin Volans: Hunting:Gathering (199)

Witold Lutosławski: String Quartet is a studio album by the Kronos Quartet, containing String Quartet by Polish Witold Lutosławski composed in 1964 and first performed in 1965. This string quartet is an example of aleatory music, that is, music in which some element of the composition is left to chance, and/or some primary element of a composed work's realization is left to the determination of its performer(s). As Gerald Gold noted in a review of the Kronos album in The New York Times, "the Lutoslawski composition integrates notated music with chance performance."

== Track listing ==
No.	Title	Writer(s)	Length
1.	"String Quartet: Introductory Movement"	Witold Lutosławski	8:33
2.	"String Quartet: Main Movement"	Witold Lutosławski	15:14

== Credits ==
=== Musicians ===
- David Harrington – violin
- John Sherba – violin
- Hank Dutt – viola
- Joan Jeanrenaud – cello

=== Production ===
- Recorded at Skywalker Sound, Nicasio, California
  - Judith Sherman, Juhani Liimatainen, and Tony Eckert – engineers

== See also ==
- List of 1993 albums
