= Mishima: A Life in Four Chapters (soundtrack) =

Soundtrack album by Kronos Quartet, Michael Riesman
- Released: 1985
- Genre: Classical
- Label: Nonesuch Records
- Producer: Kurt Munkacsi

Mishima: A Life in Four Chapters is the soundtrack to the 1985 film Mishima: A Life in Four Chapters. It features music written by Philip Glass and performed by, among others, Kronos Quartet. Sections from the soundtrack have been featured in other films and TV shows, including the piece 'Mishima / Opening', which was used to score the end credits of Peter Weir's 1998 film The Truman Show in addition to an appearance on an episode of Mr. Robot.

Paralleling the three different visual styles of the film, Glass uses different ensembles: The black-and-white biographical flashbacks are accompanied by a string quartet, whereas the realistic footage from Mishima's last day is accompanied by a string orchestra and percussion, and the stylized scenes from his novels with a large symphonic orchestra.

It was produced by Kurt Munkacsi and distributed by WEA through the Elektra Records subsidiary label Nonesuch Records.

== Tracks ==
All music is composed by Philip Glass.

No.	Title	Length
1.	"Mishima / Opening"	2:46
2.	"November 25: Morning"	4:08
3.	"1934: Grandmother & Kimitake"	3:37
4.	"Temple of The Golden Pavilion (Like Some Enormous Music)"	3:06
5.	"Osamu's Theme: Kyoko's House"	2:58
6.	"1937: Saint Sebastian"	1:05
7.	"Kyoko's House (Stage Blood Is Not Enough)"	5:00
8.	"November 25: Ichigaya"	2:11
9.	"1957: Award Montage"	3:56
10.	"Runaway Horses (Poetry Written with a Splash Of Blood)"	9:09
11.	"1962: Body Building"	1:29
12.	"November 25: The Last Day"	1:30
13.	"F-104: Epilogue from Sun and Steel"	1:59
14.	"Mishima / Closing"	2:57

== Credits ==
- Michael Riesman – conductor
- The Kronos Quartet – string quartet
- Neil Grover – percussion
- Don Christensen – assistant recording engineer
- Dan Dryden – recording engineer
- Kurt Munkacsi – producer
