= Kevin Volans: Hunting:Gathering =

Studio album by Kronos Quartet
- Released: 27 January 1991
- Genre: Contemporary classical
- Label: Nonesuch (#79253)
- Producer: Judith Sherman

Kronos Quartet chronology
Witold Lutosławski: String Quartet (1991)	Kevin Volans: Hunting:Gathering (1991)	Five Tango Sensations (1991)

Kevin Volans: Hunting:Gathering is a studio album by the Kronos Quartet, containing works by South African composer Kevin Volans composed especially for the quartet.

== Track listing ==
All music is composed by Kevin Volans.

No.	Title	Length
1.	"String Quartet No. 2: I"	8:57
2.	"String Quartet No. 2: II"	9:15
3.	"String Quartet No. 2: III"	2:48

== Critical reception ==
The New York Times called Hunting:Gathering "a work that moves freely among African rhythmic and melodic shapes, contemporary Western harmonies and tone-shaping techniques, and distorted glimpses of Haydnesque Classicism."

== Credits ==
=== Musicians ===
- David Harrington – violin
- John Sherba – violin
- Hank Dutt – viola
- Joan Jeanrenaud – cello

=== Production ===
- Recorded at Skywalker Sound, Nicasio, California
  - Judith Sherman, Juhani Liimatainen, and Tony Eckert – engineers

== See also ==
- List of 1993 albums
