= Winter Was Hard =

Studio album by Kronos Quartet
- Released: 30 September 1988
- Genre: Contemporary classical
- Label: Nonesuch (#79181)
- Producer: Judith Sherman, John Zorn

Kronos Quartet chronology
White Man Sleeps (1988)	Winter Was Hard (1988)	Steve Reich: Different Trains/Electric Counterpoint (1989)

Professional ratings
Review scores
Source	Rating
Allmusic	3/5 stars

Winter Was Hard is a studio album by the Kronos Quartet. It contains compositions by Aulis Sallinen, Terry Riley, Arvo Pärt, Anton Webern, John Zorn, John Lurie, Ástor Piazzolla, Alfred Schnittke, and Samuel Barber.

== Track listing ==
No.	Title	Writer(s)	Length
1.	"Winter Was Hard Op. 20"	Aulis Sallinen	1:40
2.	"Half-Wolf Dances Mad in Moonlight"	Terry Riley	8:21
3.	"Fratres"	Arvo Pärt	9:23
4.	"Six Bagatelles, Op. 9"	Anton Webern	3:57
5.	"Forbidden Fruit"	John Zorn	10:20
6.	"Bella By Barlight"	John Lurie	2:47
7.	"Four, For Tango"	Ástor Piazzolla	4:41
8.	"Quartet No. 3"	Alfred Schnittke	19:06
9.	"Adagio"	Samuel Barber	7:09
10.	"A Door is Ajar"	traditional	0:37

== Critical reception ==
The album was listed at #11 in the Los Angeles Times Classical Top 25 of 1989. Brian Olewnick, in the All Music Guide to Jazz, calls it a "fairly typical early mélange type recording by Kronos, mixing in au courant contemporary fare with a downtown edge and 20th century classics."

== Credits ==
=== Musicians ===
- David Harrington – violin
- John Sherba – violin
- Hank Dutt – viola
- Joan Jeanrenaud – cello
- San Francisco Girls Chorus, Elizabeth Appling, director ("Winter Was Hard Op. 20")
- Earl L. Miller – reed organ ("Winter Was Hard Op. 20")
- Christian Marclay – turntables ("Forbidden Fruit")
- Ohta Hiromi – voice ("Forbidden Fruit")

=== Production ===
- Tracks 1–4, 6–10 recorded November 1987 at Methuen Memorial Music Hall, Methuen, Massachusetts
  - John Newton – Engineer
- Track 1 recorded January 1988 at St. Ignatius Church, San Francisco, CA
  - Howard Johnston, John Newton – Engineers
- Track 5 produced by John Zorn, recorded September 1987 at Russian Hill Recording, San Francisco, CA (Howard Johnston – Engineer) and at Metal Box Studio, Tokyo, Japan (Ono Seigen – Engineer); mixed September 1987 at CBS Roppongi Studio, Tokyo, Japan by Ono Seigen

== See also ==
- List of 1988 albums
