= Dominic Frasca =

- Born: 5 April 1967 (age 59); Akron, Ohio
- Origin: Italian-Hungarian-American
- Instrument: Guitar
- Label: Cantaloupe

Dominic Frasca (born 5 April 1967) is a guitarist, originally from Akron, Ohio, USA, but living in New York City since the early 1990s. He began playing hard rock guitar at age 13, but gravitated into classical after finding an ad for classical guitar lessons in a school trash can. Frasca originally entered the University of Arizona with the intent of studying classical guitar, but realized after a year that it was not his style. Leaving the university after his scholarship for classical guitar was canceled, he enrolled in colleges in Ohio, also trying Yale University, where he first met the composer Marc Mellits. The friendship and collaboration did not begin until Mellits and Frasca met once more, through a mutual friend at Cornell University.

Seeking to perfect his art, Frasca had an extensive practice routine, often spending up to 14 hours a day playing. While it initially added to his abilities, the rigor took its toll; he developed focal dystonia — the loss of motor control in his fingers. He spent two years seeking treatment for the condition, unable to play at all. He turned to weight training as a source of help. By keeping a balance between his practice and working out, he regained full use of his hands in 2003.

He is probably best known for his customized ten-string guitar, which allows him to create a unique, layered sound normally only accomplishable using multiple instruments or post-recording techniques such as overdubbing.

Frasca's technique incorporates classical guitar technique in the right hand as well as rock techniques such as tapping, hammer-ons and pull-offs in the left hand. But Frasca has also expanded beyond these traditional techniques by inventing and creating other techniques to meet specific needs or problems presented by a specific composition. These include the use of a prepared guitar, with single string "mini-capos", the addition of pads on the body of the guitar (which Frasca uses for a myriad of percussion sounds and timbres), and attached sticks and levers on the body of the guitar, used to create percussive sounds. "All my inspiration comes from ensembles," Frasca says. "Most notably The Philip Glass Ensemble, Steve Reich and Musicians, Anthony Davis and Episteme, The Who, The Ástor Piazzolla Quintet, and Led Zeppelin to name a few." "It always bothered me that when I would go to a classical guitar concert I would often leave knowing nothing about the person I just spent two hours listening to. I want people to know who I am and I want to know who my audience is - the most fundamental way that people communicate is by discovery."

Frasca has been called "Eddie Van Halen for eggheads" by Entertainment Weekly. He is currently signed with Cantaloupe Music and has released two albums, entitled Deviations, and Forced Entry.

In 2005, Frasca opened a small, high-tech, surround-sound nightclub in New York City named The Monkey, which he has described as "a space that is all about the music, the sound and the visuals, not about selling drinks". The performance space is on the 12th floor of a building.
