= Kronos Quartet Plays Terry Riley: Salome Dances for Peace =

Studio album by Kronos Quartet
- Released: October 27, 1989
- Recorded: August 1988 at "Skywalker Ranch", Nicasio, California
- Genre: Experimental music Western classical music Minimalist music Electronic music
- Length: 1:58:33
- Label: Nonesuch
- Producer: Robert Hurwitz, Judith Sherman

Kronos Quartet chronology
Different Trains/Electric Counterpoint (1989)	Kronos Quartet Plays Terry Riley: Salome Dances for Peace (1989)	Black Angels (1990)

Professional ratings
Review scores
Source	Rating
Allmusic	5/5 stars

Kronos Quartet Plays Terry Riley: Salome Dances for Peace is a 1989 album by the string quartet Kronos Quartet. In 1991, the album was nominated the Grammy Award for Best Classical Contemporary Composition.

== Track listing ==
All music is composed by Terry Riley.

Disc one
No.	Title	Length
1.	"I. Anthem of the Great Spirit: The Summons"	4:55
2.	"I. Anthem of the Great Spirit: Peace Dance"	10:57
3.	"I. Anthem of the Great Spirit: Fanfare in the Minimal Kingdom"	4:29
4.	"I. Anthem of the Great Spirit: Ceremonial Night Race"	4:42
5.	"I. Anthem of the Great Spirit: At the Ancient Aztec Corn Races Salome Meets Wild Talker"	2:02
6.	"I. Anthem of the Great Spirit: More Ceremonial Races"	0:50
7.	"I. Anthem of the Great Spirit: Oldtimers at the Races"	3:48
8.	"I. Anthem of the Great Spirit: Half Wolf Dances Mad in Moonlight"	8:12
9.	"II. Conquest of the War Demons: Way of the Warrior"	5:08
10.	"II. Conquest of the War Demons: Salome and Half Wolf Descend Through the Gates to the Underworld"	4:35
11.	"II. Conquest of the War Demons: Breakthrough to the Realm of the War Demons"	2:37
12.	"II. Conquest of the War Demons: Combat Dance"	3:52
13.	"II. Conquest of the War Demons: Victory: Salome Re-enacts for Half Wolf Her Deeds of Valor"	0:43
14.	"II. Conquest of the War Demons: Discovery of Peace"	3:36
15.	"II. Conquest of the War Demons: The Underworld Arising"	10:08

Disc two
No.	Title	Length
1.	"III. The Gift: Echoes of Primordial Time"	11:13
2.	"III. The Gift: Mongolian Winds"	4:12
3.	"IV. The Ecstasy: Processional"	2:09
4.	"IV. The Ecstasy: Seduction of the Bear Father"	3:11
5.	"IV. The Ecstasy: The Gathering"	5:40
6.	"IV. The Ecstasy: At the Summit"	5:22
7.	"IV. The Ecstasy: Recessional"	2:02
8.	"V. Good Medicine: Good Medicine Dance"	13:25

== Personnel ==
Kronos Quartet

- Hank Dutt – viola
- David Harrington – violin
- Joan Jeanrenaud – cello
- John Sherba – violin

Production

- Erwin Blumenfeld – photography
- Michele Clement – photography
- Henrik Drescher – illustrations
- Robert Hurwitz – production
- Robert C. Ludwig – mastering
- Manhattan Design – art direction, design
- Michael McIntyre – photography
- John Newton – engineering
- Frank Olinsky – art direction, design
- Judith Sherman – production
