= Organ concerto =

Musical work for solo organ and ensemble

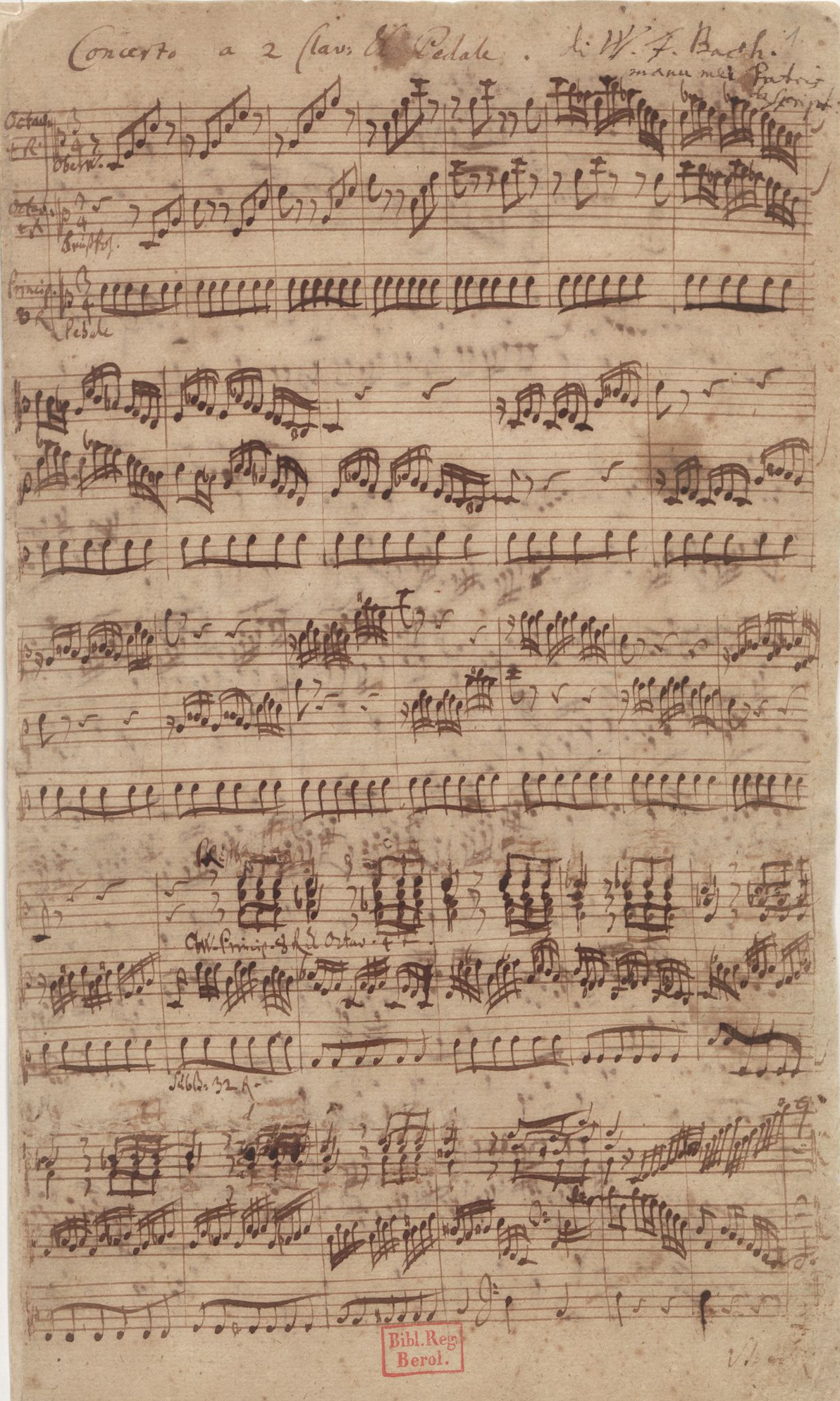
Autograph manuscript of J.S. Bach's Organ Concerto in D minor, BWV 596

An organ concerto is a type of classical music composition in which a pipe organ soloist is accompanied by an orchestra, although some works exist with the name "concerto" which are for organ alone.

The orchestral form first evolved in the 18th century, when composers including Antonio Vivaldi and George Frideric Handel wrote organ concertos with small orchestras; these organ parts rarely if ever call for the organ pedal board. During the Classical period the organ concerto became popular in many places, especially in Bavaria, Austria and Bohemia (whether called there a concerto, pastorella, or sonata), reaching a position of being almost an integral part of the church music tradition of jubilus character. From the Romantic era fewer works are known. Finally, there are some 20th- and 21st-century examples, of which the concerto by Francis Poulenc has entered the basic repertoire, and is quite frequently played.

Some works for organ and orchestra which clearly feature the organ in a solo, virtuoso role are not given the name concerto, e.g. the Symphonie concertante of Joseph Jongen.

However, the organ concerto form does not include certain orchestral works that call for the pipe organ to be used as an extra orchestral section, such as the Third Symphony of Camille Saint-Saëns, Gustav Holst's The Planets and Richard Strauss's Also sprach Zarathustra.

In general, the term organ symphony is reserved for works for solo organ without orchestra, although the nickname "Organ Symphony" for the Saint-Saëns Third Symphony persists, though it is neither a concerto nor a true organ symphony.

== Composers of organ concertos ==
=== Antonio Vivaldi (1678–1741) ===
- D minor for violin, organ, strings and basso continuo, RV 541
- F major for violin, organ, strings and basso continuo, RV 542 (doubtful)
- C major for violin, oboe, organ, strings and basso continuo, RV 554 (Rv 554a with cello instead of oboe)
- F major for 2 violins, 2 organs, double string orchestra and basso continuo, RV 584 (incomplete)
- A major for 4 violins, 4 recorders, 3 cellos, organ, double string orchestra and basso continuo, RV 585
- C minor for violin, organ, strings and basso continuo, RV 766 (RV 510 with two violins)
- F major for violin, organ, strings and basso continuo, RV 767 (RV 765 with two violins)
- C major for violin, organ, strings and basso continuo, RV 774 (incomplete)
- F major for violin, organ, strings and basso continuo, RV 775 (incomplete)
- C major for violin, organ, strings and basso continuo, RV 808

=== George Frideric Handel (1685–1759) ===
Handel wrote organ concertos as interludes for his oratorios—playing the organ part himself while directing the orchestra. Some are arrangements of his earlier works, or of works by other composers. For more details see the list of Handel's concertos. Many alternatives exist, so it is difficult to precisely number his organ concertos, however it is generally accepted that he wrote 16:

1. HWV 289 – Op. 4 No. 1 in G minor: larghetto, allegro, adagio, andante
2. HWV 290 – Op. 4 No. 2 in B♭ major: tempo ordinario, allegro, adagio, allegro ma non troppo
3. HWV 291 – Op. 4 No. 3 in G minor: adagio, allegro, adagio, allegro
4. HWV 292 – Op. 4 No. 4 in F major: allegro, andante, adagio, allegro
5. HWV 293 – Op. 4 No. 5 in F major: larghetto, allegro, alla siciliana, presto
6. HWV 294 – Op. 4 No. 6 in B♭ major: andante, allegro, larghetto, allegro moderato
7. HWV 306 – Op. 7 No. 1 in B♭ major: andante, allegro, largo, adagio, allegro
8. HWV 307 – Op. 7 No. 2 in A major: overture, tempo ordinario, tempo ordinario II, allegro
9. HWV 308 – Op. 7 No. 3 in B♭ major: allegro, fuga, spiritoso, minuets 1 & 2
10. HWV 309 – Op. 7 No. 4 in D minor: adagio, allegro, adagio, allegro
11. HWV 310 – Op. 7 No. 5 in G minor: allegro ma non troppo, adagio, andante, minuet, gavotte
12. HWV 311 – Op. 7 No. 6 in B♭ major: pomposo, adagio, tempo ordinario
13. HWV 295a – F major (No. 13): largo, allegro, larghetto, allegro
  HWV 295b – second version: larghetto, allegro, larghetto, allegro
14. HWV 296a – A major (No. 14) : largo e staccato, organo ad libitum: fuga – allegro, andante, grave, allegro
  HWV 296b – second version, Pasticcio Konzert: andante, adagio, grave, andante allegro, a tempo ordinario
15. HWV 304 – D minor (No. 15) : andante, organo ad libitum: adagio – fuga, allegro
16. HWV 305a – F major (No. 16) : concerto, allegro, andante, andante allegro
  HWV 305b – second version: overture, allegro, andante, andante allegro

Organ concertos arranged from Concerti Grossi, Op.6

1. HWV 297 – D minor, after HWV 328: overture, air, allegro, allegro, allegro moderato
2. HWV 298 – G major, after HWV 319: a tempo giusto, allegro, adagio, allegro, allegro
3. HWV 299 – D major, after HWV 323 : larghetto e staccato, allegro, presto, largo, allegro, minuet un poco larghetto
4. HWV 300 – G minor, after HWV 324 : largo e affettuoso, a tempo giusto, musette larghetto, allegro, allegro

=== Johann Sebastian Bach (1685–1750) ===
There are no true organ concerti (i.e., for organ and orchestral ensemble) by Bach, but several cantata movements contain extensive obbligato organ parts. Versions of six of these cantata movements had a later incarnation in the two harpsichord concertos BWV 1052 and 1053. Cantata 35 contains two instrumental Sinfonias with organ solo, the first of which agrees with the fragmentary keyboard concerto BWV 1059. A recording of a reconstruction of this as an organ concerto was made by Ton Koopman.

Bach's admiration for Antonio Vivaldi and the Italian style led to several transcriptions of instrumental concertos for solo organ, without an orchestra.

=== Gregor Joseph Werner (1693–1766) ===
The Austrian composer Gregor Joseph Werner wrote a concerto in B♭ major for organ, 2 chalumeaux and string orchestra, dated 1753: Allegro – Largo – Tempo di menuet (manuscript: Országos Széchényi Könyvtár, Budapest: Ms.mus III.305; RISM: 530003636), as well as other concertos for organ and string or chamber orchestra. Besides these he wrote a pastorella in D major for organ and string orchestra: Andante – Larghetto – Allegro.

=== Johann Adolf Hasse (1699–1783) ===
The German composer Johann Adolf Hasse wrote six concertos for organ (or harpsichord) and orchestra, published in London ca 1743.

=== Michel Corrette (1707–1795) ===
The French organist-composer Michel Corrette wrote six concertos.

- Concerto No. 1 in G major: allegro, aria I, aria II, allegro
- Concerto No. 2 in A major: allegro, adagio, allegro
- Concerto No. 3 in D major: adagio, aria, andante, adagio, allegro
- Concerto No. 4 in C major: allegro, aria, allegro
- Concerto No. 5 in F major: allegro, aria, allegro
- Concerto No. 6 in D minor: allegro, andante, presto

=== Marianus Königsperger (1708–1769) ===
The German composer Marianus Königsperger wrote six concertos and two pastorellas for organ and string orchestra, with two trumpets or horns ad libitum, Op. 18 (Certamen musicum complectens VI. concerta communia et II. pastoritia, Augustae-Vindelicorum: sumptibus Joannis Jacobi Lotteri Haeredum, 1754).

=== Georg von Reutter (1708–1772) ===
The Austrian composer Georg von Reutter wrote a concerto in F major for organ (or harpsichord) and string orchestra.

=== Thomas Arne (1710–1778) ===
The English composer Thomas Arne composed six concertos.

- Concerto No. 1 in C major: largo ma con spirito, andante, allegro, minuetto
- Concerto No. 2 in G major: allegro, lento, moderato, allegro, con spirito
- Concerto No. 3 in A major: con spirito, con spirito, minuetto, moderato
- Concerto No. 4 in B♭ major: con spirito, minuetto, giga moderato
- Concerto No. 5 in G minor: largo, allegro con spirito, adagio, vivace
- Concerto No. 6 in B♭ major: allegro, moderato, ad libitum, allegro, minuetto

=== Carl Philipp Emanuel Bach (1714–1788) ===
The German composer Carl Philipp Emanuel Bach wrote several concertos for keyboard instrument (organ as one possible option), including the following:

- Concerto in G major for organ (or harpsichord), strings and basso continuo, dated 1755 (Helm 444; Wq. 34): Allegro di molto – Largo – Presto.
- Concerto in E♭ major for organ (or harpsichord), strings and basso continuo, with optional French horns, dated 1759 (Helm 446; Wq. 35): Allegro ma non troppo – Adagio sostenuto – Allegro assai.
- Concerto No. 4 in B♭ major for organ and orchestra: Con spirito – Minuetto – Giga.
- Concerto No. 5 in G minor for organ and orchestra: Largo – Allegro con spirito – Adagio – Vivace.
- Concerto No. 6 in B♭ major for organ and orchestra: Allegro moderato – Minuetto – Variations.

=== Georg Christoph Wagenseil (1715–1777) ===
The Austrian composer Georg Christoph Wagenseil wrote several concertos for organ (or harpsichord) and string orchestra, of which six were published in London in 1761 and another set of six also in London by Welcker ca 1765.

=== Johann Georg Zechner (1716–1778) ===
The Austrian composer Johann Georg Zechner wrote at least four concertos for keyboard instrument and (string) orchestra; either one of them or another work in F major is recorded by Franz Haselböck and Capella Academica Wien, conducted by Eduard Melkus, as an organ concerto: Allegro – Adagio – Presto (Hänssler Classic CD 94.052).

=== Joseph Anton Xaver Auffmann (ca 1720–1773 or later) ===
The German composer Joseph Anton Xaver Auffmann wrote at least three concertos for organ and chamber orchestra, Op. 1 (Triplex concentus organicus, seu III. concerti organici à octo instrumentis, Augustæ-Vindelicorum: sumptibus Joannis Jacobi Lotteri Hæredum, 1754).

=== Antonio Soler (1729–1783) ===
The Spanish composer Antonio Soler wrote six concertos for two organs (without other instruments):

Soler: Concerto No. 1

- Concerto No. 1 in C major: andante, minué
- Concerto No. 2 in A minor: andante-allegro, tempo di minué
- Concerto No. 3 in G: andantino, minué
- Concerto No. 4 in F: afectuoso, andante non largo, minué
- Concerto No. 5 in A: cantabile, minué
- Concerto No. 6 in D: allegro-andante-allegro-andante, minué

=== František Xaver Brixi (1732–1771) ===
The Czech composer František Xaver Brixi wrote at least six concertos for organ (or harpsichord) and chamber orchestra, e.g.:

- Concerto in D major for organ and chamber orchestra (two horns, two violins and bass): Allegro moderato – Adagio – Allegro (manuscript: Universitäts- und Landesbibliothek, Bonn: Ec 252.5; RISM 450.064.567).
- Concerto in D major for organ and chamber orchestra (two trumpets, two oboes, strings, bass, timpani): Allegro molto – Andante molto – Allegro molto (manuscript: Konvent minoritů v Praze, Prague: 16; RISM 551.000.016).

=== Joseph Haydn (1732–1809) ===
The Austrian composer Joseph Haydn wrote at least three concertos for organ:

- Concerto Hob. XVIII:1 in C major for organ (or harpsichord) and orchestra, dated tentatively 1756.
- Concerto Hob. XVIII:2 in D major for organ (or harpsichord) and orchestra, composed no later than 1767.
- Concerto Hob. XVIII:6 in F major for violin and organ (or harpsichord) with string orchestra, composed no later than 1766.

Besides these, several of his keyboard concertos are performed with organ. There are also works attributed him, dubiously or spuriously:

- Concerto Hob. deest in C major for organ and chamber orchestra (2 trumpets, 2 violins, basso continuo), composed no later than 1790–1810: Andante – Presto (manuscript: Slovenské národné múzeum – Hudobné múzeum, Bratislava: MUS XII 42; RISM 570.000.177).

=== Johann Georg Albrechtsberger (1736–1809) ===
The Austrian composer Johann Georg Albrechtsberger wrote a concerto in B♭ major for organ and string orchestra, dated 1762, and published as volume 1 in Musica rinata series (Budapest: Zenemükiadó, 1964).

=== Michael Haydn (1737–1806) ===
The Austrian composer Michael Haydn wrote concerto MH 41 in C major for viola and organ (or harpsichord) with orchestra, dated 19 December 1761 (the year is uncertain).

=== Sir William Herschel (1738–1822) ===
The German-born English astronomer and composer Sir William Herschel wrote at least two concertos for organ and orchestra:

- Concerto no. 1 in G major for organ and orchestra, composed 1767: [no title] – Andante assai – Allegro (manuscript: The British Library, London: MS Mus. 89; RISM 806.451.028).
- Concerto [no. 2?] in D major for organ and string orchestra, composed 1767 (manuscript: The British Library, London).

=== Johann Baptist Waṅhal (1739–1813) ===
The Czech-born Austrian composer Johann Baptist Waṅhal wrote at least nine organ concertos, which are only known from the inventory of the composer's estate. Concerto Bryan F1 in F major for harpsichord or piano and orchestra, composed no later than 1786, is edited and published in 1973 as an organ concerto in Diletto musicale series.

=== Marian Paradeiser (1747–1775) ===
The Austrian composer Marian Paradeiser wrote a concertino for organ (or harpsichord), violin, violoncello and orchestra; a manuscript of this work is kept in the library of the Melk Abbey in Melk, Austria.

=== Antonio Salieri (1750–1825) ===
Italian-born Austrian composer Antonio Salieri wrote an organ concerto in C major in 1773. Manuscript of this work is in the collections of the National Library of Austria. An edition, by J.S. Hettrick, in published in Vienna in 1981.

=== Karel Blažej Kopřiva (1756–1785) ===
The Czech composer Karel Blažej Kopřiva wrote at least eight concertos for organ and orchestra, but only the one in E♭ major for organ and chamber orchestra, with movements Allegro moderato – Adagio – Allegro di giusto, is known to have survived.

=== Wolfgang Amadeus Mozart (1756–1791) ===
The Austrian composer Wolfgang Amadeus Mozart wrote seventeen Church Sonatas. These were meant for liturgical use (i.e. in a church service), rather than concert performance. Eight of these feature the pipe organ in an obbligato solo part.

- No. 7 K. 224 (241a) in F major for organ, two violins, cello and bass (basso continuo), dated 1776
- No. 8 K. 225 (241b) in A major for organ, two violins, cello and bass (basso continuo), dated 1776
- No. 10 K. 244 in F major for organ, two violins, cello and bass (basso continuo), dated April 1776
- No. 11 K. 245 in D major for organ, two violins, cello and bass (basso continuo), dated April 1776
- No. 12 K. 263 in C major for organ, two trumpets, two violins, cello and bass (basso continuo), dated December 1776
- No. 15 K. 328 (317c) in C major for organ, two violins, cello and bass, dated 1779
- No. 16 K. 329 (317a) in C major for organ, two oboes, two horns, two trumpets, two violins, timpani, cello and bass (basso continuo), dated March 1779
- No. 17 K. 336 (336d) in C major for organ, two violins, cello and bass (basso continuo), dated 1780

=== Balthasar Anton Pfeyll (18th century) ===
A Central-European composer Balthasar Anton Pfeyll (Balthasarus Antonius Pfeyll) composed at least one concerto in D major for organ and chamber orchestra (two horns, strings, bass): Allegro [and other movements?] (manuscript: Kloster Einsiedeln, Musikbibliothek, Einsiedeln: 18,19 (Ms.1837); RISM 400012780).

=== Matteo Andruzzi (fl. 1785) ===
The Italian composer Matteo Andruzzi wrote at least one concerto in C major for organ and orchestra (manuscript: Škofijski arhiv, Koper: GA XXI/17; RISM 540.200.227).

=== Skitner ===
An unrecognised Central-European composer called Skitner wrote at last one concerto in D major for organ and chamber orchestra, dated before 1802: Allegro (assai) – Allegro assai (manuscript at the Landesbibliothek Coburg: Ms Mus 374/1.52; RISM 450.107.181; another manuscript: Národní knihovna České republiky, Prague: no sigla; RISM 552.000.678).

=== Josef Gabriel Rheinberger (1839–1901) ===
The Liechtenstein-born German composer Josef Gabriel Rheinberger wrote two concertos for organ and orchestra:

- No. 1 in F major, Op. 137
- No. 2 in G minor, Op. 177

=== Alexandre Guilmant (1837–1911) ===
Félix-Alexandre Guilmant Alexandre Guilmant, wrote two of his organ sonatas in two versions , one as a symphony for organ and orchestra:

- Sonata No. 1 in D minor / Symphonie No. 1 in D minor for organ and orchestra: Introduction et Allegro / Pastorale (Andante quasi allegretto) / Final (Allegro assai)
- Sonata No. 8 in A major / Symphonie No. 2 in A major for organ and orchestra: Introduction et Allegro risoluto / Adagio con affetto / Scherzo: Allegro vivace / Andante sostenuto / Intermède et Allegro con brio

=== Marco Enrico Bossi (1861–1925) ===
- Concerto in A minor, Op. 100, for organ, string orchestra, 4 horns and timpani (Bossi wrote this concerto in two versions, the first in B♭ minor with a different orchestration but with the same opus number)
- Konzertstück in C minor, Op. 130, for organ and orchestra
- Fantasia Sinfonica, Op. 147, for organ and orchestra

=== 20th and 21st centuries ===
- Horatio Parker (1863–1919)
  - Organ Concerto in E♭ minor, Op. 55 (1902)
- Joseph Jongen (1873–1953)
  - Symphonie concertante for organ and orchestra, Op. 81 (1926)
- Marcel Dupré (1886–1971)
  - Concerto in E minor, Op. 31 (1931)
- Hans Gál (1890–1987)
  - Concertino for organ and string orchestra, Op. 55 (1954)
- Hendrik Andriessen (1892–1981)
  - Concerto for organ and orchestra (1950)
- Paul Hindemith (1895–1963)
  - Kammermusik No. 7, concerto for organ and wind band, Op. 46 no. 2 (1927)
  - Concerto for organ and orchestra (1963)
- Howard Hanson (1896–1981)
  - Organ Concerto (1923)
- Francis Poulenc (1899–1963)
  - Concerto for organ in G minor (1938)
- Jón Leifs (1899–1968)
  - Organ concerto, Op. 7 (1930)
- Aaron Copland (1900–1990)
  - Symphony for Organ and Orchestra (1924)
- Flor Peeters (1903–1986)
  - Concerto for Organ and Orchestra, Op. 52
- Normand Lockwood (1906–2002)
  - Concerto for Organ and Brasses
- Jean Langlais (1907–1991)
  - Concerto no. 1 for organ or harpsichord and orchestra (1949)
  - Concerto no. 2 for organ and string orchestra (1961)
  - Concerto no. 3 Réaction for organ, string orchestra and timpani (1971)
- Samuel Barber (1910–1981):
  - Toccata festiva for organ and orchestra, Op. 36
- Anton Schoendlinger (1919–1983)
  - Concerto no. 5 for organ, 3 trumpets, 3 trombones, timpani and string orchestra (1978) (manuscript: Interkulturelles Forschungsprojekt Deutsche Musikkultur im östlichen Europa, Bonn; RISM 458.000.010)
- Sir Malcolm Arnold (1921–2006)
  - Concerto for organ, trumpets (3), timpani and strings
- Arthur Butterworth (1923–2014)
  - Concerto for organ, string orchestra and percussion, Op. 33 (1973)
- Revol Bunin (1924–1976)
  - Concerto in G minor for organ and chamber orchestra, Op. 33 (1961)
- Boris Tchaikovsky (1925–1996)
  - Six etudes for organ and string orchestra (1976)
- Charles Chaynes (1925–2016)
  - Concerto for organ, strings, timpani and percussion after the Spiritual Canticle of St. John of the Cross (1973)
- Einojuhani Rautavaara (1928–2016)
  - Annunciations, concerto for organ, brass quintet, wind orchestra and percussion (1977)
- Kenneth Leighton (1929–1988)
  - Organ Concerto (for organ, strings and timpani), Op. 58 (1970)
- Petr Eben (1929–2007)
  - Organ Concerto No. 1 (1954)
  - Organ Concerto No. 2 (1988)
- William Mathias (1934-1992)
  - Organ Concerto Op. 91 (1983)
- Jean Guillou (1930–2019):
  - Invention for organ and orchestra (concerto no. 1), Op. 7
  - Concerto héroïque for organ and orchestra (concerto no. 2), Op. 10
  - Concerto No. 3 for organ and string orchestra, Op. 14
  - Concerto No. 4 for organ and orchestra, Op. 31
  - Concerto No. 5 Roi Arthur for organ and string quintet, Op. 35
  - Concerto 2000 for organ and orchestra, Op. 62
  - Concerto No. 6 for organ and orchestra (triple woodwind, 4 horns, 2 trumpets, 2 trombones, tuba, percussion, strings), Op. 68
  - Concerto No. 7 for organ and orchestra, Op. 70
- Terry Riley (born 1935)
  - At the Royal Majestic (2013)
- Andrew Carter (1939–2026)
  - Concerto in C major for organ and orchestra (2005)
- Stephen Paulus (1949–2014)
  - Concerto for organ, chorus and orchestra
  - Concerto for organ, strings and percussion (1992)
  - Grand concerto for organ and orchestra (2004)
  - Double concerto for piano and organ with strings and percussion (c. 2010)
- Kalevi Aho (born 1949)
  - Symphony for organ and symphony orchestra (1993)
- Daniel E Gawthrop (born 1949)
  - Concerto for organ and orchestra (premiered 2004)
- Christopher Rouse (1949–2019)
  - Organ Concerto (2014)
- Michael Gandolfi (born 1956):
  - Ascending Light for organ and orchestra (2015)
- Thierry Escaich (born 1965)
  - Concerto no. 1 for organ and orchestra (1995)
  - Concerto no. 2 for organ, string orchestra and percussions (2006)
- Thilo Muster (born 1965)
  - Bachiana balcanica for organ and symphonic orchestra (2023)
- Peter Machajdik (born 1961)
  - Meanders of Dignity for organ and string orchestra (2025)
- Frederik Magle (born 1977)
  - Concerto for organ and orchestra "The Infinite Second" (1994)
- Denis Bédard (born 1950)
  - Concerto pour orgue et orchestre à cordes (2000)
- Eric Sessler (born 1969)
  - Organ Concerto (2006)
- Leonid Karev (born 1969)
  - Mots Interrompus for organ and orchestra (2007)
- Eugenio Maria Fagiani (born 1972)
  - Concerto for organ and string orchestra, Op. 98 (2009)
- Valentin Villard (born 1985)
  - Concerto for organ and string orchestra, Op. 46 (2009)
- Rachel Laurin (1961-2023)
  - Concerto for Organ, String Orchestra and Timpani Op. 59 (2011)
- Bernd Richard Deutsch (born 1977)
  - Okeanos. Concerto for Organ and Orchestra (2014/15)
- Nico Muhly (born 1981)
  - Register (2017)
- Lowell Liebermann (born 1961)
  - Organ Concerto, Op. 141 (2023)

== Sources ==
- Bouquet-Boyer, Marie-Thérèse. Vivaldi et le concerto. Paris: Éditions des Presses Universitaires de France, coll. «Que sais-je ?», 1985.
- Satorius, Richard H. Bibliography of Concertos for Organ and Orchestra. Evanston (IL), The Instrumentalist Co., 1961.
- "Dossier concertos orgue et orchestre" in Orgues Nouvelles No. 5, été 2009. Lyon, June 2009.
