= At the Royal Majestic =

Organ concerto by Terry Riley

At the Royal Majestic is an organ concerto by the American composer Terry Riley. The work was commissioned by the Los Angeles Philharmonic, the Orchestre de la Suisse Romande, and the Deutsches Symphonie-Orchester Berlin. Its world premiere was given by the organist Cameron Carpenter and the Los Angeles Philharmonic under the direction of John Adams at the Walt Disney Concert Hall on April 11, 2014.

== Composition ==
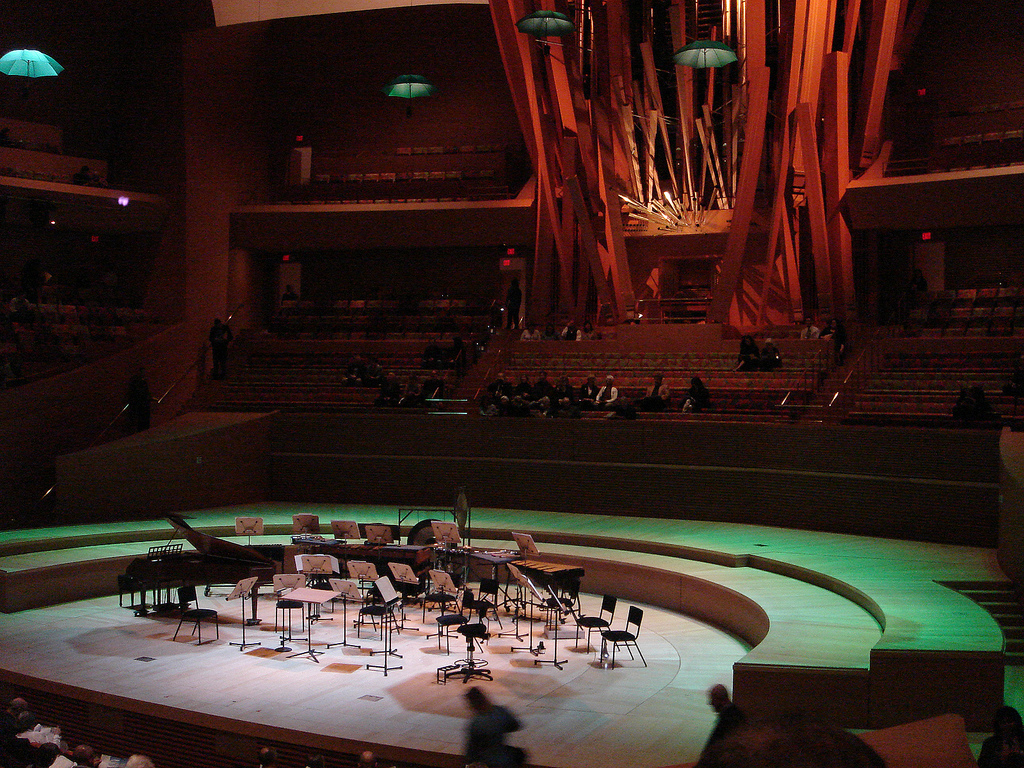
The organ "Hurricane Mama" behind the stage of the Walt Disney Concert Hall

=== Background ===
The Los Angeles Philharmonic first approached Terry Riley in 2008 to compose a piece for their newly installed organ (which Riley named "Hurricane Mama") at the Walt Disney Concert Hall. Riley spent numerous all-night sessions playing Hurricane Mama and composing the piece, which would eventually become 2008's The Universal Bridge. Several unused sketches from these sessions later became the basis for At the Royal Majestic, a Los Angeles Philharmonic co-commission. Riley has had a lifelong interest in the organ and previously featured it in such works as A Rainbow in Curved Air, Persian Surgery Dervishes, The Ten Voices of the Two Prophets, and Shri Camel.

=== Structure ===
At the Royal Majestic has duration of approximately 30 minutes and is cast in three movements:

1. Negro Hall
2. The Lizard Tower Gang
3. Circling Kailash

The first movement "Negro Hall" is the longest and is based on an eponymously titled pencil drawing by the Swiss artist Adolf Wölfli. In the score program notes, Riley wrote, "I was intrigued by what Woelfli, who never traveled outside of Switzerland and who lived the last half of his life in a mental institution, thought about Negro culture. I tried to imagine what a dance hall in the Waldorf Astoria NYC in the 1930s might be like (from Woelfli's perspective), a gaggle of black dancers in outlandish jitterbug and boogie-woogie routines in a polymetric changing tempo frenzy. I used Woelfli's beautifully geometric mandala-like drawings to inspire my own composing process." The movement references themes from the "Negro Hall" section of his 1990 chamber opera The Saint Adolf Ring, which is derived from Wölfli's oeuvre From the Cradle to the Grave.

The second movement "The Lizard Tower Gang" is the shortest movement with a duration of just under 5 minutes.

The final movement "Circling Kailash" refers to the Hindu practice of pilgrims circumambulating the holy Mount Kailash in Tibet, believed to be the residence of the god Shiva.

=== Instrumentation ===
The work is scored for a solo organ and an orchestra consisting of three piccolos, two flutes, alto flute, two bass clarinets, alto saxophone, five bassoons, contrabassoon, two horns, four trumpets, flugelhorn, two trombones, two tubas, timpani, five percussionists, and strings.

== Reception ==
At the Royal Majestic has been praised by music critics. Reviewing the world premiere, Mark Swed of the Los Angeles Times lauded the piece, writing, "Riley has the skill to write down music in the traditional Western classical tradition, but that's never been his preference. He is a collaborator. He is expert in the Indian raga tradition and accomplished in jazz. He has his mind-bending way with musical patterns but also an Ellington side and a ragtime side and a Ravel side and Bartòk. He opens musical windows and welcomes what flies in." He added, "Orchestral colors and musical ideas proceed in Royal Majestic as if in a dream or surrealist narrative. Devoted to fluidity, Riley doesn't like to fill in everything. He left, for instance, the organ's colors up to Carpenter, who played with intense seriousness and exquisite fluidity." The music was also praised by Jim Farber of the San Francisco Classical Voice, who opined, "At the Grand Majestic is a knock-your-socks-off composition that melds many voices, memories, and ideas into a concerto structure. It certainly does not play it safe. But that's Terry Riley."

Conversely, Ivan Hewett of The Daily Telegraph was more critical of the work, remarking, "The composer's own programme note promised a rich imaginative world, embracing the Swiss schizophrenic artist Adolf Wölfi, Tibetan temple music, and black dancers at an imagined dance hall in 1930s New York (thus the concerto's title, At the Royal Majestic). Here and there, the sound-world lived up to that promise, but long before the end the piece became lost in its own labyrinth."
