= Zechner =

Zechner is a surname. Notable people with the surname include:

- Ingo Zechner (born 1972), Austrian philosopher and historian
- Irene Zechner, Austrian luger
- Johann Georg Zechner (1716–1778), Austrian composer
- Michael Zechner (born 1975), Austrian footballer
- Olivia Zechner (born 1981), Austrian pilot

== See also ==
- Lechner
- Zeichner
