= Manuel Pfeifer (politician) =

Austrian politician (born 1991)

Member of the National Council
- Incumbent
- Assumed office 24 October 2024
- Constituency: East Styria

Personal details
- Born: 15 October 1991 (age 34)
- Party: Freedom Party

Manuel Pfeifer (born 15 October 1991) is an Austrian politician of the Freedom Party serving as a member of the National Council since 2024. He has been a city councillor of Birkfeld since 2010.
