= K245 =

K245 or K-245 may refer to:

- K-245 (Kansas highway), a former state highway in Kansas
- HMCS Fredericton (K245), a former Canadian Royal Navy ship
- K.245 Church Sonata No. 11 in D (1776) by Mozart
