= K263 =

K263 or K-263 may refer to:

- K-263 (Kansas highway), a former state highway in Kansas
- K263, a South Korean armored personnel carrier
- K.263 Church Sonata No. 12 in C (1776) by Mozart
