= Zeichner =

Zeichner is a surname. Notable people with the surname include:

- Daniel Zeichner (born 1956), English politician
- Kenneth Zeichner, American educationist

== See also ==
- Zechner
