= Walter Rauch =

Austrian politician

Member of the National Council
- Incumbent
- Assumed office 29 October 2013
- Constituency: East Styria

Personal details
- Born: 7 February 1978 (age 48)
- Party: Freedom Party of Austria

Walter Rauch (born 7 February 1978) is an Austrian politician who has been a Member of the National Council for the Freedom Party of Austria (FPÖ) since 2013.
