= Gleisdorf =

- Municipality
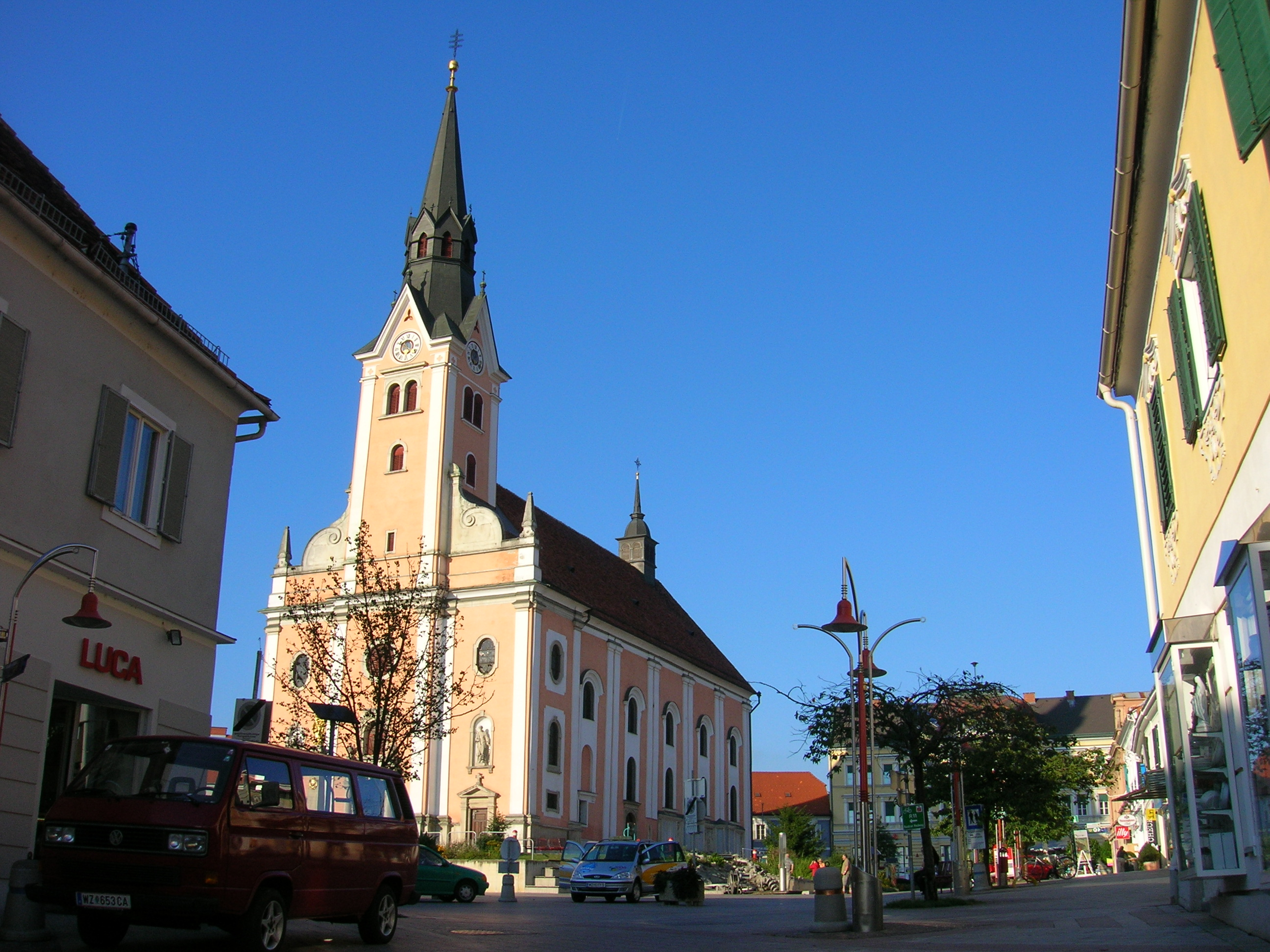

- Coat of arms

- Location within Austria
- Coordinates: 47°06′14″N 15°42′30″E
- Country: Austria
- State: Styria
- District: Weiz

Government
  - Mayor: Christoph Stark (ÖVP)

Area
  - Total: 38.81 km^{2} (14.98 sq mi)
- Elevation: 365 m (1,198 ft)

Population (2022)
  - Total: 11,200
  - Density: 289/km^{2} (747/sq mi)
- Time zone: UTC+1 (CET)
  - Summer (DST): UTC+2 (CEST)
- Postal code: A-8200
- Area code: +43 3112
- Website: www.gleisdorf.at

Gleisdorf is a town in the district of Weiz in the Austrian state of Styria. As of 2023, the town had a population of 11,362.

== Geography ==
Gleisdorf lies about 25 km (16 mi) east of Graz in the valley of the Raab. There is a train station in the south west of the town, with trains running towards Graz and Feldbach.

== Sister cities ==
- Winterbach im Remstal (near Stuttgart, since 1961)
- Nagykanizsa (Hungary)

== Notable people ==
- Johann Georg Zechner (1716–1778), Austrian composer
- Karl Taus (1893-1977), an Austrian Nazi and SS Brigadeführer
- Harald Ettl (born 1947), politician (SPÖ) and an MEP from 1996 to 2009.

=== Sport ===
- Richard Niederbacher (born 1961), Austrian former footballer, played over 370 games
- Paul Gartler (born 1997), football goalkeeper, has played over 100 games
- Philipp Seidl (born 1997), an Austrian footballer who has played over 120 games
