= Stefano Scodanibbio =

Italian composer

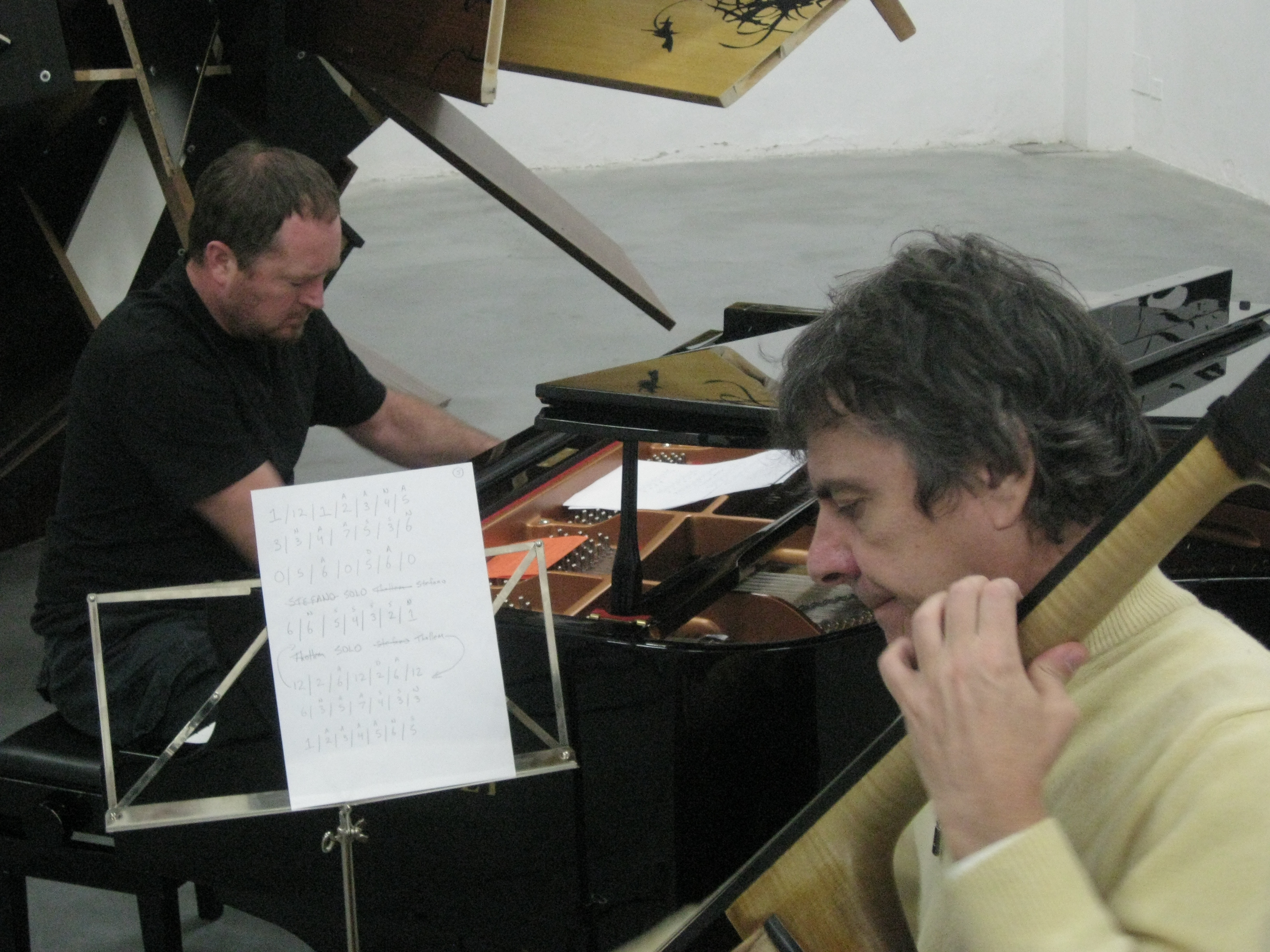
Thollem McDonas and Stefano Scodanibbio perform Thollem's collaborative score at the Sincronie Festival Milano, Italy – 1 December 2009

Stefano Scodanibbio (18 June 1956 – 8 January 2012) was an Italian musician who reached international prominence as a double bassist and composer.

== Biography ==
Scodanibbio was born in Macerata. He studied double bass with Fernando Grillo and composition with Fausto Razzi and Salvatore Sciarrino. From an early age he was interested in the double bass as a solo instrument and in promoting new trends in contemporary European and American music. In 1983 he founded the Rassegna di Nuova Musica in Macerata. He has been described as "a tremendous bassist, a fearless improviser, and a gifted composer".

The many composers who have written for him include Brian Ferneyhough, Salvatore Sciarrino, Sylvano Bussotti, Iannis Xenakis, Fernando Mencherini, Gérard Grisey, Roberto Paci Dalò, Giacinto Scelsi, Julio Estrada. He worked for a long period with Luigi Nono.

He worked closely with the musician Terry Riley, as well as with choreographers and dancers such as Virgilio Sieni, Patricia Kuypers, Hervé Diasnas, the poets Edoardo Sanguineti and Gian Ruggero Manzoni, the philosopher Giorgio Agamben, the artist Gianni Dessì and the director and playwright Rodrigo Garcia. He played regularly with Rohan de Saram and Markus Stockhausen.

From the 1990s he taught master classes and seminars at the Shepherd School of Music at Rice University, University of California Berkeley, Stanford University, Oberlin Conservatory, Musikhochschule Stuttgart, Conservatoire de Paris, Milan Conservatory, etc. In 1996 he taught double bass at Darmstadt Ferienkurse.

Stefano Scodanibbio chose to spend the final chapter of his life in Cuernavaca, Mexico – a country he deeply cherished and had visited regularly for over three decades. Diagnosed with amyotrophic lateral sclerosis in 2010, he made the decision to settle in Mexico, a place he considered a second home. As composer Ana Lara noted, "He decided to come to die here because he was in love with Mexico, a country he had visited every year for at least thirty years". He died in Cuernavaca on 8 January 2012, aged 55.

== Discography ==
- 1997 – Lazy Afternoon among the Crocodiles – Terry Riley & Stefano Scodanibbio (Pierrot Lunaire)
- 1998 – Voyage That Never Ends (New Albion)
- 1998 – One says Mexico
- 1999 – Postkarten – Stefano Scodanibbio & Edoardo Sanguineti
- 2000 – Geografia amorosa
- 2001 – Six Duos (New Albion)
- 2001 – Visas per Vittorio Reta
- 2004 – My new address (Stradivarius)
- 2005 – Diamond Fiddle Language – Terry Riley & Stefano Scodanibbio (Magonza/Wergo)
- 2006 – Visas per Vittorio Reta – (Le Lettere, Florence)
- 2010 – On Debussy's Piano And... – Thollem/Scodanibbio (die Schachtel)
- 2010 – Oltracuidansa (Mode Records, New York)
- 2013 – Reinventions – Quartetto Prometeo (ECM records)
- 2017 – Bass Duo (with William Parker), Centering Records; recorded Udin&Jazz 2008 Festival in Udine, Italy
- 2022 – String Quartets (Kairos)
