= Christian Schandor =

Austrian politician (born 1974)

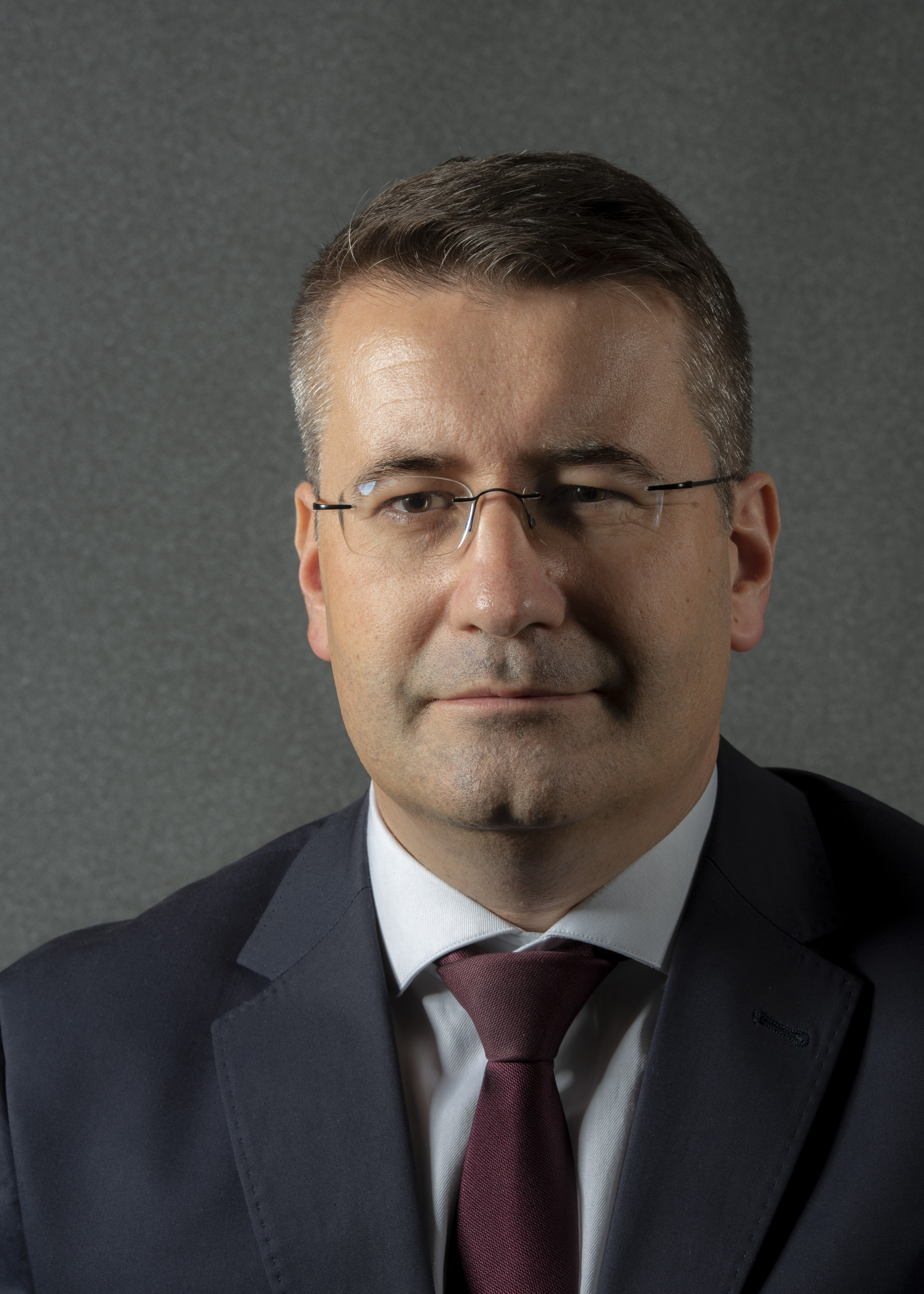
- Schandor in 2018

Member of the National Council
- Incumbent
- Assumed office 24 October 2024
- Constituency: East Styria
- In office 9 November 2017 – 22 October 2019
- Constituency: East Styria

Personal details
- Born: 14 September 1974 (age 51)
- Party: Freedom Party

Christian Schandor (born 14 September 1974) is an Austrian politician of the Freedom Party. He has been a member of the National Council since 2024, having previously served from 2017 to 2019. Since 2015, he has been a city councillor of Fürstenfeld.
