= Agnes Totter =

Austrian politician (born 1974)

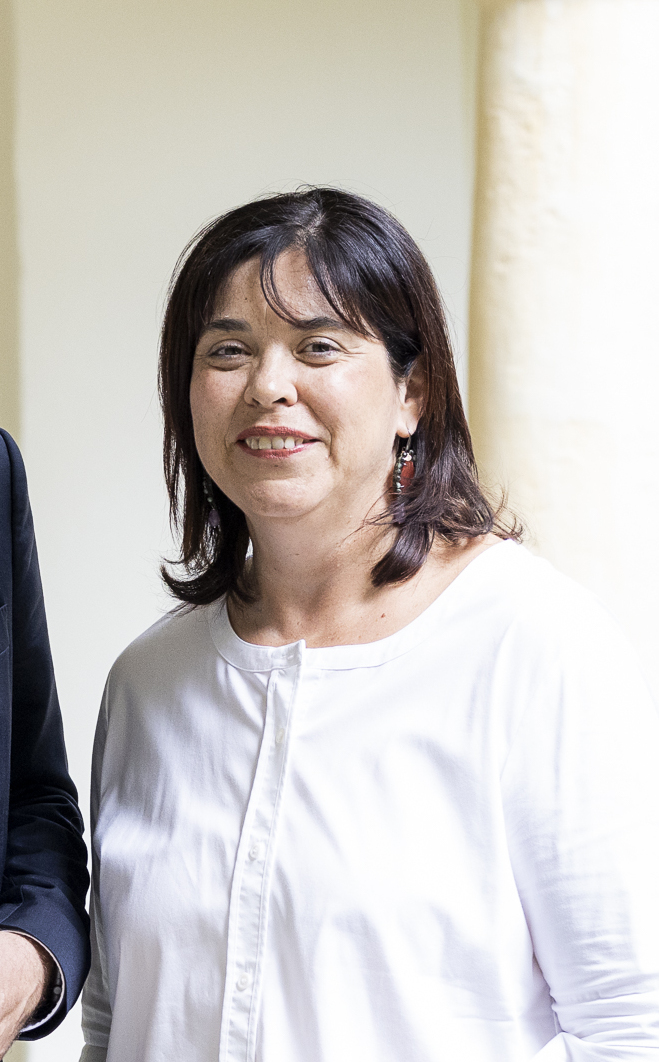
- Agnes Totter

Member of the National Council
- Incumbent
- Assumed office 23 October 2019
- Constituency: East Styria

Personal details
- Born: 27 May 1974 (age 51)
- Party: People's Party

Agnes Totter (born 27 May 1974) is an Austrian politician of the People's Party serving as a member of the National Council since 2019. She is the executive chairwoman of Lehrerbund Steiermark.
