= Organ Concerto (Bédard) =

Organ concerto composed by Francis Poulenc

Concerto pour orgue et orchestre à cordes Organ Concerto
- by Denis Bédard
- Composed: 2000
- Movements: 5
- Scoring: organ; string orchestra

The Concerto pour orgue et orchestre à cordes is an organ concerto with string orchestra in five movements composed by the Canadian Denis Bédard.

== History ==
The Canadian composer, organist and academic teacher Denis Bédard wrote his concerto for organ and string orchestra in five movements on a commission by a joint convention in Quebec in July 2000 of the Fédération quebecoise des Amis de l'orgue and the Royal Canadian College of Organists. It was published by Éditions Cheldar.

He structured it in five movements:

1. Overture
2. Ècho
3. Caprice
4. Chant mystique
5. Final
