= Christoph Stark (politician) =

Austrian politician (born 1967)

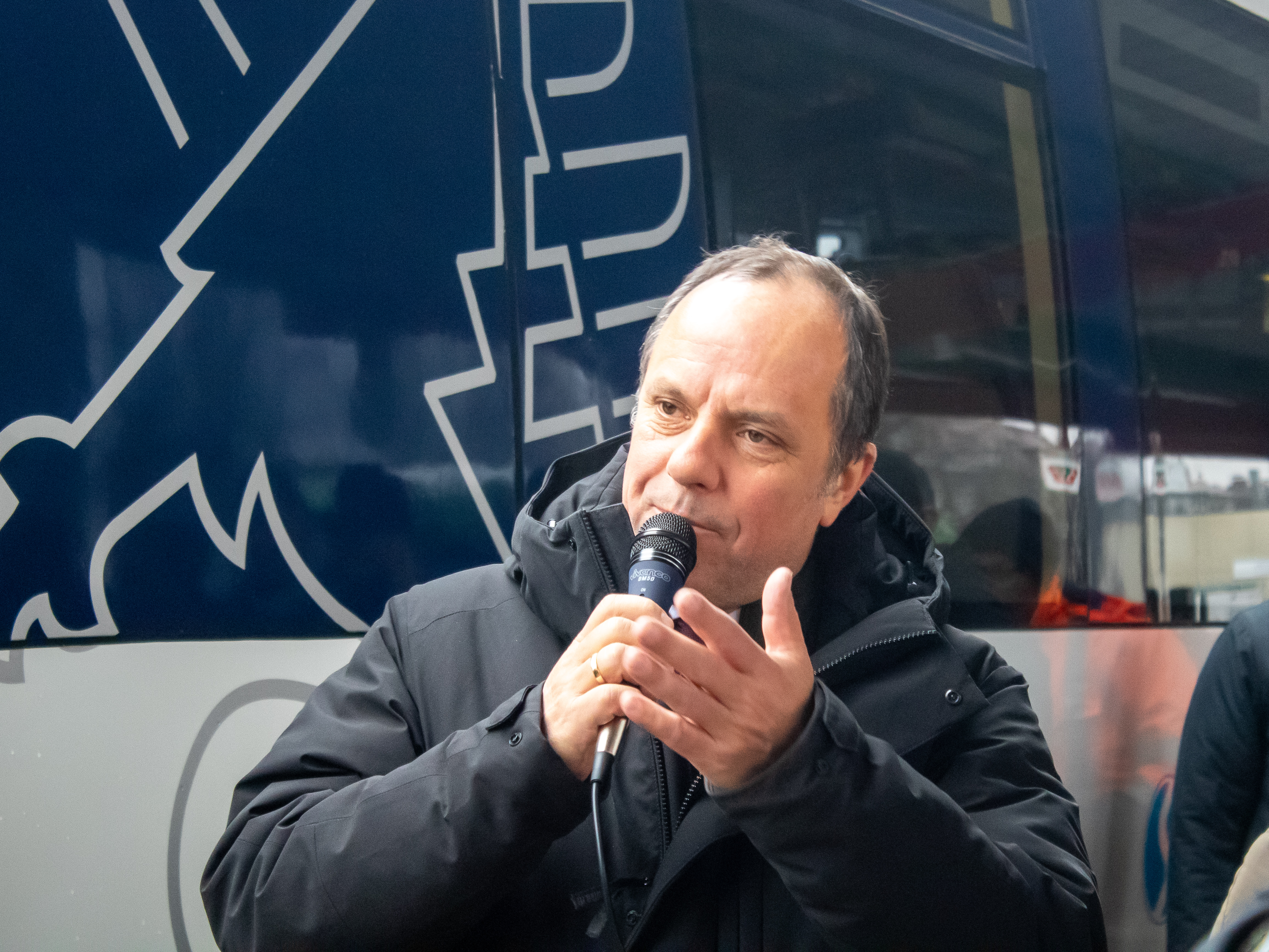
- Stark in 2024

Member of the National Council
- Incumbent
- Assumed office 9 November 2017
- Constituency: East Styria

Personal details
- Born: 1 April 1967 (age 59)
- Party: People's Party

Christoph Stark (born 1 April 1967) is an Austrian politician of the People's Party serving as a member of the National Council since 2017. Since 2000, he served as mayor of Gleisdorf.
