= Lazy Afternoon Among the Crocodiles =

Studio album by Terry Riley and Stefano Scodanibbio
- Released: 1997
- Genre: Experimental music Western classical music Minimalist music Electronic music
- Length: 25:46
- Label: I Dischi Di Angelica – AIAI 008
- Producer: Pierrot Lunaire

Lazy Afternoon Among the Crocodiles is an album that experimental music and classical minimalism pioneer Terry Riley, and contrabassist Stefano Scodanibbio, recorded in 1997.

== Track listing ==
1. "Lazy Afternoon Among the Crocodiles" – 5:53
2. "En la Siesta el Gladiator" - 4:53
3. "Orfeo" - 15:40
