= Karl Taus =

SS and Police Leader and SS-Brigadeführer

- Born: 24 September 1893; Gleisdorf, Archduchy of Austria, Austria-Hungary
- Died: 19 November 1977 (age 84); Leoben, Styria, Austria
- Military career
- Allegiance: Austria-Hungary; Nazi Germany
- Branch: Austro-Hungarian Army; Schutzstaffel
- Service years: 1914–1919; 1930–1945
- Rank: SS-Brigadeführer
- Commands: SS and Police Leader, "Görz"
- Conflicts: World War I World War II
- Awards: Blood Order

Karl Taus (24 September 1893 – 19 November 1977) was an Austrian Nazi and SS-Brigadeführer. During the Second World War, he served as the SS and Police Leader in Görz (today, Gorizia).

== Early life ==
Taus was born in Gleisdorf and attended school there. He completed an apprenticeship as a typesetter and worked at this trade until joining the Austro-Hungarian Army in 1914 after the outbreak of the First World War. He served on the Italian front with a machine gun platoon in Gebirgsjäger Regiment 1 until he was captured. Remaining a prisoner of war through the end of hostilities, he was discharged from the army in 1919 with the rank of Korporal and returned to civilian life as a typesetter, working in Switzerland and France for a time.

== Peacetime SS career in Austria and Germany ==
After returning to his native land, Taus joined the Nazi Party of Austria on 20 October 1930 (membership number 301,453) and on 27 December 1930 he became a member of the SS (SS number 6,786). He joined the 38th SS-Standarte in Leoben. Commissioned a SS-Sturmführer on 16 February 1932, he led his Sturm until 25 September when he was promoted to SS-Hauptsturmführer and took command of a Sturmbann (battalion). Following two additional promotions, he became the commander of the 38th SS-Standarte on 15 June 1934. After taking part in the failed July Putsch against the Austrian government of Chancellor Engelbert Dollfuss, Taus was imprisoned in a detention camp in Wöllersdorf. He was later awarded the Blood Order for taking part in the coup. After being released under a general amnesty in July 1936, Taus moved to Germany and assisted in administering the Party's relief organization for Austrian SS refugees.

On 18 November 1934, with the SS now banned in Austria, Taus was named commander of SS-Abschnitt (District) VIII of the underground Austrian SS units based in Linz. At the same time he was made commander of the SS-Oberabschnitt (Main District) "Osterreich" with oversight of all underground SS formations in Austria. He would hold these postings until 15 June 1935 and 20 January 1937, respectively, and was succeeded in both by SS-Oberführer Ernst Kaltenbrunner. Taus had in the meantime been promoted to SS-Oberführer on 15 February 1935 and, on 1 October 1937, he took up the position of Stabsführer (Staff Leader) of SS-Oberabschnitt "Nord," based in Stettin, remaining there until the Anschluss with Germany in March 1938.

On 21 March 1938, Taus was assigned to the Concentration Camps Inspectorate under SS-Gruppenführer Theodor Eicke. It was intended that he would train for a position as a concentration camp commandant but, after undergoing training and evaluations at Dachau and Buchenwald, it was concluded that he lacked the severity for such a posting and he was never given a camp command. Eicke assessed Taus on 14 June 1938 thusly: "Taus has completely failed ... It is now absolutely certain that Taus is neither predisposed nor qualified to be used as the responsible SS leader in a concentration camp". On 1 July 1938, Taus was assigned as the Stabsführer in SS-Oberabschnitt "Elbe," headquartered in Dresden. He would officially retain this position through the end of the Nazi regime, though he was assigned elsewhere at times during the war. He advanced in rank to SS-Brigadeführer on 10 September 1939.

== Second World War ==
From April 1942, Taus was deployed to the occupied areas of the Soviet Union to train as an SS and Police Leader (SSPF). He was assigned to the SSPFs "Generalbezirk Lettland", "Dnjepropetrowsk" and "Charkow" but was not given an SSPF command of his own. He was then assigned to the staff of the Supreme SS and Police Leader (HöSSPF) "Ukraine", SS-Obergruppenführer Hans-Adolf Prützmann, in Kiev. There, he served as the staff chief from October 1943 through April 1944. On 1 May 1944, Taus was given the position of SS and Polizeigebietskommandeur (Police Area Commander) in Görz, reporting to SS-Gruppenführer Odilo Globocnik, the Higher SS and Police Leader (HSSPF) of the "Operational Zone of the Adriatic Littoral." During his tenure in Görz, the German hold on the region was fiercely contested by Italian and Slovene partisans. Captured partisans were executed in the inner courtyard of Gorizia Castle. It is estimated that more than fifty persons were killed in this manner, though the exact number is unknown. Taus was the only holder of this post and remained in this command until the end of the war in Europe on 8 May 1945. Not much is known of his postwar life, and he died in Leoben in 1977.

== SS ranks ==
SS ranks
| Rank | Date |
|---|---|
| SS-Sturmführer | 16 February 1932 |
| SS-Hauptsturmführer | 25 September 1932 |
| SS-Sturmbannführer | 9 March 1933 |
| SS-Obersturmbannführer | 9 November 1933 |
| SS-Oberführer | 15 February 1935 |
| SS-Brigadeführer | 10 September 1939 |

== Sources ==
- Graf, Wolfgang (2012). Österreichische SS-Generäle: Himmlers verlässliche Vasallen. Hermagoras-Verlag. ISBN 978-3-7086-0578-4.
- Orth, Karin (2004). Die Konzentrationslager-SS. DTV Deutscher Taschenbuch. ISBN 978-3-423-34085-4.
- Schiffer Publishing Ltd., ed. (2000). SS Officers List: SS-Standartenführer to SS-Oberstgruppenführer (As of 30 January 1942). Schiffer Military History Publishing. ISBN 0-7643-1061-5.
- Yerger, Mark C. (1997). Allgemeine-SS: The Commands, Units and Leaders of the General SS. Schiffer Publishing Ltd. ISBN 0-7643-0145-4.
