= Olivia Zechner =

Austrian pilot

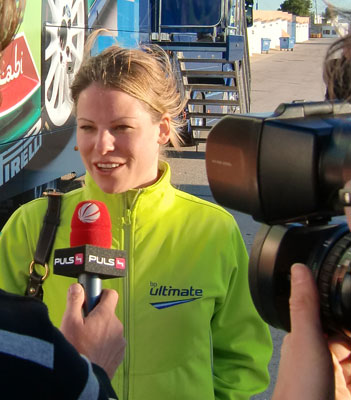
- Born: 29 November 1981 (age 44); Kitzbuhel, Austria
- Height: 1.68 m (5 ft 6 in)
- Aviation career

Racing career
- Best position: 2003 Vize World Champion 2002 European Champion

Olivia Zechner (born 29 November 1981) is an Austrian ultralight pilot who won the European Championship in 2002 in Hungary and was second in the World Championships 2003 in England. As part of the Austrian team she also won Bronze in Hungary, 2002.
