= Shri Camel =

Studio album by Terry Riley
- Released: 1980
- Genres: Minimalism, Indian classical music
- Length: 43:36
- Label: CBS Masterworks
- Producer: Terry Riley

Terry Riley chronology
Descending Moonshine Dervishes	Shri Camel (1980)	Terry Riley: Cadenza on the Night Plain (1984)

Shri Camel is an album by experimental music and classical minimalism pioneer Terry Riley. Riley began composing the work in 1975 on commission from West Germany's Radio Bremen, and performed an early version of the work in Bremen in May 1976. In 1978 Riley recorded a different version of the piece, separated into four suites, at CBS Studios in San Francisco as the final part of a three album deal with CBS; however, CBS did not release the recording until 1980.

For the studio recording, Riley performed the work solo on a modified Yamaha YC-45D combo organ tuned in just intonation and augmented with studio digital delay.

== Critical reception ==
Professional ratings
Review scores
Source	Rating
AllMusic	4/5 stars
DownBeat	5/5 stars

In 1995, The Independent wrote: "The popularity of In C has obscured the very real achievement of, for example, Shri Camel, another keyboard improvisation but one that developed movable rather than merely repeating patterns, a stronger melodic profile and more adventurous harmony, including the use of just intonation."

== Track listing ==
1. "Anthem of the Trinity" – 9:25
2. "Celestial Valley" - 11:32
3. "Across the Lake of the Ancient World" - 7:26
4. "Desert of Ice" - 15:13
