= Denis Bédard =

Canadian composer

Denis Bédard FRCCO (hon. causa), FRSCM (hon. causa)
- Born: 13 January 1950 (age 76); Quebec City, Quebec, Canada
- Occupation: Organist
- Years active: 1969–2021
- Known for: Compositions for organ

Denis Bédard (born 13 January 1950) is a Canadian composer of organ works (solo, duet, and with other instruments) and choral pieces (a cappella, with organ, and with piano). He founded Éditions Cheldar, which publishes his works. His compositions are performed internationally.

== Early life and education ==
Bédard was born in Quebec City, Quebec. He was trained at the Conservatoire de musique du Québec à Québec where he obtained a deuxième prix harmony in 1966, a premier prix counterpoint in 1970, a premier prix for fugue in 1971, premier prix for organ in 1972, and a premier prix for harpsichord and premier prix chamber music in 1973. Among his teachers at the conservatoire were Tania Krieger (piano), Claude Lavoie (organ), André Mérineau (harmony), Magdeleine Martin (counterpoint and fugue), and Donald Thomson (harpsichord). A series of grants from the Canada Council enabled him to pursue studies in Paris with André Isoir (organ) and Laurence Boulay (harpsichord and figured bass realization) and in Montreal with Bernard Lagacé (organ and harpsichord) between 1973 and 1975. After winning the Prix d'Europe in 1975 for his harpsichord performance, he studied piano, harpsichord, and organ with Gustav Leonhardt in the Netherlands from 1975 to 1977.

== Career ==
Beginning in 1969, Bédard served as organist at Church of Notre-Dame de la Nativité in Beauport, Quebec. In 1978 he became the organist at the Church of Saint-Coeur-de-Marie in Quebec City. He played at several other churches in Quebec, and composed music for organ, piano and harpsichord and other instruments.

Bédard's composition Suite from the year 1996 was intended to be played by two organists. A collection of his works for organ was released as an album, Denis Bédard: Organ Works, was released through the Atma label in 1998. In 1999 he composed Duet Suite for Organ and Piano.

Bédard later moved to the west coast and became organist at Notre-Dame-du-Rosaire de Vancouver. He retired from this position in 2021, after exactly 20 years of playing at the cathedral.

In 2018 his composition "Gibraltar March for Organ" was performed in Gibraltar at Holy Trinity Cathedral at the rededication of its 138 year old organ.

== Selected compositions ==
- Suite from the year 1996
- Duet Suite for Organ and Piano (1999)
- Concerto pour orgue et orchestre à cordes (2000)
- Suite pour Orgue
- Suite du premier ton.
- "Fantaisie"
- "Gibraltar March for Organ" (2018)
