= East Styria (National Council electoral district) =

Parliamentary electoral district in Austria

- Oststeiermark
- Electoral District for the National Council
- Location of East Styria within Austria
- District: List: Hartberg-Fürstenfeld; South East Styria; Weiz
- State: Styria
- Population: 267,565 (2024)
- Electorate: 217,383 (2019)
- Area: 3,305 km^{2} (2023)

Current Electoral District
- Created: 2013
- Seats: 6 (2013–present)
- Members: List: Kerstin Fladerer (ÖVP); Walter Rauch (FPÖ); Christoph Stark (ÖVP); Agnes Totter (ÖVP)
- Created from: List: Styria East; Styria South East

East Styria (German: Oststeiermark), also known as Electoral District 6B (German: Wahlkreis 6B), is one of the 39 multi-member regional electoral districts of the National Council, the lower house of the Austrian Parliament, the national legislature of Austria. The electoral district was established in 2012 by the merger of Styria East and Styria South East following the re-organisation of the regional electoral districts in Styria to reflect the new administrative district structure and came into being at the following legislative election in 2013. It consists of the districts of Hartberg-Fürstenfeld, South East Styria and Weiz in the state of Styria. The electoral district currently elects six of the 183 members of the National Council using the open party-list proportional representation electoral system. At the 2019 legislative election the constituency had 217,383 registered electors.

== History ==
East Styria was established in 2012 by the merger of Styria East and Styria South East following the re-organisation of the regional electoral districts in Styria to reflect the new administrative district structure. It consisted of the districts of Hartberg-Fürstenfeld, South East Styria and Weiz in the state of Styria. The district was initially allocated six seats in April 2013.

== Electoral system ==
East Styria currently elects six of the 183 members of the National Council using the open party-list proportional representation electoral system. The allocation of seats is carried out in three stages. In the first stage, seats are allocated to parties (lists) at the regional level using a state-wide Hare quota (wahlzahl) (valid votes in the state divided by the number of seats in the state). In the second stage, seats are allocated to parties at the state/provincial level using the state-wide Hare quota (any seats won by the party at the regional stage are subtracted from the party's state seats). In the third and final stage, seats are allocated to parties at the federal/national level using the D'Hondt method (any seats won by the party at the regional and state stages are subtracted from the party's federal seats). Only parties that reach the 4% national threshold, or have won a seat at the regional stage, compete for seats at the state and federal stages.

Electors may cast one preferential vote for individual candidates at the regional, state and federal levels. Split-ticket voting (panachage), or voting for more than one candidate at each level, is not permitted and will result in the ballot paper being invalidated. At the regional level, candidates must receive preferential votes amounting to at least 14% of the valid votes cast for their party to over-ride the order of the party list (10% and 7% respectively for the state and federal levels).

== Election results ==
=== Summary ===
Election	Communists KPÖ+ / KPÖ			Social Democrats SPÖ			Greens GRÜNE			NEOS NEOS			People's ÖVP			Freedom FPÖ		
Election	Votes	%	Seats	Votes	%	Seats	Votes	%	Seats	Votes	%	Seats	Votes	%	Seats	Votes	%	Seats
2019	1,106	0.67%	0	22,422	13.57%	0	15,157	9.18%	0	9,013	5.46%	0	79,887	48.36%	3	35,216	21.32%	1
2017	874	0.49%	0	31,150	17.63%	1	3,540	2.00%	0	7,059	4.00%	0	68,912	39.00%	2	58,476	33.10%	2
2013	1,512	0.89%	0	29,801	17.62%	1	12,798	7.57%	0	4,680	2.77%	0	49,312	29.16%	1	40,757	24.10%	1

=== Detailed ===
==== 2019 ====
Results of the 2019 legislative election held on 29 September 2019:

Party		Votes per district				Total votes	%	Seats
Party		Hart- berg- Fürst- enfeld	South East Styria	Weiz	Voting card	Total votes	%	Seats
Austrian People's Party	ÖVP	28,611	26,772	24,400	104	79,887	48.36%	3
Freedom Party of Austria	FPÖ	12,583	11,631	10,940	62	35,216	21.32%	1
Social Democratic Party of Austria	SPÖ	7,196	6,204	8,985	37	22,422	13.57%	0
The Greens – The Green Alternative	GRÜNE	4,963	3,941	6,146	107	15,157	9.18%	0
NEOS – The New Austria and Liberal Forum	NEOS	2,947	2,738	3,276	52	9,013	5.46%	0
JETZT	JETZT	596	556	678	19	1,849	1.12%	0
KPÖ Plus	KPÖ+	285	324	493	4	1,106	0.67%	0
Der Wandel	WANDL	180	140	212	6	538	0.33%	0
Valid Votes		57,361	52,306	55,130	391	165,188	100.00%	4
Rejected Votes		663	562	669	5	1,899	1.14%	
Total Polled		58,024	52,868	55,799	396	167,087	76.86%	
Registered Electors		74,303	70,451	72,629		217,383		
Turnout		78.09%	75.04%	76.83%		76.86%		

The following candidates were elected:

- Party mandates - Reinhold Lopatka (ÖVP), 2,424 votes; Walter Rauch (FPÖ), 1,870 votes; Christoph Stark (ÖVP), 7,270 votes; and Agnes Totter (ÖVP), 1,778 votes.

Substitutions:

- Reinhold Lopatka (ÖVP) resigned on 2 July 2024 and was replaced by Kerstin Fladerer (ÖVP) on 3 July 2024.

==== 2017 ====
Results of the 2017 legislative election held on 15 October 2017:

Party		Votes per district				Total votes	%	Seats
Party		Hart- berg- Fürst- enfeld	South East Styria	Weiz	Voting card	Total votes	%	Seats
Austrian People's Party	ÖVP	24,319	23,295	21,173	125	68,912	39.00%	2
Freedom Party of Austria	FPÖ	20,766	19,136	18,476	98	58,476	33.10%	2
Social Democratic Party of Austria	SPÖ	10,178	8,776	12,087	109	31,150	17.63%	1
NEOS – The New Austria and Liberal Forum	NEOS	2,309	2,090	2,618	42	7,059	4.00%	0
Peter Pilz List	PILZ	1,481	1,237	1,654	34	4,406	2.49%	0
The Greens – The Green Alternative	GRÜNE	1,132	974	1,406	28	3,540	2.00%	0
My Vote Counts!	GILT	453	428	619	9	1,509	0.85%	0
Communist Party of Austria	KPÖ	247	257	363	7	874	0.49%	0
Free List Austria	FLÖ	170	158	138	0	466	0.26%	0
The Whites	WEIßE	93	109	81	2	285	0.16%	0
Valid Votes		61,148	56,460	58,615	454	176,677	100.00%	5
Rejected Votes		609	493	504	0	1,606	0.90%	
Total Polled		61,757	56,953	59,119	454	178,283	81.89%	
Registered Electors		74,366	70,779	72,553		217,698		
Turnout		83.04%	80.47%	81.48%		81.89%		

The following candidates were elected:

- Personal mandates - Christoph Stark (ÖVP), 9,914 votes.
- Party mandates - Klaus Uwe Feichtinger (SPÖ), 1,399 votes; Reinhold Lopatka (ÖVP), 6,217 votes; Walter Rauch (FPÖ), 2,631 votes; and Christian Schandor (FPÖ), 790 votes.

==== 2013 ====
Results of the 2013 legislative election held on 29 September 2013:

Party		Votes per district				Total votes	%	Seats
Party		Hart- berg- Fürst- enfeld	South East Styria	Weiz	Voting card	Total votes	%	Seats
Austrian People's Party	ÖVP	18,505	17,774	12,957	76	49,312	29.16%	1
Freedom Party of Austria	FPÖ	13,501	14,088	13,116	52	40,757	24.10%	1
Social Democratic Party of Austria	SPÖ	10,106	9,111	10,526	58	29,801	17.62%	1
Team Stronach	FRANK	6,950	6,994	8,709	30	22,683	13.41%	0
The Greens – The Green Alternative	GRÜNE	3,956	3,532	5,238	72	12,798	7.57%	0
Alliance for the Future of Austria	BZÖ	2,052	1,930	1,941	14	5,937	3.51%	0
NEOS – The New Austria	NEOS	1,604	1,555	1,481	40	4,680	2.77%	0
Communist Party of Austria	KPÖ	387	444	671	10	1,512	0.89%	0
Pirate Party of Austria	PIRAT	304	277	306	2	889	0.53%	0
Christian Party of Austria	CPÖ	293	261	196	4	754	0.45%	0
Valid Votes		57,658	55,966	55,141	358	169,123	100.00%	3
Rejected Votes		1,030	1,047	954	8	3,039	1.77%	
Total Polled		58,688	57,013	56,095	366	172,162	78.28%	
Registered Electors		73,732	73,883	72,324		219,939		
Turnout		79.60%	77.17%	77.56%		78.28%		

The following candidates were elected:

- Party mandates - Reinhold Lopatka (ÖVP), 4,365 votes; Walter Rauch (FPÖ), 1,812 votes; and Sonja Steßl (SPÖ), 1,977 votes.

Substitutions:

- Sonja Steßl (SPÖ) resigned on 16 December 2013 and was replaced by Klaus Uwe Feichtinger (SPÖ) on 17 December 2013.
- Klaus Uwe Feichtinger (SPÖ) resigned on 18 May 2016 and was replaced by Sonja Steßl (SPÖ) on 19 May 2016.
