= Persian Surgery Dervishes =

Live album by Terry Riley
- Released: 1972
- Recorded: 18 April 1971 and 24 May 1972
- Label: Shandar

Persian Surgery Dervishes is a recording of two live solo electric organ concerts, the first held in Los Angeles on 18 April 1971 and the second in Paris on 24 May 1972, by the avant-garde minimalist composer Terry Riley, following his A Rainbow in Curved Air and In C.

== Background and release ==
The two very different performances of the same composition are meant to show the importance of improvisation in Riley's music. Performance One, Los Angeles, April 18, 1971 starts with a series of low tones and as the improvisation unfolds a buoyant feel grows, spiraling into a series of ecstatic coils. The Parisian concert, Performance Two, Paris, May 24, 1972, conveys a brighter spiraling sonic texture that is more relaxed.

The original double-record version was released by the French label Shandar. There existed also a single-record version, also on Shandar, containing just the Paris concert, which had been sponsored by the Shandar label.

Parts of Persian Surgery Dervishes served as soundtrack for a 1973 French film called La chute d'un corps, that was directed by the French columnist Michel Polac.

Persian Surgery Dervishes has been republished twice: first by Mantra Records, and then by Dunya Records.

== Music ==
On Persian Surgery Dervishes Riley plays a Yamaha electric organ. Andy Beta of Pitchfork explained: "With only an electric organ and Riley’s “time-lag” accumulator (a reel-to-reel that played back loops of his improvisations), Dervishes is four sides of oozing drones, percolating virtuosic soloing, and undulating waves of bliss. It’s layered so as to suggest spellbinding Islamic tile patterns, lava lamp globes, and infinity itself."

== Track listing ==
All music is composed by Terry Riley (electric organ & feedback).

Performance One, Los Angeles, April 18, 1971
No.	Title	Length
1.	"Part 1"	20:45
2.	"Part 2"	22:00

Performance Two, Paris, May 24, 1972
No.	Title	Length
1.	"Part 1"	25:00
2.	"Part 2"	22:45
