= Terry Riley =

American composer and musician (born 1935)

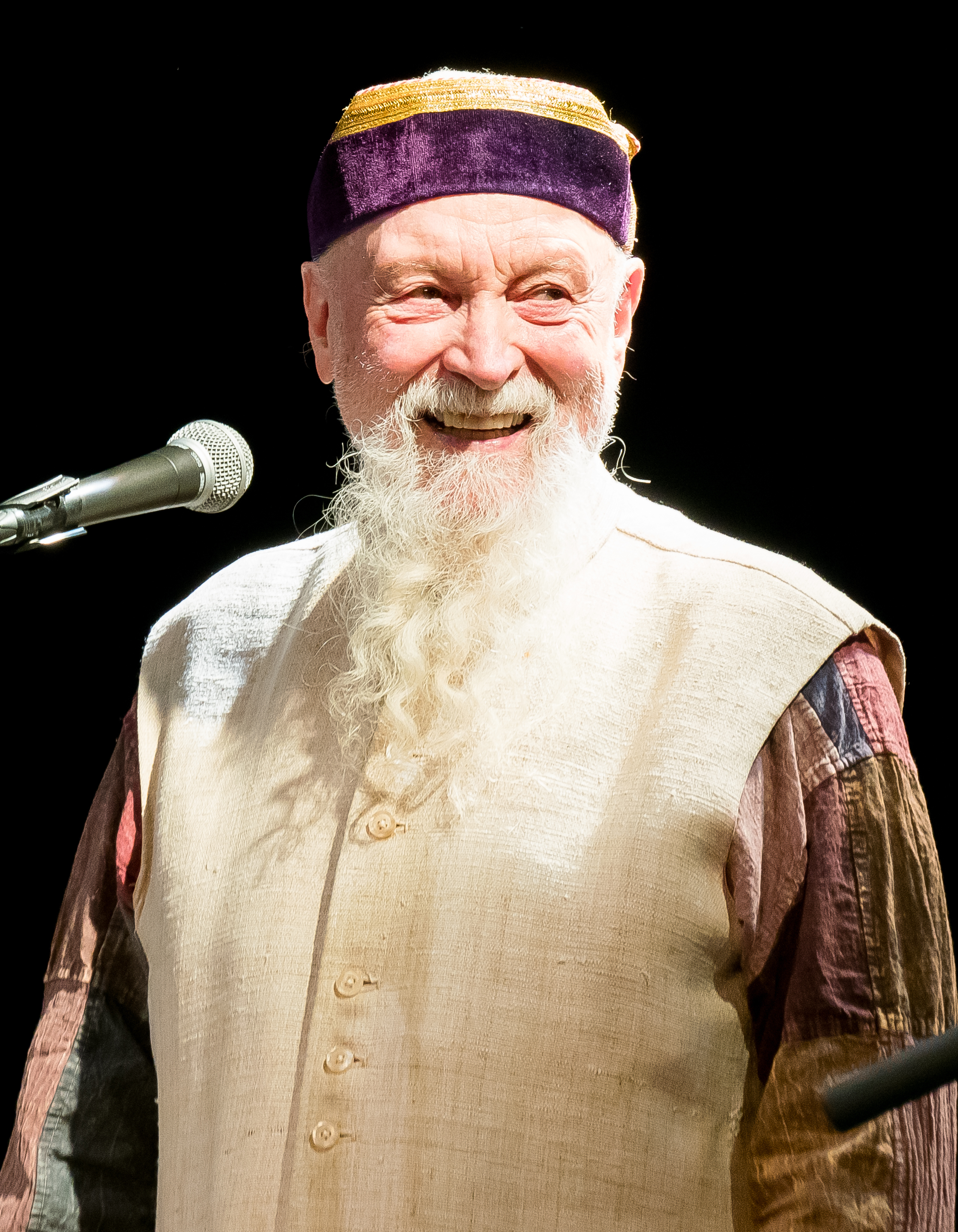
- Terry Riley in 2017

Background information
- Born: Terrence Mitchell Riley; June 24, 1935 (age 90); Colfax, California, US
- Genres: Minimalism; avant-garde; tape; electronic; microtonal; classical
- Instruments: Electric organ; tape machine; saxophone; keyboards; synthesizer; piano; tambura
- Years active: 1950s–present
- Formerly of: Theatre of Eternal Music
- Website: terryriley.net

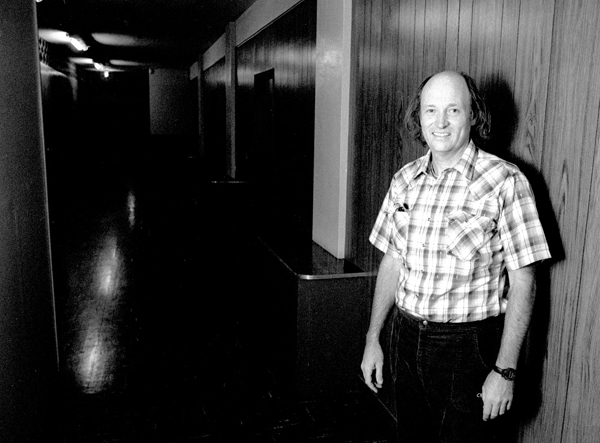
Riley at the Great American Music Hall, San Francisco, 1985

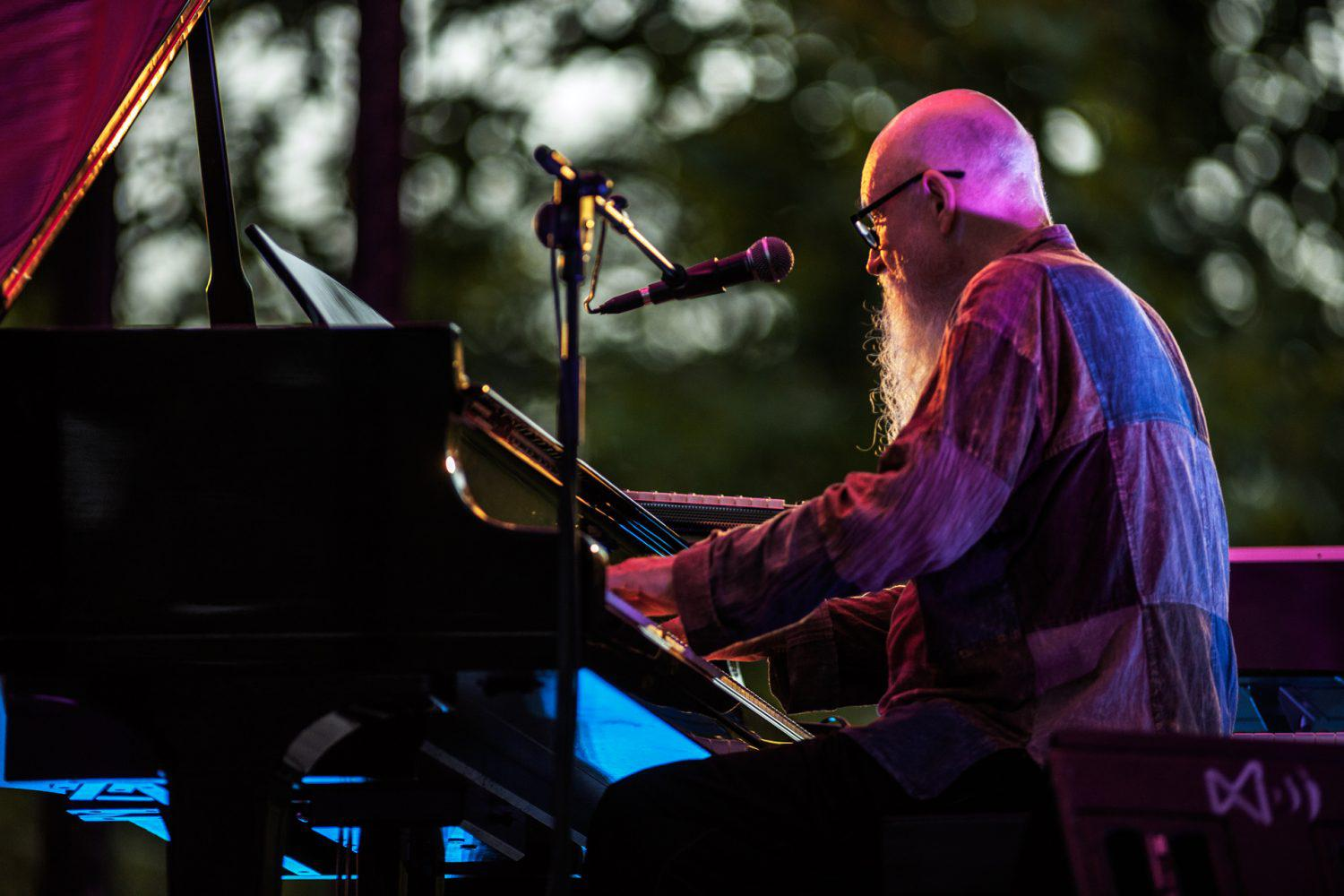
Riley performing in 2018

Terrence Mitchell Riley (born June 24, 1935) is an American composer and performing musician best known as a pioneer of the minimalist school of composition. Influenced by jazz and Indian classical music, his work became notable for its innovative use of repetition, tape delay systems, and improvisation. His best known works are the 1964 composition In C and the 1969 album A Rainbow in Curved Air, both considered landmarks of minimalism and important influences on experimental music, rock, and contemporary electronic music.

Raised in Redding, California, Riley began studying composition and performing solo piano in the 1950s. He befriended and collaborated with composer La Monte Young, and later became involved with both the San Francisco Tape Music Center and Young's New York-based Theatre of Eternal Music. A three-record deal with CBS in the late 1960s brought his work to wider audiences. In 1970, he began intensive studies under Hindustani singer Pandit Pran Nath, whom he often accompanied in performance. Subsequent works such as Shri Camel (1980) explored just intonation. He has collaborated frequently throughout his career, most extensively with chamber ensemble the Kronos Quartet and his son, guitarist Gyan Riley.

== Life ==
Riley was born in Colfax, California on June 24, 1935, and grew up in Redding, California. In the 1950s, he began performing as a solo pianist and studied composition at San Francisco State University, the San Francisco Conservatory, and the University of California, Berkeley, studying with Seymour Shifrin and Robert Erickson. He befriended composer La Monte Young, whose earliest minimalist compositions using sustained tones were an influence; together, Young and Riley performed Riley's improvisatory composition Concert for Two Pianists and Tape Recorders in 1959–60. Riley later became involved in the experimental San Francisco Tape Music Center, working with Morton Subotnick, Steve Reich, Pauline Oliveros, and Ramon Sender. Throughout the 1960s, he also traveled frequently in Europe, taking in musical influences and supporting himself by playing in piano bars. In 1965 he came to New York City and performed for eight months with La Monte Young's Theatre of Eternal Music.

His most influential teacher was Pandit Pran Nath (1918–1996), a master of Indian classical voice who also taught La Monte Young, Marian Zazeela, and Michael Harrison. Riley made numerous trips to India over the course of their association to study and accompany him on tabla, tambura, and voice. In 1971 he joined the Mills College faculty to teach Indian classical music. Riley also cites John Cage and "the really great chamber music groups of John Coltrane and Miles Davis, Charles Mingus, Bill Evans, and Gil Evans" as influences on his work. He was awarded an Honorary Doctorate Degree in Music at Chapman University in 2007.

Around 1980, Riley began his long-lasting association with the Kronos Quartet when he met their founder David Harrington while at Mills. Throughout his career, Riley composed 13 string quartets for the ensemble, in addition to other works. He wrote his first orchestral piece, Jade Palace, in 1991, and has continued to pursue that avenue, with several commissioned orchestral compositions following. He is also currently performing and teaching both as an Indian raga vocalist and as a solo pianist. Riley continues to perform live, and was part of the All Tomorrow's Parties festival in May 2011.

== Artistry ==
=== Musical style ===
"Where American minimalism, Indian classical raga, barrelhouse piano, modal jazz, and rugged western individualism all intersect, there stands the sage composer Terry Riley. [...] His work exploded listeners’ notions of classical composition with his ever-shifting structures and epic improvisations." Riley was initially inspired by jazz saxophonist John Coltrane.

=== Techniques ===
Riley's music is usually based on improvising through a series of modal figures of different lengths. Works such as In C (1964) and the Keyboard Studies (1964–1966) demonstrate this technique. The first performance of In C was given by Steve Reich, Jon Gibson, Pauline Oliveros, and Morton Subotnick, among others. Its form was an innovation: The piece consists of 53 separate modules of roughly one measure apiece, each containing a different musical pattern but each, as the title implies, in the key of C. One performer beats a steady pulse of Cs on the piano to keep tempo. The others, in any number and on any instrument, perform these musical modules following a few loose guidelines, with the different musical modules interlocking in various ways as time goes on.

In the 1950s Riley was already working with tape loops, a technology still in its infancy at the time; he would later, with the help of a sound engineer, create what he called a "time-lag accumulator". He has continued manipulating tapes to musical effect, in the studio and in live performances throughout his career. An early tape loop piece titled Music for the Gift (1963) featured the trumpet playing of Chet Baker. It was during Riley's time in Paris, while composing this piece, that he conceived of and created the time-lag accumulator technique. Premiered in 1968 in the Magic Theatre Exhibition at the Nelson Atkins Gallery in Kansas City, a new version of the installation was commissioned three decades later by Lille 2004-European Capital of Culture and purchased by the Museum of Contemporary Art of Lyon. A third version was built and presented by the Schauspielhaus in Bochum in 2019. He has composed using just intonation as well as microtones. In New York City in the mid-1960s he played with his longtime friend La Monte Young, as well as with John Cale and tabla player Angus MacLise, who were founding members of The Velvet Underground. Riley is credited as inspiring Cale's keyboard part on Lou Reed's composition "All Tomorrow's Parties", which was sung by German actress Nico and included on the album The Velvet Underground and Nico, recorded in 1966.

Riley's famous overdubbed electronic album A Rainbow in Curved Air (recorded 1968, released 1969) inspired many later developments in electronic music. These include Pete Townshend's organ parts on The Who's "Won't Get Fooled Again" and "Baba O'Riley", the latter named in tribute to Riley as well as to Meher Baba. Charles Hazlewood, in his BBC documentary on Minimalism (Part 1) suggests that the album 'Tubular Bells' by Mike Oldfield was also inspired by Riley's example. The English progressive rock group Curved Air, formed in 1970, took its name from the album.

Riley's collaborators have included the Rova Saxophone Quartet, Pauline Oliveros, the ARTE Quartett, and, as mentioned, the Kronos Quartet. His 1995 Lisbon Concert recording features him in a solo piano format, improvising on his own works. In the liner notes Riley cites Art Tatum, Bud Powell and Bill Evans as his piano "heroes", illustrating the importance of jazz to his conceptions.

== Personal life ==
He has three children: one daughter, Colleen, and two sons, Gyan, who is a guitarist, and Shahn. He was married to Ann Riley until her death in 2015. Since 2020, Riley has lived in Yamanashi in Japan.

== Discography ==
- 1963: Music for The Gift (Organ of Corti 1, 1963)
- 1965: Reed Streams, Mass Art Inc. M-131
- 1967: You're No Good, recorded in 1967 but unreleased until 2000 (Cortical Foundation / Organ of Corti, 2000)
- 1968: Germ, with Gérard Frémy & Martine Joste (Spalax CD 14542, 1998). Includes a Pierre Mariétan track.
- 1968: In C, Columbia MS7178
- 1969: A Rainbow in Curved Air, CBS 64564
- 1971: Church of Anthrax, with John Cale (CBS)
- 1972: Happy Ending (soundtrack to Joël Santoni's film Les Yeux Fermés), Warner Bros. Records France 46125; Les Yeux Fermés & Lifespan, for solo electric organ; two soundtracks (2007 reissue)
- 1972: Persian Surgery Dervishes, Shanti 83502
- 1975: Le Secret de la Vie (Lifespan film soundtrack), Philips France 9120 037
- 1975: Descending Moonshine Dervishes, Kuckuck Records
- 1980: Shri Camel, CBS Masterworks M3519, for solo electronic organ tuned in just intonation and modified by digital delay
- 1983: Songs for the Ten Voices of the Two Prophets, for two Prophet 5 synthesisers, Kuckuck Records
- 1984: Terry Riley: Cadenza on the Night Plain, a collaboration with the Kronos Quartet
- 1984: Terry Riley and Krishna Bhatt: Terry Riley and Krishna Bhatt Duo, a collaboration with Krishna Bhatt
- 1985: No Man's Land
- 1986: The Harp of New Albion, for piano tuned in just intonation
- 1987: Chanting the Light of Foresight, with Rova Saxophone Quartet in just intonation
- 1989: Salome Dances for Peace, for the Kronos Quartet
- 1995: In C – 25th Anniversary Concert, version featuring Riley as one of four vocalists, recorded live January 14, 1990, San Francisco, New Albion Records
- 1995: Lisbon Concert, solo piano concert, recorded live July 16, 1995 Festival dos Capuchos, Teatro São Luis, Lisbon, Portugal., New Albion Records
- 1997: Lazy Afternoon Among the Crocodiles, experimental album recorded with contrabassist Stefano Scodanibbio.
- 1998: Piano Music of John Adams and Terry Riley, performed by Gloria Cheng
- 1999: The Book of Abbeyozzud
- 2001: Moscow Conservatory Solo Piano Concert, recording of a live performance on 18 April 2000
- 2001: Terry Riley: Requiem for Adam, with Riley's tribute to the son of David Harrington performed by the Kronos quartet, and a solo piano improvisation by Riley
- 2002: Atlantis Nath, hand-numbered signed edition of 1000 copies
- 2003: Cantos Desiertos (Naxos)
- 2004: I Like Your Eyes Liberty, duets with Terry Riley, piano and Michael McClure, poetry (Sri Moonshine Music)
- 2004: The Cusp of Magic, with the Kronos Quartet, composed for his seventieth birthday, an ode to the rite of Midsummer Eve
- 2005: Diamond Fiddle Language duets with Stefano Scodanibbio, bass (Wergo)
- 2005: Assassin Reverie, Arte Quartett, saxophone qt. (New World Records)
- 2008: Banana Humberto, piano concerto with Paul Dresher Ensemble
- 2008: The Last Camel in Paris, live solo electric organ performance in Paris, 1978
- 2010: Two Early Works, the first-ever recordings of two of Riley's early compositions, performed by the Calder Quartet
- 2010: Autodreamographical Tales (Tzadik Records)
- 2011: Keyboard Studies Nos. 1 and 2 / Tread on the Trail (Stradivarius)
- 2012: Aleph (Tzadik Records)
- 2015: ZOFO Plays Terry Riley, ZOFO piano duo (Sono Luminus)
- 2015: One Earth, One People, One Love: Kronos Plays Terry Riley, Kronos Quartet (Nonesuch Records)
- 2015: Music Of Terry Riley – Sunrise Of The Planetary Dream Collector, Kronos Quartet (Nonesuch Records)
- 2019: Sun Rings, Kronos Quartet (Nonesuch)
- 2019: The Lion's Throne, with singer Amelia Cuni, recorded live (Sri Moonshine Music, SMM008)
- 2019: Archangels, with conductor Julian Wachner, Trinity Choir, Novus Cellos (National Sawdust Tracks)
- 2021: Zephyr, Francesco D'Orazio, violin
- 2022: Autodreamographical Tales, transcriptions and arrangements for the Bang on a Can All-Stars (Cantaloupe Music)
- 2022: Keyboard Studies, John Tilbury (Another Timbre)
- 2022: Organum for Stefano, Terry Riley pipe organ, voice. Basilica di Santa Maria dei Servi, Bologna, Italy, May 7, 2013. (i dischi di angelica)
- 2022: The Sands, James Feddeck, Cleveland Orchestra (CMA Recorded Archive Editions)
- 2023: Standard(S)and: Kobuchizawa Sessions #1 (Star/Rainbow Records)
- 2025: Terry Riley - The Columbia Recordings (Sony Classical)

== Filmography ==
- 1970: Corridor. Film by Standish Lawder.
- 1975: Lifespan. Film by Alexander Whitelaw feat. Klaus Kinski, Tina Aumont and Hiram Keller. Soundtrack released as Le secret de la vie in France, on Philips LP 9120 037 (1975).
- 1976: Crossroads. Film by Bruce Conner.
- 1976: Music with Roots in the Aether: Opera for Television. Tape 6: Terry Riley. Produced and directed by Robert Ashley. New York, New York: Lovely Music.
- 1986: In Between the Notes...a Portrait of Pandit Pran Nath, Master Indian Musician. Produced by Other Minds, directed by William Farley.
- 1995: Musical Outsiders: An American Legacy – Harry Partch, Lou Harrison, and Terry Riley. Directed by Michael Blackwood.
- 2008: "A Rainbow in Curved Air" features in the in-game soundtrack of Grand Theft Auto IV. It can be found when listening to the fictional radio station, "The Journey".
- 2017: Hochelaga, Land of Souls. Film by François Girard.
