= Johann Georg Zechner =

Austrian composer (1716–1778)

Johann Georg Zechner (9 April 1716 – 7 June 1778) was an Austrian composer and organist active in Lower Austria.

== Biography ==
Johann Georg Zechner was born in Gleisdorf on 9 April 1716. He was organist at Göttweig Abbey (1736–43) and choral director at the Pfarrkirche St. Veit in Krems an der Donau (1746–53). He was ordained priest at some time between 1750 and 1752. From 1753 Zechner held a benefice at the Chapel of All Saints at Stein an der Donau, where he produced a large number of sacred and secular music. He was a friend of Johann Georg Albrechtsberger. Zechner died on 7 June 1778 in Stein an der Donau.

Zechner was a prolific composer. His works were widely distributed in the Habsburgian countries and southern Germany. Zechner's music has been preserved in monasteries and churches in Austria as well as Bohemia, Hungary, and southern Germany. His output encompasses many genres of liturgical church music as well as secular songs and instrumental music. The composer's early works show the influence of Johann Joseph Fux and Antonio Caldara while his later works are in a developed early Classical style. Zechner was one of the first to feature solo organ writing in his Missae solemnes.

In 2019 the non-profit Johann Georg Zechner Society in Gleisdorf was founded.
