= Church Sonatas (Mozart) =

Seventeen sonatas by Mozart composed 1772-1780

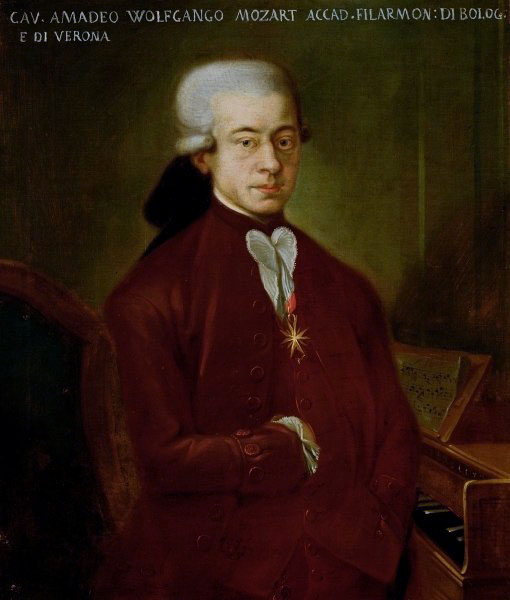
1777 portrait of Mozart

Wolfgang Amadeus Mozart wrote seventeen Church Sonatas (sonate da chiesa), also known as Epistle Sonatas, between 1772 and 1780. These are short single-movement pieces intended to be played during a celebration of the Mass between the Epistle and the Gospel. They were intended to cover the interval during Solemn Mass in which the celebrant, after reading the Epistle, moved from the south side of the choir to the north in order to read the Gospel. Hence the term Sonata all’Epistola (epistle sonata) – a term that appears in one of Mozart's father's letters.

Three of the sonatas (K 263, 278/271e and 329/317a) include more orchestral scoring including oboes, horns, trumpets and timpani and the rest are scored for organ and strings (with no violas). In eight of the sonatas (K 224/241a, 225/241b, 244, 245, 263, 328/317c, 329/317a and 336/336d), the organ has an obbligato solo part and in the other nine, the organ accompanies along with the basso continuo. It is not clear how many players would have been involved in the sonatas scored for two violins, bass and organ. Archival sources from Salzburg Cathedral suggest that two-to-a-part performance was the norm for string players. The fact that in many cases the organ simply provides chords to fill out the texture, together with the chamber-like scoring of many of these sonatas, indicates that they were largely intended for performance on one of the cathedral's small organs. The organ pedals are rarely used, appearing only in K245, 274, 328 and 329.

Most of these pieces would be inserted into any mass setting of the appropriate key. Those requiring more instruments than the standard "Salzburg Church Quartet" are meant to go with specific mass settings that have that instrumentation.

Shortly after Mozart left Salzburg, the Archbishop mandated that an appropriate choral motet or congregational hymn be sung at that point in the liturgy, and the "Epistle Sonata" fell into disuse.

No.	Köchel No.	Date composed	Key	Scoring	NMA	Tempo
1	K.67/41h	1772	E♭ major	2 violins, organ, cello and bass	(Score/Crit. report)	Andantino
2	K.68/41i	1772	B♭ major	2 violins, organ, cello and bass	(Score/Crit. report)	Allegro
3	K.69/41k	1772	D major	2 violins, organ, cello and bass	(Score/Crit. report)	Allegro
4	K.144/124a	1774	D major	2 violins, organ, cello and bass	(Score/Crit. report)	Allegro
5	K.145/124b	1774	F major	2 violins, organ, cello and bass	(Score/Crit. report)	Allegro
6	K.212	1775, July	B♭ major	2 violins, organ, cello and bass	(Score/Crit. report)	Allegro
7	K.224/241a	1776	F major	2 violins, organ, cello and bass	(Score/Crit. report)	Allegro con spirito
8	K.225/241b	1776	A major	2 violins, organ, cello and bass	(Score/Crit. report)	Allegro
9	K.241	1776, January	G major	2 violins, organ, cello and bass	(Score/Crit. report)	Allegro
10	K.244	1776, April	F major	2 violins, organ, cello and bass	(Score/Crit. report)	Allegro
11	K.245	1776, April	D major	2 violins, organ, cello and bass	(Score/Crit. report)	Allegro
12	K.263	1776, December	C major	2 violins, 2 trumpets, organ, cello and bass	(Score/Crit. report)	Allegro
13	K.274/271d	1777	G major	2 violins, organ, cello and bass	(Score/Crit. report)	Allegro
14	K.278/271e	1777, April	C major	2 violins, cello, bass, 2 oboes, 2 trumpets, timpani and organ	(Score/Crit. report)	Allegro
15	K.328/317c	1779	C major	2 violins, organ, cello and bass	(Score/Crit. report)	Allegro
16	K.329/317a	1779, March	C major	2 violins, cello, bass, 2 oboes, 2 horns, 2 trumpets, timpani and organ	(Score/Crit. report)	Allegro
17	K.336/336d	1780	C major	2 violins, organ, cello and bass	(Score/Crit. report)	Allegro
