= How to Grow a Band =

- Film poster
- Directed by: Mark Meatto
- Produced by: Michael Bohlmann; Mark Meatto
- Starring: Chris Thile; Gabe Witcher; Noam Pikelny; Chris Eldridge; Paul Kowert; Greg Garrison; Yo-Yo Ma; John Paul Jones; Jerry Douglas; Edgar Meyer; Sara Watkins
- Edited by: Mark Meatto; Purcell Carson
- Music by: Punch Brothers
- Production company: Shaftway Productions
- Distributed by: International Film Circuit (USA/Theatrical); Cinedigm (USA/Digital)
- Release date: April 15, 2011 (Nashville)
- Running time: 89 minutes
- Country: United States
- Language: English

How To Grow A Band is a 2011 music documentary film about the early days of American progressive bluegrass band Punch Brothers. The film stars Chris Thile, Gabe Witcher, Noam Pikelny, Chris Eldridge, Paul Kowert and Greg Garrison and features interviews with a number of notable musicians including Yo-Yo Ma, John Paul Jones of Led Zeppelin, Jerry Douglas, bassist Edgar Meyer and Sara Watkins of Nickel Creek. The film's narrative structure tracks mandolinist Chris Thile's ambitious four movement suite, "The Blind Leaving the Blind" as it follows the band on their first tour as Punch Brothers in the United Kingdom and United States in early 2008 leading up to a triumphant performance at Jazz at Lincoln Center's Allen Room in New York City.

How to Grow A Band was directed by Mark Meatto and produced by Michael Bohlmann and Mark Meatto and edited by Purcell Carson and Mark Meatto. Daniel Algrant and Bert Keely were executive producers. The film premiered at the 2011 Nashville Film Festival.

== Development ==
Development of the film began in the summer of 2007 when producer Michael Bohlmann and director Mark Meatto approached the band members while they were recording their debut album Punch and preparing for their first tour as Punch Brothers. Bohlmann had grown up in Southern California with Punch Brothers fiddle player Gabe Witcher.

== Production ==
Principal photography began in October 2007 in New York City. The filmmakers followed the band during their first tour as Punch Brothers starting in the United Kingdom including performances at Celtic Connections in Glasgow, Scotland and Bush Hall in London, England. The film follows the band as their tour continues in United States.

== Release ==
The film premiered at the 42nd Nashville Film Festival in Nashville, Tennessee on April 15, 2011. The film also screened as part of the 38th Annual Telluride Bluegrass Festival in June 2011, the Newport Folk Festival in July 2011, Hardly Strictly Bluegrass in October 2011, the 2012 Vancouver International Film Festival and the CBGB Film Festival in New York. How to Grow a Band opened theatrically in New York April 12, 2012 and screened in cities the US throughout 2012. The film was released digitally by Cinedigm in April 2013 on iTunes, Netflix, Hulu and other platforms in the US and UK.

== DVD & Blu-Ray release ==
Following a successful Kickstarter campaign, the film was released in 2014 on DVD and Blu-Ray in a 2-disc deluxe edition that includes the 90 minute film plus a second disc featuring 3 hours of previously unreleased footage and bonus material, for sale through the film's official website and Amazon

== Reception ==
How To Grow A Band received a majority of positive reviews from critics. Joe Leydon of Variety called the film "most fascinating as it tactfully charts the sort of artistic and philosophical differences that can eventually undermine any group endeavor, even among seemingly like-minded collaborators." Nicolas Rapold of the New York Times notes "Meatto’s framing tends to catch the musicians’ give-and-take, merging and dueling notes onstage, especially at a Manhattan concert that is the film’s highlight." Joan Radell of Paste Magazine called the film "masterful filmmaking" and named the film one of the 10 Best Music Documentaries of 2012 New York Magazine named the film a "Critic's Pick" noting that "the music is both challenging and heavenly". Dustin Ogdin wrote for No Depression "HTGAB is not just a film of concert footage or a "behind the scenes" clip collection"; it is a portrait of the creative process.". Some other reviews of the film were less favorable. Slant Magazine writer Joseph Jon Lanthier noted that "One can’t speak of Mark Meatto’s documentary profile, How to Grow a Band, without starting squarely with Thile, because the movie is unsurprisingly devoted to peddling the up-and-comer as something daring, something new.". Marshall Fine of Hollywood & Fine said "'How to Grow a Band' misses its chance to enlighten, choosing instead to promote.
