= All Ashore (album) =

Studio album by Punch Brothers
- Released: July 20, 2018
- Genre: Progressive bluegrass
- Length: 43:16
- Label: Nonesuch
- Producer: Punch Brothers

Punch Brothers chronology
The Wireless (2015)	All Ashore (2018)	Hell on Church Street (2022)

Professional ratings
Aggregate scores
Source	Rating
Metacritic	72/100
Review scores
Source	Rating
AllMusic	3.5/5 stars
Exclaim!	7/10
PopMatters	6/10
The Guardian	3/5 stars
The Music	4.5/5 stars
The Irish Times	5/5 stars

All Ashore is the fifth studio album by the American group Punch Brothers, released on July 20, 2018. The band announced the release of the album's first singles "It's All Part of the Plan" and the instrumental "Three Dots and a Dash" on June 14, 2018. The album was self-produced by the band and was released on the Nonesuch Records label. The nine songs were written and recorded in the sequence of the tracklist at the United Sound studio in Los Angeles, California. The album received generally favorable reviews from critics.

Support from Grammy voting members led to a Grammy Award nomination, and All Ashore won the Grammy Award for Best Folk Album at the 61st Grammy Awards on February 10, 2019.

== Production history ==
After the release of their 2015 album The Phosphorescent Blues the band toured 23 U.S. cities before taking a scheduled hiatus. In October 2016 Punch Brothers frontman Chris Thile became the host of the weekly radio program Live from Here (formerly A Prairie Home Companion) which featured a recurring "song of the week" segment. Thile released ten of these songs in the December 2017 solo album Thanks For Listening.

Punch Brothers fiddler Gabe Witcher produced several albums during the hiatus including Punch Brothers banjoist Noam Pikelny's March 2017 solo album Universal Favorite Punch Brothers guitarist Chris Eldridge's 2017 duo album with Julian Lage Mount Royal Sara Watkins' 2016 album Young in All the Wrong Ways and Punch Brothers bassist Paul Kowert's newly formed band Hawktail's May 2018 album Unless.

Writing and recording the songs for All Ashore occurred sequentially, with band member Gabe Witcher saying that "In doing so we were really able to construct the narrative, musically and lyrically, throughout the whole process." Recording took place at the United Sound studio in Los Angeles, California.

== Track listing ==
No.	Title	Length
1.	"All Ashore"	7:05
2.	"The Angel of Doubt"	5:14
3.	"Three Dots and a Dash"	4:27
4.	"Just Look at This Mess"	5:10
5.	"Jumbo"	3:35
6.	"The Gardener"	4:59
7.	"Jungle Bird"	3:56
8.	"It's All Part of the Plan"	3:37
9.	"Like It's Going Out of Style"	5:13

=== Spotify Singles ===
No.	Title	Length
1.	"Jumbo - Recorded at Spotify Studios NYC"	3:35
2.	"Let It Happen (Tame Impala cover) - Recorded at Spotify Studios NYC"	3:30

== Personnel ==
- Chris Thile - lead vocals, mandolin
- Noam Pikelny - banjo
- Chris Eldridge - acoustic guitar
- Paul Kowert - bass
- Gabe Witcher - fiddle

== Charts ==
Chart	Peak position
US Top Bluegrass Albums (Billboard)	1
US Americana/Folk Albums (Billboard)	8
US Top Rock Albums (Billboard)	48
