= Caitlin Canty =

American singer-songwriter

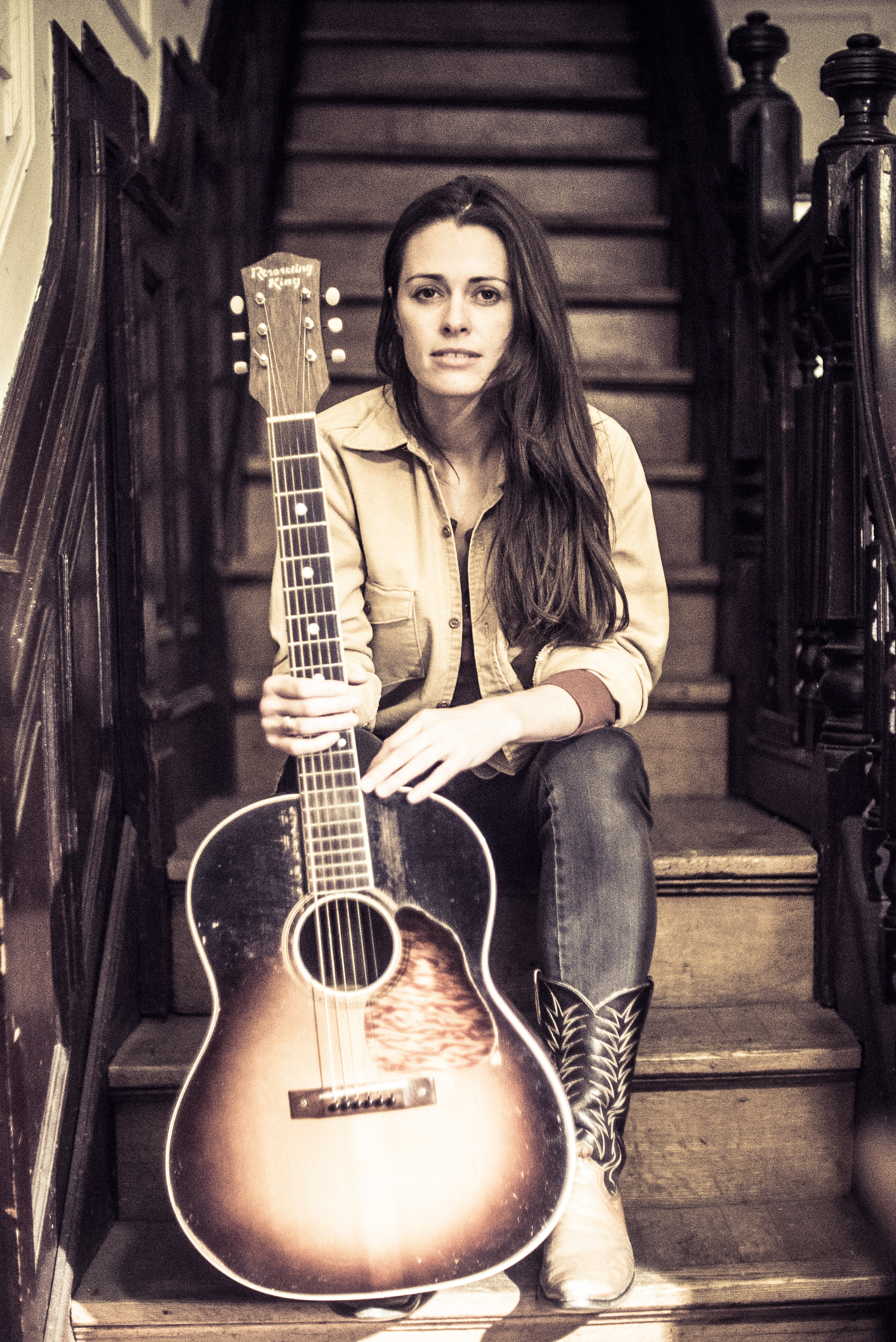
- Caitlin Canty with Recording King guitar.

Background information
- Born: Caitlin Canty; January 24, 1982 (age 44); Proctor, Vermont
- Genres: Americana, folk, alternative country
- Occupations: Songwriter, singer
- Instruments: Vocals, guitar
- Years active: 2007–present
- Website: caitlincanty.com

Caitlin Canty (born January 24, 1982) is an American singer and songwriter. The San Francisco Chronicle calls Canty's alto a "casually devastating voice" and NPR says her music mixes "a gritty side with aching ballads.".

Originally from Vermont, Canty moved to East Nashville, Tennessee in 2015. She tours internationally and spends much of her time on the road. Canty writes and performs primarily on a 1930s Recording King guitar.

== Early life and education ==
Canty was born in Vermont. She sang in the Proctor Junior/Senior High School chorus and played the trombone in the band. At age 17, she was given a guitar as a Christmas gift and learned to play from a VHS tape of guitar lessons. Canty attended Williams College in Williamstown, MA. She majored in biology and took several songwriting classes and began writing songs.

== Career ==
After college, Canty moved to New York City, where she was hired as the first employee of Live from the Artists Den, and later worked as a sustainability consultant. During this time she recorded her first album in her makeshift home studio, and an EP coproduced by the band Darlingside, both of which were out of print as of 2015. After five years working full-time and playing solo shows or singing backing vocals in New York clubs including Rockwood Music Hall and The Living Room, Canty quit her day job to pursue music full-time. Her 2012 album, Golden Hour, was recorded with her trio (Hans Holzen on lap steel and guitars, and Kyle Kegerreis on upright bass) and members of Darlingside in Portland, ME.

Her second album, the critically acclaimed record, Reckless Skyline, was released on January 20, 2015. Produced by Jeffrey Foucault, it creates "a sound that harnesses the grit and spark at the heart of American music, tempered with a voice both haunting and distinct." The studio and touring band includes Billy Conway (Morphine) on drums, Jeremy Moses Curtis (Booker T) on bass, Foucault on guitars and backing vocals, Eric Heywood (Ray LaMontagne, Tift Merritt, The Pretenders) on pedal steel and electric guitars, and Matt Lorenz (The Suitcase Junket, Chris Smither) on pump organ, banjo, piano and fiddle.

Reckless Skyline was recorded over four days at Sonelab in Easthampton, MA. It includes 11 original songs and a cover of Neil Young's "Unknown Legend."

Motel Bouquet, released in 2018, was produced by Noam Pikelny (Punch Brothers) and was recorded live over three days in Nashville, TN. The band features Aoife O’Donovan (vocals), Paul Kowert (bass), Stuart Duncan (fiddle), Gabe Witcher (fiddle), Russ Pahl (pedal steel), and Pikelny on electric guitar and banjo. Rolling Stone has described her music "dreamy and daring" and she was one of Rolling Stone Country's "Ten Country artists you need to know."

Canty writes and records with several bands including Down Like Silver, her duo with Peter Bradley Adams. Down Like Silver released its eponymous EP in 2011 and a single, "Light That Match" in 2014. Canty sings backing vocals on Joy Williams's GRAMMY-nominated record, Front Porch, Adams' record The Mighty Storm and A Face Like Mine, on Darlingside's Pilot Machines and Extralife, on Pieta Brown's Postcards and on Jeffrey Foucault's Salt as Wolves.

== Personal life ==
In 2018, Canty married American banjoist, Noam Pikelny. The couple relocated from Nashville, Tennessee to Vermont, after the birth of their first child in 2020. Their second child was born in 2024.

== Discography ==
- 2007 Green (EP-Out of print)
- 2010 Neon Streets (EP-Out of print)
- 2011 Down Like Silver (with Down Like Silver)
- 2012 Golden Hour
- 2013 Light That Match (with Down Like Silver)
- 2015 Reckless Skyline
- 2016 Lost in the Valley (EP)
- 2018 Broken Coastline (single, with Down Like Silver)
- 2018 Motel Bouquet
- 2023 Quiet Flame
- 2025 Night Owl Envies the Mourning Dove
