= Greg Garrison =

Greg Garrison may refer to:

- Greg Garrison (attorney) (born 1948)
- Greg Garrison (musician) (born 1974), bass player for Leftover Salmon
- Greg Garrison (television producer) (1924-2005)
