= Thanks for Listening =

Thanks for Listening may refer to:

- Thanks for Listening (Colt Ford album)
- Thanks for Listening (Chris Thile album)
- Thanks for Listening (film), a 1937 American comedy film
