= Greg Garrison (musician) =

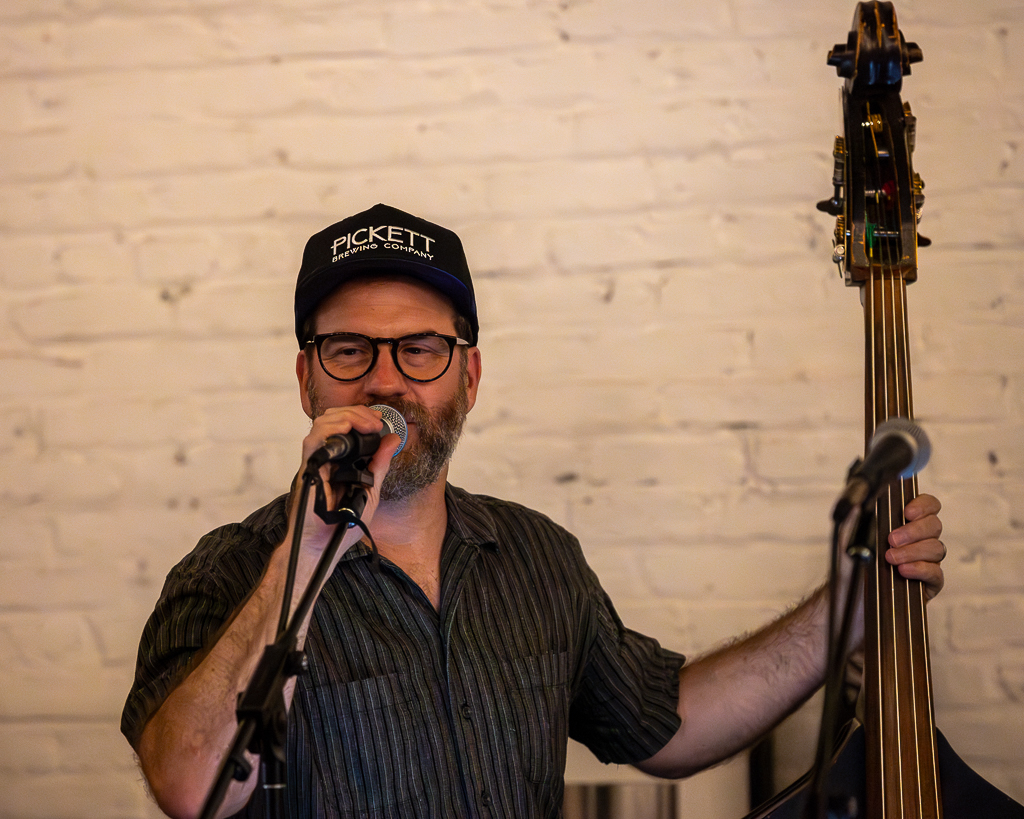
- Garrison in 2024

Background information
- Born: July 16, 1974 (age 51)
- Origin: Edina, Minnesota
- Genres: Bluegrass; Jazz; Americana
- Occupation: Musician
- Instrument: Bass
- Years active: 1998–present
- Website: https://www.greggarrisonmusic.com/

Greg Garrison (born 1974) is an American bassist. He is best known for his work with Leftover Salmon and Mighty Poplar. He was also a founding member of the Punch Brothers.

== Biography ==
Greg Garrison was born in Edina, Minnesota on July 16, 1974. He discovered music at an early age, and began playing the bass in the fifth grade. His family moved to Arlington Heights, Illinois, where he attended Rolling Meadows High School along with Yonder Mountain String Band's Jeff Austin. After high school, they both attended the University of Illinois, where they met Austin’s future bandmate Dave Johnston.

Upon graduation, Garrison moved to Colorado, where he played in Fireweed with Austin and Johnston and in an early version of the Motet. He joined Leftover Salmon in 2000, when bassist Tye North left the band. Garrison has played with Salmon since. During his tenure with the band, he has recorded six studio albums (producing two of them).

Garrison was an original member of the Punch Brothers. The band, originally known as The How To Grow a Band, first came together in 2006 during the recording of How to Grow a Woman from the Ground, while Leftover Salmon was on hiatus. Following the release of the album, the band changed their name to the Punch Brothers. Garrison played with the band for two years, appearing on their debut album, Punch, before leaving in 2008.

In 2020, Garrison helped form bluegrass supergroup Mighty Poplar with Chris Eldridge, Alex Hargreaves, Andrew Marlin, and Noam Pikelny. Their self-titled debut album, released in 2023, was nominated for a Grammy.

Garrison has a doctorate in Music Arts, and teaches at the University of Colorado Denver.

== Recordings ==
In addition to his work with Leftover Salmon, Punch Brothers, and Mighty Poplar, Garrison has released three solo albums, 2011's Low Lonesome, 2020's Sycamore, and the co-led Bluegrass and the Abstract Truth in 2022.

== Discography ==
=== Solo recordings ===
- 2011: Low Lonesome
- 2020: Sycamore
- 2022: Bluegrass and the Abstract Truth
- 2024: Hive Mind w/ Dan Devine and Scott Amendola
- 2025: Ronsongs
