= Antifogmatic =

Studio album by Punch Brothers
- Released: June 15, 2010
- Genre: Progressive bluegrass
- Length: 45:35
- Label: Nonesuch
- Producer: Jon Brion

Punch Brothers chronology
Punch (2008)	Antifogmatic (2010)	Who's Feeling Young Now? (2012)

Professional ratings
Review scores
Source	Rating
The A.V. Club	B+
PopMatters	(8/10)
Slant Magazine	4/5 stars

Antifogmatic is the second album by Punch Brothers. The album was released June 15, 2010.

== Background ==
The Paducah Sun reported, on February 25, 2010, that the album contains ten songs: “'The new music is a real honest collaboration,' Thile said. It is the first album to feature bass player Paul Kowert, who joined the band in late 2008 after the departure of Greg Garrison. Thile said the 10 songs are shorter and more melodic with no leading man. The album was produced by Jon Brion.

Punch Brothers also released a deluxe version of Antifogmatic which contains a four-song EP All Of This Is True and a seven-song live DVD from the band's 2009 residency at New York's The Living Room called Live from the Lower East Side: It's p-Bingo Night! The DVD was directed by Mark Meatto and produced by Michael Bohlmann, the filmmakers behind How to Grow a Band a feature documentary about Punch Brothers released in April of 2012.

From the Nonesuch site: "Antifogmatic is named after a type of 19th-century alcoholic drink that was meant as a cure for the effects of fog and other inclement weather. On choosing the title, Thile notes, '"Antifogmatic" is an old term for a bracing beverage, generally rum or whiskey, that a person would have before going out to work in rough weather to stave off any ill effects. This batch of tunes could be used in much the same way, and includes some characters who would probably benefit mightily, if temporarily, from a good antifogmatic.'"

On June 12, attendees of the 2010 Bonnaroo Music Festival were given the opportunity to purchase the new album three days before the official release, after Punch Brothers played at the Festival. One of Punch Brothers' performances at the Festival was also streamed live over Bonnaroo's YouTube channel and included songs from Antifogmatic.

== Track listing ==
All tracks are written by Punch Brothers unless otherwise noted.

No.	Title	Length
1.	"You Are"	5:06
2.	"Don't Need No"	4:28
3.	"Alex"	5:00
4.	"Rye Whiskey"	3:29
5.	"Me and Us"	6:02
6.	"Missy"	3:54
7.	"The Woman and The Bell"	4:06
8.	"Next to the Trash"	3:05
9.	"Welcome Home"	6:39
10.	"This Is The Song (Good Luck)"	3:54

=== Bonus Tracks ===
No.	Title	Length
1.	"Packt Like Sardines in a Crush'd Tin Box" (Radiohead Cover – iTunes Exclusive)	3:57
2.	"New Chance Blues" (Amazon.com Exclusive)	4:04

=== Deluxe Edition ===
==== All of This Is True EP ====
No.	Title	Length
1.	"Friend or No More?"	4:21
2.	"When in Doubt"	6:50
3.	"Two Hearted"	3:04
4.	"Curtigh"	5:05

==== Live from the Lower East Side: It's p-Bingo Night! (as a DVD) ====
No.	Title	Writer(s)	Length
1.	"On the Bound"	Fiona Apple	5:27
2.	"Ride the Wild Turkey"	Darol Anger	3:42
3.	"This is the Song (Good Luck)"		4:05
4.	"Red Handed"		4:38
5.	"Brandenburg Concerto No. 3, III. Allegro"	J.S. Bach	6:43
6.	"Manchicken"	Noam Pikelny	3:42
7.	"99 Years And One Dark Day/Train 45"	Tim O'Brien/Traditional	7:01

== Personnel ==
Punch Brothers

- Chris Thile – mandolin, vocals
- Gabe Witcher – fiddle, vocals
- Noam Pikelny – banjo, vocals
- Chris Eldridge – guitar, vocals
- Paul Kowert – double bass, vocals
