= Hell on Church Street =

Studio album by Punch Brothers
- Released: January 14, 2022
- Studios: Blackbird (Nashville, Tennessee)
- Genre: Progressive bluegrass
- Length: 43:25
- Label: Nonesuch
- Producer: Punch Brothers

Punch Brothers chronology
All Ashore (2018)	Hell on Church Street (2022)

Hell on Church Street is the sixth studio album by the American group Punch Brothers, released on January 14, 2022. The band announced the release of the album's first single "Church Street Blues" on September 28, 2021. The album was self-produced by the band and was released on the Nonesuch Records label.

The album is a re-imagining of Tony Rice's 1983 album Church Street Blues and is described by the band as "its own work of art and a gift to Rice." that the Wall Street Journal describes as a "cheeky show of respect" and "nicely unpredictable."

The eleven songs were recorded at Blackbird Studio in Nashville, Tennessee in November 2020.

== Production history ==
Before joining the Punch Brothers, guitarist Chris Eldridge studied with guitarist Tony Rice at Oberlin Conservatory in Winter 2003 before graduating in 2004. Rice, inducted into the International Bluegrass Music Hall of Fame in 2013, was a stated inspiration to Chris Thile and Punch Brothers.

After the release of their 2018 album All Ashore and its 2019 win for Grammy Award for Best Folk Album at the 61st Grammy Awards, Punch Brothers covered the entirety of Church Street Blues at the RockyGrass Festival in Lyons, Colorado on July 28, 2019. After cancelling their 2020 tour due to the COVID-19 pandemic the band met in Nashville, Tennessee in November 2020 to record their interpretation of Church Street Blues in its entirety, at the suggestion of banjoist Noam Pikelny. Prior to the recording the band did not listen to the original versions of the songs that Rice had played, to focus on their own version instead of trying to capture the spirit of the original.

The band planned to surprise Rice with the completed album but he died before production was complete.

== Track listing ==
Hell on Church Street track listing
No.	Title	Writer(s)	Length
1.	"Church Street Blues"	Norman Blake	2:33
2.	"Cattle in the Cane"	Traditional	3:32
3.	"Streets of London"	Ralph McTell	4:22
4.	"One More Night"	Bob Dylan	1:49
5.	"The Gold Rush"	Bill Monroe	2:46
6.	"Any Old Time"	Jimmie Rodgers	2:58
7.	"Orphan Annie"	Norman Blake	5:00
8.	"House Carpenter / Jerusalem Ridge"	Traditional / Bill Monroe	7:17
9.	"Last Thing on My Mind"	Tom Paxton	4:25
10.	"Pride of Man"	Hamilton Camp	3:53
11.	"Wreck of the Edmund Fitzgerald"	Gordon Lightfoot	4:45

== Personnel ==
- Chris Thile – lead vocals, mandolin
- Noam Pikelny – banjo
- Chris Eldridge – acoustic guitar
- Paul Kowert – bass
- Gabe Witcher – fiddle

== Charts ==
Chart performance for Hell on Church Street
Chart (2022)	Peak position
Hungarian Albums (MAHASZ)	35
Scottish Albums (Official Charts)	87
