= Not All Those Who Wander Are Lost =

Not All [Those] Who Wander Are Lost, or similar may refer to:

== Literature ==
- The second line of J. R. R. Tolkien's poem "The Riddle of Strider" from The Fellowship of the Ring, 1954
- Not All Those Who Wander Are Lost, a 2010 book by Steve Blank

== Music ==
- Not All Who Wander Are Lost (album), by Chris Thile, 2001
- "Not All Who Wander Are Lost", a song on the 2007 album The Last Kind Words by Devildriver
- "Not All Who Wander Are Lost", a song on the 2021 album Chemtrails over the Country Club by Lana Del Rey
- Not All Those Who Wander are Lost, a 2026 album by Anna Lapwood

== Television ==
- "Not All Who Wander Are Lost", a 2017 episode of Graves
- "Not All Who Wander Are Lost", a 2023 episode of The Way Home
