= Leading Off =

Studio album by Chris Thile
- Released: September 25, 1994
- Genre: Progressive bluegrass
- Label: Sugar Hill
- Producer: Pete Wernick

Chris Thile chronology
Leading Off (1994)	Stealing Second (1997)

Professional ratings
Review scores
Source	Rating
AllMusic	link

Leading Off is the debut solo album by American newgrass mandolinist Chris Thile, released on September 25, 1994, by Sugar Hill Records. Thile was 13 years old at the time of its release.

== Track listing ==
1. "Shadow Ridge" (Thile) – 2:43
2. "Slime Rock" (Thile) – 4:54
3. "Holdin' Down The Fort" (Thile) – 3:00
4. "Faith River" (Thile) – 3:23
5. "Panhandle Rag" (Leon McAuliffe) – 3:16
6. "For All It's Worth" (Thile, Sean Watkins) – 2:01
7. "Shipwrecked" (Thile) – 2:34
8. "Trail's End" (Thile) – 3:35
9. "Salt Creek" (Traditional) – 2:49
10. "Old Dangerfield" (Bill Monroe) – 3:40
11. "Old Favorites Medley" (Traditional) – 4:19
12. "Chris Cross" (Thile) – 3:29
13. "How Great Thou Art" (Stuart Hine) – 3:17

== Personnel ==
=== Musical ===
- Chris Thile – fiddle, guitar, mandolin, arranger
- Scott Thile – bass, engineer, facility consultant
- Sean Watkins – mandolin
- Byron Berline – fiddle
- Dennis Caplinger – banjo
- Stuart Duncan – fiddle
- John Moore – guitar, mandolin
- Scott Nygaard – guitar
- Pete Wernick – banjo, producer

=== Technical ===
- Kurt Storey – Engineer
- David Glasser – Mastering
- Kevin Clock – Mixing
- Bob Murray – Design
