= Deceiver (Chris Thile album) =

Studio album by Chris Thile
- Released: October 12, 2004
- Genre: Bluegrass
- Label: Sugar Hill
- Producer: Chris Thile, Gary Paczosa

Chris Thile chronology
Not All Who Wander Are Lost (2001)	Deceiver (2004)	How to Grow a Woman from the Ground (2006)

Professional ratings
Review scores
Source	Rating
AllMusic	3.5/5 stars
Harp	(positive)
Houston Chronicle	3.5/5 stars
Rolling Stone	3/5 stars

Deceiver is the fourth solo album by American newgrass mandolinist Chris Thile, released on Sugar Hill in 2004. It features a total of 39 instruments, all played by Thile himself. The instruments played on the album include the mandolin, mandola, bass guitar, electric guitar, piano, violin, banjo and various percussion instruments. In 2005, the album was nominated the Grammy Award for Best Engineered Album, Non-Classical to the album's engineers, Thile and Gary Paczosa.

== Musical style ==
In a 2007 interview, Chris Thile discussed what he musically envisioned for Deceiver:

I had to get that record out of my system I think. I really love pop music. I really love well made pop music. I needed to try making a pop record before I could move on and do what I really think I actually should be doing. That [last record] was like exploring pop music, not as an influence of mine, but as the desired result. Sometimes it works, but that ultimately I'm just not a pop musician. I love [pop music]; I think it's a very noble calling. But it's not my calling. And that's kinda how I feel about that record. I feel like I hit the nail on the head about maybe two or three out of ten. Which is not a high enough percentage. That being said, I'm proud of that record because I think it helped me get that out of my system. I also like the control thing. I realized I don't want that much control. That's just too much control for any one musician to have. And it's not necessarily conducive to the best music making.

== Track listing ==
All tracks composed by Chris Thile

1. "The Wrong Idea" - 2:37
2. "On Ice" - 3:52
3. "Locking Doors" - 2:44
4. "Waltz For Dewayne Pomeroy" - 3:03
5. "Empire Falls" - 2:58
6. "I'm Nowhere and You're Everything" - 5:54
7. "Jessamyn's Reel" - 1:54
8. "The Believer" - 2:35
9. "This Is All Real" - 3:27
10. "Ready For Anything" - 5:15

== Personnel ==
- Chris Thile - Music, Arranger, Producer, Art Direction, Design
- Gary Paczosa - Producer, Engineer
- Wendy Stamberger - Art Direction
