= Stealing Second =

Studio album by Chris Thile
- Released: March 18, 1997
- Genre: Bluegrass
- Label: Sugar Hill
- Producer: Sam Bush

Chris Thile chronology
Leading Off (1993)	Stealing Second (1997)	Not All Who Wander Are Lost (2001)

Professional ratings
Review scores
Source	Rating
Allmusic	link

Stealing Second is the second solo album by American newgrass mandolinist Chris Thile, released in 1997 on Sugar Hill. All of the songs on Stealing Second were written by Thile. The title track of the album reached number 12 on the bluegrass charts in the U.S in 1997.

== Track listing ==
1. "Ah Spring" - 1:44
2. "Stealing Second" - 3:14
3. "Kneel Before Him" - 4:41
4. "Bittersweet Reel" - 5:04
5. "Alderaanian Melody" - 2:50
6. "Hyperdrive" - 3:38
7. "Leaves Fall" - 4:20
8. "A Night In Mos Eisley" - 2:50
9. "Hop The Fence" - 2:57
10. "The Game Is Afoot" - 6:38
11. "Clear The Tracks" - 3:02
12. "Golden Pond" - 3:11
13. "Road To Wrigley" - 3:22
14. "Ryno's Lament" - 2:25

== Personnel ==
=== Musical ===
- Chris Thile - bouzouki, mandolin
- Russ Barenberg - guitar
- Alison Brown - banjo
- Sam Bush - fiddle, guitar, producer
- Jerry Douglas - dobro
- Stuart Duncan - fiddle
- David Grier - guitar
- Scott Thile - bass
- Scott Vestal - banjo

=== Technical ===
- Bradley Hartman - Engineer
- Randy LeRoy - Mastering
- Sue Meyer - Design
