= Who's Feeling Young Now? =

Studio album by Punch Brothers
- Released: February 14, 2012
- Studio: Blackbird (Nashville)
- Genre: Progressive bluegrass
- Length: 45:35
- Label: Nonesuch Records
- Producer: Jacquire King

Punch Brothers chronology
Antifogmatic (2010)	Who's Feeling Young Now? (2012)	The Phosphorescent Blues (2015)

Who's Feeling Young Now? is the third album by Punch Brothers, released February 14, 2012.

== Background ==
The band Punch Brothers recorded the album at Blackbird Studio in Nashville, Tennessee with producer/engineer Jacquire King. The album has been described as "remarkably close to the indie-rock sounds of today" for a bluegrass album. The album is considered more accessible than the band's previous work, based on a decision not to over-complicate the music: "instead of adding parts, you’re reinforcing existing parts."

"Movement and Location", a song written by Chris Thile, a long time baseball fan of the Chicago Cubs, was inspired by former Cubs pitcher Greg Maddux's obsession over the movement and location of his pitches.

== Track listing ==
All tracks are written by Punch Brothers except where noted.

No.	Title	Writer(s)	Length
1.	"Movement and Location"		4:05
2.	"This Girl"		3:35
3.	"No Concern of Yours"		4:08
4.	"Who's Feeling Young Now?"		4:09
5.	"Clara"		3:21
6.	"Flippen"	Väsen	4:25
7.	"Patchwork Girlfriend"		3:48
8.	"Hundred Dollars"	Punch Brothers, Josh Ritter	4:47
9.	"Soon or Never"		4:45
10.	"New York City"	Punch Brothers, Josh Ritter	3:47
11.	"Kid A"	Radiohead	4:53
12.	"Don't Get Married Without Me"		4:12

=== Bonus Tracks (vinyl only) ===
No.	Title	Length
1.	"Roses Blooming in the Dark"	3:35
2.	"Moonshiner"	4:24
3.	"Knock Me Down"	2:57
4.	"Shh, Just Let Me Do This"	1:33

== Personnel ==
- Chris Thile – mandolin, vocals
- Gabe Witcher – fiddle, vocals
- Noam Pikelny – banjo, vocals
- Chris Eldridge – guitar, vocals
- Paul Kowert – double bass, vocals
