= How to Grow a Woman from the Ground =

Studio album by Chris Thile
- Released: September 12, 2006
- Studios: Sear Sound, New York City, U.S.
- Genres: Bluegrass, progressive bluegrass
- Length: 50:28
- Label: Sugar Hill
- Producer: Chris Thile

Chris Thile chronology
Deceiver (2004)	How to Grow a Woman from the Ground (2006)	Bach: Sonatas and Partitas, Vol. 1 (2013)

How to Grow a Woman from the Ground is a 2006 album by Chris Thile and Punch Brothers. It was released on Sugar Hill on September 12, 2006. The album is named after a song on the album, a cover of the original by folk singer Tom Brosseau.

The album debuted to positive reviews from major music critics, with critics calling the album “fantastic, eclectic”, and “genius”. The album earned Thile a Grammy Award-nomination in 2006.

== Conception and production ==
For one of his side projects, Chris Thile knew he wanted to form a string quintet composed of mandolin, violin, banjo, guitar, and bass with childhood friend and fiddler Gabe Witcher, but didn’t know which direction he wanted to take the band. At the Telluride Bluegrass Festival in Telluride, Colorado, Thile met banjoist Noam Pikelny and later commented that “every note he played was something I wish I’d played”. It was then that Thile realized that he wanted to “put [his] stamp on the traditional bluegrass ensemble”. Thile wanted to get five musicians together for a Nashville jam session in 2005, after he found talented bluegrass musicians that could fill the positions. The bassist Thile was searching for, Greg Garrison, was recommended to Thile by Pikelny, who had performed alongside Garrison in the Cajun jam band Leftover Salmon. The guitar position was filled by Chris Eldridge, from the bluegrass band the Infamous Stringdusters. The five musicians met up in Nashville one day in 2005 and decided that they needed to “do something musical together”. A few nights later, the group met again “just to drop a ton of money, drink too much wine, eat steaks, and commiserate about our failed relationships”. That night, they came to an agreement and formed a bluegrass band.

The quintet decided to make this project serious and record an album. The album was recorded over the course of two days in 2006 at Sear Sound Recording Studios in New York. The album was not recorded digitally, but rather on tape. In an interview with the United States magazine Guitar Player, Chris Thile explained the old fashioned style in which the album was recorded:

It was recorded at Sear Sound in New York using two vintage Telefunken ELA M 251 E mics into a Forsell Technologies FetCode preamp. Most of it was recorded onto the same Studer 1" two-track that was used to mix Sgt. Pepper's Lonely Hearts Club Band! Everything was tracked live, and I’ve decided never to record wearing headphones again unless I absolutely have to. Wearing headphones is bullshit, because you’re in your own little world playing to a mix that no one will ever hear but you. What’s the point?

How to Grow a Woman from the Ground was self produced by Thile, and had no guest musicians, just the quintet. Other than the band, which in promotion of the album was named the How to Grow a Band, the album had a fairly small production crew; an engineer, an assistant engineer, two mastering people, and an artist.

== Musical style ==
How to Grow a Woman from the Ground takes influence from different genres, “drawing equally from traditional bluegrass, progressive acoustic, and singer/songwriter traditions”, with one critic calling the majority of the album very “roots oriented”. The album has a bluegrass or progressive bluegrass core; bluegrass mandolinist Ronnie McCoury became the album’s official “bluegrass guru” to ensure that there was “someone who could make sure we didn’t do anything clichéd or trite”. In regard to the album’s style, Thile said that “All in all, How to Grow a Woman from the Ground is a bluegrass record. There are definitely some musical things that are out of the ordinary, but it sounds like a bluegrass record to me. It’s not all like “Brakeman’s Blues,” but “Brakeman’s Blues” doesn’t sound out of place, and neither does “The Beekeeper” sound out of place. It’s all related.” Much of Thile's work on the album was influenced by his divorce, and Thile claims that he could relate to the title of the album, a Tom Brosseau song. Thile said that he "got my ass kicked by the last relationship I was in. This girl just left. It created a pretty serious complex for me. I’ve always been able to talk to girls, but I’m scared of them. I just could relate to it. Like, man if I could just grow one, that would take care of a lot of problems."

== Critical reception ==
Professional ratings
Review scores
Source	Rating
AllMusic	4/5 stars
Arizona Republic	3.5/5 stars
Entertainment Weekly	(feature)
Harp	(positive)
JamBase	(positive)
Music Box	3/5 stars
Portsmouth Herald	(feature)

How to Grow a Woman from the Ground received positive reviews from country and bluegrass music critics. AllMusic called it "fantastic", and JamBase described it as "a tasteful string dinner" and stated that "this is only the beginning of great things to come". However, some critics found particular tracks too pale in comparison to the rest of the material. The Arizona Republic stated that the album was "amazing", except for "Dead Leaves and the Dirty Ground" because "Thile [couldn't] quite match Jack White's musical hysteria". Music Box also said that tracks like "Stay Away" and "I’m Yours If You Want Me" "completely fell flat". Regardless, the review still stated that "the bulk of How to Grow a Woman from the Ground is remarkably engaging". Bullz-Eye criticized Thile's vocal quality, saying that "his voice often lacks the strength and/or character to carry the song". On the contrary, the previously mentioned JamBase article complimented Thile's vocal strength, saying "it's the soul in Thile's voice and the heart and intensity of the musicianship that give the album its power."

== Track listing ==
#	Title	Songwriters	Length
1	"Watch 'at Breakdown"	Chris Thile	4:14
2	"Dead Leaves and the Dirty Ground"	Jack White	4:15
3	"Stay Away"	Chris Thile	3:56
4	"O Santo de Polvora"	Milladoiro	2:37
5	"Wayside (Back in Time)"	Gillian Welch, David Rawlings	2:45
6	"You're an Angel, And I'm Gonna Cry"	Chris Thile	2:57
7	"How to Grow a Woman From the Ground"	Tom Brosseau	5:08
8	"The Beekeeper"	Chris Thile	4:06
9	"Brakeman's Blues"	Jimmie Rodgers	3:42
10	"If The Sea Was Whiskey"	Willie Dixon	2:43
11	"Cazadero"	Paul Shelasky	3:34
12	"Heart in a Cage"	Julian Casablancas	4:23
13	"I'm Yours If You Want Me"	Chris Thile	3:49
14	"The Eleventh Reel"	Chris Thile	3:28

== Personnel ==
- Chris Thile – mandolin, lead vocals, producer
- Noam Pikelny – banjo, vocals
- Greg Garrison – bass, vocals
- Chris Eldridge – acoustic guitar, vocals
- Gabe Witcher – fiddle, vocals
- Ronnie McCoury – "bluegrass guru"
- Loren Witcher – artwork
- Gary Paczosa – mastering
- Fred Forsell – mastering engineer
- Matthew Gephart – engineer
- Ethan Donaldson – assistant engineer

== Chart performance ==
Chart (2006)	Peak position
U.S. Billboard Top Heatseekers	28
U.S. Billboard Top Country Albums	46
U.S. Billboard Top Independent Albums	27
U.S. Billboard Top Bluegrass Albums	2
