= Bach: Sonatas and Partitas, Vol. 1 =

Studio album by Chris Thile
- Released: August 5, 2013
- Recorded: January 12–17, 2013
- Studios: The Barn, Lenox, Massachusetts
- Genre: Classical
- Length: 64:00
- Label: Nonesuch Records
- Producer: Edgar Meyer

Chris Thile chronology
How to Grow a Woman from the Ground (2006)	Bach: Sonatas and Partitas, Vol. 1 (2013)	Thanks for Listening (2017)

Professional ratings
Aggregate scores
Source	Rating
Metacritic	82/100
Review scores
Source	Rating
AllMusic	4.5/5 stars
musicOMH	4/5 stars
PopMatters	7/10
Uncut	3.5/5 stars

Bach: Sonatas and Partitas, Vol. 1 is a studio album by American mandolinist Chris Thile. The album was released via Nonesuch Records on August 5, 2013.

== Reception ==
At Metacritic, that assigns a normalized rating out of 100 to reviews from mainstream critics, the album received an average score of 82, based on six reviews, which indicates "universal acclaim".

Douglas Heselgrave of Paste Magazine wrote "Bach: Sonatas and Partitas Volume 1 is clearly a labor of love rather than a plea for respect. By sticking very close to Bach’s original transcriptions of these compositions, Thile has recorded an album that should stand up to scrutiny in the classical music community without sacrificing his original style or approach to his instrument. He’s proven that he’s up to the task of rendering this incredibly complex music as well as showing—especially in the faster sections—that the distance between baroque and bluegrass is shorter than we may previously have thought."

Andy Gill of The Independent stated "Once again, the protean malleability of J.S. Bach's genius is demonstrated by the unusual transcription of his work - in this case, the Violin Sonatas and Partitas - to another instrument, the mandolin".
