= Not All Who Wander Are Lost (album) =

Studio album by Chris Thile
- Released: October 9, 2001
- Genre: Bluegrass
- Label: Sugar Hill
- Producer: Chris Thile

Chris Thile chronology
Stealing Second (1997)	Not All Who Wander Are Lost (2001)	Deceiver (2004)

Professional ratings
Review scores
Source	Rating
Allmusic	4/5 stars
Independent Weekly	(positive)
The Daily Tar Heel	5/5 stars

Not All Who Wander Are Lost is the third solo album by American virtuoso mandolinist Chris Thile. It was released on Sugar Hill in 2001.

The record builds on his previous work in that it is largely bluegrass and newgrass inspired. Although Not All Who Wander Are Lost was Thile's third solo album, it is widely considered his first major one, primarily based on the fact that Nickel Creek's initial success came in 2000 with their platinum debut album.

The picture on the cover of the album was taken in June 2001 in San Francisco before a Nickel Creek show at the Great American Music Hall.

== Etymology ==
The album's title is taken from a poem in J. R. R. Tolkien's The Fellowship of the Ring, The Riddle of Strider.

The title of the song "Riddles in the Dark" is also rooted in the works of Tolkien. It is the title of the chapter in The Hobbit where Bilbo and Gollum compete in a contest of riddles.

The title of the song "Club G.R.O.S.S." comes from the Calvin and Hobbes comic strip. The club was started by Calvin and his stuffed tiger, and stands for "Get Rid Of Slimy GirlS".

== Track listing ==
All tracks are written by Chris Thile, except track 4 by Béla Fleck and Chris Thile.

No.	Title	Length
1.	"Song for a Young Queen"	5:27
2.	"Wolfcreek Pass"	4:18
3.	"Raining at Sunset"	7:20
4.	"Riddles in the Dark"	3:24
5.	"Sinai to Canaan - Part I"	7:19
6.	"Sinai to Canaan - Part II"	3:57
7.	"Club G.R.O.S.S."	5:46
8.	"You Deserve Flowers"	3:19
9.	"Eureka!"	3:45
10.	"Big Sam Thompson"	5:15
11.	"Bridal Veil Falls"	4:53
12.	"Laurie De' Tullins"	5:14
Total length:		59:57

== Personnel ==
=== Musical ===
- Chris Thile - mandolin, producer, mixing
- Jeff Coffin - tenor saxophone
- Jerry Douglas - dobro
- Stuart Duncan - fiddle
- Béla Fleck - banjo
- Byron House - bass, guitar
- Edgar Meyer - bass
- Bryan Sutton - guitar
- Sara Watkins - fiddle
- Sean Watkins - guitar

=== Technical ===
- Jenny Anne Bulla - Photography
- Robert Hadley - Mastering
- Brent Hedgecock - Photography
- Scott Thile - Photography
- Gary Paczosa - Engineer, Mixing
- Doug Sax - Mastering
