= Greg Garrison (attorney) =

American lawyer (born 1948)

- Born: 1948 (age 77–78); Indianapolis, Indiana, U.S.
- Education: Indiana University, Bloomington (BS); Indiana University, Indianapolis (JD)
- Spouse: Phyllis

James Gregory Garrison (born 1948) is an American county prosecutor, attorney and former radio host. He was elected Prosecuting Attorney of Hamilton County, Indiana in 2022.

== Personal background ==
Garrison was born in Indianapolis, Indiana. He graduated from Indiana University Bloomington in 1970 with a B.S. and the Indiana University Robert H. McKinney School of Law in 1973 with a J.D. Garrison is married to Phyllis, also an attorney.

== Legal career ==
With his brother Chris Garrison, Greg Garrison is a lawyer in the Garrison Law Firm, LLC specializing in personal injury, business law, and general litigation.

Previously, Garrison presided over civil cases in the Marion County, Indiana Prosecutor's Office. Garrison gained national attention in 1992 as special prosecutor in the rape case of boxer Mike Tyson. He has also served as a CBS News legal analyst.

== Radio career ==
Garrison debuted on Indianapolis news/talk station WIBC on June 2, 1997, and his show became syndicated statewide on Network Indiana on January 3, 2000, in replacement of Mike Pence, who would later become Governor of Indiana and Vice President of the United States. In April 2017, Garrison announced his retirement from radio, with his final show taking place on June 9.
