= Young in All the Wrong Ways =

Studio album by Sara Watkins
- Released: July 1, 2016
- Genre: Americana, roots rock
- Length: 41:15
- Label: New West
- Producer: Gabe Witcher

Sara Watkins chronology
Sun Midnight Sun (2012)	Young in All the Wrong Ways (2016)

Professional ratings
Aggregate scores
Source	Rating
Metacritic	79/100
Review scores
Source	Rating
PopMatters	(7/10)

Young in All the Wrong Ways is the third studio album by American musician Sara Watkins. It was released in July 2016 under New West Records. It reached No.1 on the Billboard Top Heatseekers Chart and No.19 on the Billboard Top Rock Chart.

== Track list ==
All songs written by Sara Watkins except "One Last Time" by Watkins and Jon Foreman, "Like New Year's Day" by Watkins and Dan Wilson, and "Without a Word" by Watkins and Gabe Witcher

No.	Title	Length
1.	"Young In All the Wrong Ways"	4:18
2.	"The Love That Got Away"	3:16
3.	"One Last Time"	3:08
4.	"Move Me"	5:46
5.	"Like New Year's Day"	4:55
6.	"Say So"	4:08
7.	"Without a Word"	3:58
8.	"The Truth Won't Set Us Free"	3:32
9.	"Invisible"	5:20
10.	"Tenderhearted"	2:54

== Personnel ==
- Jim Gilstrap - vocals
- Greg Leisz - strings
- Patrick Warren - pump organ
- Jay Bellerose - drums, percussion, whistle, bells
- Jean McClain - background vocals
- Niki Haris - vocals
- David Piltch - upright bass, electric bass
- Keefus Ciancia - prepared piano
- Karin Bergquist - vocals, acoustic guitar
- Levon Henry - tenor saxophone
- Linford Detweiler - vocals, acoustic guitar, electric guitar, piano, Wurlitzer organ
