= Paul Kowert =

- Born: July 18, 1986 (age 40)
- Origin: Madison, Wisconsin, US
- Genres: Classical; Bluegrass; Progressive bluegrass
- Occupation: Musician
- Instruments: Double Bass, Mandolin, Guitar, Violin, Piano
- Years active: 2008-present
- Labels: Nonesuch Records, Padiddle Records

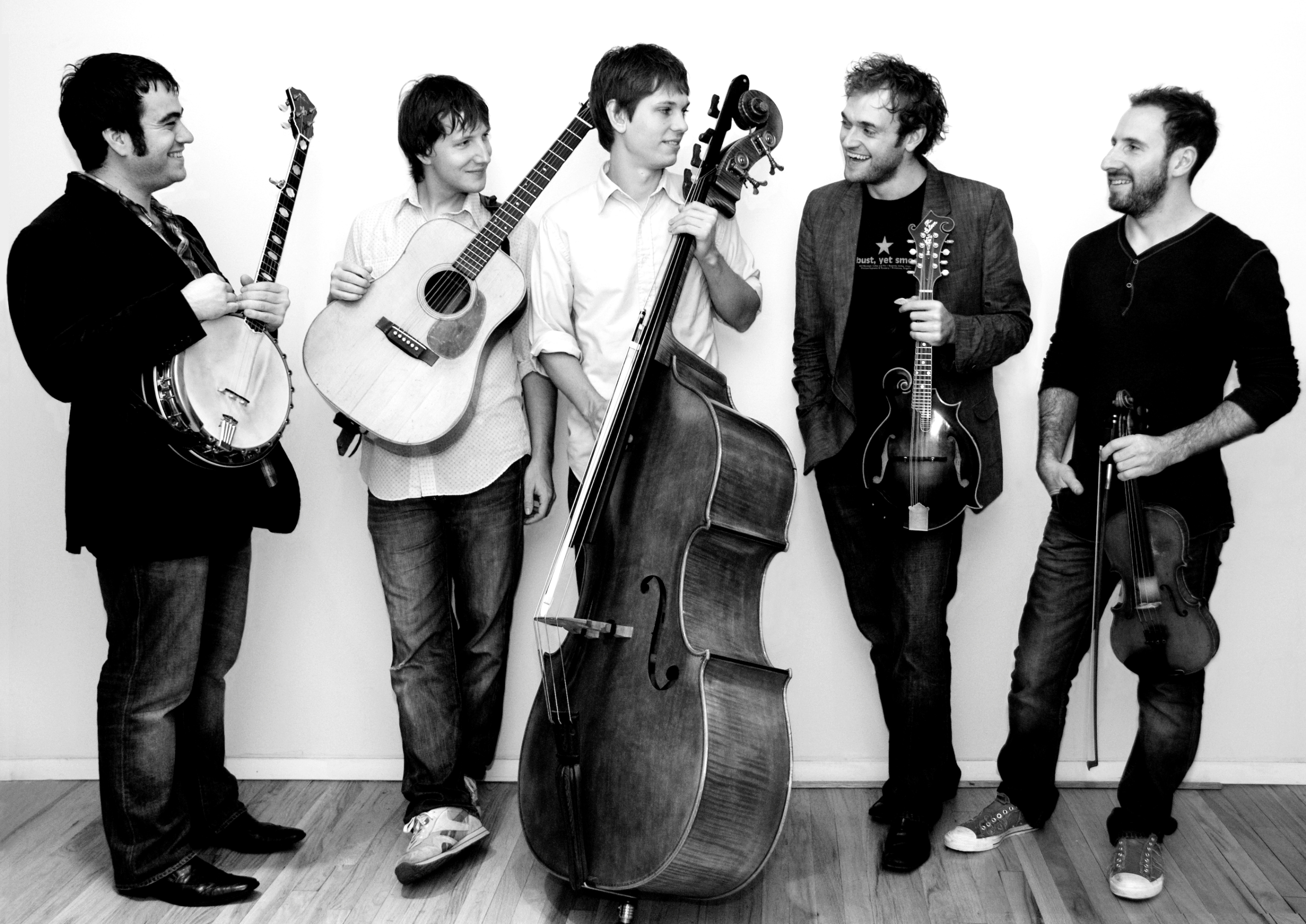
Kowert (center) with Punch Brothers.

Paul Kowert (born July 18, 1986) is an American bassist and composer. His styles include classical, bluegrass, and progressive bluegrass. He is a member of the progressive acoustic quintet Punch Brothers and a founding member of Hawktail, an acoustic supergroup composed of Kowert, fiddler Brittany Haas, guitarist Jordan Tice, and mandolinist Dominick Leslie.

== Biography ==
Kowert grew up in Middleton, Wisconsin. He transitioned to playing bass from violin at age 9. He studied under Edgar Meyer at the Curtis Institute of Music, graduating in 2009. While still pursuing his degree at Curtis, Kowert was recruited to join Punch Brothers. Bandmate Chris Thile said of Kowert's arrival, "that’s when the band really became a band." He remained the only non-founding member of the ensemble until Brittany Haas joined in 2023. During the summer of 2026 he joined Gillian Welch and David Rawlings on a tour playing the music of the Grateful Dead.

== Equipment ==
Kowert plays the double bass made by luthier Daniel Hachez in 2006 ("Daniel Hachez Bass #28"). Inspired by mentor Edgar Meyer, Kowert plays in an unconventional tuning that combines orchestral tuning and solo tuning. In orchestral (or "standard") tuning, the bass is tuned in ascending fourths from E to G (i.e., E, A, D, G). In solo tuning, the bass is also tuned in fourths but begins a major second above orchestral tuning, running from F# to A (i.e., F#, B, E, A). Kowert's tuning adheres to solo tuning for the instrument's three highest strings but reverts to orchestral tuning for the lowest string (i.e., E, B, E, A). Additionally, Kowert regularly uses a C extension, resulting in an even wider range of pitch (i.e., C, B, E, A).

In addition to his Hachez bass, Kowert regularly plays a Shen SB-180 bass modified by luthier Arnold Schnitzer to include a removable neck. This modification, Kowert claims, has proven indispensable for the demands of touring, particularly with Punch Brothers. "The way we traveled on the Who's Feeling Young Now? tour," Kowert explains, "would not have been possible without this thing."

Since 2021, Kowert exclusively uses a bass made by Nick Lloyd (#55, 2021).

Kowert uses a bow made by Reid Hudson.

== Discography ==
With Punch Brothers

- Antifogmatic (2010)
- Who's Feeling Young Now? (2012)
- Ahoy! (2012)
- The Phosphorescent Blues (2015)
- All Ashore (2018)
- Hell on Church Street (2022)

With Mike Marshall's Big Trio

- Mike Marshall's Big Trio (2009)

With Haas Kowert Tice

- You Got This (2014)

With Hawktail

- Unless (2018)
- Formations (2020)
- Place Of Growth (2022)
