= The Phosphorescent Blues =

Studio album by Punch Brothers
- Released: January 27, 2015
- Genre: Progressive bluegrass
- Length: 46:47
- Label: Nonesuch Records
- Producer: T Bone Burnett

Punch Brothers chronology
Who's Feeling Young Now? (2012)	The Phosphorescent Blues (2015)	The Wireless (2015)

Professional ratings
Review scores
Source	Rating
Allmusic	4/5 stars
The Music	4.5/5 stars

The Phosphorescent Blues is the fourth studio album by the American group Punch Brothers, released on January 27, 2015. The band announced the release of the album's first single, "I Blew It Off", on November 17, 2014. On December 4, 2014, the group announced the album's name and release date, along with the second single, "Julep". Julep was nominated for Best American Roots Song and Best American Roots Performance at the 2016 Grammy Awards. The album's cover is from the René Magritte painting The Lovers (1928).

== Track listing ==
No.	Title	Writer(s)	Length
1.	"Familiarity"		10:23
2.	"Julep"		5:26
3.	"Passepied" (from Suite bergamasque)	Claude Debussy	3:30
4.	"I Blew It Off"		3:07
5.	"Magnet"		3:14
6.	"My Oh My"		4:19
7.	"Boll Weevil"		2:36
8.	"Prélude" (Op. 22 No. 2)	Alexander Scriabin	0:58
9.	"Forgotten"		4:17
10.	"Between 1st and A"		4:15
11.	"Little Lights"		4:42

Vinyl-exclusive
No.	Title	Writer(s)	Length
12.	"Sleek White Baby"
13.	"Clementine"	Elliott Smith
14.	"The Hops of Guldenberg"		4:52
15.	"The Wireless"

== Personnel ==
- Chris Thile – lead vocals, bouzouki, mandola, mandolin
- Noam Pikelny – banjo
- Chris Eldridge – acoustic guitar
- Paul Kowert – bass
- Gabe Witcher – fiddle
- Jay Bellerose – drums
- T Bone Burnett – electric guitars on "I Blew It Off", "Magnet" and "Little Lights"
