= The Suitcase Junket =

- Born: Matthew Lorenz
- Genres: Indie pop; Folk; Soul
- Occupations: Singer-songwriter, musician
- Instruments: Vocals, guitar, percussion, saxophone, violin
- Years active: 2005–present
- Website: thesuitcasejunket.com

The Suitcase Junket is the one-man recording and touring project of American singer-songwriter and multi-instrumentalist Matt Lorenz. He is known for his solo performances on a setup of instruments of his own construction made from found objects, and for his releases on Signature Sounds Recordings and BMG/Renew Records.

== Early life and education ==
Lorenz was born in Cavendish, Vermont and attended Green Mountain Union High School in Chester. He studied piano, violin, and saxophone. He was initially homeschooled. He attended Hampshire College in Amherst, Massachusetts, where he created his own major in instrumental music, then busked in Europe for a year.

== Career ==
Back in Amherst, Lorenz and his sister Kate Lorenz formed the band Rusty Belle with Zak Trojano. Rusty Belle released six albums and EPs between 2007 and 2014. Rusty Belle played on Chris Smither's 2014 album Still on the Levee.

Kate collaborated with Lorenz on his solo projects as well. To make a living, Lorenz worked on farms and painted houses. He began performing as The Suitcase Junket in 2005. By 2009 he was making his living as a solo artist, calling his style "swamp yankee music."

As The Suitcase Junket, Lorenz typically performs about 200 shows a year, including at festivals such as Hardly Strictly Bluegrass, Winnipeg Folk Festival, Clearwater Festival, FreshGrass Festival, Philadelphia Folk Festival, AmericanaFest, Joshua Tree Music Festival, and High Sierra Music Festival, and venues including World Cafe Live, The Kennedy Center's Millennium Stage, and Club Passim.

He released his first album as The Suitcase Junket, Sever & Lift, in 2010. His 2015 album Make Time produced the single "Twisted Fate" that was streamed more than 7 million times on Spotify, and "The Rain" from his 2016 EP Dying Star was streamed more than 11 million times there. Signature Sounds Recordings released his fourth album, 2017's Pile Driver.

In 2016 Lorenz composed soundtrack music for Jedediah Berry's The Family Arcana storytelling playing-card deck.

Upon the 2019 release of his album Mean Dog, Trampoline, produced by Steve Berlin of Los Lobos, and also on Signature Sounds, NPR called him a "master of musical imagination" and Blogcritics called him "one of the great lyricists of our day."

His 2020 album The End Is New was released on BMG's then-new Americana label Renew Records.

In July 2026 he announced the release of his seventh album, To Go On, on Bad Chef Records/Symphonic.

=== Visual Art ===
Lorenz is also a visual artist and often creates the artwork for his albums.

== Personal life ==
Matt Lorenz lives in Western Massachusetts. When not on the road, he spends time pressing cider and sugaring.

His 2026 album To Go On was influenced by the loss of his sister Kate, who died in 2022.

== Discography ==
| Album | Year | Label | Artist |
|---|---|---|---|
| To Go On | 2026 | Bad Chef Records/Symphonic | The Suitcase Junket |
| The End Is New | 2020 | Renew Records/BMG | The Suitcase Junket |
| Mean Dog, Trampoline | 2019 | Signature Sounds Recordings | The Suitcase Junket |
| Live With Others (EP) | 2018 | | The Suitcase Junket |
| Pile Driver | 2017 | Signature Sounds Recordings | The Suitcase Junket |
| Dying Star (EP) | 2016 | | The Suitcase Junket |
| Make Time | 2015 | | The Suitcase Junket |
| Common Crow (EP) | 2014 | | Rusty Belle |
| Common Courtesy | 2013 | | Rusty Belle |
| Live from Easthampton | 2012 | | Rusty Belle |
| Knock It Down | 2011 | | The Suitcase Junket |
| Sever & Lift | 2010 | | The Suitcase Junket |
| On a Full Moon Weekend | 2010 | | Rusty Belle |
| Vanity Pack | 2009 | | Rusty Belle |
| Rusty Belle | 2007 | | Rusty Belle |
