= Punch Brothers =

American band

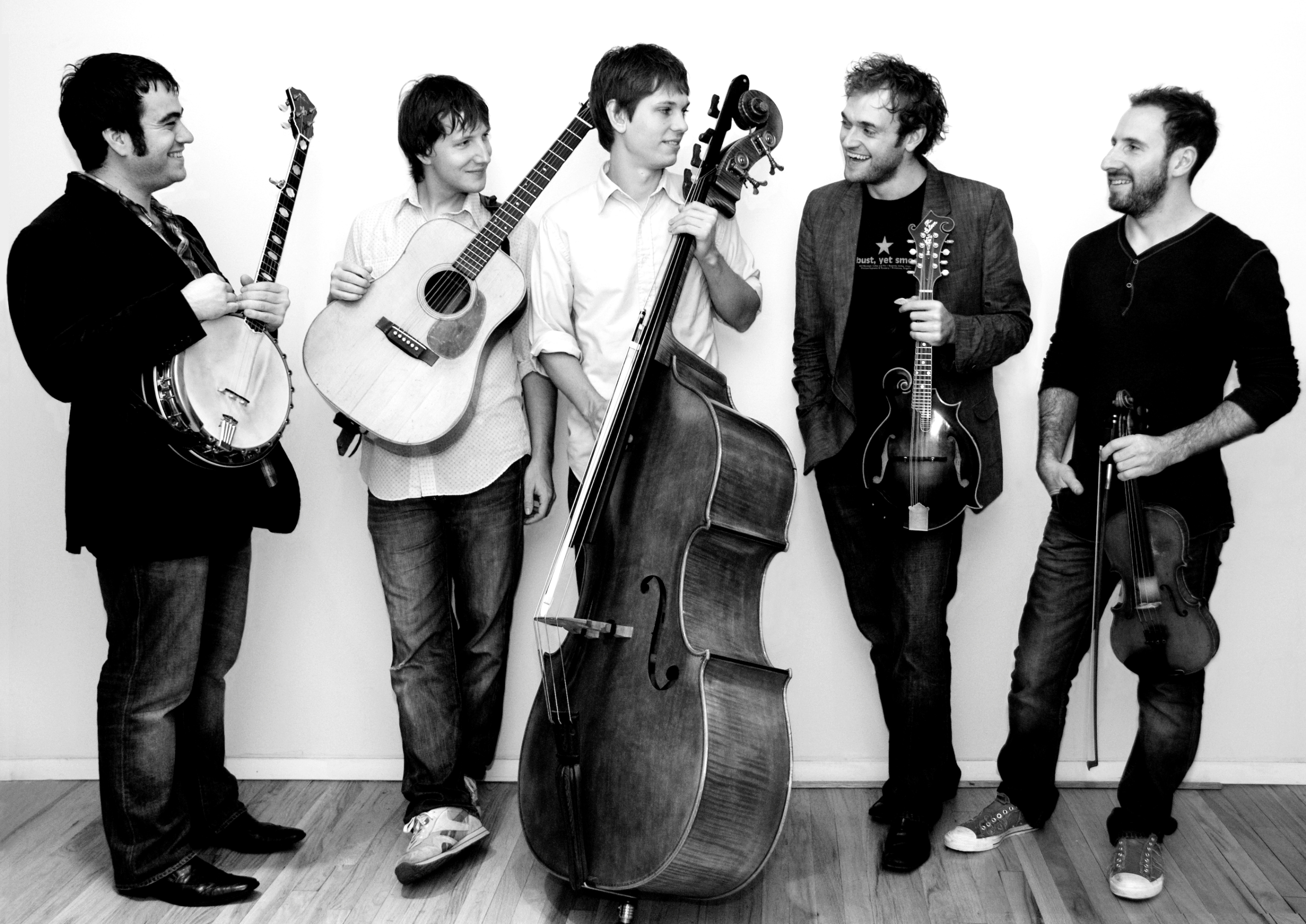

Background information
- Origin: Brooklyn, New York, U.S.
- Genres: Progressive bluegrass; classical; acoustic
- Years active: 2006–present
- Label: Nonesuch
- Members: Chris Thile; Noam Pikelny; Chris Eldridge; Paul Kowert; Brittany Haas
- Past members: Bryan Sutton; Greg Garrison; Gabe Witcher
- Website: punchbrothers.com

Punch Brothers is an American band consisting of Chris Thile (mandolin), Brittany Haas (fiddle/violin), Noam Pikelny (banjo), Chris Eldridge (guitar), and Paul Kowert (bass). Their style has been described as "bluegrass instrumentation and spontaneity in the strictures of modern classical" as well as "American country-classical chamber music".

The band's 2018 album All Ashore was awarded the Grammy Award for Best Folk Album at the 61st Grammy Awards on February 10, 2019.

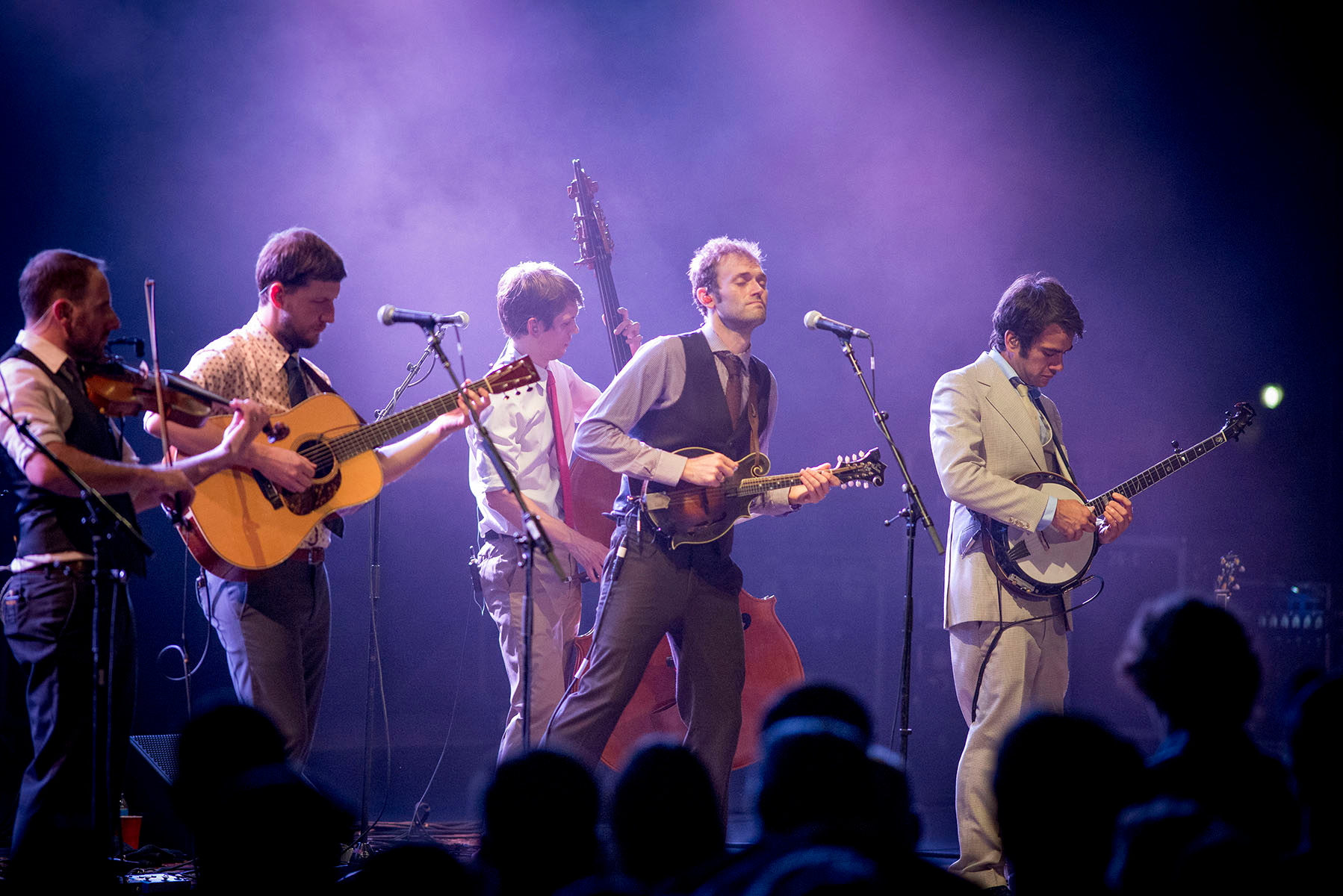
Punch Brothers, NC Museum of Art, July 16, 2015. Photo by Julianne G. Macie

== History ==
=== 2006–2007: Beginnings ===
Thile formed the band in 2006 to record the album How to Grow a Woman from the Ground. In an interview with the Nashville City Paper, Thile described the formation of the band:

We got together one night just to drop a ton of money, drink too much wine, eat steaks, and commiserate about our failed relationships. We had gotten to play together a few days before and we had said that we needed to do something musical together. With our hearts smashed to pieces, it became more urgent — our lives had gone the same way for so long. I knew I wanted to have a band with Gabe [Witcher], but I didn’t know if it would be a rock ensemble, an ambitious acoustic classical thing or a bluegrass group. We played, and there was a serious, instantaneous connection. Then I knew I wanted to put together a bluegrass band — one with a lot of range, but aesthetically a bluegrass band.

The band was initially known as The How to Grow a Band. In 2007, they officially changed their name, first to The Tensions Mountain Boys, before settling on Punch Brothers. The band's name comes from the critical line of an earworm jingle that is the centerpiece of Mark Twain's short story "A Literary Nightmare". The chorus of the jingle consists of two lines, "Punch, brothers! punch with care! Punch in the presence of the passenjare," which are said to be the mantra of railroad conductors.

What they formed was a type of group that American Songwriter magazine calls "A 21st century version of the Bluegrass Boys."

=== 2007–2009: "The Blind Leaving the Blind" and Punch ===
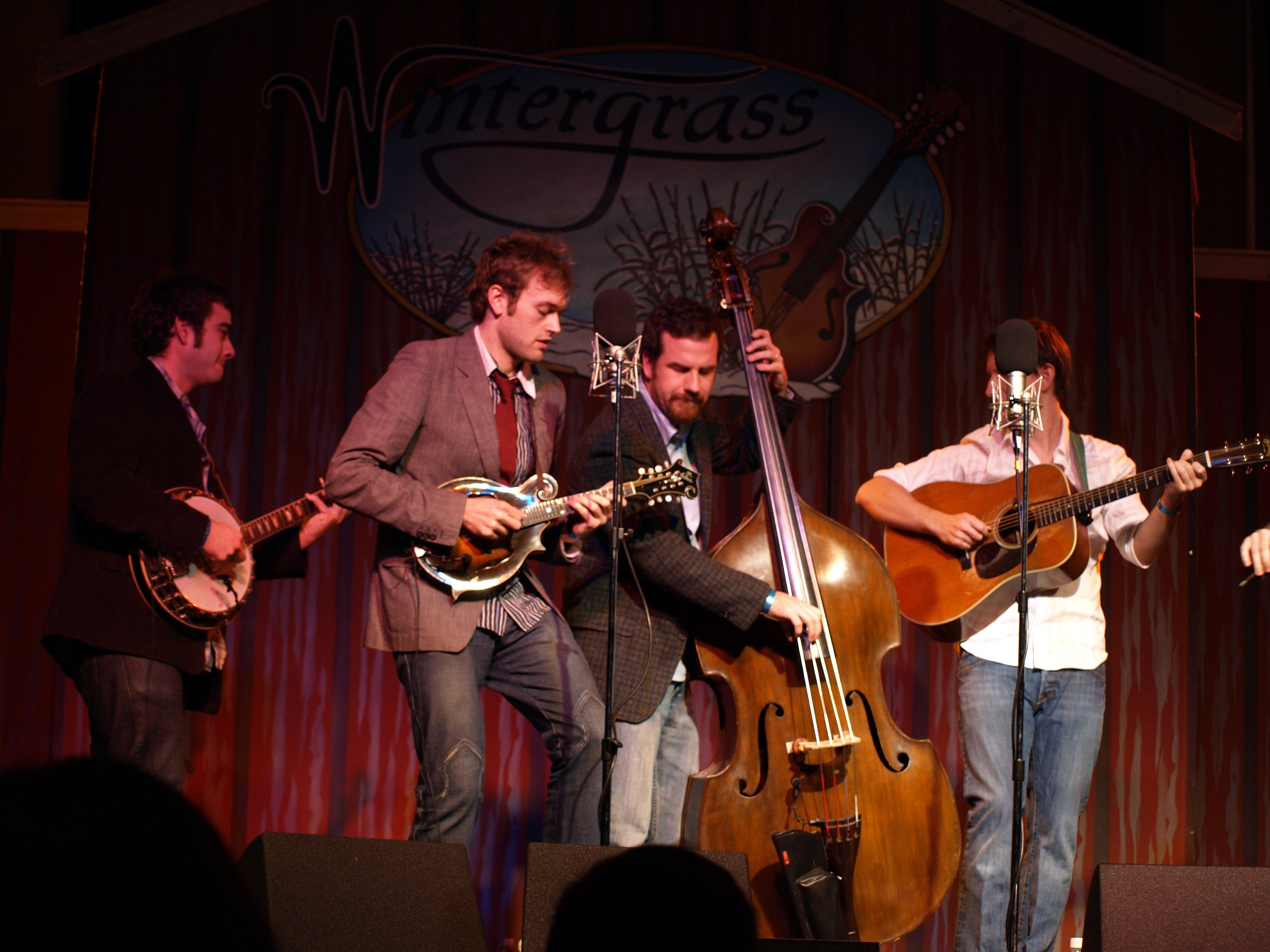
Noam Pikelny (banjo), Chris Thile (mandolin), Greg Garrison (bass), and Chris Eldridge (guitar) at Wintergrass, 2008

On March 17, 2007, this group debuted the ambitious forty-minute suite, "The Blind Leaving the Blind" at Carnegie Hall. The piece was composed by Thile, who said he wrote it in part to deal with his divorce in 2003.

On February 13, 2008, the band set off on their first national tour as Punch Brothers. On February 26, they released Punch, their first album, on Nonesuch Records. The album features Thile's suite "The Blind Leaving the Blind", as well as other original songs.

In March 2008, when asked about a follow-up album, Thile said "there will definitely be another album." On November 8, 2008, the band announced on their website that they had parted ways with bass player Greg Garrison. Paul Kowert, who studied under Edgar Meyer at the Curtis Institute of Music, took Garrison's place as bass player.

=== 2010: Antifogmatic ===
Antifogmatic, Punch Brothers' second album, was released on June 15, 2010 and features both traditional bluegrass and newgrass styles on the ten-track listing. Though bassist Kowert had toured extensively with the band in support of Punch over the preceding two years, Antifogmatic is the first Punch Brothers album on which he appears.

=== 2011: How to Grow A Band documentary ===
The band is also the focus of the documentary How to Grow a Band, directed by Mark Meatto. It was filmed over a two-year period and, according to its website, "explores the tensions between individual talents and group identity, art and commerce, youth and wisdom". The film premiered at the 42nd Nashville Film Festival in Nashville, Tennessee on April 15, 2011. The film also screened as part of the 38th Annual Telluride Bluegrass Festival in June 2011.

=== 2012: Who's Feeling Young Now? and Ahoy! ===
The band released its third album, Who's Feeling Young Now?, in February 2012. Shortly afterwards, they contributed the song "Dark Days" to the soundtrack for the 2012 blockbuster The Hunger Games. In November 2012 they released Ahoy!, the 5-track EP companion to Who's Feeling Young Now? The EP consists of five songs that were not featured on the full-length release.

=== 2015: The Phosphorescent Blues and The Wireless ===
In November 2014, the band released the first single, entitled "I Blew It Off," from their then-untitled fourth album. In December 2014, the band announced that the new album, The Phosphorescent Blues, would be released on January 27, 2015, along with the immediate release of another new single, "Julep". Julep was nominated for Best American Roots Song at the 2016 Grammy Awards. The album reached the top 10 on the rock, folk, and bluegrass charts. On November 20, 2015, Punch Brothers released a 5-track EP, The Wireless.

=== 2018: All Ashore ===
On July 20, 2018, All Ashore was released as the band's fifth album. The album was self-produced and released on the Nonesuch Records label. According to Thile, the album is "a meditation on committed relationships in the present day, particularly in light of the current unsettled political climate—certainly the most unsettled one that anyone in the band has ever experienced. We were hoping we could create a thing that would be convincing as a complete thought, sort of a nine-movement or a nine-song thought, even though it's rangy in terms of what it's talking about and in the characters doing the talking."

All Ashore was awarded the Grammy Award for Best Folk Album at the 61st Grammy Awards on February 10, 2019.

=== 2022: Hell on Church Street ===
On September 28, 2021 Punch Brothers announced that their next studio album would be a re-imagining of Tony Rice's 1983 album Church Street Blues. The album, titled Hell on Church Street, released on January 14, 2022.

Rice's Church Street Blues was a solo folk reinterpretation of many classic songs, and the Punch Brothers said of their own reinterpretations "No record (or musician) has had a greater impact on us, and we felt compelled to cover it in its entirety, with the objective of interacting with it in the same spirit of respect-fueled adventure that Tony brought to each of its pre-existing songs.” The songs were recorded in November 2020, just weeks before Rice's death at age 69. Punch Brothers guitarist Chris Eldridge was a student of Rice's.

=== 2023 to 2025: The Energy Curfew Music Hour ===
On June 1st, 2023 Punch Brothers announced on social media that longtime band member Gabe Witcher would leave the band following their performance at that year's Telluride Bluegrass Festival, and Brittany Haas would join as their new fiddle player. In September of 2023, Audible announced a residency for Punch Brothers at the Minetta Lane Theatre in New York City. The project was a musical variety show called The Energy Curfew Music Hour, written by Chris Thile and Claire Coffee. The show would star Chris Thile as host and Punch Brothers as house band, featuring two musical guests every episode. The show was recorded live over eight performances from November 2023 to January 2024, and released on Audible and as a podcast in October 2024. A second season of six episodes was recorded in early 2025 and released the following October.

=== 2026: The Unsung Adventures of Punch Brothers ===
On April 21, 2026 Punch Brothers announced their next album, The Unsung Adventures of Punch Brothers, their first all-instrumental album. This would be the first record to feature Brittany Haas since joining the band in 2023. Produced by the band and engineered by Joseph Lorge, the album would feature eight original compositions by the band as well as three traditional arrangements. The album was released digitally and on CD and Vinyl on July 24th, 2026. Many of the tracks were previously featured on tour and on The Energy Curfew Music Hour.

== Band members ==
=== Current members ===
- Chris Thile – mandolin, vocals, mandola, bouzouki
- Noam Pikelny – banjo, vocals, National steel-bodied guitar
- Chris Eldridge – guitar, vocals
- Paul Kowert – double bass, vocals (since 2008)
- Brittany Haas – fiddle (since 2023)

=== Former members ===
- Bryan Sutton – guitar, vocals (2006–2007)
- Greg Garrison – double bass, vocals (2006–2008)
- Gabe Witcher – fiddle, vocals, drums (2008–2023)

== Discography ==
=== Albums ===
Title	Release date	Label	Peak chart positions				
Title	Release date	Label	US Grass	US	US Heat	US Rock	US Folk
Punch	February 26, 2008	Nonesuch Records	1	—	10	—	—
Antifogmatic	June 15, 2010	Nonesuch Records	2	128	1	39	2
Who's Feeling Young Now?	February 14, 2012	Nonesuch Records	1	76	—	19	5
Ahoy! EP	November 13, 2012	Nonesuch Records	1	144	—	42	7
The Phosphorescent Blues	January 27, 2015	Nonesuch Records	1	37	—	9	4
The Wireless EP	November 20, 2015	Nonesuch Records	1	—	—	34	9
All Ashore	July 20, 2018	Nonesuch Records	1	—	—	48	8
Hell on Church Street	January 14, 2022	Nonesuch Records	—	—	—	—	—
The Unsung Adventures of Punch Brothers	July 24, 2026	Nonesuch Records	2	—	—	—	—
"—" denotes releases that did not chart

=== Music videos ===
Year	Video	Director
2013	"Movement and Location"	Danny Clinch
2018	"It's All Part of the Plan"	Alex Chaloff
