= Thanks for Listening (Chris Thile album) =

Studio album by Chris Thile
- Released: December 8, 2017
- Recorded: July 2017
- Studio: Reservoir Studios, NYC
- Length: 43:03
- Label: Nonesuch Records
- Producer: Thomas Bartlett

Chris Thile chronology
Bach: Sonatas and Partitas, Vol. 1 (2013)	Thanks for Listening (2017)

Professional ratings
Aggregate scores
Source	Rating
AnyDecentMusic?	6.7/10
Metacritic	72/100
Review scores
Source	Rating
AllMusic	3.5/5 stars
Daily Express	4/5 stars
The Guardian	3/5 stars
The Independent	3/5 stars
The Irish Times	4/5 stars
Mojo	3/5 stars
PopMatters	9/10
Spectrum Culture	4/5 stars
Record Collector	3/5 stars
Uncut	3.5/5 stars

Thanks for Listening is the seventh full-length studio album by American mandolinist Chris Thile. The album was released via Nonesuch Records label on December 8, 2017.

== Reception ==
At Metacritic, that assigns a normalized rating out of 100 to reviews from mainstream critics, the album received an average score of 72, based on six reviews, which indicates "generally favorable reviews". At AnyDecentMusic?, that collates critical reviews from more than 50 media sources, the album scored 6.7 points out of 10.

Jeff Tamarkin of Relix stated "Thanks for Listening is a compendium of 10 of those newly penned songs, rerecorded in the studio and presented as something of an overview of where he is as a performer and composer these days, and doubling as an invitation to check out how he’s remodeled the place. Thile’s approach ranges from the minimalist, solo “Balboa” to the supersized, urban love-letter “Thank You, New York” to “Feedback Loop,” a commentary on our social media addiction that could pass as a lost Simon & Garfunkel classic. Throughout, of course, Thile's virtuosic mandolin shines, but here, he's got a greater goal than reminding us that he is peerless on the instrument—with Thanks for Listening, Thile is both extending his sincere gratitude to us for coming along on his ride and laying down tracks toward wherever this might take him."

David McGee of The Absolute Sound noted "Very much a meditative, singer-songwriter affair, Thank You for Listening finds Chris Thile offering bromides to a society roiled by political, social media, and cultural upheavals in 2017. Playing almost all the stringed instruments himself—with the mandolin employed in an Impressionistic manner—and joined vocally on occasion by Sarah Jarosz, Aoife O’Donovan, and Gaby Moreno, Thile gracefully, nay ethereally, serves up ten songs he wrote last year for A Prairie Home Companion. So composed is he in his task that listeners may miss the seething undercurrent fueling lyrics inveighing against the alienating dangers of social media in the echo-laced “Feedback Loop” but will have no trouble identifying the object of derisive barbs hurled in the more muscular “Falsetto” (“Froggy thinks his whistle is the Liberty Bell,” for one)."

== Track listing ==
All tracks are written by Chris Thile.

No.	Title	Length
1.	"I Made This for You"	4:10
2.	"Feedback Loop"	4:10
3.	"Elephant in the Room"	2:32
4.	"Douglas Fir" (feat. Aoife O'Donovan)	4:26
5.	"Thank You, New York" (feat. Gaby Moreno)	4:53
6.	"Stanley Ann"	5:11
7.	"Modern Friendship" (feat. Sarah Jarosz)	4:36
8.	"Falsetto"	4:57
9.	"Balboa"	3:57
10.	"Thanks for Listening"	4:19
Total length:		43:03

== Personnel ==
Band

- Chris Thile – producer, strings, vocals
- Ted Poor – drums
- Aoife O'Donovan – vocals
- Gaby Moreno – vocals
- Sarah Jarosz – vocals
- Thomas Bartlett – engineer, keyboards, producer
- Alan Hampton – bass (electric), double bass
- Nadia Sirota – viola

Production

- James Yost – engineer
- Oliver Jeffers – back cover, over illustration
- Robert Hurwitz – executive producer
- Patrick Dillett – engineer, mixing
- Greg Calbi – mastering
