= Noam Pikelny =

American banjo player (born 1981)

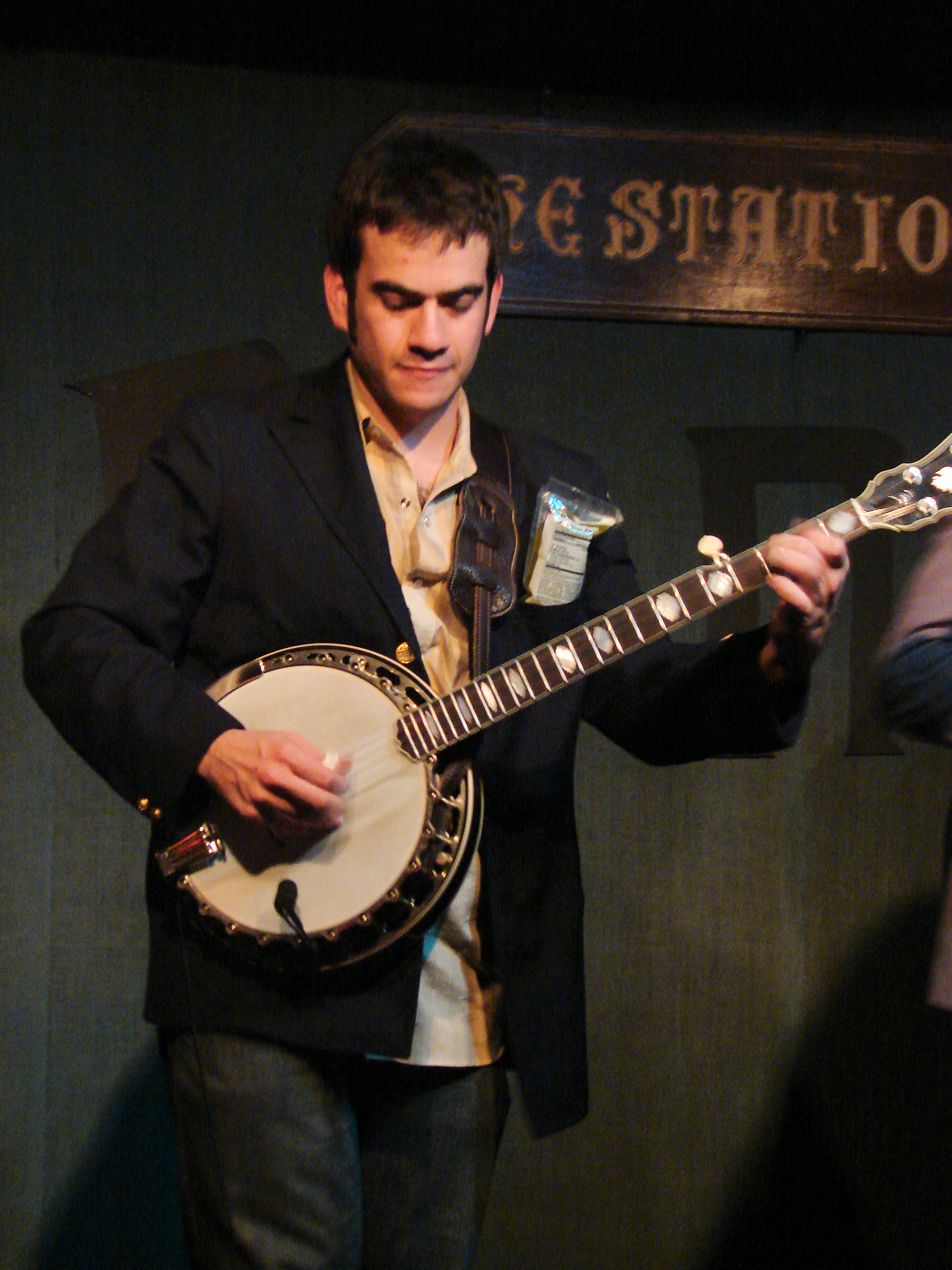
- Noam Pikelny 2017

Background information
- Born: February 27, 1981 (age 45)
- Origin: Chicago, Illinois
- Genres: Progressive bluegrass Bluegrass
- Instrument: Banjo
- Labels: Compass Records, Rounder Records
- Member of: Punch Brothers
- Formerly of: Leftover Salmon; Caitlin Canty
- Spouse: Caitlin Canty (m. 2018)
- Website: noampikelny.com

Noam David Pikelny (/ˈnoʊəm pɪˈkɛlni/, NO-əm pih-KEL-nee; born February 27, 1981) is an American banjoist. He is a member of the groups Punch Brothers, Mighty Poplar and was previously in Leftover Salmon as well as the John Cowan Band. Pikelny is a nine-time Grammy Award nominee, winning once in 2019 for Best Folk Album as part of Punch Brothers.

== Early life, family and education ==
Pikelny was born in Chicago, Illinois, and raised in nearby Skokie, Illinois. He started playing banjo when he was 8 years old. He took lessons at Chicago's Old Town School of Folk Music. In high school, he began studying with Greg Cahill of the Chicago bluegrass band The Special Consensus.

== Career ==
Pikelny started playing the banjo at the age of 8, inspired by his older brother playing the mandolin and his parents' suggestion. He started in the clawhammer style of banjo playing, but switched to three finger Scruggs-style bluegrass after listening to an album by Bela Fleck and the Flecktones.

Pikelny was in the music group Leftover Salmon from 2002 until leaving in 2004 to play in the John Cowan Band from 2004 to 2006, playing on the band's "New Tattoo" record, just before the formation of Punch Brothers in that same year. Chris Thile of Nickel Creek was planning to form a string quintet, but did not know what direction he wanted to take it, except that he wanted it to include fiddler Gabe Witcher.

After Thile had a jam session with Witcher, Pikelny, bassist Greg Garrison and guitarist Chris Eldridge, he decided he wanted the band to be a quintet. The band was called "The How to Grow a Band" in 2006 when they were the backing band on Thile's solo release How to Grow a Woman from the Ground, as well as the following supporting shows. After on and off touring throughout 2007 coinciding with Nickel Creek's Farewell (For Now) Tour, the band's name was changed to the "Tensions Mountain Boys" briefly, and subsequently to Punch Brothers (borrowed from a short story by Mark Twain). Punch Brothers released Punch, their first official album as a band, on Nonesuch Records on February 26, 2008.

== Awards ==
Pikelny was the recipient of the 2010 Steve Martin Prize for Excellence in Banjo and Bluegrass. On November 5, 2010, he appeared on Late Show with David Letterman playing a comedic version of "Dueling Banjos" alongside Martin, and he later performed with Martin and Punch Brothers. Pikelny's 2011 album Beat the Devil and Carry a Rail was nominated for Best Bluegrass Album in the 2013 Grammy Awards.

In 2014 at the International Bluegrass Music Awards he was named banjo player of the year by the International Bluegrass Music Association; he received it again in 2017. He also received the album of the year award for Noam Pikelny Plays Kenny Baker Plays Bill Monroe - the same album that would be nominated for "Best Bluegrass Album" at the Grammy Awards in 2015.

In 2019 Punch Brothers won a Grammy Award for Best Folk Album for their album All Ashore.

In 2025, Pikelny was inducted into the American Banjo Museum Hall of Fame under the Five-String Performance category.

== Personal life ==
In 2018, Pikelny married American singer-songwriter, Caitlin Canty. The couple relocated from Nashville, Tennessee to Vermont, after the birth of their first child in 2020. Their second child was born in 2024.

Pikelny is Jewish. He is a fan of the Chicago Cubs baseball team, and the name of his song Waveland comes from the address of the Wrigley Field stadium where the team won the 2016 World Series. He is also color blind.

== Discography ==
=== Solo recordings ===
Title	Album details	Peak chart positions	
Title	Album details	US Grass	US Heat
In the Maze	Release date: July 20, 2004; Label: Compass Records	—	—
Beat the Devil and Carry a Rail	Release date: October 25, 2011; Label: Compass Records	3	27
Noam Pikelny Plays Kenny Baker Plays Bill Monroe	Release date: October 1, 2013; Label: Compass Records	2	21
Universal Favorite	Release date: March 3, 2017; Label: Rounder Records	2	–
"—" denotes releases that did not chart

=== Leftover Salmon ===
Year	Title	Label
2003	O' Cracker Where Art Thou	Pitch-a-Tent
2004	Leftover Salmon	Compendia

=== Punch Brothers ===
Year	Title	Label
2006	How to Grow a Woman from the Ground	Sugar Hill
2008	Punch	Nonesuch
2010	Antifogmatic	Nonesuch
2012	Who's Feeling Young Now?	Nonesuch
2015	The Phosphorescent Blues	Nonesuch
2018	All Ashore	Nonesuch
2022	Hell on Church Street	Nonesuch

=== Mighty Poplar ===
Year	Title	Label
2023	Mighty Poplar	Mighty Poplar / Free Dirt Records

=== Caitlin Canty ===
Year	Title	Label
2018	Motel Bouquet	Caitlin Canty / Tone Tree Music
2020	Quiet Flame	Caitlin Canty / Tone Tree Music
