= Chris Thile =

American mandolinist and singer-songwriter (born 1981)

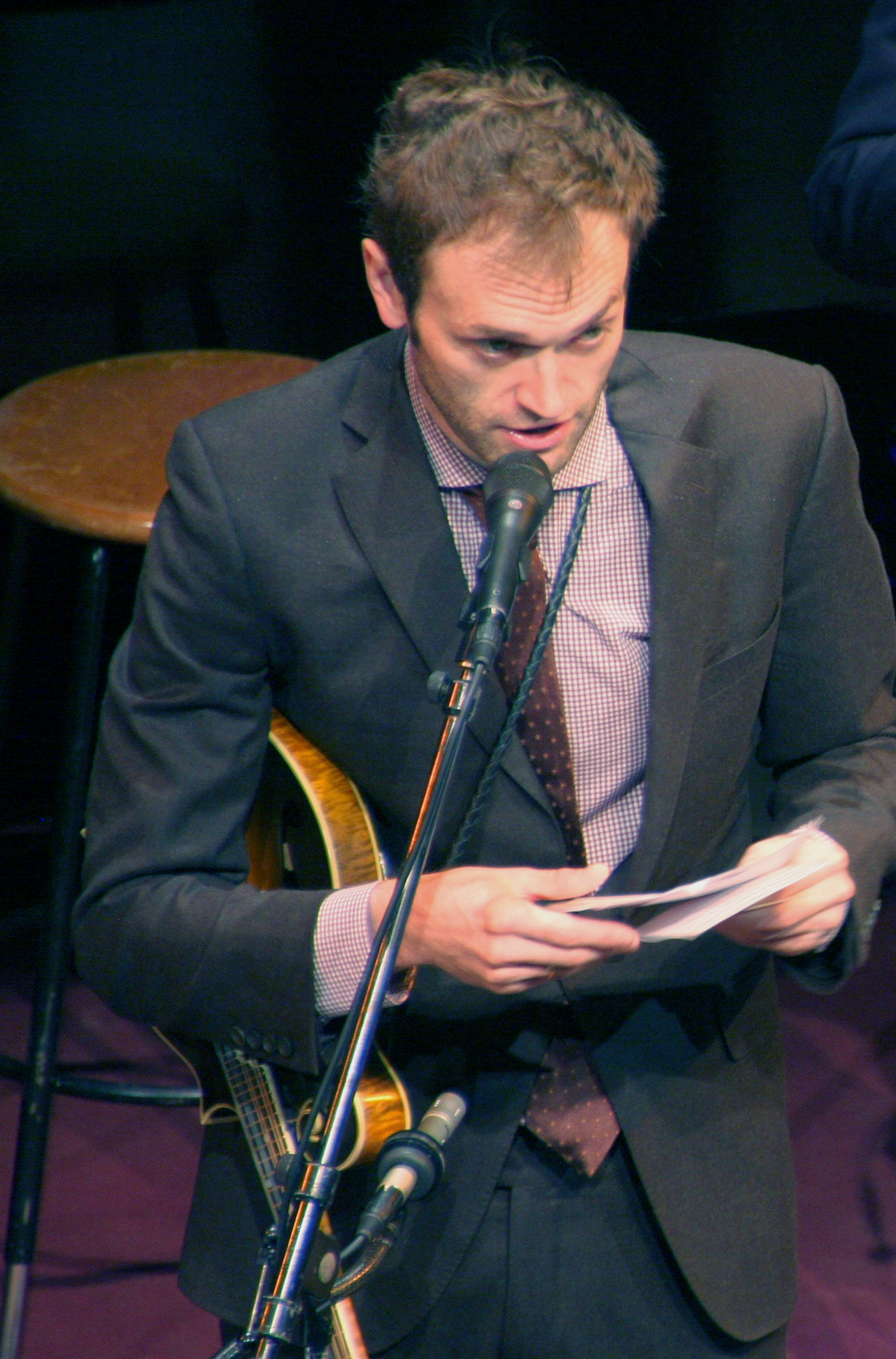
- Thile hosting A Prairie Home Companion in 2016

Background information
- Born: Christopher Scott Thile; February 20, 1981 (age 45); Oceanside, California, U.S.
- Genres: Bluegrass; progressive bluegrass; folk; country; classical; jazz
- Occupations: Singer-songwriter; musician; composer; radio show host
- Instruments: Mandolin; vocals; bouzouki; guitar; violin
- Years active: 1989–present
- Labels: Sugar Hill; Nonesuch
- Member of: Punch Brothers; Nickel Creek
- Spouses: Jesse Meighan (m. 2003; div. 2004); Claire Coffee (m. 2013)
- Website: www.christhile.com

Christopher Scott Thile (/ˈθiːli/; THEE-lee, born February 20, 1981) is an American singer-songwriter, musician, composer, and radio personality, best known for his work in the progressive acoustic trio Nickel Creek and the acoustic folk and progressive bluegrass quintet Punch Brothers. He is a 2012 MacArthur Fellow. From 2016 to its cancellation in 2020, he hosted the radio variety show Live from Here.

== Biography ==
The three members of Nickel Creek met in 1989 at That Pizza Place in Carlsbad, California, listening to weekly bluegrass shows with their parents. Their first album, Little Cowpoke, was released on December 31, 1993. Later albums included Nickel Creek and This Side, which went platinum and won a Grammy for Best Contemporary Folk Album, respectively. In 2005, Nickel Creek released Why Should the Fire Die?, which received critical acclaim and sold 250,000 units.

Thile has also released solo albums, including Not All Who Wander Are Lost (2001) and Deceiver (2004), on which he wrote, composed, sang, and played every part. In 2008, Thile released a collaboration album with bassist Edgar Meyer; he has also collaborated with musicians Hilary Hahn, Béla Fleck, and Brad Mehldau.

=== Personal life ===
In 2003, Thile married fashion designer Jesse Meighan. The couple divorced in 2004, after 18 months of marriage.

Thile married actress Claire Coffee on December 23, 2013. Coffee and Thile have a son named Calvin Eugene Thile, born on May 15, 2015.

== History ==
=== 1981–2000: Early life and career ===
Thile was born in Oceanside, California, in 1981, into a musical family. His father had been accepted into the New England Conservatory of Music but abandoned that in order to maintain a relationship with Thile's mother; he supported the family as a piano technician. On Thile's mother's side, many family members were professional musicians, including multiple piano tutors, an aunt who was a longtime cellist with the Ottawa Symphony Orchestra, and a grandfather who was a composer and collegiate music professor.

Thile's earliest memories of music are listening to Stan Getz's recording of "The Girl from Ipanema" before he even turned one year old. When he was two, his family started going to That Pizza Place, where he listened to John Moore's band Bluegrass Etc. When Thile was four, his family moved to Idyllwild, California.

Thile began playing the mandolin at the age of five, taking occasional lessons from John Moore. At age eight, Thile's family and the Watkins family formed Nickel Creek. The band performed at many California bluegrass festivals, and as a result Chris had to be home-schooled. At age twelve, he won the mandolin championship at the Walnut Valley Festival in Winfield, Kansas.

All three members of Nickel Creek grew up fundamentalist Christian, an upbringing that Thile describes as having "beautiful aspects" and also being "difficult for us." He reflected in 2025: "It can be hard to pursue a life of creativity if you're being taught that there is always a right and wrong way of doing things, and that your way is right and anyone who believes something else is wrong."

Also in 1993, Thile made a demo tape and sent it to the Sugar Hill and Rounder record labels. Both labels showed interest, but the Thiles went with Sugar Hill. The next year, Chris Thile released his first solo album, Leading Off, featuring mostly original compositions.

In 1995, the Thile family moved to Murray, Kentucky, where Chris's father Scott Thile accepted a position at Murray State University as a musical instrument technician. In 1997, Chris released Stealing Second and Nickel Creek released Here to There. Chris went on to attend Murray State University for a few semesters, where he was a music major. In 2000, he went to Nashville to play mandolin on Dolly Parton's bluegrass/Appalachian folk album Little Sparrow.

=== 2001–2005: Wander and Deceiver ===
Following the major success of the album Nickel Creek, Thile released Not All Who Wander Are Lost in 2001. The album featured guest appearances from several well-known instrumentalists such as Stuart Duncan, Béla Fleck, Edgar Meyer, Jerry Douglas, and Bryan Sutton.

In 2003, Thile teamed up with mandolinist Mike Marshall for the duet album Into the Cauldron, which included original pieces as well as pieces by Charlie Parker and J. S. Bach. Also in 2003, Thile joined Mark O'Connor for his double CD set "Thirty-Year Retrospective" which was nominated for a Grammy. In 2004, Thile released Deceiver, an experimental album on which he recorded every track himself. This included electric guitar, piano, drums, violin, viola, cello, and bass. Deceiver demonstrated some pop/rock songwriting in addition to "newgrass".

=== 2006–present: Punch Brothers and Edgar Meyer project ===
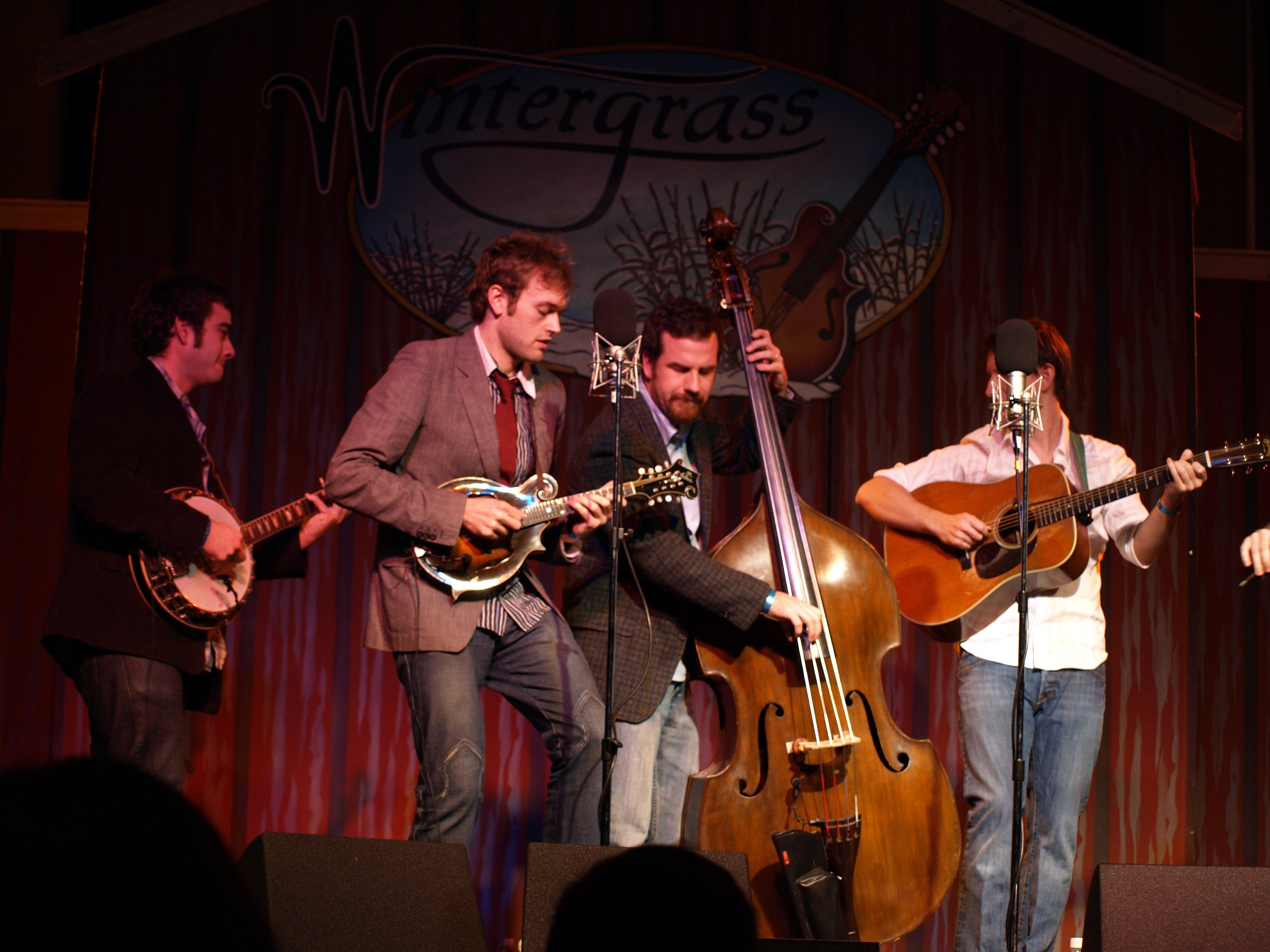
Chris Thile with Punch Brothers at Wintergrass, 2008

In August 2006, Nickel Creek announced that at the end of the year, they would no longer be recording together as a group, and their tour scheduled through 2007 would be their last for an indefinite period of time. In February 2014, the group announced that it would be releasing another album.

Thile was a judge for the fifth annual Independent Music Awards to support independent artists' careers.

In 2006, Thile formed How to Grow a Band, with whom he recorded How to Grow a Woman from the Ground, Thile's fifth album. In an interview with the Nashville City Paper, Thile described the band's formation:

We got together one night just to drop a ton of money, drink too much wine, eat steaks, and commiserate about our failed relationships. We had gotten to play together a few days before and we had said that we needed to do something musical together. With our hearts smashed to pieces, it became more urgent – our lives had gone the same way for so long. I knew I wanted to have a band with Gabe [Witcher], but I didn't know if it would be a rock ensemble, an ambitious acoustic classical thing or a bluegrass group. We played, and there was a serious, instantaneous connection. Then I knew I wanted to put together a bluegrass band – one with a lot of range, but aesthetically a bluegrass band.

The band consisted of Chris Thile (mandolin), Gabe Witcher (fiddle/violin), Chris Eldridge (guitar), Greg Garrison (bass), and Noam Pikelny (banjo). Bryan Sutton has also filled in on guitar when necessary while Eldridge played out commitments to The Infamous Stringdusters. In 2007, the band officially changed its name first to "The Tensions Mountain Boys" and then "Punch Brothers".

On March 17, 2007, at Carnegie Hall, this group debuted Thile's ambitious "The Blind Leaving the Blind", a 40-minute suite in four movements that Thile told NPR was written in part to deal with his 2004 divorce.

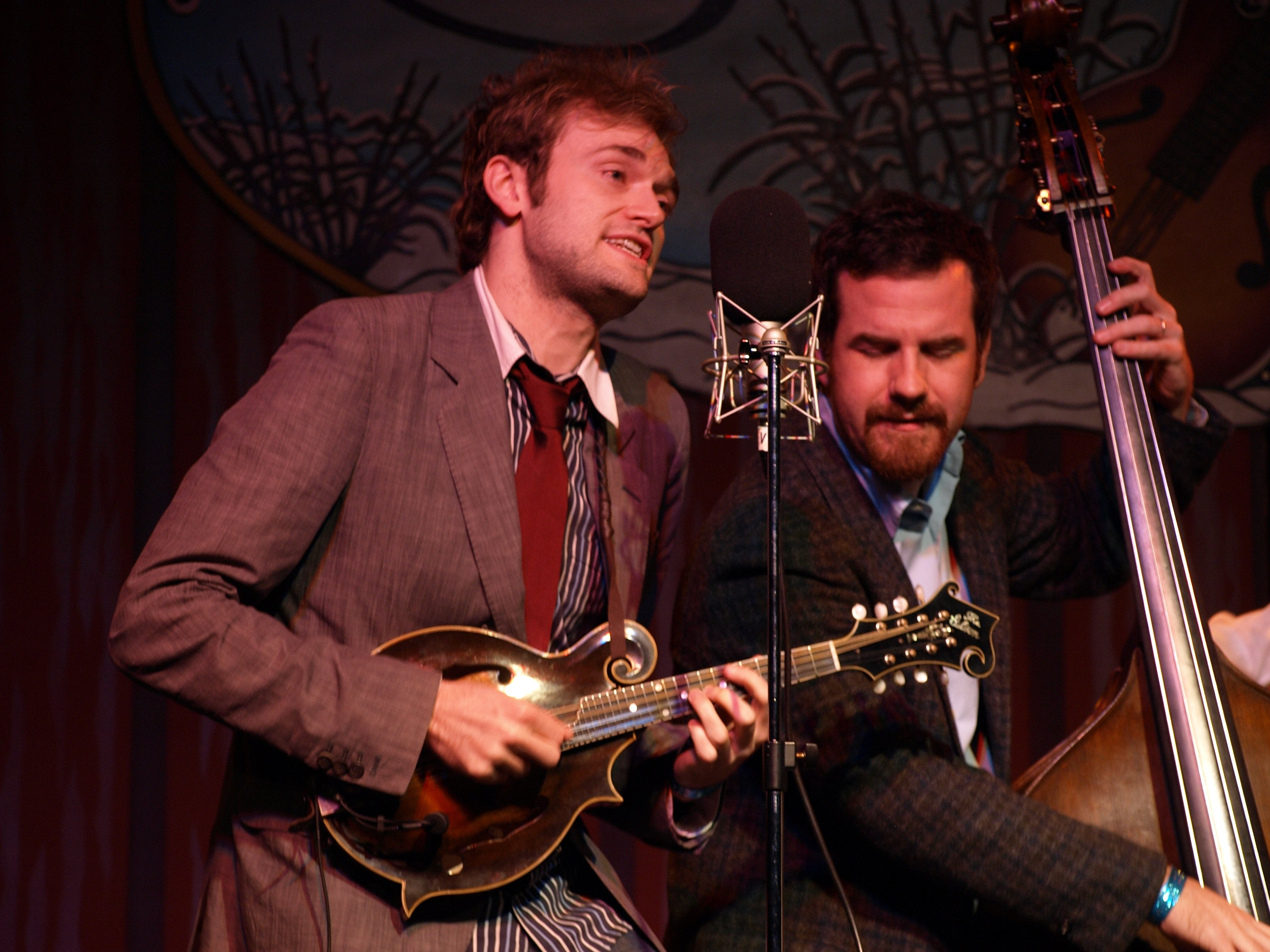
Chris Thile with Punch Brothers at Wintergrass, 2008

Punch Brothers released its first album, "Punch", February 26, 2008, on Nonesuch Records. The album featured Thile's suite "The Blind Leaving the Blind", as well as other original songs.

To promote "Punch", Thile and Punch Brothers planned a year-long tour in 2008, as well as a February 29 appearance on The Tonight Show with Jay Leno. In late 2008, Paul Kowert replaced Garrison on bass. Punch Brothers released Antifogmatic on February 15, 2010, and continued to tour. On November 5, 2010, the band performed "Rye Whiskey" on the Late Show with David Letterman with Steve Martin guesting on banjo.

Punch Brothers released their third album, Who's Feeling Young Now?, in early 2012.

In November 2014, Punch Brothers released a single titled "I Blew It Off", from their then-untitled fourth album. In December 2014, the band announced the scheduled release of an upcoming album and simultaneous release of another new single, "Julep".

In August 2008, Thile and bassist Edgar Meyer announced the release date of the duo's planned debut album. The album was released on Thile's label Nonesuch Records on September 23, 2008. Commenting on the collaboration, Thile said: "Edgar is one of the biggest influences on my musical life, and now I'm in a duo with him and writing songs with him. This was my dream. I always wondered what it would be like to be playing music this hard." The duo toured in September and October 2008 to promote the album.

In 2012, Thile won a MacArthur Fellowship.

In 2014, Thile recorded a new collaborative album with Edgar Meyer titled Bass & Mandolin and embarked on a tour with Meyer to support the album.

Also in 2014, Thile reunited with Nickel Creek to release a new album called A Dotted Line in celebration of their 25th anniversary. The group also embarked on a national tour titled NC25.

Punch Brothers released The Phosphorescent Blues, their fourth album, and The Wireless EP in 2015. They also released their fifth and sixth albums, All Ashore (album) and Hell on Church Street, in 2018 and 2022 respectively.

=== Side projects ===
David Grisman, Chris Thile and Enrique Coria at the Grey Fox Bluegrass Festival in 1998

Thile is featured in the documentary Bluegrass Journey, along with the rest of Nickel Creek. He has also appeared on a number of other artists' recordings, including Béla Fleck's Perpetual Motion, playing arrangements of Baroque, Impressionist, Classical and other styles of music with Fleck and Edgar Meyer; Jam Session, with Mark O'Connor, Frank Vignola, Bryan Sutton, and Jon Burr; the Dixie Chicks' Home, Kate Rusby's Awkward Annie, Julie Fowlis's Cuilidh, Dolly Parton's Little Sparrow, Dierks Bentley's Up on the Ridge, Jacob Collier's "Djesse Vol. 2", and Sarah Jarosz's Song Up in Her Head and Follow Me Down.

Thile has performed as a duo with guitarist and vocalist Michael Daves since 2005. They released their debut album, Sleep With One Eye Open, on May 10, 2011. Recorded at Jack White's studio, the album consists of 16 classic bluegrass duets. Jack White also produced and played on the duo's 7" vinyl record Man in the Middle on Third Man Records. Thile and Daves met in 2005 at a bluegrass jam at NYC's Baggot Inn.

In 2009 Thile completed a mandolin concerto titled Ad astra per alas porci. The work was commissioned by a consortium of orchestras including the Colorado Symphony Orchestra, Los Angeles Chamber Orchestra, Oregon Symphony, Alabama Symphony Orchestra, Winston-Salem Symphony, Delaware Symphony Orchestra, Portland Symphony Orchestra, and Interlochen Center for the Arts. Thile performed the world premiere of the first movement with the Interlochen Arts Camp World Youth Symphony Orchestra under director Jung-Ho Pak, and premiered his entire concerto with the Colorado Symphony Orchestra on September 17, 2009.

In 2011, he recorded The Goat Rodeo Sessions with cellist Yo-Yo Ma, bassist Edgar Meyer and fiddle player Stuart Duncan. On October 25, 2011, he appeared on the Tonight Show as a member of the Yo-Yo Ma and Friends musical act. On June 19, 2020, the same group of musicians released a second album titled Not Our First Goat Rodeo.

Thile released a solo album titled Bach: Sonatas and Partitas, Vol. 1 in June 2013. The work comprises three works by Johann Sebastian Bach written for solo violin: Sonata No. 1 in G minor, BWV 1001; Partita No. 1 in B minor, BWV 1002; and Sonata No. 2 in A minor, BWV 1003.

For 2018–19, Thile was named to the Richard and Barbara Debs Composer's Chair at Carnegie Hall.

In 2021 the artist was inter alia part of the Newport Folk Festival in July.

In 2024, Thile provided the singing voice and mandolin performance of Wendell in the Country Bear Musical Jamboree at Walt Disney World's Magic Kingdom.

=== A Prairie Home Companion / Live from Here ===
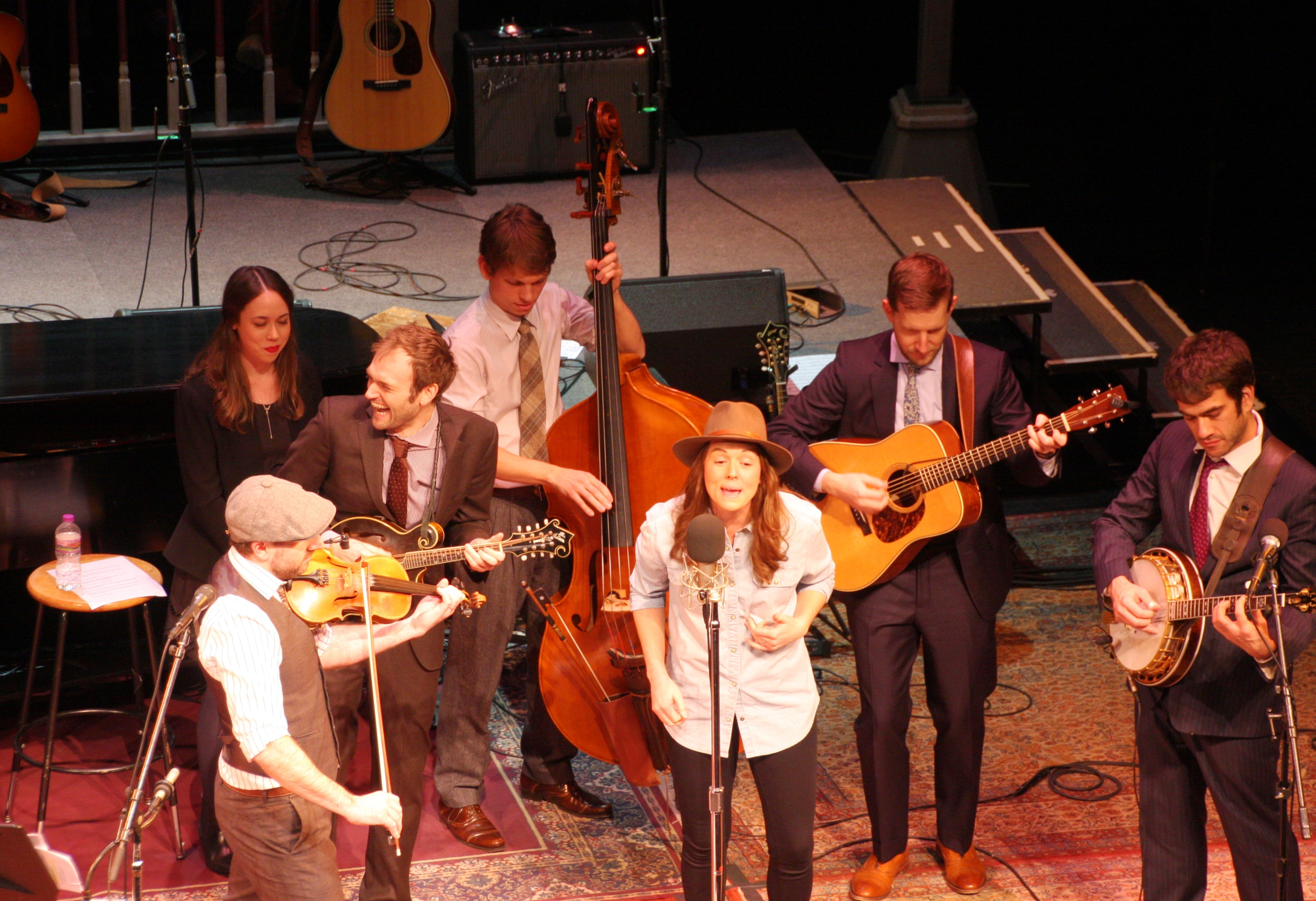
Thile hosting A Prairie Home Companion with guest Brandi Carlile

Thile made his first appearance on Garrison Keillor's radio show A Prairie Home Companion in 1996, at age 15 and has returned numerous times—as a solo artist, with Nickel Creek, and with Punch Brothers. On February 7 and 14 in 2015 and January 30 and February 6, 2016, he was the show's guest host. On July 21, 2015, Keillor officially announced that he was leaving the show and that Thile would succeed him as permanent host in 2016. Thile's first show as host took place on October 15, 2016, at the Fitzgerald Theater in St. Paul. On February 18, 2017, Thile announced that his version of the show had been renewed for another season. On December 16, 2017, at the Town Hall theater in New York, Thile announced that the show would be renamed Live from Here. The show continued airing live on public radio until its final show, on May 30, 2020. American Public Media, the producer of the show, halted production as a result of the COVID-19 pandemic's effect on shows with live audiences; on June 14, 2020, Minnesota Public Radio announced the show's cancellation.

== Awards and nominations ==
- 1996 – Nominated for Grammy Award for Best Country Instrumental Performance for "Scotland" from True Life Blues: The Songs of Bill Monroe
- 1997 – IBMA award for Album of the Year for True Life Blues: The Songs of Bill Monroe
- 2001 – IBMA award for Mandolinist of the Year
- 2002 – Won Grammy Award for Best Contemporary Folk Album for This Side (with Nickel Creek)
- 2005 – Nominated for Grammy Award for Best Engineered Album, Non-Classical for Deceiver
- 2006 – Nominated for Grammy Award for Best Country Instrumental Performance for "The Eleventh Reel"
- 2007 – BBC's Folk Musician of the Year
- 2007 – Nominated for IBMA Mandolinist of the Year
- 2008 – Nominated for Americana Music Association Instrumentalist of the Year
- 2012 – Nominated for Grammy Award for Best Bluegrass Album for Sleep with One Eye Open (with Michael Daves)
- 2012 – MacArthur Fellowship ($500,000 'Genius Grant')
- 2013 – Won Grammy Award for Best Folk Album for The Goat Rodeo Sessions (with Yo-Yo Ma, Stuart Duncan, and Edgar Meyer)
- 2014 – Won Grammy Award for Best Contemporary Instrumental Album for Bass & Mandolin (with Edgar Meyer)
- 2015 – Awarded Honorary Doctorate from The New School.
- 2019 – Won Grammy Award for Best Folk Album for All Ashore (with Punch Brothers)

== Discography ==
=== Solo ===
| Title | Album details | Peak chart positions | | | | | |
| Title | Album details | US | US Grass | US Country | US Indie | US Heat | US Classic |
|---|---|---|---|---|---|---|---|
| Leading Off | Release date: September 25, 1994; Label: Sugar Hill Records | — | — | — | — | — | — |
| Stealing Second | Release date: March 18, 1997; Label: Sugar Hill Records | — | 12 | — | — | — | — |
| Not All Who Wander Are Lost | Release date: October 9, 2001; Label: Sugar Hill Records | — | 13 | — | — | — | — |
| Deceiver | Release date: October 12, 2004; Label: Sugar Hill Records | — | 3 | — | — | — | — |
| How to Grow a Woman from the Ground | Release date: September 12, 2006; Label: Sugar Hill Records | — | 2 | 46 | 27 | 28 | — |
| Bach: Sonatas and Partitas, Vol. 1 | Release date: August 5, 2013; Label: Nonesuch Records | 72 | — | — | — | — | 1 |
| Thanks for Listening | Release date: December 8, 2017; Label: Nonesuch Records | — | — | — | — | — | — |
| Laysongs | Release date: June 4, 2021; Label: Nonesuch Records | — | — | — | — | — | — |
"—" denotes releases that did not chart.

=== Collaborations ===
| Title | Album details | Peak chart positions | | | | | |
| Title | Album details | US | US Grass | US Country | US Heat | US Classic | US Classic Crossover |
|---|---|---|---|---|---|---|---|
| Into the Cauldron (with Mike Marshall) | Release date: May 13, 2003; Label: Sugar Hill Records | — | 6 | 71 | — | — | — |
| Live: Duets (with Mike Marshall) | Release date: January 24, 2006; Label: Sugar Hill Records | — | 6 | — | — | — | 6 |
| Edgar Meyer and Chris Thile (with Edgar Meyer) | Release date: September 23, 2008; Label: Nonesuch Records | — | 3 | — | — | — | 3 |
| Sleep with One Eye Open (with Michael Daves) | Release date: May 10, 2011; Label: Nonesuch Records | — | 3 | 34 | 3 | — | — |
| The Goat Rodeo Sessions (with Yo-Yo Ma, Edgar Meyer and Stuart Duncan) | Release date: October 24, 2011; Label: Sony Masterworks | 18 | 1 | — | — | 1 | 1 |
| The Goat Rodeo Sessions: Live EP | Release date: February 7, 2012; Label: Sony Masterworks | — | 4 | — | — | 8 | 6 |
| The Auld Triangle (with Chris Eldridge, Marcus Mumford, Justin Timberlake and Gabe Witcher) | Release Date: November 12, 2013; Label: Warner Brothers Music Group | - | - | - | - | - | - |
| Bass & Mandolin (with Edgar Meyer) | Release date: September 9, 2014; Label: Nonesuch Records | — | 2 | — | — | 2 | 2 |
| Chris Thile & Brad Mehldau (with Brad Mehldau) | Release date: January 27, 2017; Label: Nonesuch Records | — | 1 | — | — | — | — |
| Not Our First Goat Rodeo (with Yo-Yo Ma, Edgar Meyer and Stuart Duncan) | Release date: June 19, 2020; Label: Sony Masterworks | — | 1 | — | — | 1 | 1 |
| "—" denotes releases that did not chart. | | | | | | | |

=== Punch Brothers ===
- 2008: Punch
- 2010: Antifogmatic
- 2012: Who's Feeling Young Now?
- 2012: Ahoy! [EP]
- 2015: The Phosphorescent Blues
- 2015: The Wireless [EP]
- 2018: All Ashore
- 2022: Hell on Church Street
- 2026: The Unsung Adventures of Punch Brothers

=== Mutual Admiration Society ===
- 2004 Mutual Admiration Society (Nickel Creek and Glen Phillips)

=== Theme park attractions ===
- 2024 Country Bear Musical Jamboree (Wendell)
