= Chris Eldridge =

American guitarist and singer (born 1982)

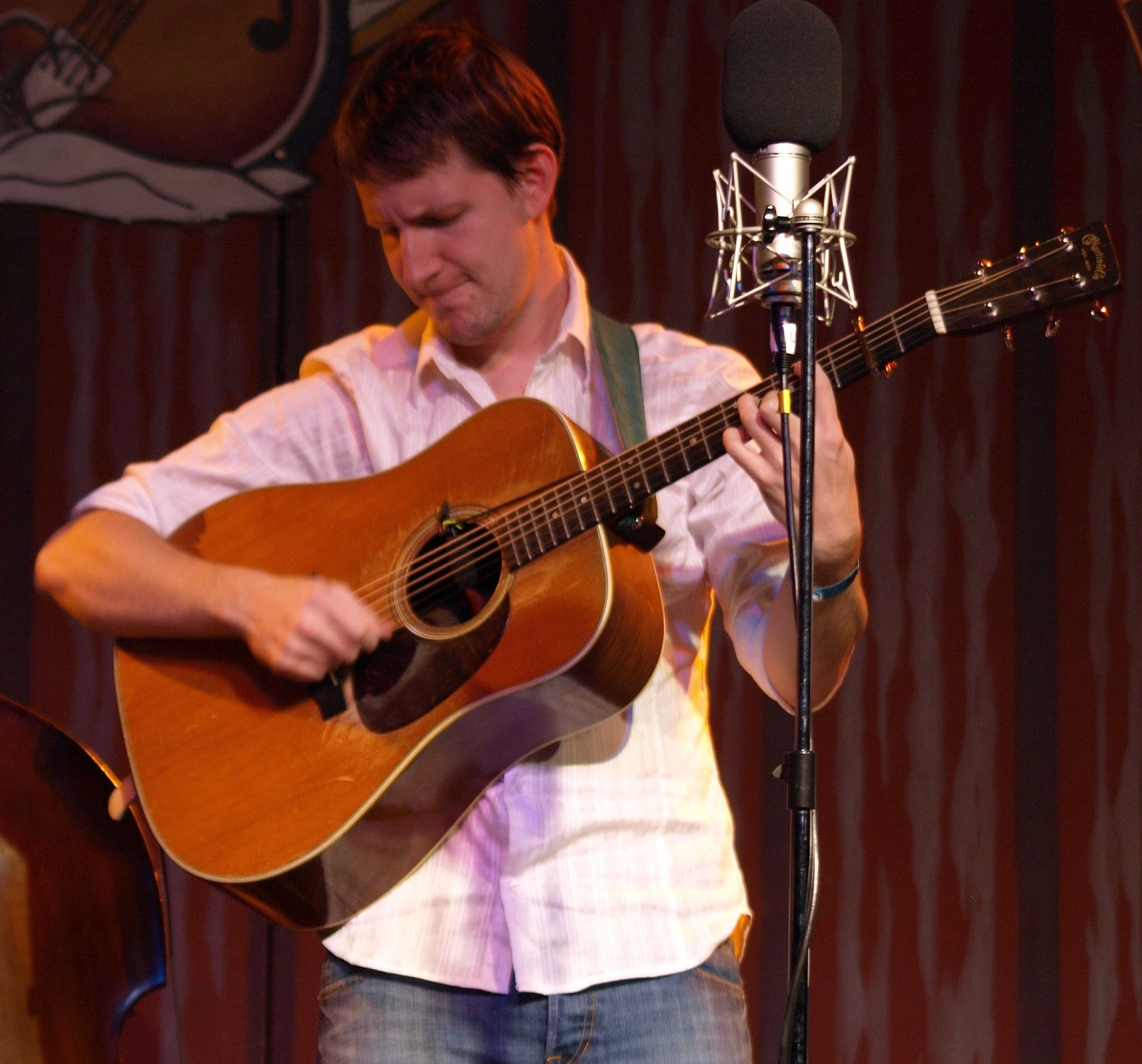
- Eldridge in 2008

Background information
- Born: June 27, 1982 (age 44)
- Origin: Fredericksburg, Virginia, U.S.
- Genres: Progressive bluegrass Bluegrass
- Instruments: Guitar, vocals
- Years active: 2000-present
- Label: Nonesuch Records
- Website: http://www.chriseldridge.net/

Chris "Critter" Eldridge (born June 27, 1982) is a Grammy Award winning American guitarist and singer. He is a member of Punch Brothers and frequently performs in a duo with fellow guitarist Julian Lage. He was the guitarist in the house band on Prairie Home Companion/Live From Here from 2016-2020. He was also a founding member of the bluegrass band The Infamous Stringdusters. His father is noted banjoist Ben Eldridge of the Seldom Scene. His nephew, Bryce Eldridge, is a highly touted prospect in the San Francisco Giants system in MLB.

== Biography ==
Chris Eldridge was born on June 27, 1982. Although initially drawn to electric guitar, Eldridge began developing an acoustic career by his mid-teens, largely due to his father, a founding member of the seminal bluegrass group The Seldom Scene. Eldridge later studied at Oberlin Conservatory, where he studied with guitarist Tony Rice. After graduating, he joined the Seldom Scene with whom he received a Grammy nomination in 2007. In 2005 he founded a critically acclaimed bluegrass group, The Infamous Stringdusters. At the 2007 International Bluegrass Music Association awards Eldridge and his Stringdusters bandmates won Emerging artist of the Year, Song of the Year, and Album of the Year for their debut album, Fork in the Road.

In 2005 mandolinist Chris Thile, recruited Eldridge, along with banjoist Noam Pikelny, violinist Gabe Witcher, and bassist Greg Garrison, to start working on an ambitious project fusing bluegrass instrumentation with the rigor of classical composition. Eventually the musicians decided to form a band, Punch Brothers. Their debut album in 2008, Punch, has been described as "bluegrass instrumentation and spontaneity in the strictures of modern classical" as well as "American country-classical chamber music". Punch Brothers has released 6 full-length albums and 2 EPs.

Eldridge appeared in the 2013 Coen brothers film Inside Llewyn Davis as Mike Timlin, the deceased duet partner of Llewyn Davis. Eldridge can be seen alongside Oscar Isaac several times throughout the movie on the front and back covers of Timlin and Davis' album, "If We Had Wings." Eldridge and Punch Brothers appeared throughout the movie's soundtrack.

Eldridge was featured in the exhibit, "American Currents: The Music of 2018" at the Country Music Hall of Fame and Museum in Nashville, Tennessee.

In 2019 Eldridge won the Instrumentalist of the Year award at the Americana Music Honors & Awards.

In 2020 he was named Visiting Associate Professor of Contemporary American Acoustic Music at Oberlin.

In 2023 he released an eponymous album with a new bluegrass supergroup called Mighty Poplar. Other members of the band include Noam Pikelny, Andrew Marlin, Alex Hargreaves and Greg Garrison.

Eldridge is a nine-time Grammy Award nominee, winning once in 2019 for Best Folk Album as part of Punch Brothers.

== Discography ==
=== Punch Brothers ===
Year	Title	Label
2008	Punch	Nonesuch
2010	Antifogmatic	Nonesuch
2012	Who's Feeling Young Now?	Nonesuch
2012	Ahoy! (EP)	Nonesuch
2015	The Phosphorescent Blues	Nonesuch
2015	The Wireless (EP)	Nonesuch
2018	All Ashore	Nonesuch
2022	Hell on Church Street	Nonesuch
2026	The Unsung Adventures of Punch Brothers	Nonesuch

=== Mighty Poplar ===
Year	Title	Label
2023	Mighty Poplar	Free Dirt Records

=== Julian Lage & Chris Eldridge ===
Year	Title	Label
2013	Close to Picture (EP)	Modern Lore
2014	Avalon	Modern Lore
2017	Mount Royal	Free Dirt Records

=== The Infamous Stringdusters ===
Year	Title	Label
2006	The Infamous Stringdusters (EP)	Sugar Hill
2007	Fork in the Road	Sugar Hill

=== Seldom Scene ===
Year	Title	Label
2007	Scenechronized	Sugar Hill
2014	Long Time... Seldom Scene	Smithsonian Folkways
