= Gabe Witcher =

American musician (born 1978)

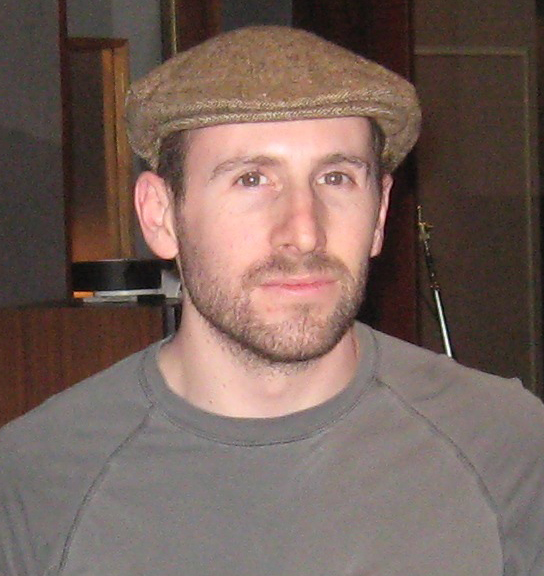
- Witcher in 2007

Background information
- Born: Gabriel Witcher; June 11, 1978 (age 48)
- Genres: Progressive bluegrass, bluegrass, Americana, Rock
- Instruments: Violin, guitar, drums, mandolin, bass, vocals
- Years active: 1984–present
- Label: Nonesuch
- Formerly of: Punch Brothers, Witcher Brothers

Gabriel Witcher (born June 11, 1978) is an American multi-instrumentalist, producer, composer, and arranger, best known as a fiddle player and singer. He is a founding member of the string ensemble Punch Brothers. Witcher and his fellow Punch Brothers won the 2019 Grammy for Best Folk Album and were named Affiliate Scholars of Oberlin Conservatory in 2014.

== History ==
Gabe Witcher began his performing career in 1984, at the age of six, at the Strawberry Music Festival in Yosemite when he was invited on stage by Bill Monroe to perform a duet in front of a workshop crowd. Later that day Witcher, along with his father, were invited to perform three songs on the main stage in between acts. This launched the formation of "The Witcher Brothers" which performed throughout the southwest United States for 25 years.

In 1993 Witcher contributed original compositions to the soundtrack of the 1993 film The Skateboard Kid. Many of these pieces he performed with his band, Trashkittens. This includes a music video rendition of the electric guitar–driven "Hard to Find", which ends the film.

In 1995 Witcher was asked to join the Laurel Canyon Ramblers, led by veteran bluegrass/country musician, Herb Pedersen, after their original fiddler Byron Berline relocated to a new city. He was with the Ramblers four years and recorded two albums with them.

In 1999, Witcher joined Béla Fleck's "The Bluegrass Sessions: Tales from the Acoustic Planet, Vol. 2" tour (filling in for fiddler Stuart Duncan) with Sam Bush, Jerry Douglas, Bryan Sutton and Mark Schatz. In 2002 Witcher joined Jerry Douglas' band and was a regular member until the formation of Punch Brothers in 2008.

Witcher spent 2005 working with Kenny Loggins and Jim Messina on the Loggins and Messina "Sittin' In Again" tour where he played fiddle, mandolin, dobro, and percussion as well as singing.

In 2010, he joined the Dave Rawlings Machine for two weeks of tour dates. The lineup consisted of Rawlings, Gillian Welch, two members of Old Crow Medicine Show, and Witcher.

He performed with Eve 6 on the Horrorscope tour (2000–2001) performing bass and backing vocals, allowing vocalist Max Collins more mobility onstage (Collins plays bass guitar on the album). He also performed on the track "Anytime" from the 2001 film Out Cold.

Witcher has appeared on film & television scores including as The Good Dinosaur, The Hunger Games: Mockingjay – Part 2, Inside Llewyn Davis, The Hunger Games, Brokeback Mountain, Cars, Toy Story, True Detective, Nashville, Better Call Saul, Sons of Anarchy and many others. He co-produced music with T Bone Burnett for the television shows Nashville and True Detective.

Witcher has one Grammy win and ten Grammy nominations. He had six nominations with Punch Brothers and four Grammy nominations as a producer: 2017 Best Bluegrass Album for Noam Pikelny's Universal Favorite, 2017 Best Contemporary Instrumental Album for Julian Lage & Chris Eldridge Mount Royal, 2015 Bluegrass Album of the Year for Noam Pikelny Plays Kenny Baker Plays Bill Monroe, and 2013 Bluegrass Album of the Year for Noam Pikelny's Beat the Devil and Carry a Rail, which also won "Album of the Year" at the IBMA Awards in 2014. He has also appeared on records by Paul Simon, Eric Clapton, Elton John, Beck, Willie Nelson, Neil Diamond, Fiona Apple, and Shania Twain.

Witcher has written arrangements for Elton John, Kronos Quartet, Punch Brothers, Rhiannon Giddens, Boston Pops, San Francisco Symphony, l'Orchestre Symphonique de Bretagne, North Carolina Symphony, The Secret Sisters, Nashville, and True Detective.

Witcher composed and arranged music for Red Dead Redemption 2 and was music director and conductor for the live performance of the score at the Red Bull Music Festival in Los Angeles in the Spring of 2019.

== Personal life ==
On September 15, 2013, Witcher married actress Mary Faber. They have two sons.

== Music Director ==
Sara Bareilles: Saturday Night Live, Ellen, Good Morning America, The Late Late Show w/ James Corden, The Talk, "Amidst The Chaos" Album Release Tour (2019)

The Music of Red Dead Redemption 2: Red Bull Music Festival Los Angeles (2019)

Kennedy Center presents: American Acoustic w Chris Thile – All Star Jam (2016)

Another Day, Another Time: f/ the music of Inside Llewyn Davis – Los Angeles (2013)

== Discography ==
=== Punch Brothers ===
Year	Title	Label
2008	Punch	Nonesuch
2010	Antifogmatic	Nonesuch
2012	Who's Feeling Young Now?	Nonesuch
2013	Ahoy!	Nonesuch
2015	The Phosphorescent Blues	Nonesuch
2015	The Wireless (EP)	Nonesuch
2018	All Ashore	Nonesuch
2022	Hell on Church Street	Nonesuch

=== Christina Courtin ===
Year	Title	Label
2009	Christina Courtin	Nonesuch Records

=== Jerry Douglas ===
Year	Title	Label
2006	The Best Kept Secret	Koch

=== Laurel Canyon Ramblers ===
Year	Title	Label
1996	Blue Rambler 2	Sugar Hill Records
1998	Back on the Street Again	Sugar Hill Records

== Credits ==
=== Albums ===
† Grammy Award Winner ^ Grammy Award Nomination

Artist	Project	Role
Paul Simon	So Beautiful or So What	Fiddle
	Stranger to Stranger	Fiddle, Vocals
Eric Clapton	Old Sock	Fiddle
Elton John	Wonderful Crazy Night	Arranger, Conductor
Willie Nelson	The Great Divide	Fiddle
Neil Diamond	Dreams	Fiddle
Beck	Return of the Grievous Angel	Fiddle
Shania Twain	Now	Fiddle
Rosanne Cash	The River & the Thread †	Fiddle
Fiona Apple/Jon Brion	So Sleepy	Fiddle
Emmylou Harris	Return of the Grievous Angel	Fiddle
Merle Haggard	Chicago Wind	Fiddle
John Denver	All Aboard†	Fiddle
Bette Midler	It's the Girls!	Fiddle
Punch Brothers/ VariousArtists	Another Day, Another Time	Fiddle, Vocals
Dierks Bentley	Up on the Ridge ^	Fiddle
The Chieftains	Voice of Ages	Fiddle
Eddy Mitchell	Heros, Jumbalaya	Fiddle
Johnny Hallyday	Rester Vivant	Fiddle
Travis Tritt	The Storm	Fiddle
Lee Ann Womack	Something Worth Leaving Behind	Fiddle
Dwight Yoakam	Dwights Used Records	Fiddle
Sara Watkins	Young in All the Wrong Ways	Producer, guitars, Fiddle, Arrangements
Rhiannon Giddens	Tomorrow Is My Turn	Fiddle, Violin, Guitar, Arranger (Strings, Horns)
Phoebe Bridgers	Stranger in the Alps	Violin
Noam Pikelny	Noam Pikelny Plays Kenny Baker Plays Bill Monroe ^	Producer
Noam Pikelny	Beat The Devil and Carry a Rail^	Producer
Jerry Douglas	The Best Kept Secret ^	Fiddle, Strings
Chris Thile	How to Grow a Woman from the Ground ^	Fiddle, Vocals, Arranging
The Secret Sisters	Put Your Needle Down	Fiddle, Violin, Arranger (Strings)
Chris Hillman	The Other Side	Fiddle
Tom Brosseau	What I Mean to Say Is Goodbye	Fiddle

=== Film ===
º Academy Award Winner for Best Score

^ Academy Award Nominee Best Original Song

! Golden Globe Nominee Best Original Song

† Grammy Award Winner Best Original Song

Title	Composer	Role
The Peanut Butter Falcon	Gabe Witcher, Jonathan Sadoff, Noam Pikelny, Zach Dawes	Fiddle
The Ballad of Buster Scruggs	Additional Music	Fiddle
The Good Dinosaur	Mychael & Jeff Danna	Fiddle
The Hunger Games: Mockingjay – Part 2	Additional music	Composer
Toy Story^!	Randy Newman	Fiddle
Cars †	Randy Newman	Fiddle
Cars 3	Randy Newman	Fiddle
The Princess and the Frog	Randy Newman	Fiddle
Inside Llewyn Davis	T Bone Burnett	Fiddle, Vocals
The Hunger Games	James Newton Howard	Fiddle
Brokeback Mountainº	Gustavo Santaolalla	Fiddle
Babelº	Gustavo Santaolalla	Violin
Charlie Wilson's War	James Newton Howard	Fiddle
This Is 40	Jon Brion	Fiddle, Violin
Kingsman: The Golden Circle	Henry Jackman, Matthew Margeson	Fiddle
A Million Ways to Die in the West	Joel McNeely	Fiddle
Wild Hogs	Teddy Castellucci	Fiddle
The Homesman	Marco Beltrami	Violin
Robin Hood	Marc Streitenfeld	Fiddle
The SpongeBob SquarePants Movie	Andy Paley	Fiddle
Nights in Rodanthe	Jeanine Tesori	Fiddle
Soul Men	Stanley Clarke	Fiddle
The Dukes of Hazzard	Nathan Barr	Fiddle
Without a Paddle	Chris Beck	Fiddle
Welcome Home Roscoe Jenkins	David Newman	Fiddle
The Best Of Me	Aaron Zigman	Fiddle
Bridge to Terabithia	Aaron Zigman	Fiddle
Christmas Cottage	Aaron Zigman	Fiddle
Flicka	Aaron Zigman	Fiddle
The Wendell Baker Story	Aaron Zigman	Fiddle
The Notebook	Aaron Zigman	Fiddle
Mater and the Ghostlight	Bruno Coon	Fiddle
Bigger, Stronger, Faster*	Dave Porter	Fiddle
Venom	James L. Venable	Fiddle
The Cave	Reinhold Heil	Violin

=== Television ===
^ Emmy Nominated

Title	Selection	Role
True Detective Season 3	Score	Recordist, Additional Music, performer
True Detective Season 2	Score	Violin, Electric Violin, Electric Bass
True Detective	The Angry River	Composer, Arranger (strings), Violin
Nashville	Nothing in This World Will Ever Break My Heart Again^	Co-Producer (w/ T Bone Burnett), Arranger (Strings, Background vocals), Violin
Nashville	Ho Hey	Co-Producer (w/ T Bone Burnett), Guitar, Fiddle, Mandolin
Nashville	Used	Co-Producer (w/ T Bone Burnett), Arranger (Strings, Background vocals), Fiddle
Nashville	Consider Me	Co-Producer (w/ T Bone Burnett), Arranger (Strings, Background vocals), Fiddle
Nashville	We Are Water	Co-Producer (w/ T Bone Burnett), Arranger (Strings, Background vocals), Fiddle
Nashville	Looking for a Place To Shine	Co-Producer (w/ T Bone Burnett), Arranger (Strings, Background vocals), Fiddle, Mandolin, Keyboards
Nashville	Hanging on a Lie	Co-Producer (w/ T Bone Burnett), Arranger (Strings, Background vocals), Fiddle, Mandolin, Keyboards
Nashville	Stomping Ground	Co-Producer (w/ T Bone Burnett), Arranger (Strings, Background vocals), Fiddle,Mandolin,
Nashville	Gun for a Mouth	Fiddle
Nashville	Tough All Over	Fiddle
Nashville	Let There Be Lonely	Keyboards
Better Call Saul	Score	Violin
Sons of Anarchy	All Along The Watchtower	Fiddle
Legends of Tomorrow	Score	Fiddle
Justified	Score	Fiddle
Turn: Washington's Spies	Score	Fiddle
Party of Five	Score	Violin
King of the Hill	Score	Fiddle
Crossing Jordan	Innocent When You Dream	Fiddle
Heartland	Score	Fiddle
Point of Honor	Score	Fiddle
Texas Rising	Score	Fiddle
Bonnie & Clyde	Score	Fiddle
Hatfields & McCoys	Score	Fiddle
Sarah Silverman Show	Score	Fiddle
News Radio	Score	Fiddle
Just Shoot Me!	Score	Fiddle
Worst Week	Score	Fiddle
Curious George	Score	Fiddle
Berenstain Bears	Theme Song	Fiddle
Three Moons Over Milford	Score	Fiddle
Any Day Now	Score	Fiddle
George and Leo	Score	Fiddle
The Lazarus Man	Score	Fiddle
Dilbert	Score	Fiddle

=== Live Television ===
Artists	Show
Punch Brothers	Conan; The Tonight Show with Jay Leno; Austin City Limits; Jools Holland; CBS Saturday Morning; Late Show with David Letterman
Punch Brothers w/ Steve Martin	Late Show with David Letterman
Dolly Parton	78th Academy Awards Show
Beck and Willie Nelson	The Tonight Show with Jay Leno; Farm Aid
Willie Nelson and Lee Ann Womack	The Tonight Show with Jay Leno
Willie Nelson	Academy of Country Music Awards

== Bands/Tours ==
Dates	Artist	Role
(2006–2023)	Punch Brothers	Fiddle, Vocals, Drums
(2014)	Steve Martin and Martin Short	Fiddle
(2012)	Paul Simon	Fiddle
(2010)	Dave Rawlings Machine	Fiddle, Guitar, Vocals
(2006)	k.d. lang	Fiddle, Guitar
(2005)	Loggins and Messina Sittin' In Again Reunion Tour	Fiddle, Mandolin, Dobro, Percussion, Vocals
(2002–2008)	Jerry Douglas Band	Fiddle
(2000–2001)	Eve 6	Bass
(1999)	The Bluegrass Sessions f/ Béla Fleck, Sam Bush, Jerry Douglas, Bryan Sutton, Mark Schatz	Fiddle
(1995–2000)	Laurel Canyon Ramblers	Fiddle
(1984–2008)	The Witcher Brothers	Fiddle, Vocals
