= Punch (album) =

Studio album by Punch Brothers
- Released: February 26, 2008
- Recorded: 2007
- Genre: Progressive bluegrass
- Length: 56:37
- Label: Nonesuch
- Producer: Steven Epstein

Punch Brothers chronology
How to Grow a Woman from the Ground (2006)	Punch (2008)	Antifogmatic (2010)

Album artwork beneath outer sleeve

Professional ratings
Review scores
Source	Rating
AllMusic	4/5 stars
Burlington Free Press	(feature)
CanadaEast	(positive)
Chicago Tribune	(feature)
Daily Gazette	(feature)
Denver Westword	(mixed)
The Guardian	4/5 stars
Time Out New York	4/5 stars

Punch is the debut album by Punch Brothers. It was released by Nonesuch Records on February 26, 2008.

The centerpiece of the album is mandolinist Chris Thile's ambitious four movement suite, "The Blind Leaving the Blind". Thile says the piece was written in part to deal with his divorce of 2004. It was composed over the course of a year and a half using Finale composition software. About 30% of the composition involves some improvisation, "like a jazz lead sheet or a written out fiddle tune". Chris Thile has said that his goal was "to fuse the formal disciplines of jazz or classical composition with the vibrancy of bluegrass or folk music song writing". The remainder of the album was co-written by the entire band.

This album, like the group's previous effort How to Grow a Woman from the Ground, was recorded live, with only minimal use of multi-track.

== Track listing ==
No.	Title	Writer(s)	Length
1.	"Punch Bowl"	Punch Brothers	3:34
2.	"The Blind Leaving the Blind: First Movement"	Chris Thile	12:13
3.	"The Blind Leaving the Blind: Second Movement"	Thile	9:21
4.	"The Blind Leaving the Blind: Third Movement"	Thile	11:58
5.	"The Blind Leaving the Blind: Fourth Movement"	Thile	8:38
6.	"Sometimes"	Punch Brothers	4:45
7.	"Nothing, Then"	Punch Brothers	3:02
8.	"It’ll Happen"	Punch Brothers	3:06

Nonesuch online download Bonus Track
No.	Title	Writer(s)	Length
9.	"Bailey"	Punch Brothers	2:07

iTunes exclusive Bonus Track
No.	Title	Writer(s)	Length
9.	"I Know You Know"	Punch Brothers	3:32

== Personnel ==
- Producer: Steven Epstein
- Engineer: Richard King
- Assistant engineers: Hyomin Kang, Don Goodrick
- Mixing: Steven Epstein, Richard King
- Mastering: Steven Epstein, Richard King
- Cover photography: Autumn de Wilde
- Wardrobe: Shirley Kurata
- Studio photography: John Peets
- Design: Loren Witcher
- Executive producer: Robert Hurwitz
