= Late Night at Largo =

Live album by Tom Brosseau
- Released: 2004
- Recorded: Largo, Los Angeles, CA
- Genre: Indie rock, folk
- Label: Unabridged Music
- Producer: Mark Flanagan

Tom Brosseau chronology
North Dakota (2002)	Late Night at Largo (2004)	What I Mean To Say Is Goodbye (2005)

Late Night at Largo is a live album by Tom Brosseau. The album was produced by Mark Flanagan and engineered by Scott Fritz at Largo in Los Angeles, California.

== Album insight ==
There was no audience present during the recording of Late Night at Largo, as it was recorded after the nightclub's open hours. "How To Grow A Woman From The Ground", "Maryanne", "Lonesome Valley", and "Fragile Mind" were later included on Brosseau's FatCat Records debut, Empty Houses Are Lonely.

== Packaging ==
Stumptown Printers of Portland, Oregon created custom packaging for Late Night at Largo, which features a 6-panel recycled cardboard Compact Disc holder, liner notes printed on recycled paper, complete with a watermark, and soy-based ink. This album was released independently on Compact Disc only.

== Guitar ==
Tom Brosseau used a dreadnought acoustic guitar for the recording of Late Night at Largo, manufactured by the Santa Cruz Guitar Company in Santa Cruz, California. Engineer Scott Fritz mixed the album using both the guitar's Highlander iP-1 Pickup and Preamp system and a common room microphone. Details of this setup were photographed by Mark Flanagan and used as paneling shots for the Compact Disc packaging.

== Original Liner notes ==
12 songs recorded live at Largo, 432 N. Fairfax, Los Angeles, California. No audience, one microphone — the chairs were put on the tables, the waitresses and staff clocked out, the lights were turned down, a little traffic on the street, some people walking by on the sidewalk. The songs were performed to an empty room.

== Track listing ==
1. "Still Building"
2. "Maryanne"
3. "Kick Matilda Out of Bed"
4. "Rose"
5. "Lonesome Valley"
6. "How to Grow a Woman from the Ground"
7. "Portrait of George Washington"
8. "Broken Ukulele"
9. "Reallife Video Game (Do What You Want)"
10. "Fragile Mind"
11. "Young and Free"
12. "Don’t Get Around Much Anymore" (Composed by Duke Ellington and Bob Russell, arranged and adapted by Tom Brosseau)

== Personnel ==
- Tom Brosseau: Vocals, harmonica, acoustic guitar
