= Grass Punks =

Studio album by Tom Brosseau
- Released: 2014
- Studio: Hollywood, California
- Label: Crossbill Records
- Producer: Sean Watkins

Tom Brosseau chronology
John & Tom (2011)	Grass Punks (2014)	Perfect Abandon (2015)

Professional ratings
Review scores
Source	Rating
Chicago Tribune	3.5/4 stars

Grass Punks is an album by Tom Brosseau. It was released in 2014 on Crossbill Records. It is the first album in his North Dakota Trilogy. It was produced and recorded by Sean Watkins in Hollywood, California.

== Production ==
The album was recorded in two days, using a single microphone.

== Marilyn Hagerty ==
In "Stuck on the Roof Again" the narrator finds himself in the unfortunate situation of getting stranded on the roof after a gust of wind blows his ladder down while he's clearing away snow from the eaves and shingles. Legend has it this very incident happened to American journalist Marilyn Hagerty, friend of Tom Brosseau and also Grand Forks, North Dakota resident, who eventually was able to flag down a passer-by for help. Brosseau told the story of the song while appearing on the NPR Music program, Tiny Desk Concerts, with Bob Boilen and Robin Hilton.

== Critical reception ==
The Los Angeles Times wrote that the songs "speak openly about loneliness, reminisce about moments of love and heartbreak and approach memories with poetic but unsentimental flourishes." The Boston Globe wrote that the album "essentially consists of scaffolding for material to come later ... Simplicity can be a virtue, but it’s not enough on its own." PopMatters called Grass Punks "a welcome return from one of the most dynamic voices in modern folk."

== Track listing ==
1. "Cradle Your Device"
2. "Stuck on the Roof Again"
3. "Tami"
4. "Today Is a Bright New Day"
5. "Love High John The Conqueror Root"
6. "Green Shampoo"
7. "Gregory Page of San Diego"
8. "I Love to Play Guitar"
9. "We Were Meant To Be Together"

== Personnel ==
- Tom Brosseau – acoustic guitar, vocals
- Sean Watkins – acoustic, tenor, and electric guitar; bass, backing vocals, mandolin, synth pad
- John Rausch – mastering and mixing
