= What I Mean to Say Is Goodbye =

What I Mean To Say Is Goodbye

Studio album by Tom Brosseau
- Released: June 7, 2005
- Genre: Indie rock, folk
- Label: Tom Brosseau
- Producer: Sam Jones

Tom Brosseau chronology
Late Night at Largo (2004)	What I Mean To Say Is Goodbye (2005)	Empty Houses Are Lonely (2006)

Professional ratings
Review scores
Source	Rating
Allmusic	4/5 stars

What I Mean To Say Is Goodbye is a 2005 album by Tom Brosseau and features a cast of notable Los Angeles, California musicians. It was produced by Sam Jones (I Am Trying to Break Your Heart: A Film About Wilco, Off Camera with Sam Jones, Lost Songs: The Basement Tapes Continued).

== Album insight ==
When the album was released, "West of Town" received much attention from KEXP host John Richards, which eventually led to Brosseau's appearance on The Mid Day Show with Cheryl Waters.

The composition, "Grafton", which appears on this album, was originally on North Dakota under the slightly different title, "Grafton, ND".

The photo of the black cat wrapped around Brosseau's shoulders was taken on a whim by Sam Jones and not intended to be part of the album, but later it became the front cover. Since the cat was present throughout the entire recording of What I Mean To Say Is Goodbye including him on the front cover seemed a very fitting idea. In an excerpt from the album's liner notes, Brosseau explains: "The cat would come in the studio and keep me company. He would pussyfoot around the cables and cords, maybe sidle up against my leg and then fall down on my feet. I'd say, 'Jackie, go on.' Jackie would look up at me and his purr would get a little louder, but he would not leave."

The title of the album was taken from a song of the same name, "What I Mean To Say Is Goodbye", which was later cut during the sequencing process and remains unreleased.

Design and layout for What I Mean To Say Is Goodbye was created by Grammy-award-winning designer, Peter Buchanan-Smith, and features original artwork, liner notes, and a short story by Tom Brosseau.

== Original liner notes ==
12 songs about wandering around, loss of love, being followed by memories (or ghosts), empty buildings, the flood of 1997, escaping to a town 15 miles away but feeling like it’s another world, trains, and a gal I once knew in North Dakota.

== Track listing ==
1. "West of Town"
2. "Jane and Lou"
3. "Tonight I'm Careful With You"
4. "Wandering"
5. "Too Much Wear And Tear To Care"
6. "Grafton"
7. "Unfamiliar Places"
8. "St. Joe St."
9. "In My Time Of Dying" (Traditional)
10. "My Little Babe"
11. "Quiet Drink"

== Personnel ==
- Tom Brosseau: Vocals, harmonica, acoustic and electric guitar
- Angela Correa: Duet on tracks 4 and 10
- Benmont Tench: Piano on tracks 3, 5, 8 and 11; harmonium on track 11
- Ian Walker: Upright bass on tracks 3, 4, 5 and 7
- Sara Watkins: Violin on tracks 3, 5 and 7
- Gabe Witcher: Violin on tracks 3, 5 and 7
- Daphne Chen: Violin on tracks 4 and 9
- Jon Brion: Electric guitar on track 9
- Pete Thomas: Drums on track 5
- Sam Jones: Organ on tracks 1 and 7; high-string guitar on track 5; wurlitzer on track 6; celeste on track 9
- Ron McMaster: mastering
