= Collings Guitars =

US stringed instrument manufacturer

- Type: Private
- Industry: Musical instruments
- Founded: 1973; 53 years ago
- Founder: Bill Collings
- Headquarters: Austin, Texas, United States
- Products: Acoustic, electric, archtop guitars; Mandolins; Ukuleles
- Website: collingsguitars.com

Collings Guitars is an Austin, Texas–based stringed instrument manufacturer. The company was founded in 1973 by Bill Collings (August 9, 1948 – July 14, 2017). In addition to acoustic guitars, Collings Guitars manufactures electric guitars, archtop guitars, mandolins and ukuleles.

== History ==
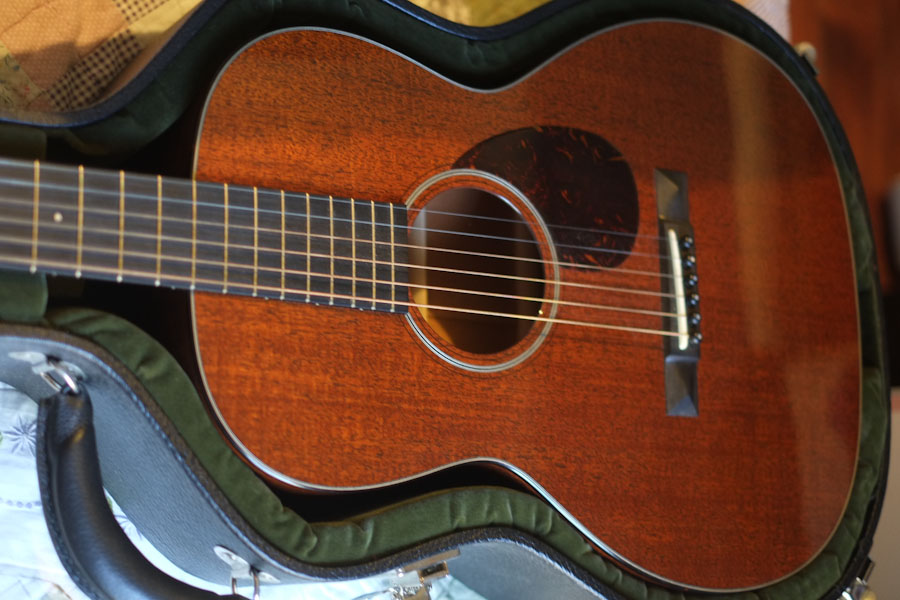
001M guitar

Collings attended Ohio University as a pre-med student in the early 1970s. Shortly after, Collings quit his studies in order to work in machining, which he continued for five years. Around this time, he built his first guitar. In 1975 he moved to Houston, Texas, where he began work for an oil field company, as an engineer, and began trying to improve his guitar designs. Three years later he met musician Lyle Lovett (then a college student), who interviewed the fellow guitar-builder for the school newspaper, Collings told Texas Monthly. Lovett, who was impressed by the guitar's style, purchased a guitar from Collings.

In the early 1980s, Collings tried to move his shop to San Diego, California but was unable to, and had to reside in Austin, Texas. He began work, sharing a space with fellow luthiers; Tom Ellis (mandolin builder) and Mike Stevens. After a few years, Collings became more "serious" about his craft and purchased a garage.

George Gruhn, a vintage-guitar collector/seller in Nashville, hired Collings to make 25 guitars in 1987. Collings soon received recognition from competing guitar stores, as well as various interviews in magazines about his products. Two years later, he hired his first employee and consequently, the company began to grow.

At the 2006, Summer NAMM Show, the company grew to include the manufacturing of electric-guitars, producing the following three models; the I-35, the CL (City Limits), and the 290. In addition to the manufacture of acoustic/electric-guitars, the company begun production of mandolins and ukuleles. As of May 2012, the company had roughly 85 employees and manufactured 6-7 acoustic guitar models, 3 electric, 2 mandolin and 2 ukuleles, per day.

== Models ==
=== 14-fret acoustic guitars ===
- D Series: The square-shouldered 14-fret dreadnought is the most popular steel-string acoustic guitar body shape in the world. Collings D Series guitars are often employed by bluegrass flat pickers who must compete with inherently louder instruments such as banjos and fiddles.
- OM Series: The 'OM' (Orchestra Model) is a 14-fret model that is popular with fingerstyle guitar soloists who choose to play on steel strings. The OM is also used in flatpicking.
- 00 Series: With a short scale the 14-fret 00 series is a smaller alternative to the OM.
- 0 Series: With the exception of the Baby, the 0 is Collings' smallest guitar and is offered with the same shorter scale found on the 12-fret 00.
- Baby Series: Collings' smallest guitar, approximately a 3/4 size version of their OM. 12 1/2-inches wide in the lower bout with a 24 1/8-inch scale.
- CJ Series: The Collings Jumbo is their version of the classic slope-shouldered dreadnought.
- SJ Series: The SJ is Collings' version of what is commonly called a small Jumbo. Although the 16-inch lower bout is slightly wider than a dreadnought, and the sides almost as deep, the tight curve at the waist creates in a very different sound chamber. SJs, especially examples in maple, typically have a more pronounced midrange response when compared to a dreadnought.
- C10 Series: Based on parlor guitars first introduced around the same time as the OM, the Collings C10 is a leaner alternative, with the narrow waist and small upper bout.

=== 12-fret acoustic guitars ===
- DS Series: The original 12-fret dreadnought shape.
- 00 Series: Collings offers the 00 in its original, 12-fret configuration. This guitar shape was first designed around the time of the Civil War. Its dimensions are similar to a typical classical guitar, with a slotted headstock and small pyramid bridge.
- 000 Series: The 12-fret 000 has the same general appearance as the Collings 00, but in a larger size with longer string scale. Although it's the same width and depth as the OM, the longer body typically produces more bass and overall volume.

=== Mandolins ===
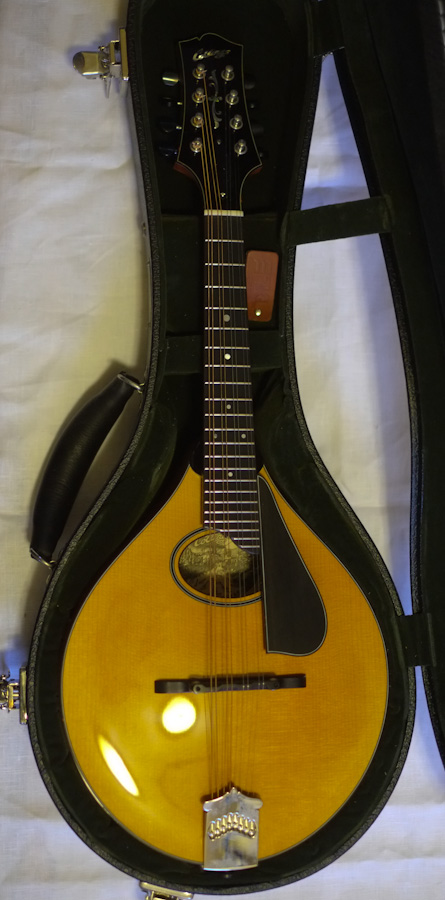
MT2-O mandolin

Collings began producing mandolins in 1999 and offers A-style and F-style mandolins as well as mandolas. In addition to making the A and F body shapes, Collings also makes f-hole and oval hole mandolins. Collings mandolins are one of the most highly regarded brands of quality, US built, mandolins and mandolas.

=== Electric guitars ===
- 290: Named after the highway where the Collings factory is located. Features two hands wound P90 pickups from Jason Lollar.
- 360: Similar in shape to a Gibson Les Paul, the 360 is slightly thinner and lighter.
- CL and CL Deluxe: the City Limits is constructed from seasoned maple and Honduran mahogany. It is lightweight, contoured, and features a hand-set mortise and tenon neck joint.
- Collings I-35: Named for Austin's infamous traffic artery, the I-35 is aesthetically reminiscent of a Gibson ES-335. The body is pared down slightly at 15" wide, and it has a slightly more angular shape that comparatively reduces its size and weight.
- SoCo Deluxe: Named after Austin's South Congress Avenue, the SoCo Deluxe brings in elements from both the I-35 and CL models to create a hybrid.

=== Archtop guitars ===
- Standard: Collings Archtops come with a lower bout width of 16-inch, 17-inch, and 18-inch. Based on the earliest American f-hole archtops of the 1920s, the 16-inch archtops are a rarity among modern archtop models in that they are designed to be played as acoustic guitars.
- CL Jazz: Built with a fully hollow one-piece Honduran mahogany body, carved European spruce top, and modern stylings.

=== Ukuleles ===
Collings began producing ukuleles in 2010 and offers a variety of models in both concert and tenor sizes. Collings ukuleles are made in 3 main "trim" levels UC1, UC2, UC3, and UT1, UT2, and UT3. UC= Ukulele Concert, UT=Ukulele Tenor and the trim level is higher as the number goes higher. Collings either ceased or slowed ukulele production around 2014, reportedly shifting resources to produce the new line of Waterloo guitars. Collings has maintained that they will resurrect ukulele production at some point and is still doing some custom orders. Collings ukuleles are highly regarded for their light build quality and tone.

== Notable users ==
- Marcus Mumford
- Ryan Adams
- Lyle Lovett
- Jerry Jeff Walker
- Julian Lage
- Brandi Carlile
- Robert Earl Keen
- Phoebe Bridgers
- Tyler Childers
- Matt Nathanson
- Charlie Sexton
- Arlen Roth
- Adrianne Lenker
- Prince
