= Tom Brosseau =

American singer-songwriter

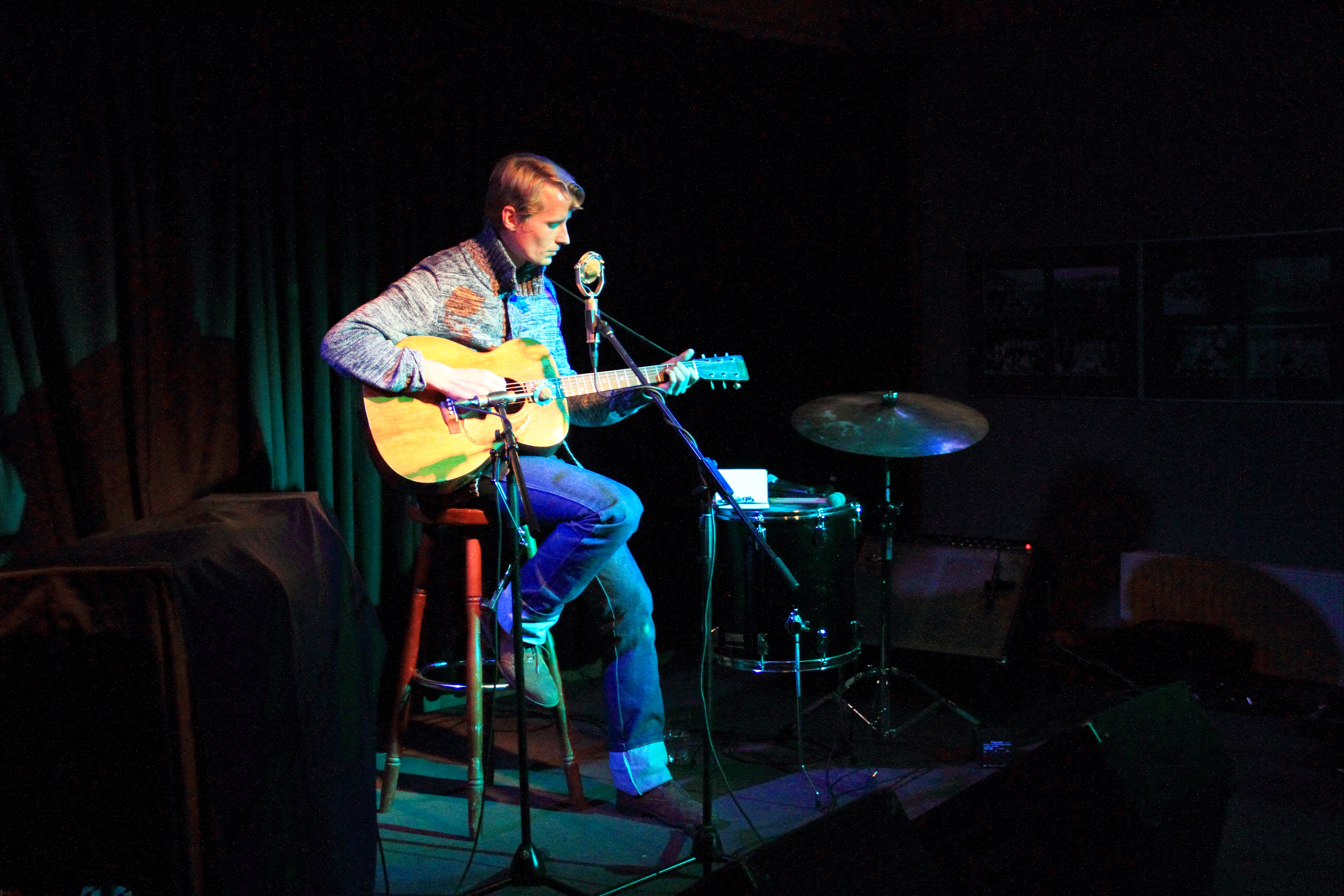
- Brosseau at a house concert in Salt Lake City, Utah (2024)

Background information
- Born: Thomas Anderson Brosseau
- Origin: Grand Forks, North Dakota, United States
- Genres: Folk
- Occupations: Writer, performer, radio podcast host and creator
- Instruments: Guitar, vocals, harmonica
- Years active: 2001–present
- Label: Tom Brosseau
- Website: www.tombrosseau.com

Thomas Anderson Brosseau is an American singer-songwriter and guitarist from Grand Forks, North Dakota, United States.

== Early life ==
Brosseau was born in Marshfield, Wisconsin on November 3, 1976. His family moved back to their native North Dakota in 1978, where his father, James, was a doctor at United in Grand Forks until he retired after 40 years, in 2018. His mother, Jolene Rae, graduated from art school in St. Paul and was an interior designer. He has two siblings, Benjamin and Caroline.

Brosseau learned to play acoustic guitar from his grandmother. He said:

I grew up with music in the church, in the school, music at home. I learned a lot of hymnal and folk songs, both traditional and contemporary, and since I was influenced by what my grandparents listened to, in a sense I studied the singers and songwriters of the Great American Songbook".

== Career ==
Brosseau moved to Los Angeles in 2003, and began performing at the renowned club Largo, where he met siblings Sara and Sean Watkins of the band Nickel Creek.

Brosseau has toured in Japan, Canada, Portugal, Iceland, and Australia. He also sings and plays guitar with Becky Stark, Sebastian Steinberg, and John C. Reilly in John Reilly & Friends. In 2011, they released the Jack White-produced Blue Series 7" singles John & Tom (TMR-112) and Becky & John (TMR-113) on Third Man Records.

Brosseau's song "How to Grow a Woman from the Ground" was covered by Chris Thile, who released a 2006 album of the same name. Experimental folk pop duo Christy & Emily covered "Here Comes The Water Now" in 2010, a song originally featured on Grand Forks, and also in 2010 the band Mice Parade covered his song "Mary Anne" on their album What It Means To Be Left Handed.

In 2014, Robin Hilton of NPR said Brosseau "possesses one of the most arresting voices in folk music today."

=== Collaborations ===
Brosseau's musical collaborations include a folk duo with singer-songwriter Gregory Page called The American Folksingers, which began in San Diego, California in 2002. The American Folksingers released two volumes of American folk music on Page's Bed Pan Records for which Lou Curtiss was musical advisor.

Les Shelleys, Brosseau's folk duo with California singer-songwriter Angela Correa, also began in San Diego, California in the early 2000s. They released one album on FatCat Records in 2010, Les Shelleys, and toured extensively in the U.S., U.K., and Europe.

Brosseau has appeared on the Watkins Family Hour, headed by Sean and Sara Watkins, in Los Angeles, California, and John Reilly & Friends, headed by actor John C. Reilly, featuring Becky Stark and Sebastian Steinberg.

== The North Dakota Trilogy ==
Brosseau's three Crossbill Records releases North Dakota Impressions (2016), Perfect Abandon (2015), and Grass Punks (2014) are a trilogy, informally known as the North Dakota Trilogy. Brosseau said:

The trilogy visits life from a local perspective, taking the listener on a journey that doesn't clip along uniformly on some common interstate, but treads at its own pace on a rural route. More glances, more investigations and introspections, more light, more dark. Memories, imaginings, longings for a place, a home. My sense of home is probably the dearest thing I hold. I work to preserve it. I go back into my memories and dreams of where I grew up and I explore, not as a detective but a cartographer. Noting each item and each room I am able to keep everything alive, and when everything is alive it is glorious. So daily I roam through any place or structure I've ever been. I visit with people that have long since been dead. I sit in a park with my favorite weather.

== The Great American Folk Show ==
Before the COVID-19 pandemic, Brosseau had been developing a weekly radio program with Prairie Public in Fargo, North Dakota as both lead writer and host that focused on the arts, called The Great American Folk Show. The pilot was pitched in December 2019, and the show premiered on-air on May 3, 2020 with actor John C. Reilly, North Dakota food columnist Marilyn Hagerty, artist Penni Emrich Burkum, and musicians Tom Lennon and Heidi Gluck. Since then, The Great American Folk Show has featured over 600 artists, storytellers, musicians, authors, chefs, diner owners, curlers, painters, opera house caretakers and poets.

== Discography ==
- Tom Brosseau (2001)
- North Dakota (2002)
- Late Night at Largo (2004)
- What I Mean To Say Is Goodbye (2005)
- Empty Houses Are Lonely (2006)
- Grand Forks (2007)
- Cavalier (2007)
- Posthumous Success] (2009)
- Les Shelleys (2010)
- John & Tom (2011)
- Grass Punks (2014)
- Perfect Abandon (2015)
- North Dakota Impressions (2016)
- Treasures Untold (2017)
- In The Shadow Of The Hill: Songs from the Carter Family catalogue, Vol. 1 (2019)
- A Lifetime Ago, Vol. One (2020)
- Live in York (2020)
- The Prairie (2020)
- A Lifetime Ago, Vol. Two (2021)
- A Lifetime Ago, Vol. Three (2022)
- From Blue & White Notebooks (2022)
- A Lifetime Ago, Vol. Three (2023)
- Songs from The Great American Folk Show, Vol. I (2023)
- Alluvium and other North Dakota folk songs (2024)

== Singles and EPs ==
- Hurt to Try EP (2004)
- Amory EP (2006)
- Been True EP (2009)
- "Sunflower" with Heidi Gluck (2022)
- "Under African Skies" with Heidi Gluck (2022)
- "A Bird Is Following Me" with Chel White (2023)
