= Martin D-28 =

Steel-string acoustic guitar

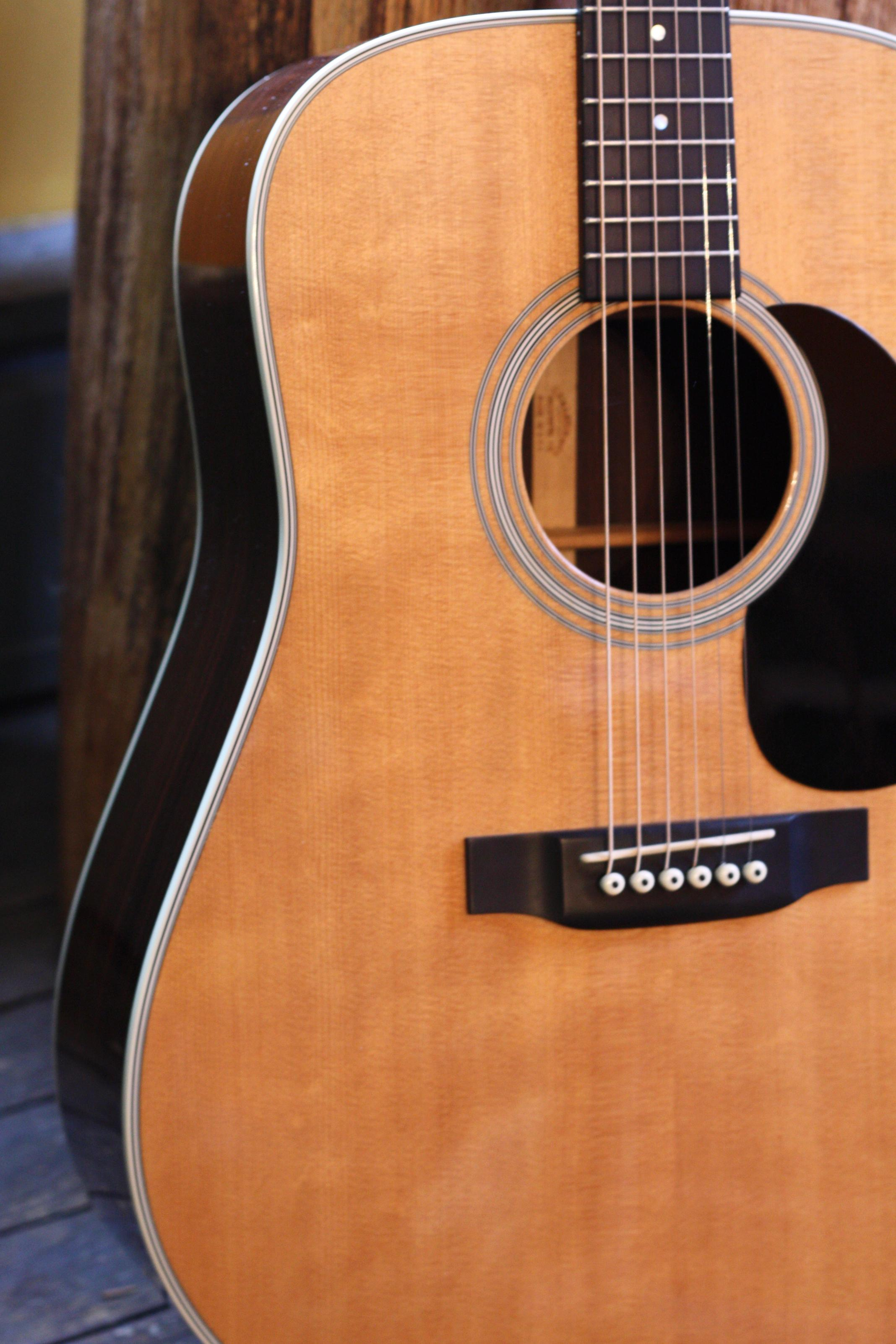
- Manufacturer: C. F. Martin & Company
- Period: 1931–present

Construction
- Body type: Square-shoulder dreadnought
- Neck joint: Dovetail

Woods
- Body: Sitka Spruce or Adirondack red spruce top Rosewood back and sides
- Neck: Mahogany
- Fretboard: Ebony

Hardware
- Bridge: Ebony

Colors available
- Natural, Sunburst, Amber

The Martin D-28 is a dreadnought-style acoustic guitar made by C. F. Martin & Company of Nazareth, Pennsylvania.

== History ==
The Martin D-28 uses a dreadnought design, a naval term adopted and used by many to describe its larger body dimensions, hence the "D" designation. When first created, the dreadnought guitar was seen as less favorable to the standard, smaller-sized guitars of its time. Sales finally started to take off in 1935, "when they were given a single illustration on page 12 in the company's catalog, opposite a Hawaiian model." The ad read:

"This is the famous 'Dread-naught' bass guitar, originated by Martin in 1917 and now modernized for the plectrum style of playing. The extra wide and very deep body produces a tone of great power and smoothness, especially fine for broadcasting or recording. Rosewood body, spruce top, choroid edges, re-enforced mahogany neck, ebony fingerboard and bridge, wide frets, polished lacquer finish. Dark top on special order at no extra charge."

Introduced by Martin in 1931, the D-28 is prized for its booming projection and high quality tone. The first batch went wholly to the Chicago Musical Instrument Company, although this "exclusive" deal didn't last for long. Originally built around the Martin D-14 Fret platform, early examples included exotic tone woods, such as Brazilian Rosewood, which is no longer available in large quantities due to deforestation and subsequent treaty controls. Original D-28 guitars also used standard materials no longer found in current production models. For example, they had a distinct "herringbone" pattern that lined the top of the guitar. However, this touch was discontinued in 1946, as the German-made materials were no longer available post-World War II. Also the "diamonds and squares" fret board inlays were reduced to plain dot styling around this time.

D-28s were so popular at one point during the 1950s, that customers were waiting two years or more for one.

== Current models ==
Starting with the 2017 D-28's Martin has switched to forward shifted X-bracing, a revised neck pattern termed High Performance Taper with Modified Low Oval profile with 1-3/4” ebony fret board width at the bone nut, 2-1/8” at the 12th fret. The previous black guard is now faux tortoise shell and the former enclosed tuning machines are now open gear. Aging toner is applied to the Sitka Spruce tops before application of the nitrocellulose lacquer finish.

The modern D-28 standard series is made of several high quality tone woods, including solid Sitka Spruce tops, Indian rosewood back and sides, mahogany neck, ebony fret board, ebony bridge, and maple bridge plate. It uses the classic non scalloped X bracing pattern prior to 2017 pioneered by Martin, along with an ebony bridge and fret board. Much of the construction is still done by hand although in recent years Martin has adopted computer controlled CNC machines to fashion the guitar's neck, and employs automated buffing and polishing machines, while maintaining the overall quality of the finished product. As of 2020, a base model has a list price of $3,599 U.S. Martin dealers usually offer discounts off the list prices. Older models made in the 1940s, 1950s and pre-1969 D-28s can command far greater prices.

== Variations ==
The D-28 has been made in several variations over the years, including:

- HD-28: Has scalloped braces, said to give the guitar a more "open" sound than a D-28. Also features the herringbone (or "pre-war") top border and a zigzag, or "zipper" backstrip.
- HD-28V: This variation resembles the original pre-war model and features both chrome butter-bean tuners and herringbone bindings around the aged-toned top. The X of its scalloped bracing pattern is shifted forward (toward the sound hole) by approximately one inch, making the lower bout top vibrate more freely/responsive, and resulting in a very potent and bass-rich guitar.
- D28E: A very limited run version of the D-28 with special pickups placed at the end of the fretboard and near the bridge. While not generally well received, it is considered a collector's item.
- D12-28: A 12-string version, otherwise the same as its brother the D-28.

Notable users have included Johnny Cash, Eric Clapton, Chris Cornell, Nick Drake, Slim Dusty, Bob Dylan, Ramblin' Jack Elliott, Lester Flatt, John Frusciante, Noel Gallagher, Jerry Garcia, Dick Gaughan, Michael Hedges, Scott Hutchison, Ben Howard, Kansas, Kingston Trio, John Lennon, Kevin Kastning, Chris Martin, John Martyn, Paul McCartney, Marcus Mumford, Harry Nilsson, Jimmy Page, Brad Paisley, Nancy Wilson, Lindsey Buckingham, Tom Paxton, Elvis Presley, John Prine, Tony Rice, Judee Sill, The Supernaturals, Van Morrison, Joni Mitchell, Sturgill Simpson, Hank Snow, Stephen Stills, Charles Thompson IV, Clarence White, Hank Williams, Steve Winwood, Peter Yarrow, David Crosby and Neil Young.

== Guitar specs ==
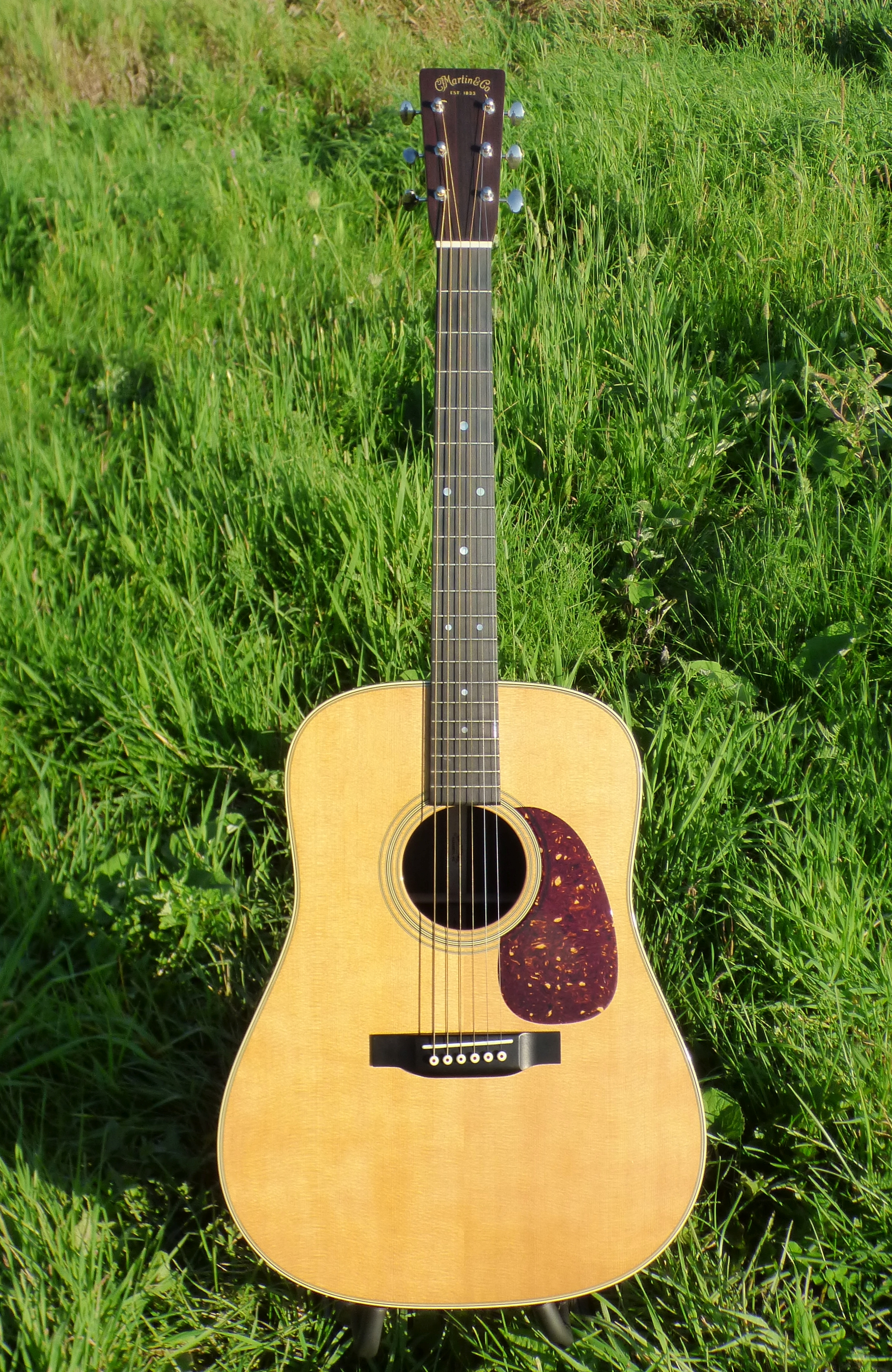
Martin D-28 Acoustic Guitar

- Model: D-28
- Construction: Mahogany Blocks/Dovetail Neck Joint
- Body Size: D-14 Fret
- Top: Solid Sitka Spruce or Adirondack red spruce
- Rosette: Style 28
- Top Bracing Pattern: Standard X
- Top Braces: Solid Sitka Spruce 5/16"
- Back Material: Solid East Indian Rosewood
- Back Purfling: Style 28
- Side Material: Solid East Indian Rosewood
- Endpiece: White Boltaron
- Endpiece Inlay: Black/White Boltaron
- Binding: White Boltaron
- Top Inlay Style: Multiple Black/White Boltaron
- Side Inlay: none
- Back Inlay: Black/White Boltaron
- Neck Material: Select Hardwood
- Neck Shape: Low Profile
- Nut Material: Bone
- Headstock: Solid/Diamond/Square Taper
- Headplate: Solid East Indian Rosewood /Raised Gold Foil
- Heelcap: White Boltaron
- Fingerboard Material: Solid Black Ebony
- Scale Length: 25.4"
- Number Of Frets Clear: 14
- Number Of Frets Total: 20
- Fingerboard Width At Nut: 1-11/16"
- Fingerboard Width At 12th Fret: 2-1/8"
- Fingerboard Position Inlays: Style 28
- Fingerboard Binding: none
- Finish Back & Sides: Polished Gloss
- Finish Top: Polished Gloss
- Finish Neck: Satin
- Bridge Material: Solid Black Ebony
- Bridge Style: Belly
- Bridge String Spacing: 2-1/8"
- Saddle: 16" Radius/Compensated/Bone
- Tuning Machines: Chrome Enclosed w/ Large Buttons
- Recommended Strings: Martin SP Lifespan Phosphor Bronze Medium Gauge (MSP7200)
- Bridge & End Pins: White w/ Black Dots
- Pickguard: Black
