= Cavalier (album) =

Studio album by Tom Brosseau
- Released: 2007
- Genre: Indie rock, folk
- Label: Tom Brosseau
- Producer: John Parish

Tom Brosseau chronology
Grand Forks (2006)	Cavalier (2007)	Posthumous Success (2009)

Professional ratings
Review scores
Source	Rating
Allmusic	4/5 stars

Cavalier is an album by Tom Brosseau, released in 2007. It was produced by John Parish (PJ Harvey, Giant Sand) and engineered by Ali Chant at Toy Box Studios in Bristol, U.K.

== Album insight ==
Artwork from Cavalier was created by DLT and meant to emulate Black Sparrow Press, whose vibrant title page and cover design colors and shapes were created by Barbara Martin.

The photo used for the album was taken in Portland, Oregon by American photographer, Lars Topelmann.

== Track listing ==
1. "Amory"
2. "Brass Ring Blues"
3. "Committed to Memory"
4. "Brand New Safe"
5. "My Heart Belongs To The Sea"
6. "My Peggy Dear"
7. "Instructions To Meet The Devil"
8. "I Want To Make This Moment Last"
9. "I'm Travelling The River On The Dakota Queen"
10. "Kiss My Lips"

== Personnel ==
- Tom Brosseau: Vocals, acoustic guitar
- John Parish: Drums, trombone, loops, piano
- Jeremy Hogg: Electric guitar
