= Grand Forks (album) =

Studio album by Tom Brosseau
- Released: 2007
- Recorded: La Mesa, California
- Genre: Indie rock, folk
- Label: Tom Brosseau
- Producer: Gregory Page and John Doe

Tom Brosseau chronology
Tom Brosseau (2006)	Grand Forks (2007)	Cavalier (2007)

Professional ratings
Review scores
Source	Rating
Allmusic	3.5/5 stars

Grand Forks is a 2007 concept album by Tom Brosseau. It is about the devastating Red River Flood of 1997 that struck Brosseau's hometown of Grand Forks, North Dakota. Produced and recorded by Gregory Page, co-produced by John Doe. Liner notes penned by Pat Owens & Ed Schafer. In 2007, Brosseau was presented the Key to the City of Grand Forks, North Dakota by mayor Michael R. Brown.

== Track listing ==
1. "I Fly Wherever I Go"
2. "Fork in the Road" (featuring John Doe and Hilary Hahn)
3. "There’s More Than One Way to Dance"
4. "Blue Part of the Windshield" (featuring Hilary Hahn)
5. "Down on Skidrow"
6. "Here Comes the Water Now"
7. "Plaid Lined Jacket"
8. "Dark and Shiny Gun"
9. "97 Flood"

== Personnel ==
- Tom Brosseau: Vocals, acoustic guitar
- Gregory Page: Pump organ, additional guitars, backing vocals
- John Doe: backing vocals on track 2
- Hillary Hahn: Violin on tracks 2 and 4
- Doug Meyer: Slide guitar on tracks 1, 3, and 6
- Rob Thorsen: Upright bass on tracks 1, 3, 5, 6, and 7
