= Empty Houses Are Lonely =

Empty Houses are Lonely

Compilation album by Tom Brosseau
- Released: April 18, 2006
- Recorded: 2001–2003
- Genre: Folk
- Length: 42:38
- Label: Tom Brosseau
- Producer: Gregory Page (tracks 2, 3, 5-7, 10); Scott Fritz and Mark Flanagan (tracks 1, 4, 8, 9)

Tom Brosseau chronology
What I Mean To Say Is Goodbye (2005)	Empty Houses are Lonely (2006)	Tom Brosseau (2006)

Professional ratings
Review scores
Source	Rating
Allmusic	3.5/5 stars

Empty Houses are Lonely is a 2006 compilation album by Tom Brosseau.

== Album insight ==
Empty Houses are Lonely is composed of songs recorded from 2001 to 2003, including songs from North Dakota, an unreleased five song album called Five Song Demo, which received much attention on KCRW and lead to Brosseau's performance on Morning Becomes Eclectic with Nic Harcourt in 2003, and Late Night at Largo, as well as previously unreleased songs.

The album artwork is a collaboration between Brosseau, who provided the original tilting design, and graphics designer, DLT. A photo used in the liner notes was taken backstage at the Iron Horse Music Hall in Northampton, Massachusetts by American photographer Victoria Uhl in 2004.

Blurb from Fat Cat Records: "It was on Doug Schulkind's WFMU radio show Give The Drummer Some that we first came to hear the gentle acoustic sound of Tom Brosseau's music. A natural songwriting talent coming from such disparate influences as Nick Drake, Cole Porter, and Woody Guthrie, Tom sings songs of lost love and poetic observation that shimmer like aural tintypes. Ostensibly a collection of highlights from his recorded history to date, augmented by several new recordings, Empty Houses Are Lonely works as a fine introduction to Tom's plaintive, eloquent, timeless music."

== Track listing ==
1. "Fragile Mind"
2. "Empty Houses are Lonely"
3. "Hurt to Try"
4. "Mary Anne"
5. "Dark Garage"
6. "Heart of Mine"
7. "The Broken Ukulele"
8. "How to Grow a Woman from the Ground"
9. "Lonesome Valley"
10. "Bars"

== Original liner notes ==
Heartfelt songs, including an ode to Leonard Cohen, trying to get something that something else won't give, a local swimming hole in Lakota, a ukulele, the aftermath of a natural disaster, and walking along under a hot blue sky .

== Personnel ==
- Tom Brosseau: Vocal, acoustic and electric guitar, harmonica
- Gregory Page: Bass, additional guitars on track 3; Drums and bass on track 5; Pump organ on track 6
- Brian Cantrell: Drums on track 3
- Cindy Wasserman: Vocals on tracks 3 and 7
- Wes Tudor: Cello on track 6
