= Santa Cruz Guitar Company =

American musical instrument manufacturer

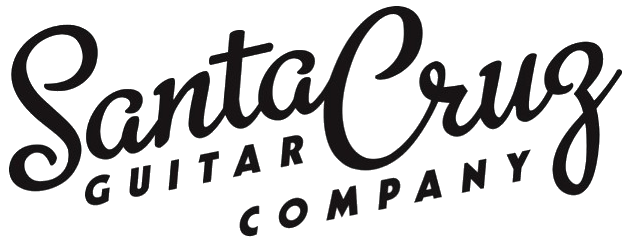
- Company type: Private
- Industry: Musical instrument
- Founded: 1976; 50 years ago
- Founder: Richard A. Hoover
- Headquarters: Santa Cruz, California, U.S.
- Products: Acoustic, acoustic bass & baritone guitars Mandocello; Ukuleles
- Number of employees: 22
- Website: santacruzguitar.com

The Santa Cruz Guitar Company is an American manufacturer of acoustic guitars, located in Santa Cruz, California. The company was started in 1976 by luthier Richard A. Hoover, who is reputed to have "trained some of the most accomplished contemporary luthiers in his workshop", and investors Bruce Ross and William Davis. They produce somewhere between 500 and 700 guitars a year, and their instruments are known for being "some of the world’s finest steel-string guitars" with characteristics described as "being highly resonate and having a complexity of overtones".

== History ==
Luthier Richard Hoover began learning his craft from Bruce McGuire and Jim Patterson in the late 1960s, and became well known in his home town of Santa Cruz, California after having run his own guitar repair and manufacturing shop for several years. In the early 1970s there was little information on building steel-string guitars available, and builders like Hoover, Bob Taylor, Jean Larrivée, and Michael Gurian started collaborating, sharing ideas, tools, and techniques as they discovered them. Hoover also learned from reading an "armload of books on how to make violins", supplied by his mother, who was a reference librarian, and learned techniques on wood finishes from a Swedish finish carpenter.

In 1976 Hoover was approached by investors Bruce Ross and William Davis, who wanted to start their own acoustic guitar company. Hoover had made his own guitar and he was invited to join the team. The name "Santa Cruz Guitar Company" was initially a place-holder name that they expected to replace when they thought of a better one, which never happened. The company called its first model the "D", a dreadnought that they wanted to have a tone with good balance between bass and treble. They chose koa wood for the sides and back, a wood common in guitars at the beginning of the twentieth century, but that had become rare during the Great Depression.

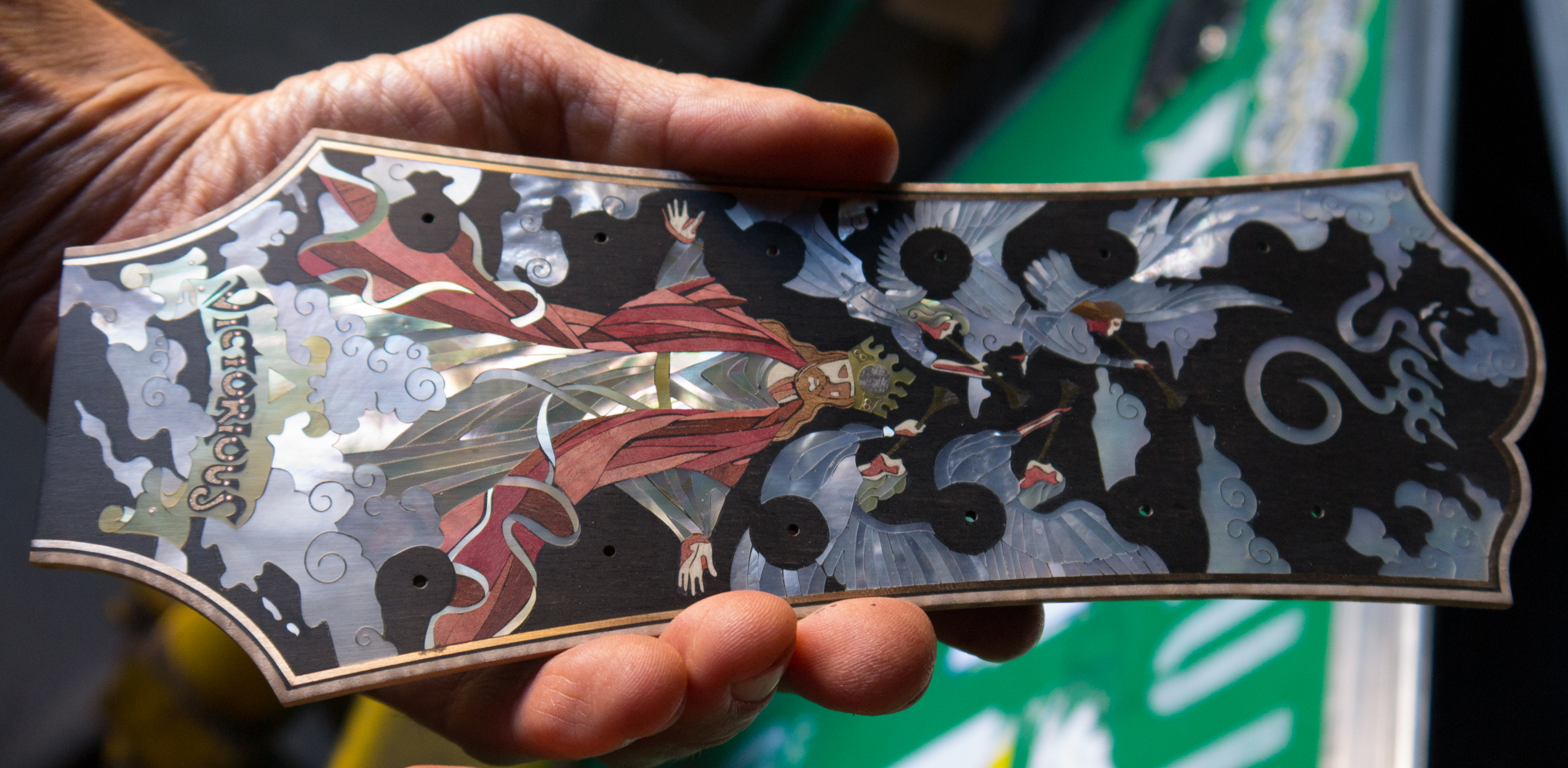
Headstock for a 12-string guitar with detailed pearl inlays at an intermediate stage of manufacturing

Many things happened with the company in 1978. William Davis left because the company was struggling to make a healthy profit, and Hoover purchased Davis's share. They introduced the H model, named after the initial of Paul Hostetter's last name, as he introduced the guitar's concepts to Hoover and Ross. The FTC model was also introduced, which has a flat top with a carved, arched back. This model was a limited edition run, with the 17th of the series being bought by Eric Clapton. They later altered the FTC into the F model—which has a flat back, a plainer fretboard, and with the cutaway an option. Lastly, they started collaborating with Tony Rice, building a model based on his Martin d-28, a guitar that has gotten some odd modifications done to it by various repairmen. Rice started touring with the guitar which led to the company receiving many phone calls. They realized they had a something offered by nobody else, and the Tony Rice model was introduced as a standard in 1981.

Richard Hoover bought out Bruce Ross in 1989 (who went on to pursue his current career in Family Therapy) and made several changes, for instance standardizing headstock shapes and neck widths on some models to get the amount of variation down. By the 1990s they had over 20 standard models, including 12 fret, smaller bodied guitars, and offered a variety of different customization options, including tone woods (Cocobolo, Ziricote, Brazilian, Figured Mahogany, etc.), custom neck shapes, inlays and custom voicing/bracing.

The company focuses on fine detail, and limits its size to maintain instrument quality. They have developed new designs and understanding of materials in pursuit of a greater variation in tone—because where guitars traditionally had to produce sufficient volume to compete with other instruments, smaller bodied guitars are now amplified if necessary. The company uses both reclaimed wood and responsibly harvested new wood, having had a "green philosophy […] from the company's beginning." Due to the company's reputation they are often approached by others who have wood available, as for instance when they in 2009 built guitars after accepting an offer of Brazilian rosewood harvested in the 1930s.

Their guitars are often perceived as expensive. Some of their well-known models having expensive options, e.g., one review lists the Don Edwards signature model "Cowboy Singer" at £4,300 (approx. US$6,850 as of March 2012). Other models are priced similar to equivalently featured instruments from other makers and can be found at stores like Eddie's Guitars and Dream Guitars.

== Notable players ==
- Alex Beaton
- Jack Black
- Bob Brozman
- Lloyd Cole
- Elvis Costello
- Disappear Fear (aka Sonia Rutstein)
- Don Edwards
- Jackie Greene
- Ben Harper
- Brad Paisley
- Robert Plant
- Tony Rice
- Arlen Roth
