= John & Tom =

John & Tom is a collaboration between actor John C. Reilly and American folk musician Tom Brosseau. It was produced and recorded in Nashville, Tennessee in 2011 by Jack White III and released on Third Man Records.

== Track listing ==
1. "Gonna Lay Down My Old Guitar" (Alton Delmore, Rabon Delmore)
2. "Lonesome Yodel Blues #2" (Alton Delmore, Rabon Delmore)

== Personnel ==
- Tom Brosseau – acoustic guitar, vocals
- John C. Reilly – acoustic guitar, vocals
- Jack White – drums, bass, organ
