= Dreadnought (guitar type) =

Type of acoustic guitar

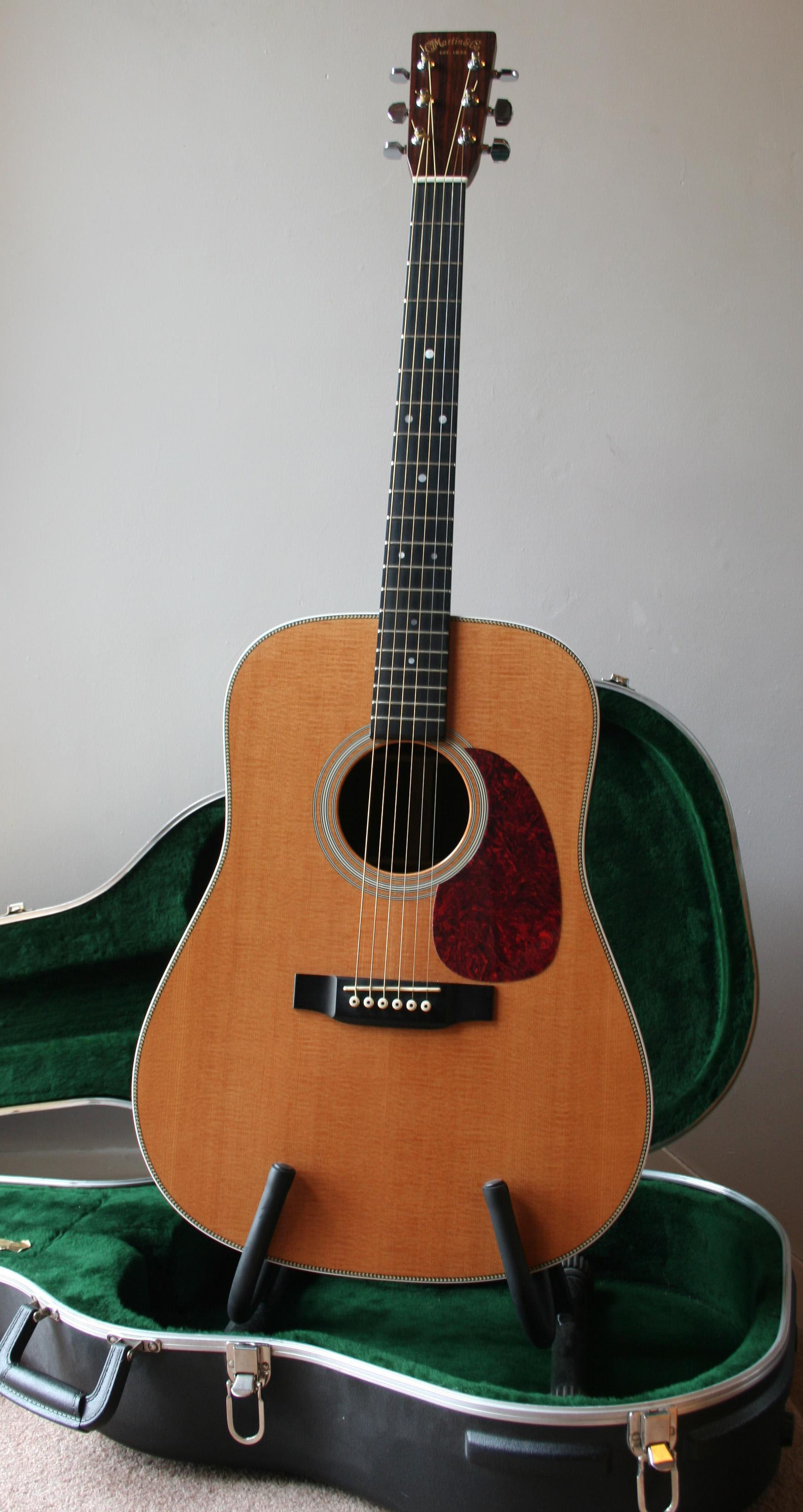
A modern style (14-fret) C.F. Martin & Company dreadnought

The dreadnought is a type of flat top acoustic guitar developed by American guitar manufacturer C.F. Martin & Company. The style, since copied by other guitar manufacturers, has become one of the most common for acoustic guitars. In its most frequently encountered shape it is characterized by square shoulders, a relatively flat tail end, a wide waist with a large radius curve, and a 14-fret neck (i.e., 14 frets clear of the body) although when first introduced, the body was longer, with round shoulders, and only 12 frets clear of the body. At the time of its creation in 1916 the word dreadnought referred to a large, all big-gun, modern battleship of the type pioneered by HMS Dreadnought in 1906. A body much larger than most other (non archtop) guitars of the time provided the dreadnought with a bolder, perhaps richer, and often louder tone.

== History ==
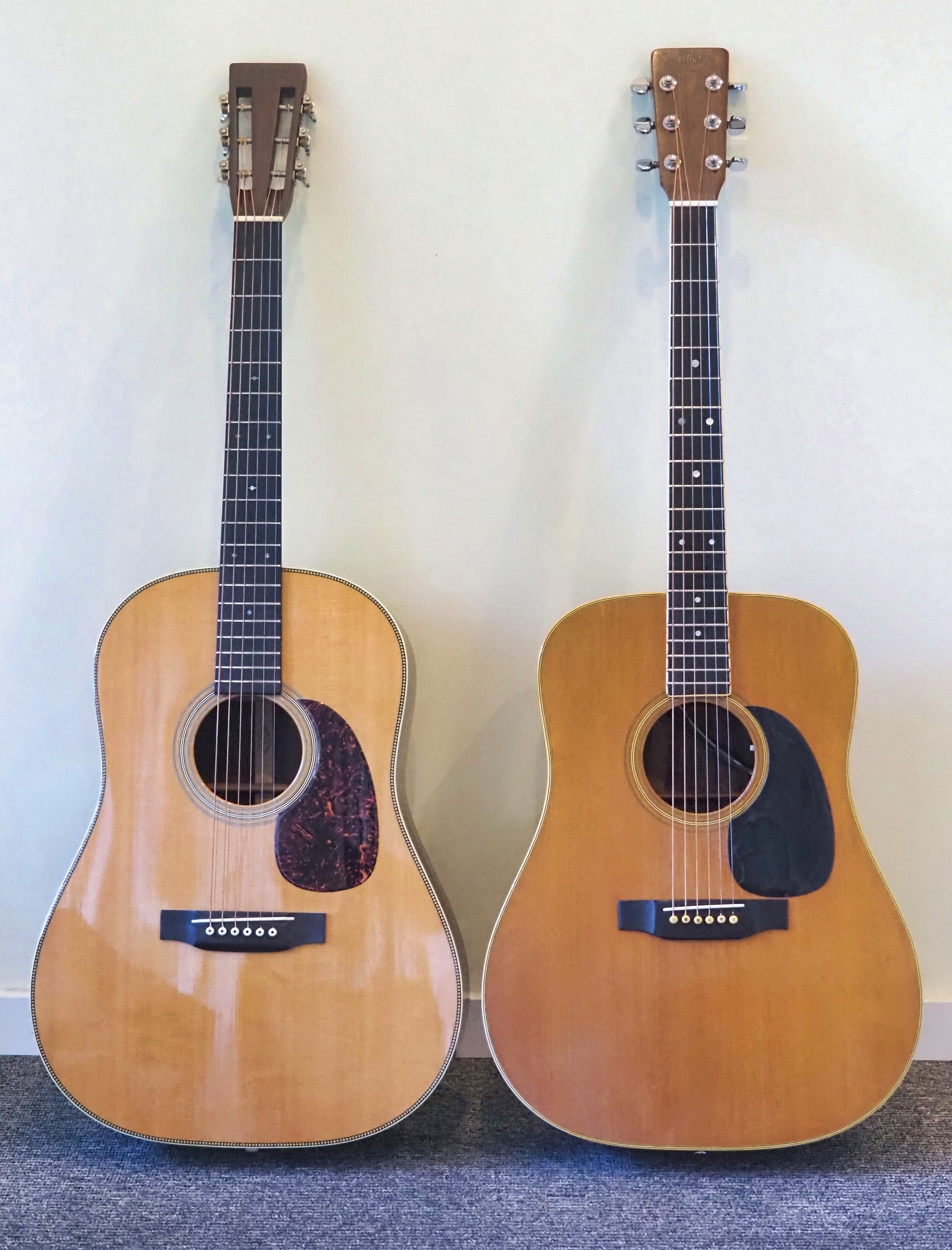
Martin dreadnought acoustic guitar body shapes: "original" 12-fret / larger body shape on left, 14-fret "square shoulder" (=modern) body shape on right; these examples are a 2000s Martin HD-28VS (left: -S designation is for the 12-fret version) and a 1970s D-35.

Prior to around 1900, Martin acoustic guitars were available in sizes that to today's players would seem very small, ranging from size 5, 4, 3, 2 1/2 and 2 (all 12 in or 300 mm or less across the lower bout) to size 1 (12 3/4 in or 320 mm). Larger sizes, introduced by 1898, were size 0 (13 1/2 in or 340 mm), size 00 (14 1/8 in or 360 mm), size 000 (15 in or 380 mm) and, subsequently, the 12-fret D plus its successor, the 14-fret D (both 15 5/8 in or 400 mm at the widest point). In fact, the first model to be produced in the "dreadnought" size was the largest of several models manufactured by Martin for the Oliver Ditson Company; of the nine models catalogued (1, 11, 111; 2, 22, 222; 3, 33, 333) the 111, 222 and 333 shared the large (dreadnought) dimension and differed only in the degree of ornamentation. Although catalogued, it seems that no "333" Ditson models were ever shipped, although some may have been; C.F. Martin finally produced a guitar to this specification, the Martin Ditson 333, as a limited run (22 instruments only) in 2008.

The dreadnought guitar was first announced in the Music Trades Review on August 19, 1916, with the copy reading as follows: "New Use Found for Steel Guitar..." "A new steel guitar called the "Dreadnought," and said to produce the biggest tone of any instrument of its kind, is now being used in the making of phonograph records. It is also said to be an excellent instrument for use in auditoriums and large halls. Chas H. Ditson & Co. will soon have the above instrument ready for delivery..." (The designation "steel guitar" is taken to indicate that the instrument was intended to be played with a steel bar, that is, in the Hawaiian style which was popular at the time.) The supplier of this information also states that Harry L. Hunt, the manager of the Ditson New York City Store, may have been inspired to order a guitar to be built to this design as a cross between an extra-large, but narrow waisted guitar already built by Martin for the Hawaiian guitarist Mekia Kealakaʻi, and the smaller, but wide waisted designs already being sold by Ditson.

These guitars were produced by Martin for Ditson from 1916 to 1921; a small number (19 instruments) were subsequently made in the same style as the 111, in dreadnought size, between 1921 and 1930, including #19734 for Roy Smeck. According to Mike Longworth, the design for the "111" size, later to become famous as the dreadnought, was suggested to Martin by Hunt, and "most likely" prototyped by Martin worker John Deichman. (Note: According to Deichman, he had already produced the first guitar in the size subsequently known as "dreadnought" for his own interest in 1916, and this was the instrument then seen by Hunt on his wall in the Martin factory, although his instrument - subsequently featured in "Frets" magazine and later offered for sale via Gruhn Guitars following restoration - actually appears to be dated 1917. In addition, Deichman's instrument featured a mahogany top, and was apparently intended for Hawaiian (slide) playing, with a high nut and frets more for visual guidance than use. Nevertheless, Deichman's instrument is clearly a fascinating piece of Martin guitar history.) Up to 1923, the early dreadnought-size guitars constructed by Martin were fan braced, not X-braced, that innovation being first combined with the "dreadnought size" body in 1924.

In 1931 Martin began producing dreadnought guitars (sometimes also spelled "dreadnaught") under its own name, the first two models named the D-1 and D-2, with bodies made of mahogany and rosewood respectively; later that year, these two styles were renamed the D-18 and D-28 with "D" indicating body size, and the numbers the timbers used and degree of ornamentation as per other Martin models of the time. Like their Ditson-branded precursors, these two models had large bodies, with neck joining the body at the 12th fret, and slotted headstocks holding the tuning mechanisms for the strings. According to production totals given in Longworth's book, numbers of these early, 12-fret dreadnought guitars were not large, being just two D-1s, seven D-2s, 64 D-18s and 82 D-28s, the latter including 65 produced in 1934-1936. Commencing in 1934, responding to a preference from players (especially those transitioning from the banjo) for more frets clear of the body, the body shape was changed to a shorter, squarer shouldered design, which—in conjunction with a changed neck position (the neck was moved outwards a little from the body, resulting in a slightly higher bridge placement relative to the lower bout)—permitted the neck to join the body at the 14th rather than the 12th fret, resulting in improved left hand access to the highest frets (refer illustration). (Note: The Martin designers achieved the desired 2-fret extension (1 3/8 in or 35 mm at this point) clear of the body by a combination of methods: approximately two-thirds of the required extension was obtained by making the body shorter by 15/16 in (24 mm), while the remainder was obtained by moving the bridge around 7/16 in (11 mm) closer to the soundhole (in effect moving the entire neck further out from the body), thus obtaining the desired extra frets clear of the body while retaining the original scale length. However, the alteration to body size, plus the slightly different position of the bridge, result in some changes to the loudness/responsiveness to particular playing styles, and tonal character between the 12-fret and 14-fret versions. Both 12-fret and 14-fret dreadnoughts have the same scale length at 25.4 in (650 mm) while the 14-fret dreadnought body length, at 20 in (510 mm), is shorter than that for the 12-fret version which is 20 15/16 in (532 mm).) The "14 fret" design has become the standard for most succeeding instruments manufactured to the "D" body size, although the "12 fret" design has been retained in the Martin line for some special orders, certain 12-string models, and the "-S" designated D-18S, D-28S, D-35S and D-45S, with the "S" suffix, originally just denoting any non-standard custom feature, stabilizing as denoting the 12-fret variant from 1967 onwards. A small run of dreadnought guitars manufactured by Martin for the E.U. Wurlitzer store in Boston designated "SW" for "Special Wurlitzer" in the early 1960s also featured the 12-fret design.

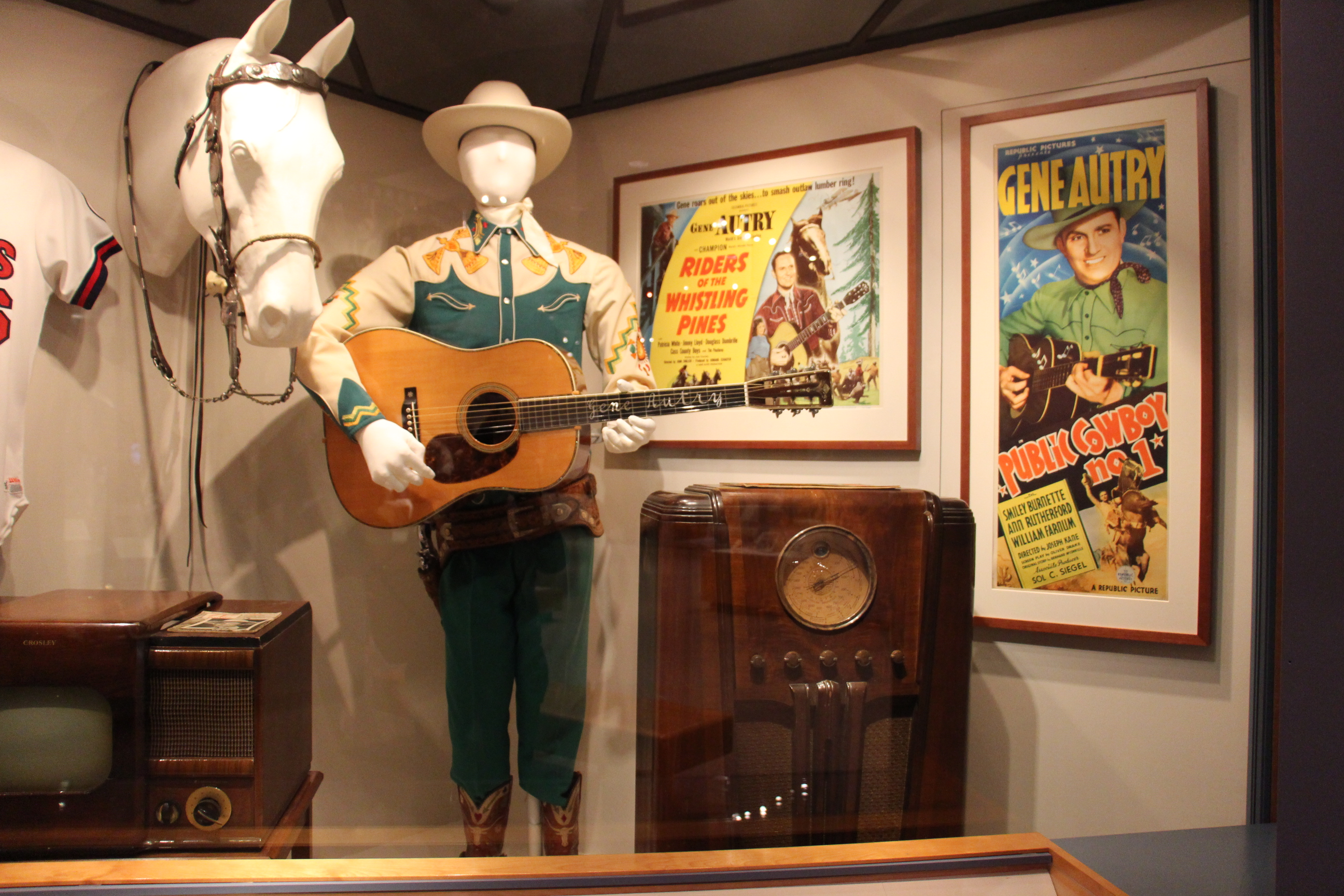
Gene Autry memorabilia (posters, costume, radio and guitar) on display in the Autry National Center in Los Angeles, California, including the first Martin D-45 ever made, a 12-fret example

Early in their production (e.g. between 1931 and 1934), Martin seems not to have had much faith in these "extra large" guitars, making them only on special order (even the "000" size was considered large by the standards of the day) and to one interested customer writing in 1933 that the firm considered the dreadnought "a bass guitar, not suitable for solo playing". However perceptions changed when the then hugely popular Gene Autry, singing star of stage and screen, wanted a new guitar, of style 45 (Martin's most ornate) and ordered a custom instrument of that style in Martin's new, largest size. Thus, the D-45 was born, Autry's 12-fret example being the first, and soon other country singers in particular wanted the large size instruments, which proved effective in sound carrying power (particularly for vocal accompaniment) over the otherwise primitive stage amplification systems of the day.

The 1936 Martin Catalog lists only two dreadnoughts, the D-18 at $65.00 (approx. $1,445 in 2024 dollars) and the D-28 at $100.00 (approx. $2,223 in 2024 dollars), although the D-45 was also available at that time to special order only. A later 1930s catalog does include the D45 at $225.00, by which time the prices of the D-18 and D-28 had increased to $75.00 and $115.00, respectively.

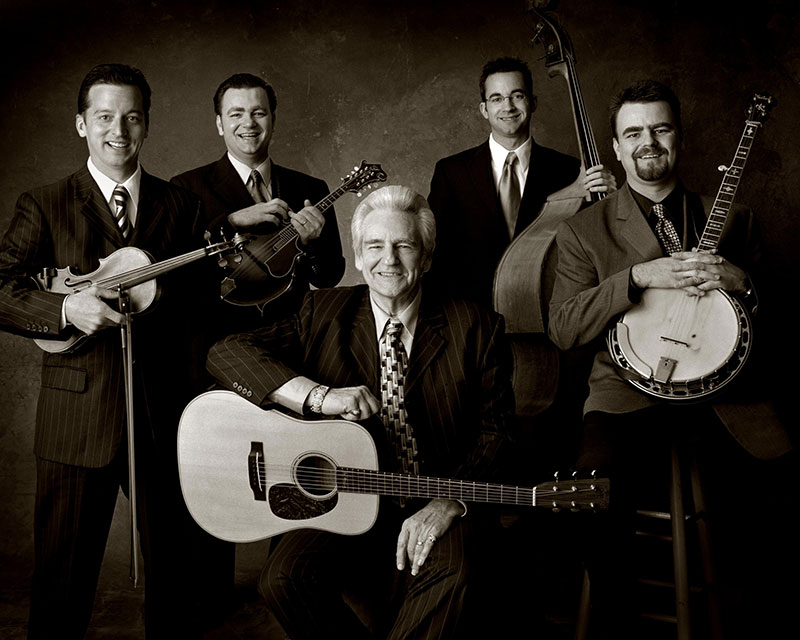
The classic Bluegrass band instrumentation (Del McCoury Band): fiddle, mandolin, double bass, five string banjo, and Del McCoury with dreadnought Martin guitar

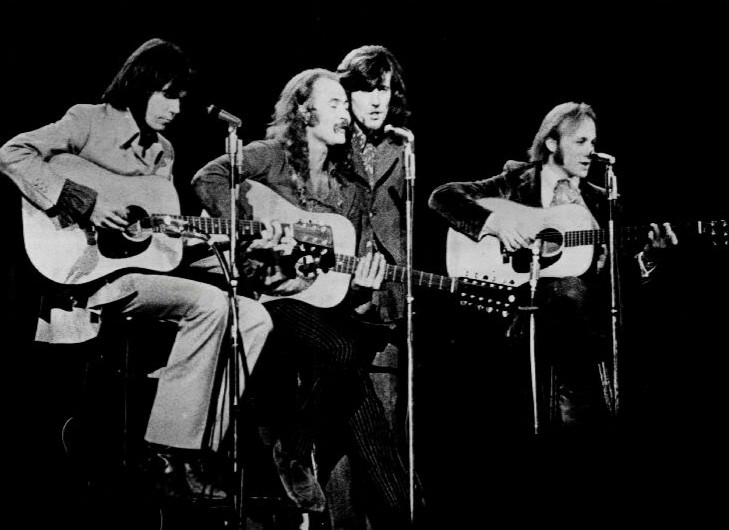
Crosby Stills Nash and Young 1970

Having to compete with intrinsically loud instruments such as the 5-string banjo, often in generally "acoustic" settings, from the late 1930s onwards dreadnoughts became the standard guitar of bluegrass music, and were used by many bluegrass musicians to produce a signature sound.

The popularity of, and demand for, Martin dreadnought guitars was increased by their use by folk and popular musicians of the mid-20th century, such as Paul Simon, Joni Mitchell, Crosby, Stills, Nash and Young, and Van Morrison as well as in the early rock and roll field by artists such as Elvis Presley. While most players prefer the tone of the standard, 14-fret instrument, noted for its more penetrating sound especially when played with other instruments, a few prominent players—including Peter Yarrow of the group Peter, Paul and Mary, Norman Blake, and on occasion Paul Simon (per the cover of his 1974 Live Rhymin' release)—have still favoured the slightly different sonority produced by the 12-fret, larger body shape.

The Gibson Guitar Company's response to the Martin dreadnought was the round-shouldered Jumbo, which it introduced in 1934. It introduced its first square shouldered guitar, the Hummingbird, in 1960. Guild also offered "dreadnought" size guitars from 1964 onwards, their D-40 and D-50 offerings (in mahogany and rosewood bodies, respectively) closely paralleling the Martin D-18 and D-28, and being described as "Guild's improved version of the popular dreadnaught guitar".

Since then, dreadnoughts have been made by a majority of guitar manufacturers worldwide in both standard and single-cutaway forms; among high grade "boutique" makers of dreadnought-style guitars are the Gallagher Guitar Company (whose instruments were endorsed by Doc Watson), the Santa Cruz Guitar Company (whose line includes a Tony Rice model), Mossman Guitars, and Dana Bourgeois, whose signature model for Ricky Skaggs is well regarded. Younger players such as Billy Strings and Molly Tuttle have both had their own instruments, plus limited edition signature dreadnought model runs created by the guitar manufacturer Preston Thompson.

Up to approximately the mid 1970s, dreadnought guitars from Martin, the original maker, were available in a fairly basic set of model styles, comprising the "D" designation for body size, plus the numeric designation—drawn from the range 18, 21, 28, 35, 41 and 45—indicating the degree of ornamentation, and wood used for the body construction (custom models were also sometimes available upon request); the D-45, however, was out of production between 1943 and early 1968, in which year it was re-introduced to the Martin line. The D-21 was introduced in 1955, while the D-35, a new model and style designation, was added to the line in 1966; 12-string models, a favourite of the "folk boom" of the late 1950s and 1960s, were first made in 1954 on a limited basis, and were added to the official line in 1964 with the D12-20 (a 12-fret model), followed by the D12-35 in 1965, D12-45 in 1969, and D12-41 in 1970; following user demand for 14-fret models, the D12-28 was introduced in 1970, followed by the D12-18 in 1973, both of which had 14 frets clear of the body. By contrast, in more recent decades the range has grown massively; a 2024 query to the Martin website yields 170 varieties of 14-fret dreadnoughts (including discontinued models) plus a further 6 12-fret models (and this list is not complete). Further information on these instruments is available on the website of the manufacturer and of various resellers, while other stores such as Gruhn Guitars and Carter Vintage Guitars offer a glimpse into the world of vintage and/or collectable guitars, the most valuable of which are frequently Martin dreadnoughts from the classic "pre-war" (pre 1942 in collector's terminology) manufacturing period. (Note: At time of writing (May 2026), the most valuable vintage acoustic guitars listed (by model) comprise the Martin D-45 (up to $675,000 highest quoted value for an example in excellent condition, 1936–early 1939), the Martin D-28 (up to $350,000 highest quoted value for an example in excellent condition, 1931–1936), and the Martin D-18 (up to $180,000 highest quoted value for an example in excellent condition, 1934 dark top). By contrast, as at September 2025 the "standard series" (new) D-18 lists for $2,499–$3,099 depending on specifications, the D-28 for $2,899–$3,499 and the D-45 "Modern Deluxe" for $10,699, per the 2025 C.F. Martin website.)

== Construction ==
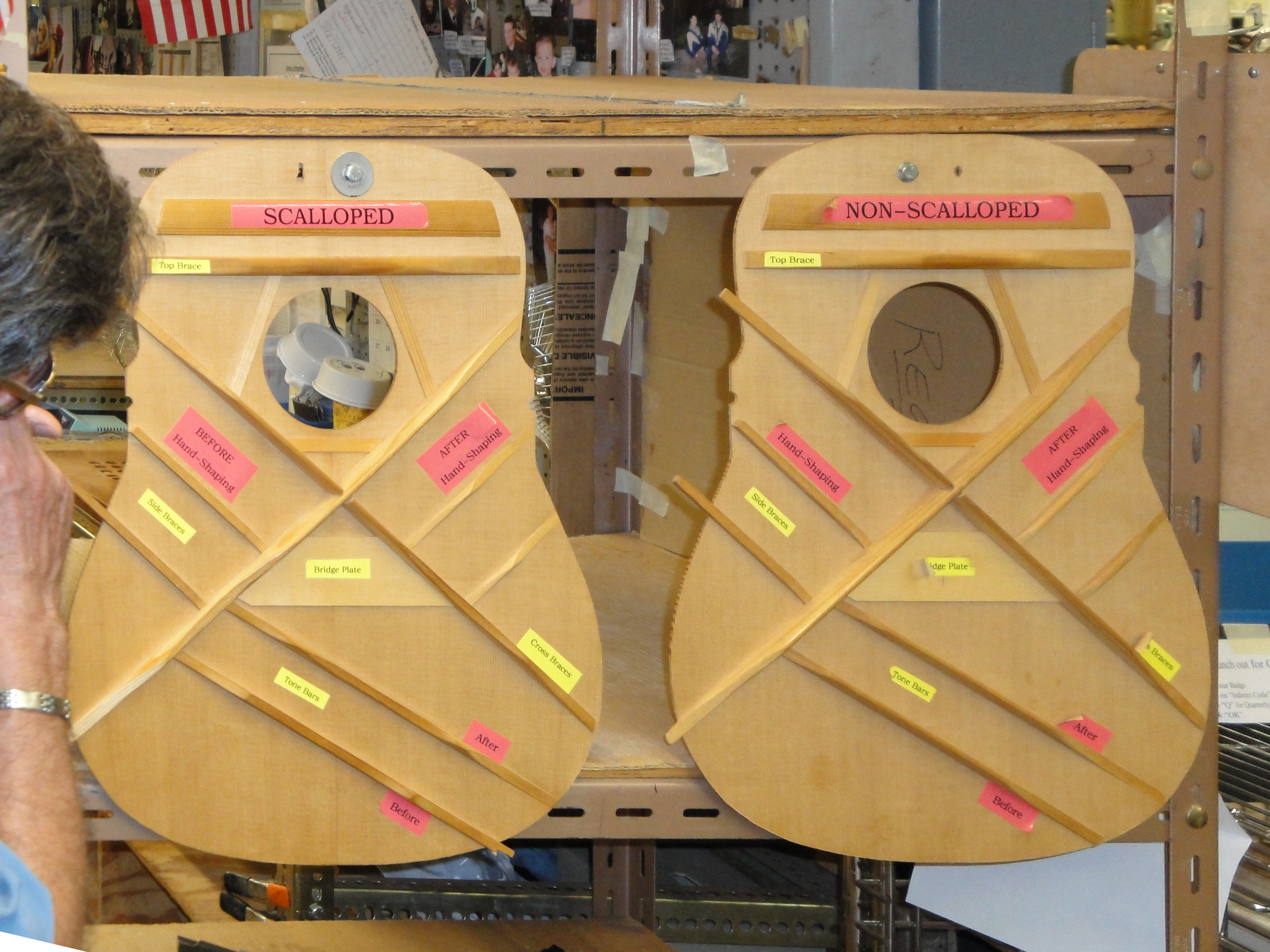
Top bracing on Martin dreadnought guitars - scalloped (left) and non scalloped versions

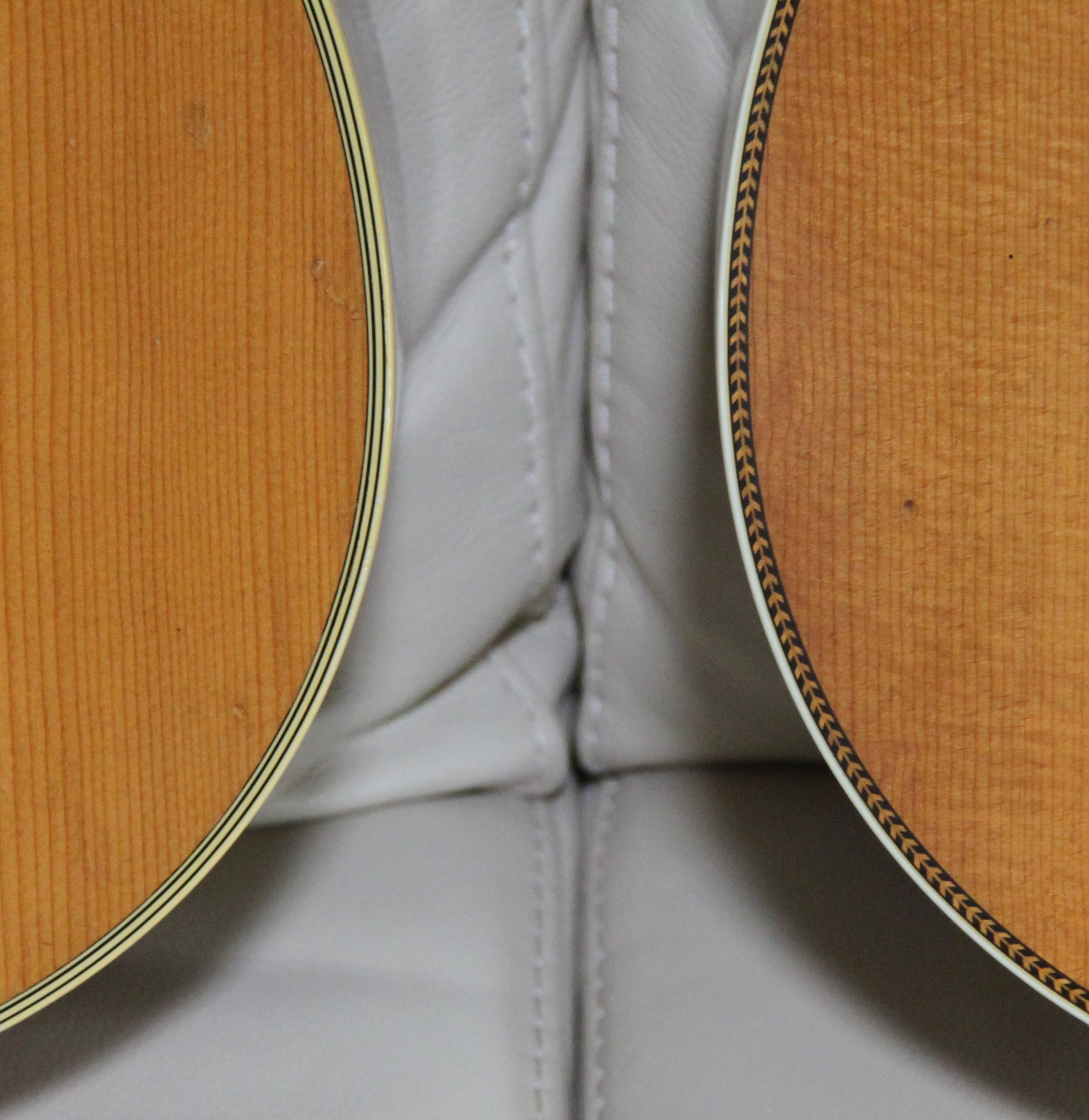
Martin dreadnought bindings - D-35 (left) vs herringbone HD-28 (right)

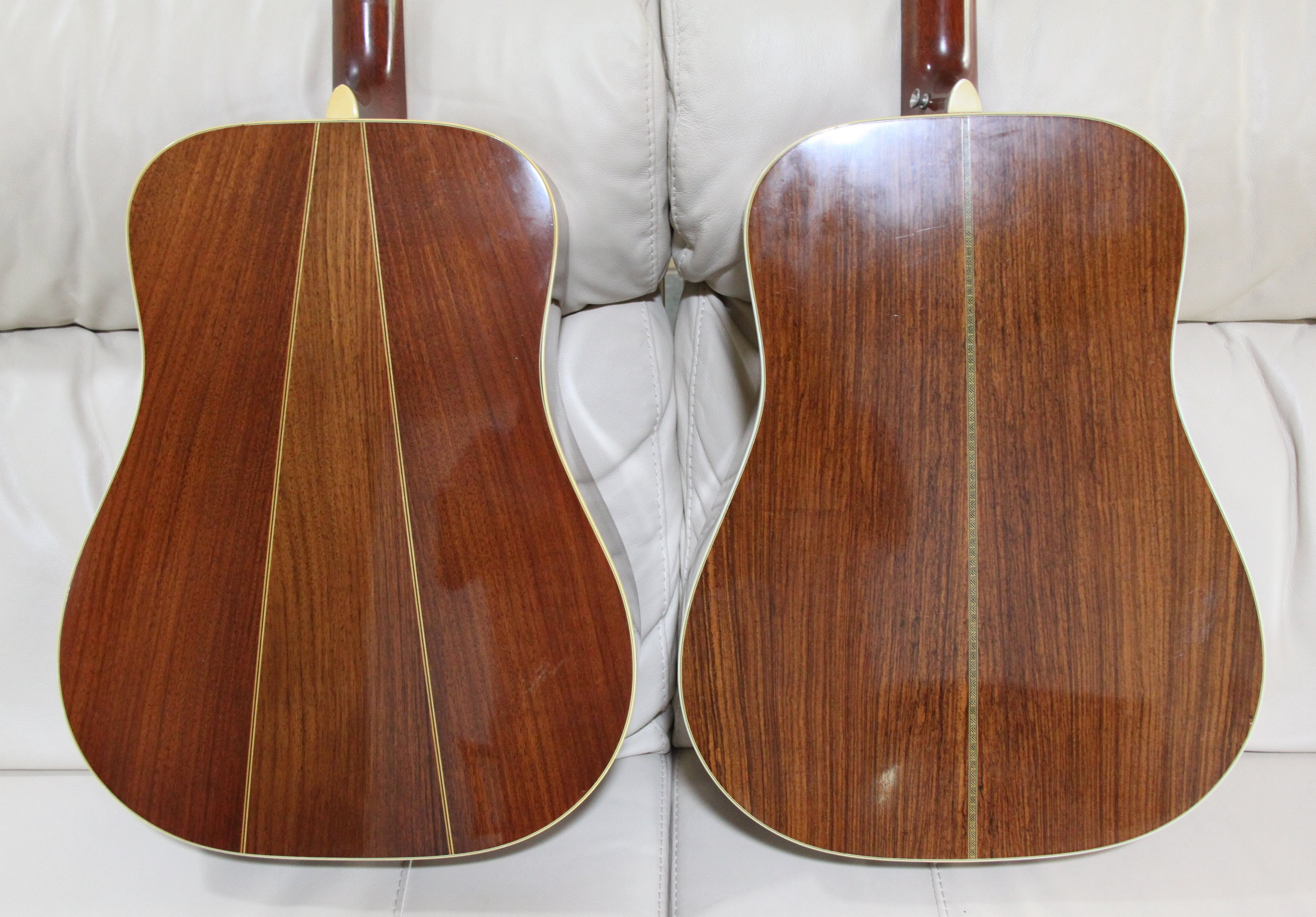
2 Martin dreadnought guitars from rear showing 3-piece vs 2-piece backs

Martin dreadnought guitars feature the Martin-developed "X-braced" top which, together with additional tone bars and braces, permit the traditional "dreadnought" sound to be produced (refer illustration). Note, the two lowest tone bars are asymmetric and are typically reversed for a left-handed model. Up until late 1944, the main X-braces were "scalloped" (selected areas reduced in mass) to achieve the best tonal response, but following that date the braces were first merely tapered, then left unscalloped to produce a more robust instrument that would withstand the use of heavy gauge strings without causing warranty work, which the company was keen to avoid; this makes the historic instruments manufactured between 1933 and 1944 of the highest value to both collectors and players. Overlapping this period, Martin D-28 guitars were fitted with a distinctive "herringbone" trim around their body, accounting for them being alternatively referred to as "herringbones" in popular usage, although the herringbone trim was not discontinued until early 1947, so some of the last years of production of "herringbone" guitars (prior to that feature's reintroduction in the 1970s on select models) feature the herringbone binding only, but not the more desirable, scalloped bracing attribute.

Scalloped bracing was reintroduced on selected new models (designated the HD-28 and HD-35) in 1976 in response to player demand; such instruments are advised to only be strung with light or medium gauge strings. The "H" portion of the "HD" designation refers to the use of herringbone trim, which roughly coincided with the use of the original scalloped bracing in the pre-1945 models, and was reintroduced in relevant new scalloped braced instruments as a cosmetic indicator of their construction type. Prior to mid 1939, the X-braces crossed at a position 1 in (25 mm) from the soundhole (known as "high X" or "forward shifted" bracing), being moved back a little towards the lower bout (now 1 3/4 in (44 mm) from the soundhole) after this date., a position known as "rear shifted" bracing; around 1960 the braces were shifted again to cross 1 1/2 in (38 mm) from the soundhole, a position known as "standard" or "non forward shifted" bracing, although more recently (commencing in the 1990s on some lines, complete by 2018 with the "reimagined Standard Series") most Martin Dreadnoughts are being made with forward shifted bracing once more without special comment (in effect, a change to a new definition of "standard bracing").

Other key developments of interest to both players and collectors was a switch from Brazilian to Indian rosewood (for the rosewood instruments, D-28 and upwards) in late 1969, and from a small maple bridgeplate to a larger rosewood one in 1968. Both of these changes have generally been seen as undesirable from a tonal viewpoint, leading to considerably more interest (and higher sale prices) for pre-1969 instruments than their later counterparts (Brazilian rosewood, now rare and expensive, has nevertheless been used since on some expensive models and special editions).

Almost all Martin dreadnoughts have been manufactured with a 2-piece back, with the exception of the D-35 (introduced 1965) plus its later variants such as the HD-35 which feature a 3-piece back; the original rationale given for this was to be able to utilize narrow strips of Brazilian rosewood that could not be used for the "traditional" 2-piece backs, however with the changeover to Indian rosewood this justification disappeared (although for a while during the changeover period, a combination of center Brazilian, with outside Indian rosewood strips was used). The D-35 has slightly narrower top braces (1/4 in or 6.4 mm rather than the 5/16 in or 7.9 mm used for other models) which, together with the different bracing of the back, may contribute to its different tonal response in comparison with other rosewood models featuring the 2-piece back.

Timbers other than rosewood and mahogany can, of course, be used for the back and sides of a dreadnought-style guitar, but in general terms have never been acceptable for producing the "classic" dreadnought sound (see next section). In addition, many cheaper, dreadnought-style guitars, in particular those manufactured in Asia during the 1970s and 1980s, plus "economy" ranges from current manufacturers feature laminated rather than solid wood construction, for reasons of cost; while these can be visually attractive (especially if a suitable outermost layer is used), they again lack the sonic quality of their solid-wood equivalents and are generally not considered to be professional grade instruments.

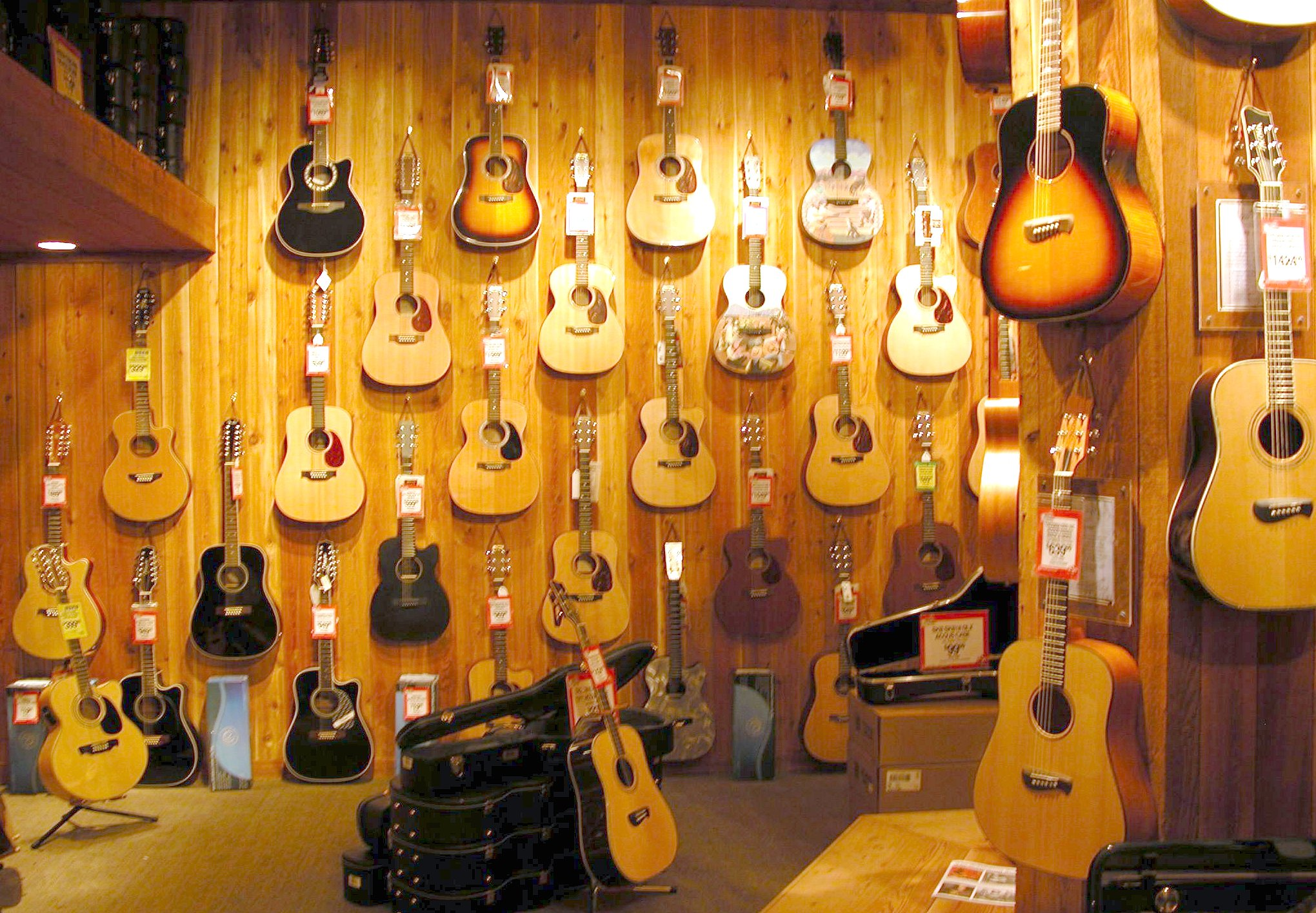
Acoustic guitars on a guitar shop wall in Texas, 2002. Cutaways are visible on some, but by no means all, of the dreadnought-size guitars shown.

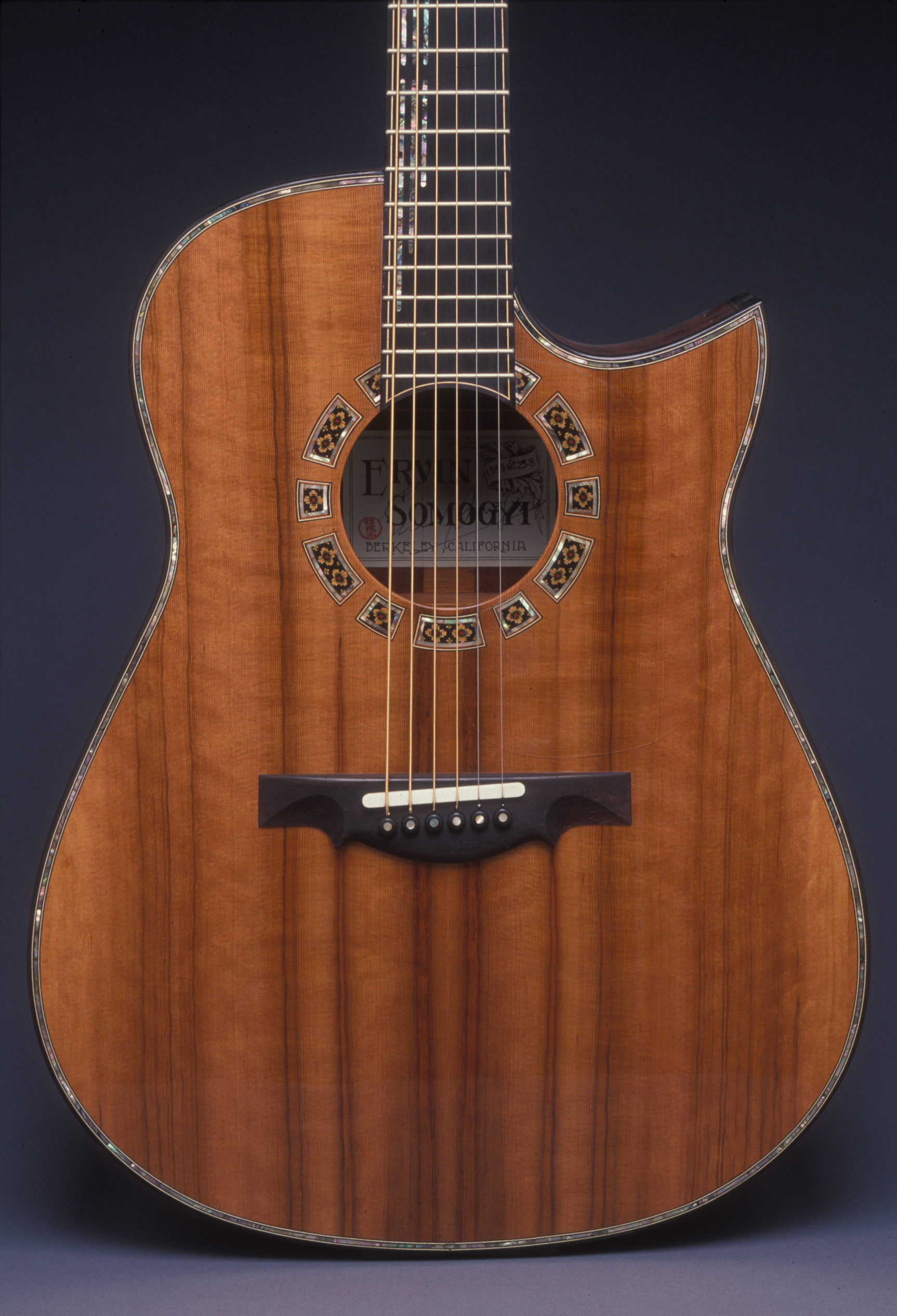
A custom cutaway dreadnought guitar by luthier Ervin Somogyi, in this instance featuring a sharp-pointed ("florentine") cutaway.

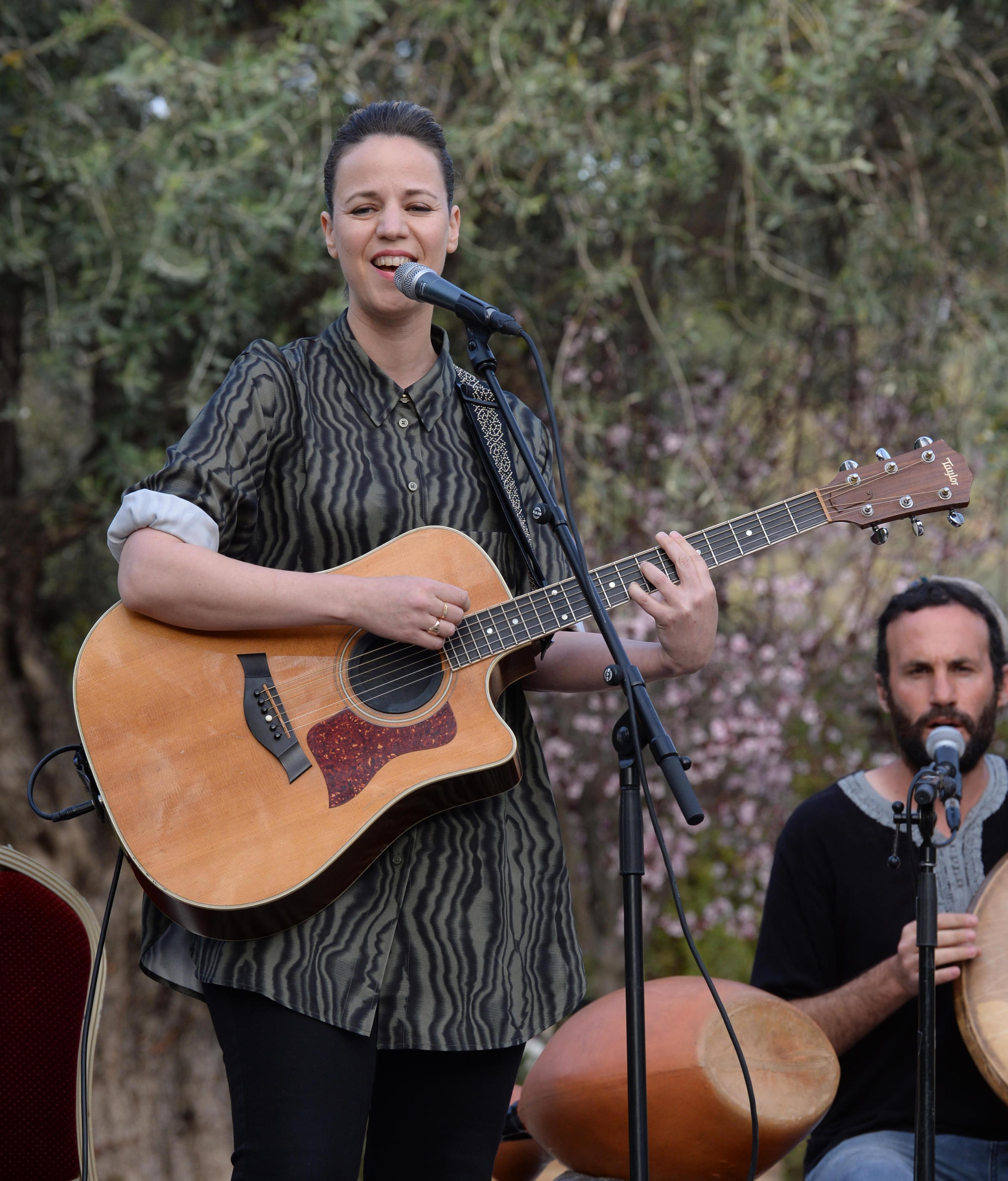
A performer with a Taylor cutaway dreadnought model

Cutaways are sometimes offered on dreadnought guitars, especially in more recent decades (1990s to current), although in bluegrass music at least, use of non-cutaway guitars continues to be preferred as more "traditional" (as exceptions, both Doc Watson and Dan Crary have performed many times with cutaway instruments). As originators of the design, Martin introduced a model DC-28 with cutaway and oval soundhole (1981–1997) followed by some relatively short lived introductions with regular sound holes, the Martin DC-18E (2017–2019), DC-28E/HDC-28E (?2016–2019) and DC-35E (2016–2019), while cutaway models are still available in several of that manufacturer's cheaper ranges; meanwhile a number of their competitors offer cutaways on many of their instruments, including the dreadnought-size models, and appear to cater well to buyers of their particular brand. The addition of a well executed cutaway is generally considered to have minimal acoustic impact on a guitar's tone or volume, so its desirability rests on the potential buyer's personal aesthetic preference coupled with the possible desire to more easily access the highest frets on occasion.

== Sound character ==
As with all wooden instruments, the sound of any guitar type varies from individual instrument to instrument, model to model, maker to maker, year/era to era as well as (in particular) choice of tonewoods and internal bracing pattern, however owners, retailers and makers typically agree that the dreadnought style (with instruments constructed according to the "classic" formula of a spruce top over a rosewood or mahogany body) offers the most powerful acoustic guitar sound available, with a pronounced bass end and acoustic volume especially in comparison to smaller models (the booming bass can also be perceived as a disadvantage for some use cases). The "Pre-war Guitar Company" of North Carolina, U.S.A. who specialise in modern reproductions of "classic era" Martin dreadnoughts as well as other instruments, describe their mahogany body (D-18 style) reproduction as "dry and clear, with some sweetness around the edge", the Adirondack spruce/Brazilian rosewood body dread (vintage D-28 style) as having "a big bark, but lots of warmth as well", while the 12-fret dreadnought "has both sweetness and power that's unique to its design", [responding] "equally well to a light touch as a hard one". On the C.F. Martin website, comparing rosewood (typical of the D-28 and upwards) with mahogany (as used for the D-18), the company states: "Brazilian rosewood is complex in tone and appearance. ... Its rich overtones, long sustain, and deep resonance give players a beautiful balance of bass and treble", while "East Indian rosewood ... offers deep bass with rich overtones," whereas "a mahogany acoustic guitar has a loud sound, bright treble response, and punchy mid-range". According to T.S. Phillips, author of the "One Man's Guitar" site, "Guitars without scalloped braces are known for their strong fundamental notes with precisely defined tonal parameters to the bass, mid-range, and treble registers. ... The scallop-braced versions ... have more body resonance swelling out around those fundamental notes, with a complex blending of the registers, increased sonic reverberation, and a warmer bottom end." Of forward-shifted versus the later "standard", and/or rear-shifted bracing patterns, he writes: "Forward-shifted bracing provides less support to the area around the bridge plate, while also affecting the responsiveness of the large lower bout, e.g. the area of the top below guitar's waist. The result is enhanced flexibility in those areas for increased responsiveness, resulting in a throatier voice with greater bass response than guitars made with an X brace closer to the bridge plate [i.e., the bottom of the guitar]."

== Sound hole differences ==
Flatpicking legend Clarence White of the Kentucky Colonels owned a vintage 1935 Martin D-28, serial number 58957, the soundhole of which had been enlarged, apparently for cosmetic reasons since the border of the original soundhole had suffered damage. This instrument was subsequently acquired by the influential flatpicker Tony Rice who used it on the bulk of his recordings. The Santa Cruz Guitar Company built some replicas of this instrument for Rice, including the enlarged sound hole, which led to its addition to their catalog as a regular line, the Tony Rice model. Subsequently, some other manufacturers including Martin and Collings also offered some models with the "large sound hole" variant, considered by players to slightly rebalance the traditional dreadnought "bass heavy" sound a little more towards the midrange, as well as (possibly) increasing the audibility of the guitar to the player. These guitars have their adherents but have not generally supplanted standard-size soundhole models in the major manufacturers' ranges to date.

== Size variants ==
Martin did on occasion vary the specifications or size of their dreadnought guitars to a customer's special request, most notably (in this context) in 1936 when they produced two "wide body" dreadnoughts (of style 45) with a body width of 16 1/4 inches (410 mm) rather than the typical 15 5/8 inches (400 mm). Later, one of these two instruments was loaned to the C.F. Martin Museum in Nazareth, Pennsylvania and used as the basis of a modern reissue, the D-45S Authentic 1936, which again had the extra-wide 14-fret dreadnought body; this reissue is now discontinued.

In around 2016, Martin released a smaller size or "travel" version of their dreadnought guitar designated the Dreadnought Junior or D-Junior; while keeping the "standard" dreadnought shape, the instrument is approximately 6% (1/16) smaller in body shape and has the depth of a 000 size body; it also has a "short", 24-inch (610 mm) scale length as compared to the 25.4 inches (650 mm) of a standard dreadnought. These instruments are moderately priced compared with their full size equivalents and not designed to replace them except for portability, although they have been complemented on their generally good sound for their size.

In 2022, Martin released a "super size" dreadnought model, the SD or Super Dreadnought, with a 16 3/8 inches (420 mm) lower bout, stated to have approximately 20 percent more air volume within the body compared with the standard dreadnought, resulting in a louder acoustic volume for the same degree of player attack plus a slightly different tonal balance. At their initial release, the SD line was available with a sitka spruce top and a choice of Guatemalan rosewood or koa body, both in the "three piece back" style which means that it can continue to be built if wide pieces become harder to source in the future. These instruments remain in catalog as at 2025.

== Gallery ==
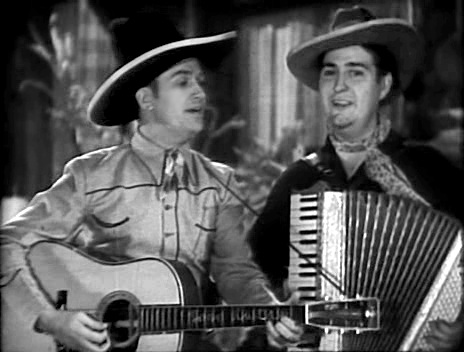
Gene Autry (with Smiley Burnette, right) performs in a 1934 movie using his special order 1933 Martin D-45 style dreadnought guitar, the first one ever made

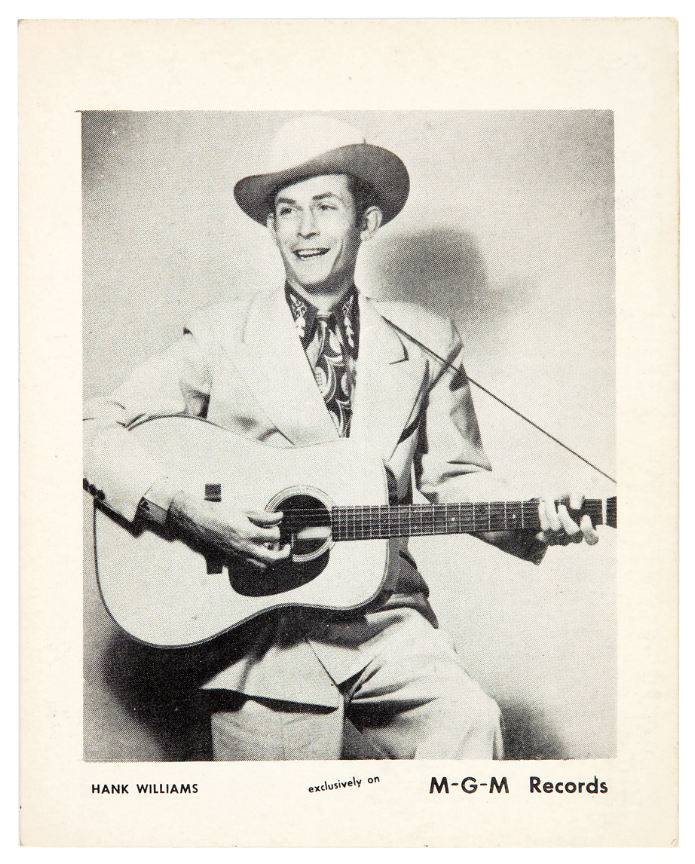
Hank Williams, 1952, with Martin D-28 guitar

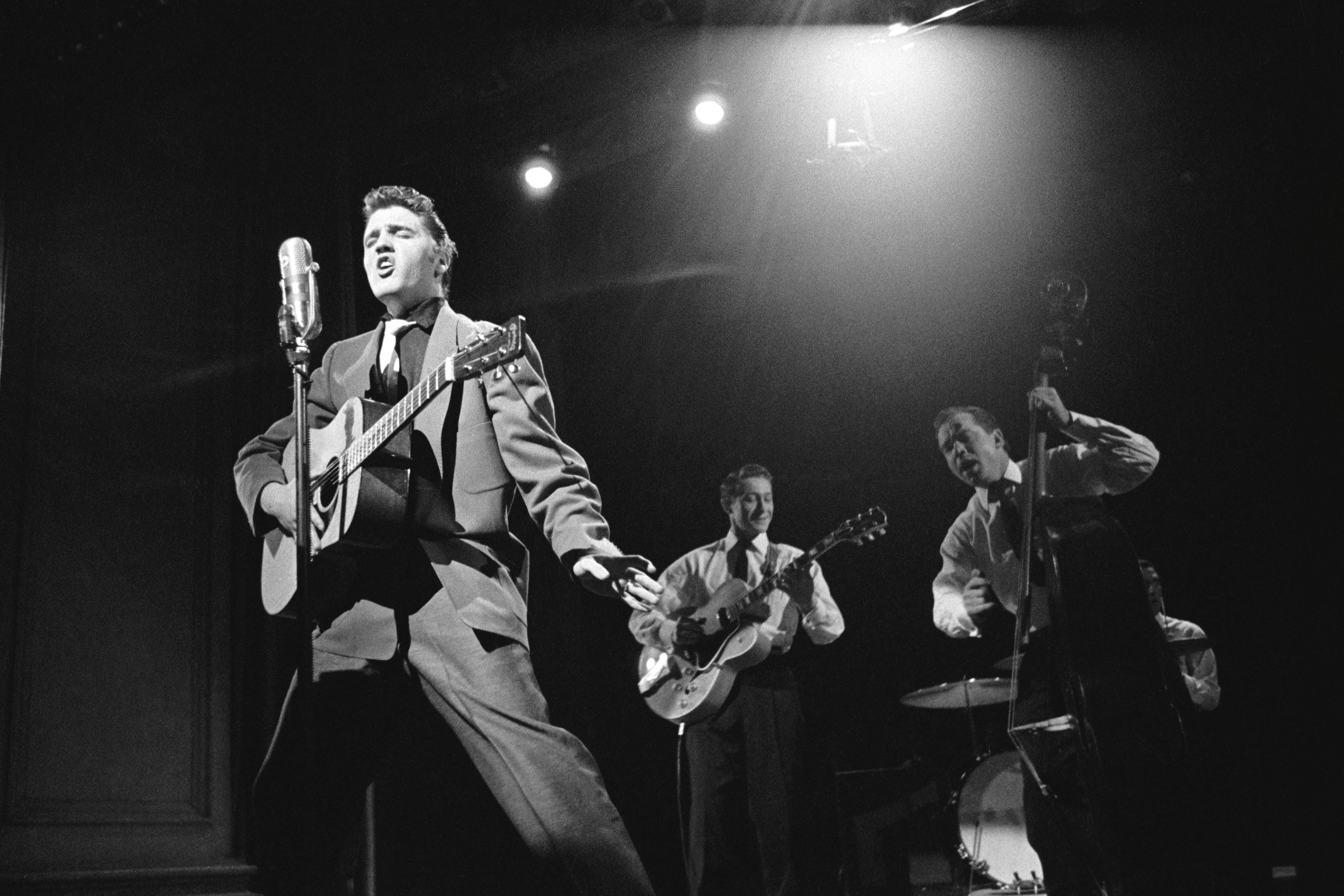
Elvis Presley and band (Elvis with Martin D-18 guitar), September 1956

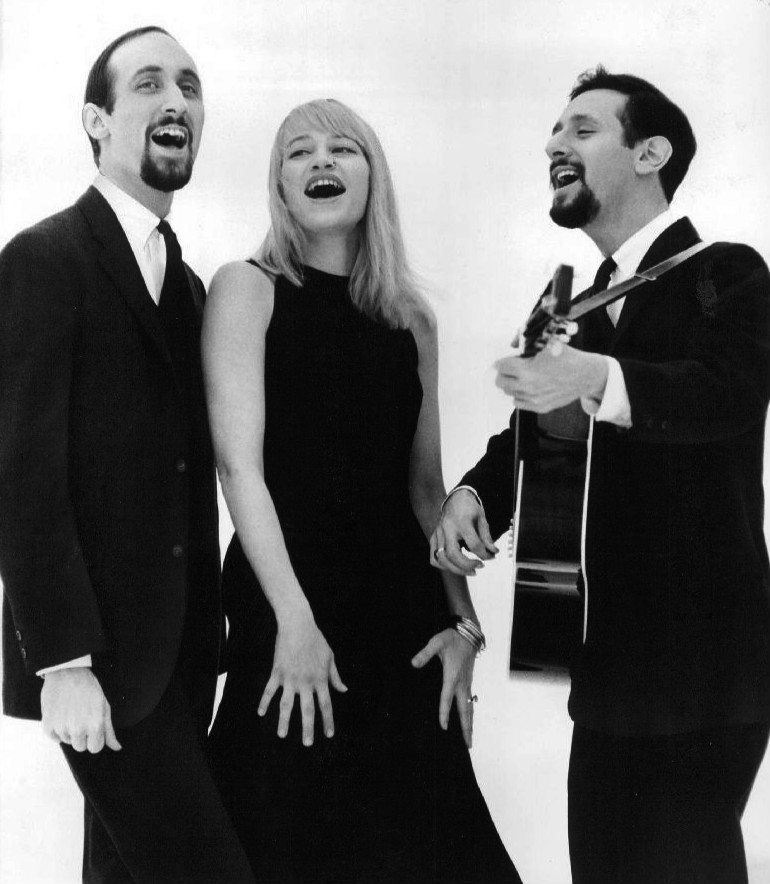
Popular folk trio Peter, Paul and Mary in 1963; Peter Yarrow (right) was a well-known user of the Martin D-28 in its 12-fret variant (in his case, a custom order 1962 D-28S)

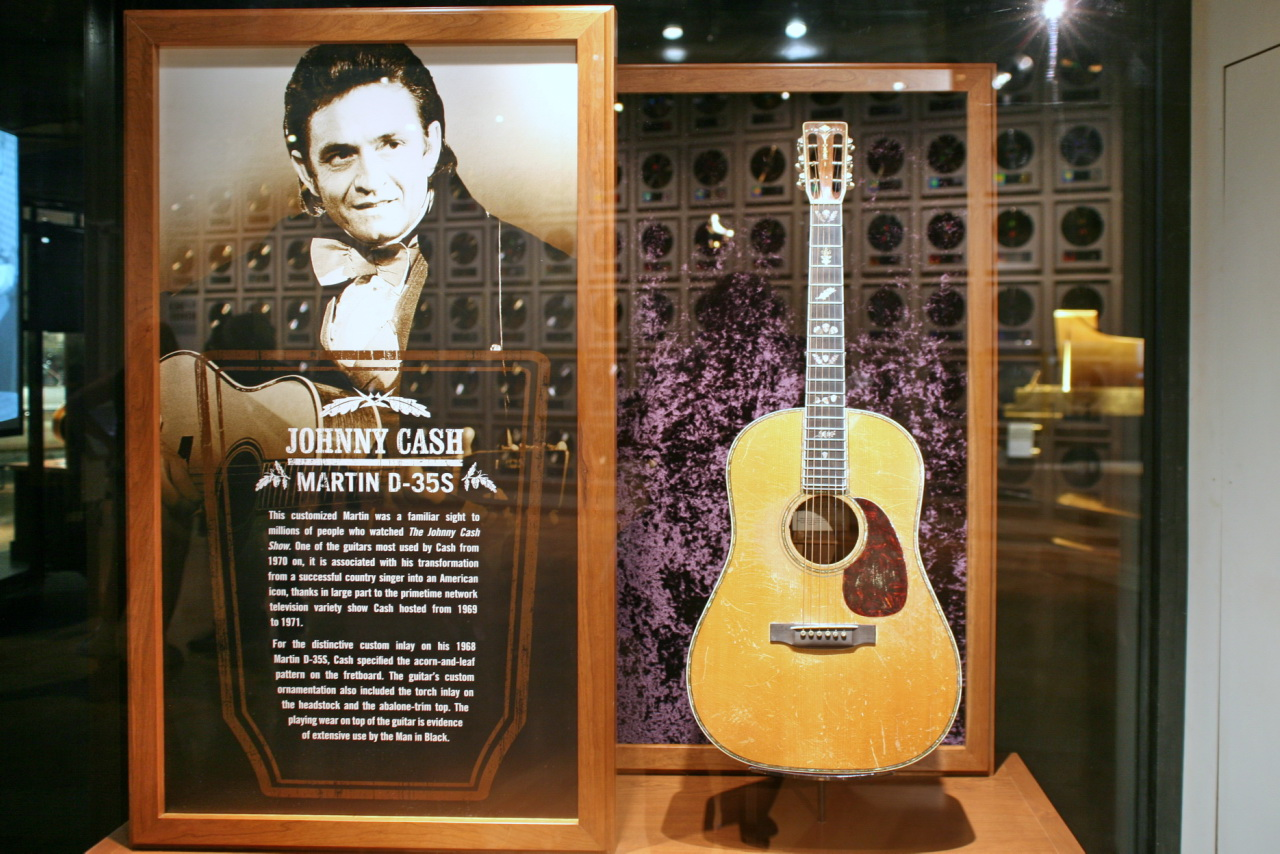
Johnny Cash's custom order Martin D-35S (1968), photographed at the Country Music Hall of Fame

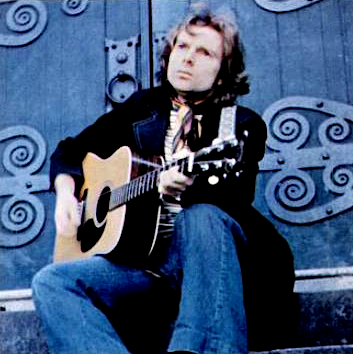
Van Morrison plays his Martin D-28 dreadnought in 1971/1972 (image used for cover of his 1972 album "Saint Dominic's Preview")

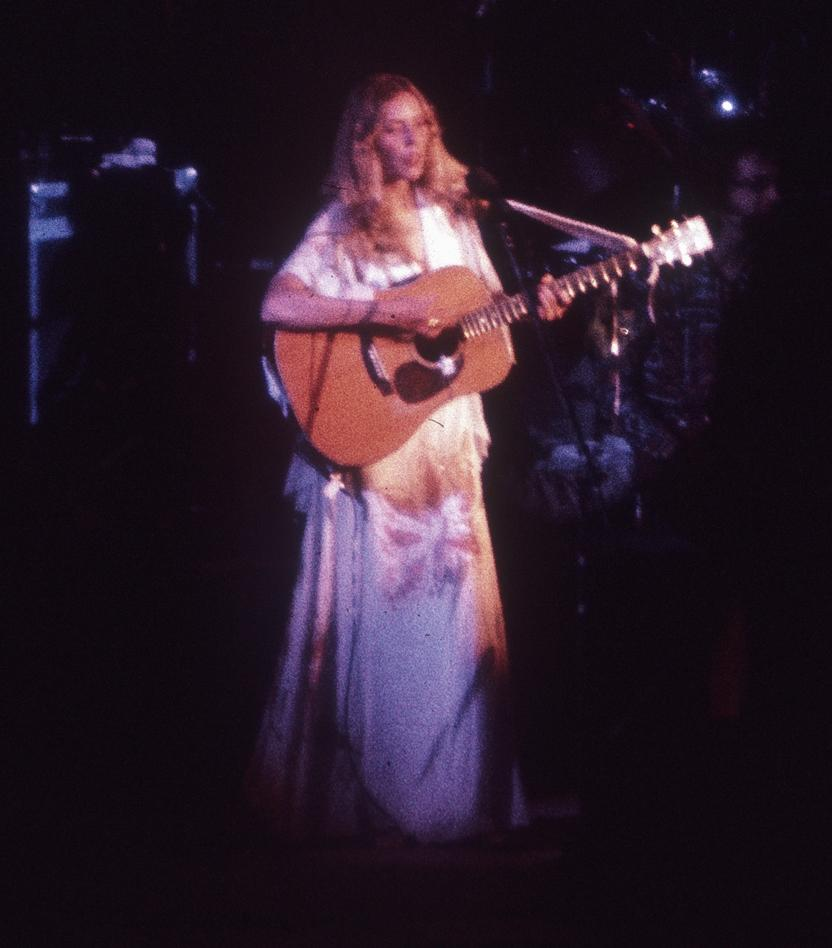
Joni Mitchell in 1974

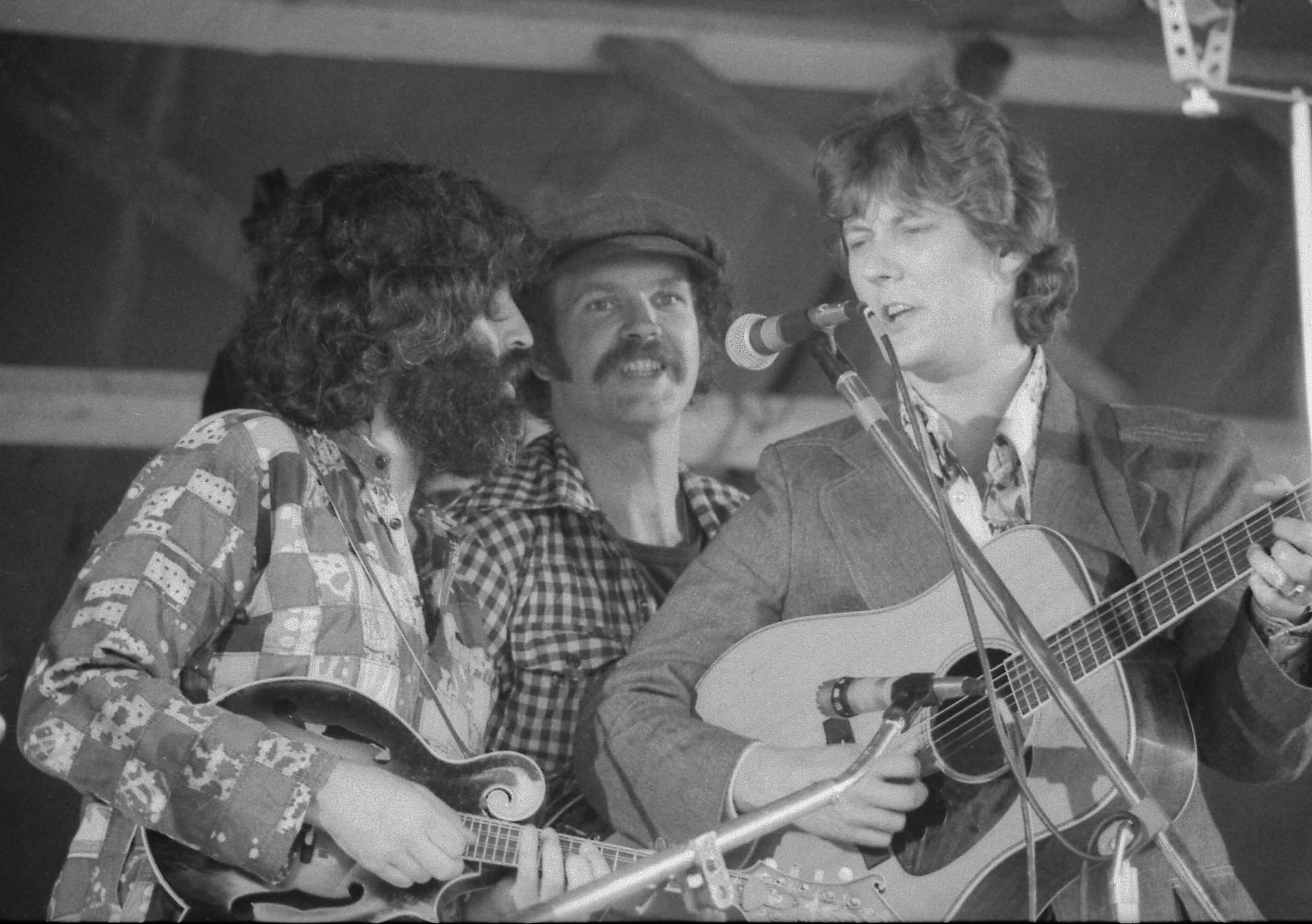
Tony Rice, acclaimed bluegrass guitarist (at R, with David Grisman, mandolin and Bill Keith, banjo) playing his much modified vintage 1935 Martin D-28, serial number 58957, formerly the property of Clarence White, in 1977

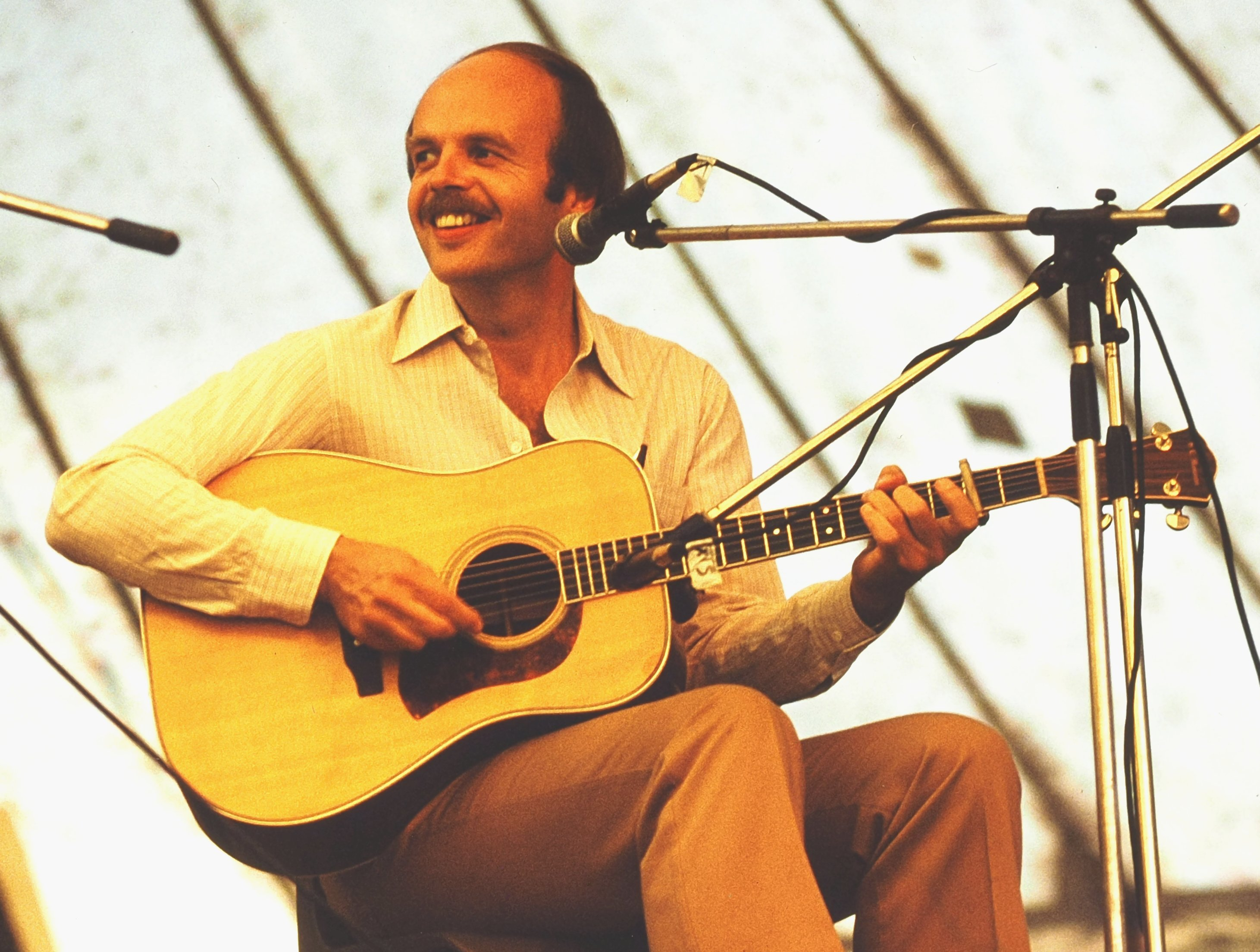
Dan Crary (bluegrass guitarist) at the 1981 Cambridge Folk Festival, UK with his Mossman dreadnought guitar

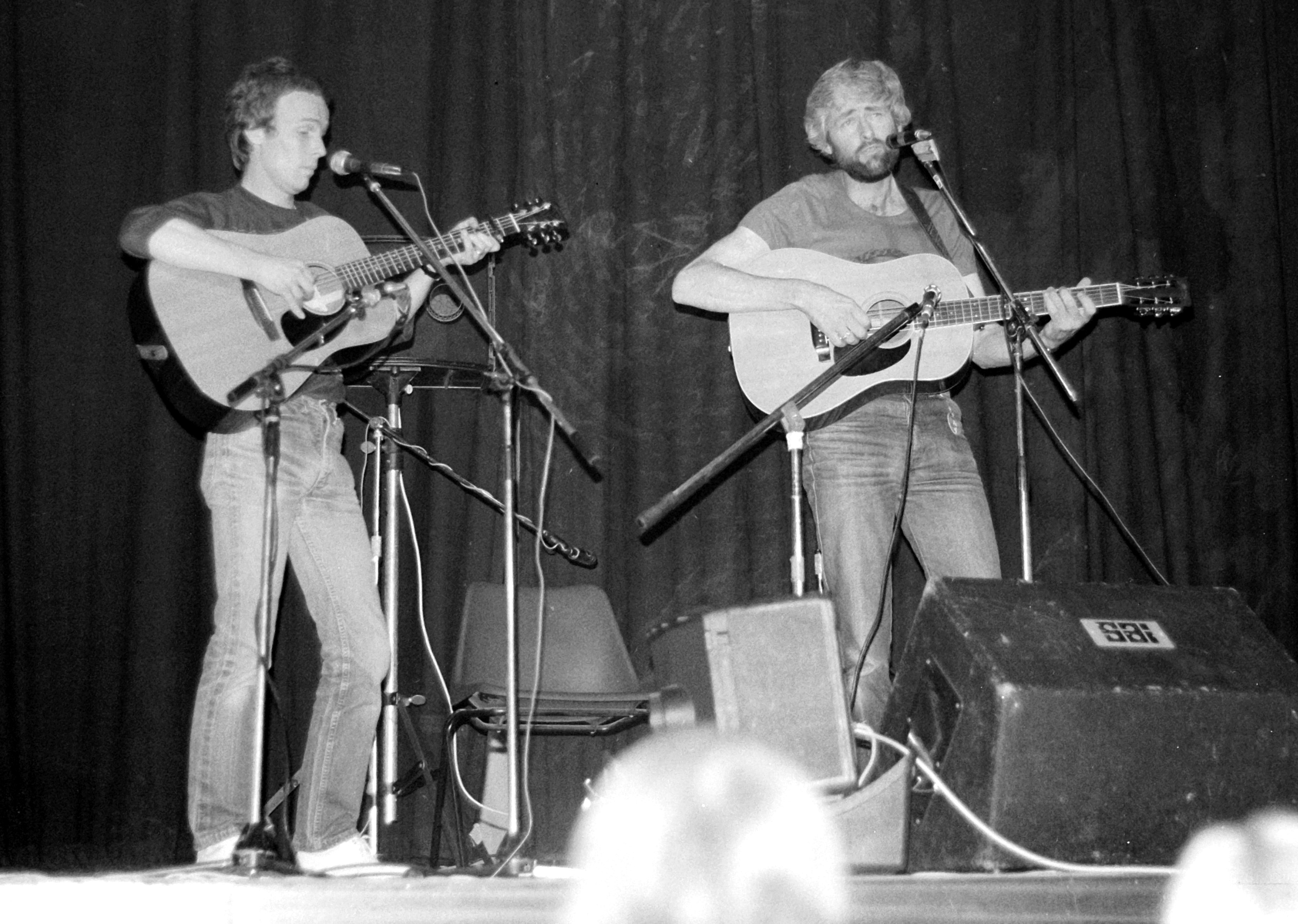
Allan Taylor and Paul Metsers (U.K. folk/acoustic performers), 1981: Taylor (left) with a Martin D-18, Metsers (right) with a Martin D-35S (12-fret/slotted head) model

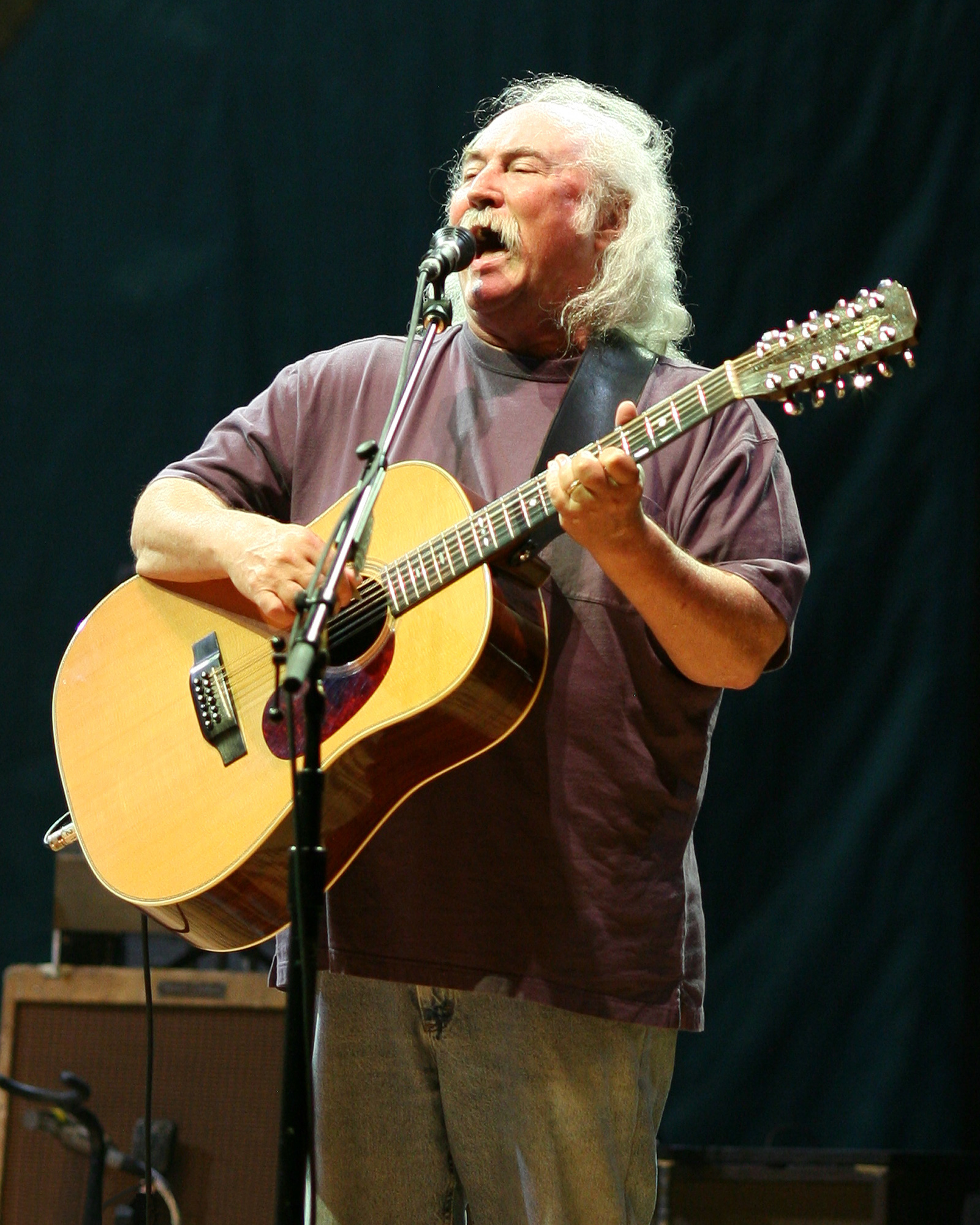
David Crosby, 2006, using a 12-string acoustic guitar patterned after its Martin equivalent (in this case, a 12-fret, round shouldered design)

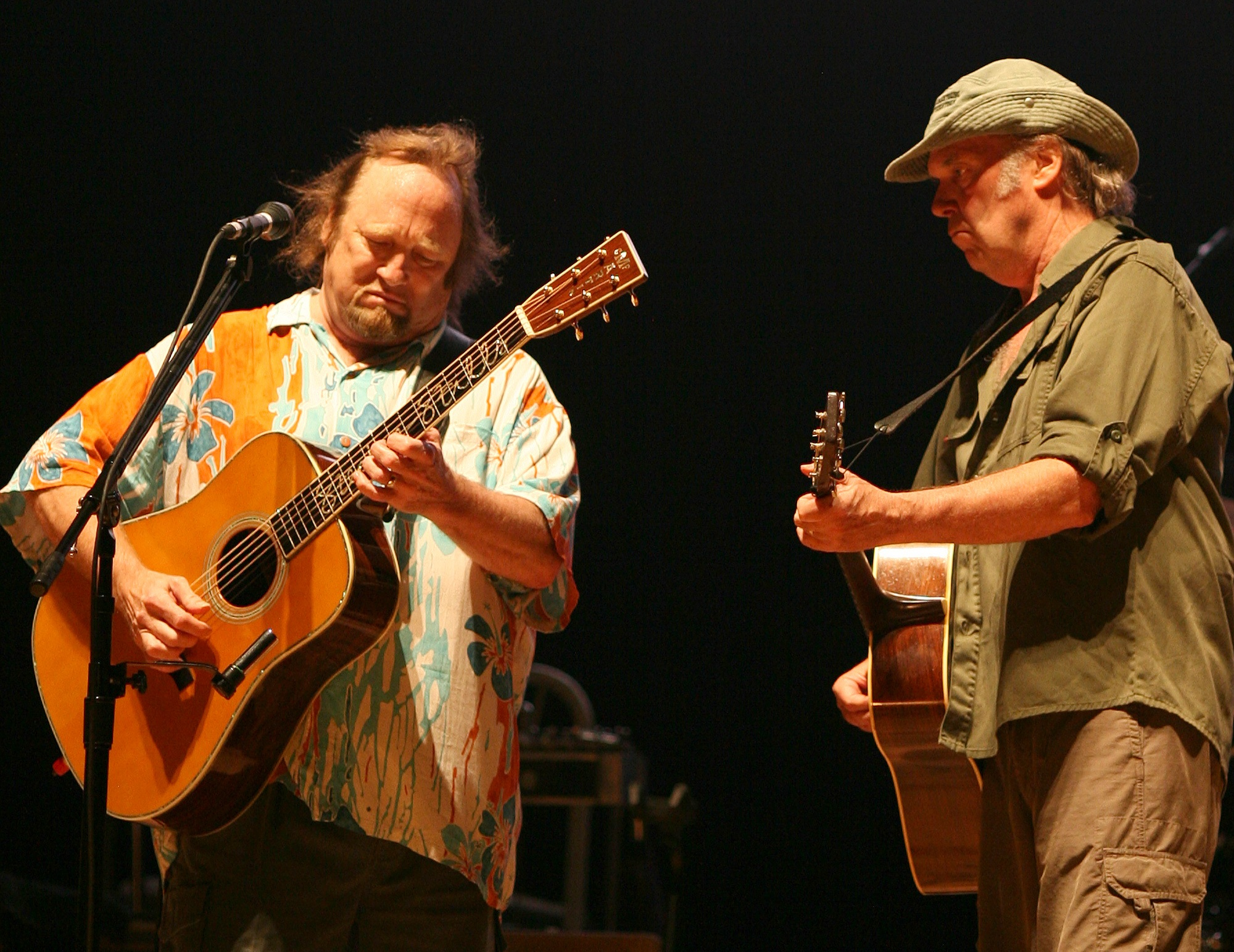
Stephen Stills (left) and Neil Young on stage in 2006, Stills with a personalized Martin D-45 model including his signature up the fingerboard

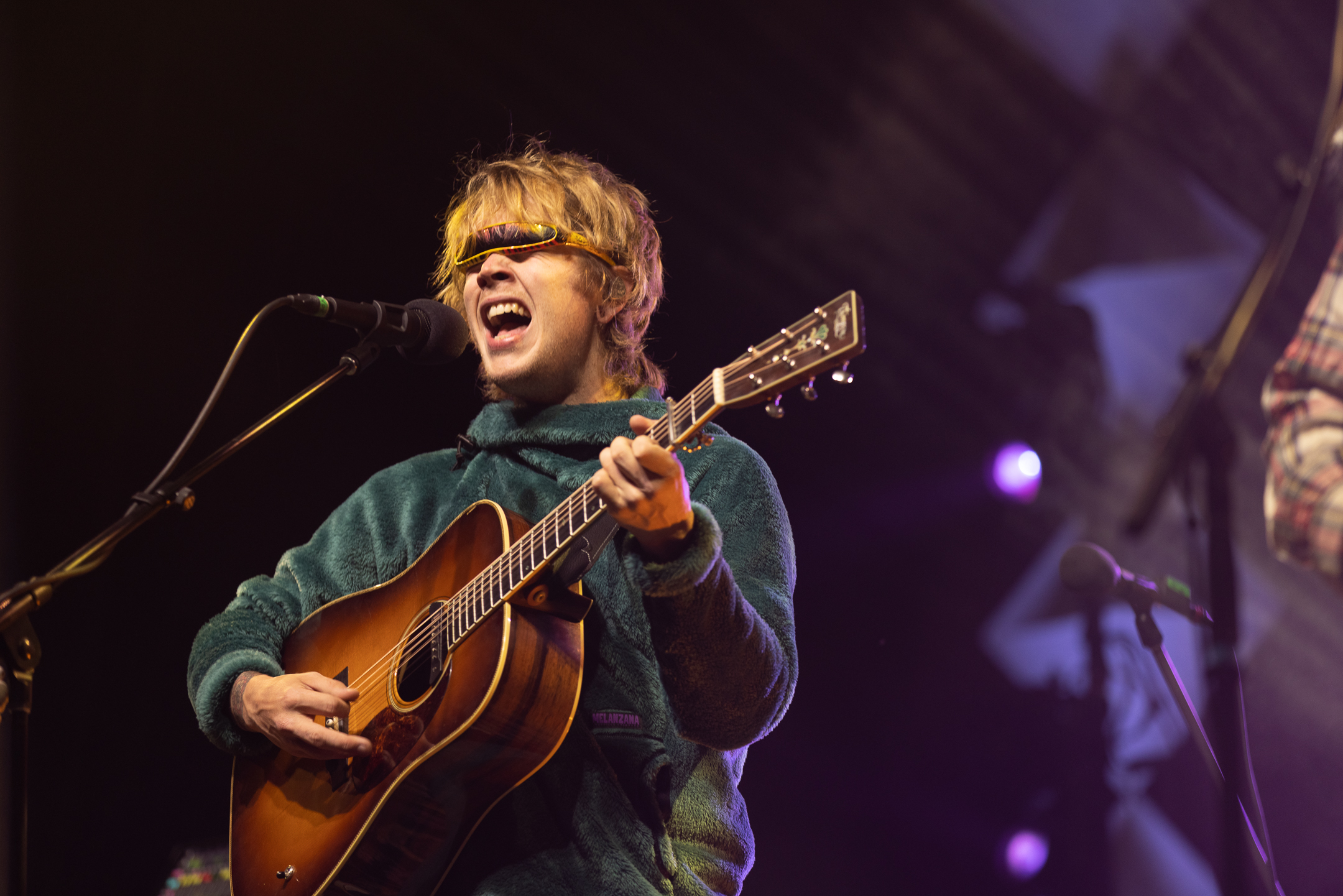
Billy Strings in 2021 with his signature Preston Thompson dreadnought guitar

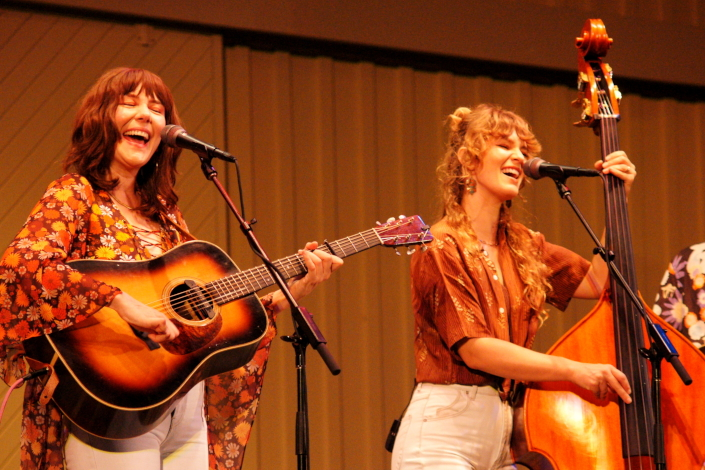
Molly Tuttle (with Shelby Means, double bass), 2022
