= Nickel Creek discography =

List of music by American progressive bluegrass band Nickel Creek

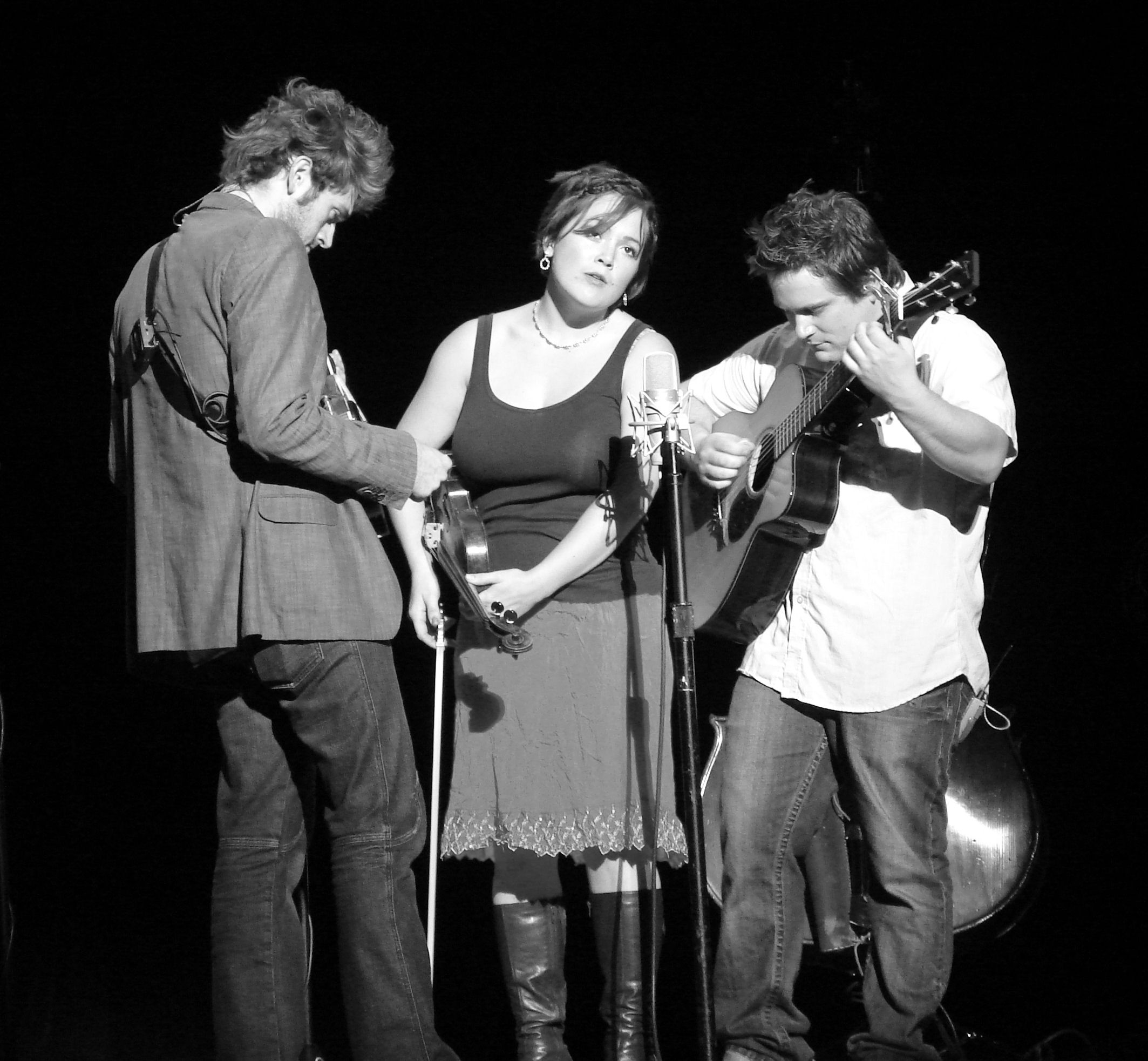
- Studio albums: 6
- Live albums: 1
- Compilation albums: 1
- Singles: 8
- Music videos: 8

This article represents the discography of progressive bluegrass band Nickel Creek. They have released six studio albums, one compilation album, as well as eight singles. Their debut live album was announced on October 2, 2020.

Nickel Creek's first widely known album, Nickel Creek, was released in 2001. It charted within the Top 20 of the Billboard Top Country Albums charts. The album featured three singles: "When You Come Back Down", "The Lighthouse's Tale", and "Reasons Why". The first two charted to number 48 and number 49 on the Billboard Hot Country Songs charts, whereas the third single failed to chart. Also in 2001, the band were featured with Dolly Parton on "Shine", a cover of the pop group Collective Soul's signature song. The song was released as a single from Parton's album Little Sparrow, and also featured a music video. Nickel Creek was then certified Gold by the Recording Industry Association of America on February 4, 2004.

In 2003, they released their critically acclaimed album This Side. It was a success on the Top Country Albums chart, debuting and peaking at number 2, as well as their first album to chart within the Top 20 of the Billboard 200, where it reached number 18. It was also a number-one album on the Billboard Top Bluegrass Albums chart. The album only spawned one chart single with its title track. It peaked at number 56 on the country charts.

Their fifth studio album, Why Should the Fire Die?, was released in 2005. Like its predecessor, it too, made the Top 20 of the Billboard 200, but failed to enter the Top Country Albums chart. One single was released, "When in Rome," but it failed to chart.

The band's sixth studio album, A Dotted Line, was released April 1, 2014.

Nickel Creek announced the release of their latest studio album, Celebrants, to be released on March 24, 2023. This album was recorded during the pandemic lockdown in February 2021. During the sessions, the band performed two live "Nickel Stream" concerts via Mandolin.

== Studio albums ==
=== 1990s ===
Title	Album details
Little Cowpoke	Release date: December 31, 1993; Label: Choo Choo Records; Formats: CD, cassette
Here to There	Release date: May 19, 1997; Label: self-released; Formats: CD, cassette

=== 2000s ===
Title	Album details	Peak chart positions					Certifications (sales thresholds)
Title	Album details	US Country	US	US Indie	US Bluegrass	UK Country.	Certifications (sales thresholds)
Nickel Creek	Release date: March 21, 2000; Label: Sugar Hill Records; Formats: CD, cassette	13	125	2	—	4	US: Platinum
This Side	Release date: August 13, 2002; Label: Sugar Hill Records; Formats: CD	2	18	1	1	5	US: Gold
Why Should the Fire Die?	Release date: August 9, 2005; Label: Sugar Hill Records; Formats: CD, music download	—	17	1	1	3	

=== 2010s–2020s ===
Title	Album details	Peak chart positions			
Title	Album details	US	US Grass	US Folk	UK Country.
A Dotted Line	Release date: April 1, 2014; Label: Nonesuch; Formats: CD, music download	7	1	1	
Celebrants	Release date: March 24, 2023; Label: Thirty Tigers	196	1	7	4

== Compilation albums ==
Title	Album details	Peak chart positions		
Title	Album details	US Country	US Indie	US Grass
Reasons Why: The Very Best	Release date: November 14, 2006; Label: Sugar Hill Records; Formats: CD, music download	41	17	1

== Live albums ==
Title	Album details
Live From The Fox Theater	Release date: February 12, 2021; Label: Bandcamp; Formats: Record/Vinyl + Digital

== Singles ==
Year	Single	Peak chart positions			Album
Year	Single	US Country	US AAA	UK	Album
2001	"When You Come Back Down"	48	—	—	Nickel Creek
2001	"The Lighthouse's Tale"	49	—	147	Nickel Creek
2002	"Reasons Why"	—	—	—	Nickel Creek
2002	"This Side"	56	—	—	This Side
2003	"Spit on a Stranger"	—	—	—	This Side
2003	"Speak"	—	—	—	This Side
2003	"Smoothie Song"	—	1	—	This Side
2005	"When in Rome"	—	7	—	Why Should the Fire Die?
2014	"Destination"	—	21	—	A Dotted Line
2023	"Strangers"	—	—	—	Celebrants
2023	"Holding Pattern"	—	—	—	Celebrants
2023	"Where the Long Line Leads"	—	—	—	Celebrants
"—" denotes releases that did not chart

=== Featured singles ===
Year	Single	Album
2001	"Shine" (Dolly Parton featuring Nickel Creek)	Little Sparrow

== Videography ==
=== Music videos ===
Year	Title	Director
2000	"Reasons Why"	Brent Hedgecock
2000	"When You Come Back Down"	Brent Hedgecock
2001	"The Lighthouse's Tale"	Brent Hedgecock
2002	"This Side"	Brent Hedgecock
2003	"Speak"	Sophie Muller
2003	"Smoothie Song"	Mark Reiter/Danny Clinch
2005	"When in Rome"	Dean Karr
2011	"Hayloft"	Steven Mertens
2014	"Destination"	Eli Cane

=== Guest appearances ===
Year	Title	Director
2001	"Shine" (with Dolly Parton)	Brent Hedgecock

== Collaborations ==
- Bug - original motion picture soundtrack (2007) Sean & Sara Watkins - track #2 "No Way to Live"
- Contributed mandolin and vocals to Circles (2006), a song on alternative/post-grunge band Switchfoot's album Oh! Gravity
- Those Were The Days (2005) with Dolly Parton, featured on a cover of Blowin' in the Wind
- Mutual Admiration Society (2004) with Glen Phillips
- Little Worlds (2003) with Béla Fleck and the Flecktones, featured on Off the Top (The Gravity Wheel) and Off the Top (Line Dance)
- Further Down The Old Plank Road (2003) with The Chieftains, featured on The Raggle Taggle Gypsy
- Little Sparrow (2001) with Dolly Parton, featured on the single "Shine"
