= Scotch & Chocolate =

Song by Nickel Creek

from the album Why Should the Fire Die?
- Released: August 2005
- Recorded: Barefoot Recording, Los Angeles, CA
- Genre: Progressive bluegrass
- Length: 3:07
- Label: Sugar Hill
- Songwriters: Chris Thile; Sara Watkins
- Producers: Eric Valentine; Tony Berg

"Scotch & Chocolate" is an instrumental song played by the modern bluegrass band Nickel Creek. It was the fourth song on Nickel Creek's album, Why Should the Fire Die?. In 2006, Scotch & Chocolate was nominated for a Grammy Award for Best Country Instrumental Performance.

== Personnel ==
- Chris Thile - Mandolin
- Sean Watkins - Guitar
- Sara Watkins - Fiddle
- Mark Schatz - Bass
