= Celebrants (album) =

Studio album by Nickel Creek
- Released: March 24, 2023
- Studio: RCA Studio A
- Genre: Progressive bluegrass
- Label: Thirty Tigers
- Producer: Eric Valentine

Nickel Creek chronology
A Dotted Line (2014)	Celebrants (2023)

Singles from Celebrants
- 1. "Strangers" Released: January 24, 2023; 2. "Holding Pattern" Released: February 16, 2023; 3. "Where The Long Line Leads" Released: March 9, 2023

Celebrants is the fifth major album release by progressive acoustic trio Nickel Creek released on 24 March 2023 via Thirty Tigers. It was nominated for the Grammy Award for Best Folk Album at the 66th Annual Grammy Awards.

== Background ==
After a tour supporting their 2014 album A Dotted Line, the band members focused attention on their various other projects. Chris Thile was the host of Live From Here until the show's conclusion in 2020 and continued to perform with Punch Brothers. Sean Watkins released a solo album and recorded with sister and fellow Nickel Creek member Sara Watkins as Watkins Family Hour. Sara also performed with I'm With Her and played fiddle on albums from Phoebe Bridgers and The Killers. The album process started in early 2021 when the group performed via livestreaming sessions and culminated with 4 weeks of recording in Nashville's RCA Studio A. It was released on 24 January 2023.

"This is a record about embracing the friction inherent in real human connection. We begin the record yearning for and pursuing harmonious connection. We end the record having realized that truly harmonious connection can only be achieved through the dissonance that we've spent our entire adult lives trying to avoid."

— Nickel Creek on the meaning of the album

== Promotion ==
Professional ratings
Review scores
Source	Rating
AllMusic	4/5 stars
Paste	8.6/10

Ahead of the announced release of the album, the band has scheduled a number of tour dates, including a 3-night block at the Ryman Auditorium in Nashville and appearances at the Railbird Festival and Telluride Bluegrass Festival.

== Track listing ==
All tracks written by Chris Thile, Sara Watkins, and Sean Watkins unless noted.

No.	Title	Length
1.	"Celebrants"	3:24
2.	"Strangers"	4:45
3.	"Water Under The Bridge, Part 1"	1:09
4.	"The Meadow"	3:30
5.	"Thinnest Wall"	3:08
6.	"Going Out..."	3:05
7.	"Holding Pattern"	3:06
8.	"Where The Long Line Leads"	3:25
9.	"Goddamned Saint"	4:44
10.	"Stone's Throw"	3:11
11.	"Goddamned Saint, Reprise"	0:52
12.	"From The Beach"	3:27
13.	"To The Airport"	4:03
14.	"...Despite The Weather"	4:03
15.	"Hollywood Ending"	4:17
16.	"New Blood"	3:40
17.	"Water Under The Bridge, Part 2"	1:05
18.	"Failure Isn't Forever"	5:01

== Personnel ==
=== Nickel Creek ===
- Chris Thile – mandolin, vocals
- Sean Watkins – guitar, vocals
- Sara Watkins – violin, guitar, vocals

=== Musicians ===
- Mike Elizondo – bass

=== Production ===
- Eric Valentine – producer, engineer

== Charts ==
Chart (2023)	Peak position
Scottish Albums (Official Charts)	98
UK Album Downloads (Official Charts)	72
UK Americana Albums (Official Charts)	5
UK Country Albums (Official Charts)	4
UK Independent Albums (Official Charts)	19
US Billboard 200	196
US Top Album Sales (Billboard)	18
US Top Bluegrass Albums (Billboard)	1
US Top Country Albums (Billboard)	23
US Americana/Folk Albums (Billboard)	7
