= Can't Complain (disambiguation) =

Can't Complain is a 2009 American film directed by Richard Johnson.

Can't Complain may also refer to:

- "Can't Complain", a song by Nickel Creek from the album Why Should the Fire Die?
- "Can't Complain", a song by Relient K from the album Collapsible Lung
