= Reasons Why: The Very Best =

Greatest hits album by Nickel Creek
- Released: November 13, 2006
- Recorded: 2000–2005
- Genre: Progressive bluegrass
- Length: 65:03
- Label: Sugar Hill
- Producer: Alison Krauss; Tony Berg; Eric Valentine

Nickel Creek chronology
Why Should the Fire Die? (2005)	Reasons Why: The Very Best (2006)	A Dotted Line (2014)

Professional ratings
Review scores
Source	Rating
Allmusic	4/5 stars

Reasons Why: The Very Best is a compilation album by the band Nickel Creek, released on Sugar Hill in late 2006. It is the band's fourth album. As of June 20, 2007, the band has sold approximately 60,000 copies of the compilation.

This album is a greatest hits album. Included with the CD is a DVD of all of their music videos to date.

== Track listing ==
1. "The Lighthouse's Tale" (Adam McKenzie, Chris Thile) – 5:00
2. "Out of the Woods" (Sinéad Lohan) – 5:20
3. "When in Rome" (Thile) – 4:15
4. "Helena" (Thile) – 4:40
5. "Smoothie Song" (Thile) – 3:19
6. "Somebody More Like You" (Sean Watkins) – 2:58
7. "Reasons Why" (Watkins, David Puckett) – 4:08
8. "Can't Complain" (Thile) – 5:31
9. "I Should've Known Better" (Carrie Newcomer) – 4:26
10. "This Side" (Watkins) – 3:34
11. "Jealous of the Moon" (Thile, Gary Louris) – 4:40
12. "When You Come Back Down" (Tim O'Brien, Danny O'Keefe) – 3:52
13. "You Don't Have To Move That Mountain" (Live from The Freight and Salvage, November 16, 2000) (Keith Whitley) – 3:51
14. "The Fox" (Live from The Freight and Salvage, November 16, 2000) (traditional, arranged by Nickel Creek) – 9:19

Bonus DVD

1. "When You Come Back Down"
2. "The Lighthouse's Tale"
3. "Reasons Why"
4. "This Side"
5. "Speak"
6. "Smoothie Song"
7. "When in Rome"

== Chart positions ==
Chart (2006)	Peak position	Sales/ shipments
U.S. Billboard Top Country Albums	41	46,718
U.S. Billboard Top Independent Albums	17	46,718
U.S. Billboard Top Bluegrass Albums	1	46,718

== Personnel ==
=== Musical ===
- Chris Thile – Mandolin, Vocals, Among others
- Sean Watkins – Guitar, Vocals, Among others
- Sara Watkins – Fiddle, Vocals
- Scott Thile, Mark Schatz, Byron House, Edgar Meyer – Basses

=== Technical ===
- Eric Conn – Compilation Mastering
- Ken Edwards "Easy Ed" – Engineer
- Arthur Gorson – Photography
- Sue Meyer – Design
- Terry Teachout – Liner Notes
