= Sara Watkins (album) =

Studio album by Sara Watkins
- Released: April 7, 2009
- Recorded: February 2008–2009
- Studios: Sound Emporium (Nashville, Tennessee); Henson Recording (Los Angeles, California)
- Genres: Bluegrass, folk, country
- Label: Nonesuch
- Producer: John Paul Jones

Sara Watkins chronology
Sara Watkins (2009)	Sun Midnight Sun (2012)

Professional ratings
Review scores
Source	Rating
About.com Country Music	4.5/5 stars

Sara Watkins is the debut solo album by Sara Watkins. It was released by Nonesuch Records on April 7, 2009. The album reached No. 13 on the Heatseekers Albums chart at Billboard magazine.

== Track listing ==
No.	Title	Writer(s)	Length
1.	"All This Time"	Sara Watkins	3:18
2.	"Long Hot Summer Days"	John Hartford	4:46
3.	"My Friend"	Watkins	3:16
4.	"Freiderick"	Watkins	3:06
5.	"Same Mistakes"	Jon Brion	3:10
6.	"Any Old Time"	Jimmie Rodgers	3:58
7.	"Pony"	Tom Waits	5:30
8.	"Lord Won't You Help Me"	Norman Blake	3:00
9.	"Jefferson"	Watkins	3:01
10.	"Give Me Jesus"	Watkins	3:14
11.	"Bygones"	Watkins	2:42
12.	"Too Much"	Davíd Garza	3:26
13.	"Will We Go"	Watkins	3:28
14.	"Where Will You Be"	Watkins	3:42

== Personnel ==
=== Musicians ===
- Sara Watkins, vocals (1–8, 10–14), fiddle (2, 5, 6, 9–13), ukulele (7)
- Sean Watkins, guitar (1–3, 5, 6, 8, 9, 12, 13), harmony vocals (1, 5, 8), acoustic guitar (14)
- John Paul Jones, harmony vocals (1), bass (7, 8, 12–14), organ (11), electric piano (13), mandolin (13), piano (14)
- Jon Brion, guitar (6, 7), electric guitar (12, 14)
- Chris Eldridge, guitar (4), second guitar (7), harmony vocals (13)
- Greg Leisz, pedal steel guitar (1, 5–7)
- David Rawlings, drums (2), electric guitar (8), harmony vocals (8)
- Gillian Welch, electric guitar (2, 8), harmony vocals (8)
- Billy Cardine, dobro (2)
- Michael Witcher, dobro (3)
- Ronnie McCoury, mandolin (4, 9)
- Chris Thile, mandola (10)
- Byron House, bass (2)
- Mark Schatz, bass (3, 9)
- Sebastian Steinberg, bass (1, 5, 6)
- Rayna Gellert, fiddle (2, 11)
- Benmont Tench, piano (1, 5, 12)
- Pete Thomas, drums (1, 5, 6, 12, 14)
- Luke Bulla, harmony vocals (10, 13)
- Claire Lynch, harmony vocals (11)
- Jenny Anne Mannan, harmony vocals (10)
- Tim O’Brien, harmony vocals (2, 6)
- Aoife O'Donovan, harmony vocals (11, 12)

=== Production and design ===
- John Paul Jones, production
- Dave Sinko, recording, mixing
- Eric Conn, mastering
- Jeremy Cowart, photography
- Wendy Stamberger, design
