= Best of Luck =

Best of Luck may refer to:

- Best of Luck (2010 film), a Malayalam-language black comedy film
- Best of Luck (2013 film), a Punjabi film
- "Best of Luck", a song by Nickel Creek, from the album Why Should the Fire Die?
