= Blinders On =

Studio album by Sean Watkins
- Released: November 17, 2005
- Genres: Indie folk, acoustic
- Length: 47:22
- Label: Sugar Hill
- Producer: Sean Watkins

Sean Watkins chronology
26 Miles (2004)	Blinders On (2005)

Professional ratings
Review scores
Source	Rating
AllMusic	link
Pop Matters	link
Prefix Magazine	link
The Washington Post	link

Blinders On is a 2005 solo album by Sean Watkins. It was released for digital download on November 17, 2005. It was physically released in the United States on March 14, 2006, and released in the United Kingdom on March 20, 2006. Blinders On is Watkins' third solo album, and his first in three years. The album is not considered bluegrass at all, one critic saying that Blinders On is "pure California road pop".

== Track listing ==
1. Summer's Coming - 3:32
2. Starve Them To Death - 2:47
3. I'm Sorry (Watkins, Wilson) - 4:01
4. Happy New Year - 4:08
5. Hello...Goodbye - 1:11
6. Run Away Girl (Watkins, Wilson) - 3:49
7. I Say Nothing - 4:00
8. Coffee - 3:03
9. The Sound Of My Crush - :50
10. No Lighted Windows - 2:19
11. Cammac - :20
12. Roses Never Red - 2:51
13. They Sail Away (Frizell, Watkins) - 3:06
14. Not That Bad/Blinders On - 4:14
15. Whipping Boy/Cherokee Shuffle (Hidden Track) - 7:11 (Whipping Boy ends at 2:32 and the hidden track begins at 3:05)

All songs by Sean Watkins, except where noted.

== Personnel ==
=== Musical ===
- Sean Watkins - Lead Vocals, Guitars, Organ, Synthesizer, Bass, Mandolin, Piano, Keyboards, Sampling, Harmony Vocals, Drum Machine, Art Direction, Mixing, Drum Loop
- Sara Watkins - Violin, Harmony Vocals
- Gabe Witcher - Fiddle
- Benmont Tench - Piano, Toy Xylophone, Wurlitzer, Harmonium, Hammond organ
- Glenn Kotche - Drums, Vibes
- Jon Foreman - Harmony Vocals
- Rushad Eggleston - Cello
- Peter Sprague - Engineer, Mixing
- Byron House - Bass (Pizzicato)
- Jon Brion - Piano
- Mark Schatz - Bass
- Judith Ablon - Viola
- Zeneba Bowers - Violin
- Matthew Walker - Cello
- Duncan Moore - Drums

=== Technical ===
- Loren Witcher - Cover Art, Illustrations
- Ricky Chao - Assistant Engineer
- Autumn de Wilde - Photography
- Wendy Stamberger - Art Direction, Design
- Scott Fritz - Engineer, Mixing
- Ray Kennedy - Mastering
- Glenn Pittman - Assistant Engineer
- Vanessa Price - Grooming

== Public reception ==
The album was well received by fans, although Blinders On did not chart on any of the Billboard listings. It was released by compact disc and also via digital download on Watkins's website (where it remains available for digital download).
