= Mutual Admiration Society (band) =

Musical collaboration between Glen Phillips and Nickel Creek

- Origin: United States
- Genres: Rock, Country, Bluegrass
- Years active: 2000–present
- Members: Glen Phillips; Chris Thile; Sara Watkins; Sean Watkins

Mutual Admiration Society is a musical collaboration between singer/songwriter Glen Phillips and progressive bluegrass trio Nickel Creek.

== History ==
The members of Nickel Creek were fans of Glen's band Toad the Wet Sprocket and a chance encounter with a friend of Glen's backstage at a festival led to Nickel Creek guitarist Sean Watkins emailing Glen and Glen agreeing to sing the title song on Sean's debut solo album Let It Fall. Glen invited the band to perform with him at the Los Angeles nightclub Largo and they quickly became strong admirers of each other's music, leading to the name of the group. They got together in Glen's home studio in December 2000 and recorded the album in 3 days, though it took 3 1/2 years before it was finally released. Glen and Nickel Creek participated in a joint "Mutual Admiration Tour" in the fall of 2001, when they had initially expected the album to be released. When the album was finally released in the summer of 2004, another tour ensued, which included the services of Led Zeppelin bassist John Paul Jones and drummer Pete Thomas from Elvis Costello and the Attractions. Pete Thomas, Sara Watkins, Sean Watkins, and Glen Phillips along with Luke Bulla and others began recording as Works Progress Administration in September 2007.

== Discography ==
- Mutual Admiration Society (2004) Recorded in 2000
- Mutual Admiration Society Solo Sampler (2004)

The Solo Sampler included recordings by Chris Thile, Sean Watkins, Glen Phillips, and John Paul Jones.

In the summer of 2007, Glen Phillips was invited to perform as the opening act for the first leg of Nickel Creek's "Farewell (For Now)" tour, which included dates in the midwest. It was common for members of Nickel Creek to perform with Glen Phillips during his set and vice versa. Selections from the Mutual Admiration Society recording were performed during this collaboration.
