= Sun Midnight Sun =

Studio album by Sara Watkins
- Released: May 8, 2012
- Studio: Zeitgeist Studios, Los Angeles, California
- Genre: Bluegrass, folk
- Label: Nonesuch
- Producer: Blake Mills

Sara Watkins chronology
Sara Watkins (2009)	Sun Midnight Sun (2012)	Young in All the Wrong Ways (2016)

Professional ratings
Aggregate scores
Source	Rating
Metacritic	76/100
Review scores
Source	Rating
Allmusic	4/5 stars
The Telegraph	3.5/5 stars
The Wrap	Favorable
American Songwriter	3/5 stars

Sun Midnight Sun is the second solo album by American singer and fiddle player Sara Watkins. It was released on May 8, 2012, by Nonesuch Records. It reached No. 11 on the Billboard Folk Chart and No. 16 on the Heatseekers chart.

== Track listing ==
1. "The Foothills" (Sara Watkins, Blake Mills) – 1:22
2. "You and Me" (Sara Watkins) – 3:23
3. "You're the One I Love" (feat. Fiona Apple) (Felice and Boudleaux Bryant) – 1:45
4. "When It Pleases You" (Dan Wilson) – 6:50
5. "Be There" (Watkins, Mills) – 3:50
6. "I'm a Memory" (Willie Nelson, arr. Mills) – 3:56
7. "Impossible" (Sara Watkins, Sean Watkins, Blake Mills) – 3:54
8. "The Ward Accord" (Sara Watkins, Mills) – 3:21
9. "Lock & Key" (Sara Watkins, Jenny Mannan, Mills) – 3:39
10. "Take Up Your Spade" (Sara Watkins) – 3:26

== Chart performance ==
Chart	Peak position
U.S. Billboard Folk	11
U.S. Billboard Top Heatseekers	17

== Personnel ==
- Sara Watkins – lead vocals, fiddle, guitar
- Sean Watkins – harmony vocals, guitar
- Blake Mills – harmony vocals, other instruments

== Production ==
- Blake Mills – producer
- Shawn Everett – recording, mixing, mastering
- Jeri Helden – design
- Aaron Redfield – photography
