= Nickel Creek (album) =

Studio album by Nickel Creek
- Released: March 21, 2000
- Recorded: 1999
- Genre: Progressive bluegrass
- Length: 49:34
- Label: Sugar Hill
- Producer: Alison Krauss

Nickel Creek chronology
Here to There (1997)	Nickel Creek (2000)	This Side (2002)

Singles from Nickel Creek
- 1. "When You Come Back Down"; 2. "The Lighthouse's Tale"; 3. "Reasons Why"

Original album release cover

Professional ratings
Review scores
Source	Rating
Allmusic	4.5/5 stars

Nickel Creek is an album by the acoustic/newgrass trio Nickel Creek. The group had released two albums prior to this; however, their earlier albums are no longer in print, and the band redefined their style before the release of Nickel Creek. It was released by Sugar Hill Records, and produced by bluegrass star Alison Krauss.

== Track listing ==
#	Title	Songwriter(s)	Length
1	"Ode to a Butterfly"	Chris Thile	4:10
2	"The Lighthouse's Tale"	Adam McKenzie, Chris Thile	5:03
3	"Out of the Woods"	Sinéad Lohan	5:19
4	"House of Tom Bombadil"	Chris Thile	3:46
5	"Reasons Why"	Sean Watkins, David Puckett	4:08
6	"When You Come Back Down"	Tim O'Brien, Danny O'Keefe	3:49
7	"Sweet Afton"	Robert Burns, Chris Thile	5:37
8	"Cuckoo's Nest"	Traditional	2:19
9	"The Hand Song"	Sean Watkins, David Puckett	4:26
10	"Robin and Marian"	Sean Watkins	4:34
11	"The Fox"	Traditional, arranged by Nickel Creek	2:30
12	"Pastures New"	Sean Watkins	3:53

== Original album cover ==
The album was originally released with a different cover photo which featured fourth band member Scott Thile. He was also mentioned more extensively in the album credits. Upon his departure from the band, the album was reprinted with a new photo which featured the remaining three members of the band, and Scott's credits were lessened slightly to simply indicate his performance on the individual songs.

Other than photography and booking credits, the track listings, performances, and all other credits are identical on both releases.

== Charts and Certifications ==
=== Weekly charts ===
Chart (2000–02)	Peak position
US Billboard 200	125
US Top Country Albums (Billboard)	13
US Top Heatseekers Albums (Billboard)	2
US Independent Albums (Billboard)	2
UK Country Albums (OCC)	4

=== Year-end charts ===
Chart (2002)	Position
US Top Country Albums (Billboard)	50

=== Certifications ===
Country	Certification	Sales/ shipments
US	Platinum	1,002,733

== Personnel ==
- Chris Thile - mandolin, banjo, bouzouki, lead and harmony vocals
- Sara Watkins - fiddle, strings, violin, lead and harmony vocals
- Sean Watkins - guitar, mandolin, lead and harmony vocals
- Scott Thile - electric and acoustic bass guitars, upright bass

== Production ==
- Producer: Alison Krauss
- Recorded at Seventeen Grand and The Brown Cloud
- Mixed at the Doghouse
- Engineer: Gary Paczosa
- Assistant engineers: Bobby Morse, Sandy Jenkins, Thomas Johnson
- Mastering: Doug Sax
- Digital editing: Chuck Turner
- Photography: Jim McGuire (original release), Brent Hedgecock (re-release)
- Design: Sue Meyer
- Booking: Andrea Compton (original release), William Morris Agency (re-release)
