= Sinéad Lohan =

Irish singer and songwriter (born 1971)

- Born: 1971 (age 54–55); Cork, Ireland
- Genres: Folk, country
- Instruments: Vocals, guitar
- Years active: 1991–present

Sinéad Lohan (born 1971) is an Irish singer and songwriter. A native of Cork, her song "Sailing By" appeared on the compilation A Woman's Heart 2.

== Music career ==
In 1991 Lohan began playing regular gigs at The Lobby, a music venue in Cork, and soon thereafter began recording her first album, Who Do You Think I Am, produced by Declan Sinnott. She has released two albums, Who Do You Think I Am in 1995, which scored several radio hits in Ireland, and No Mermaid in 1998, which has been rated 4/5 stars at AllMusic. No Mermaid was released by Interscope Records after a bidding war between several major labels. In 1997, she toured as support to The Blue Nile. In 1998, she performed with Lilith Fair for three dates.

Her music has been described as having a "folky feel" and her persona "by turns reflective, poetic and wistful." She was one of the "most commercially successful artists" in Ireland in the 1990s. Her lyrics have been inspired by Shakespeare and Lewis Carroll and have "intense, colorful imagery" while her stage performance at a concert in Los Angeles was described as "confident and luminous on stage, but not quite commanding." The song "No Mermaid" was used in the movie Message in a Bottle. Lohan did a tour of Ireland with Joan Baez who later recorded Lohan's songs "No Mermaid" and "Who Do You Think I Am". The Canadian group Shaye recorded "No Mermaid" on their album The Bridge. The progressive bluegrass band Nickel Creek covered her song "Out of the Woods" (also from the album No Mermaid) on their Nickel Creek album (2000). The song "What Can Never Be" was used in an episode of Dawson's Creek called "Northern Lights".

In October 1999, her song "Everything Around Me Is Changing" appeared on the soundtrack for the film Anywhere But Here. In 2004, Lohan began work on her third album with Malcolm Burn, the producer of No Mermaid; by 2007, the work was complete. However, the album was never released.

Throughout most of her career, Lohan wore her hair in colorful cornrows, which took six hours to braid.

== Personal life ==
With her partner, John, Lohan gave birth to a son in March 1999, after touring through her eighth month. She gave birth to her second child, a daughter, in January 2001.

== Discography ==
=== Albums ===
==== Studio albums ====
Title	Album details	Peak chart positions
Title	Album details	IRE
Who Do You Think I Am	Released: 1995; Label: Dara; Formats: LP, CD, cassette	8
No Mermaid	Released: 1998; Label: Interscope; Formats: CD, cassette	?
"—" denotes items which were not released in that country or failed to chart.

=== Singles ===
- "Bee in the Bottle" (1995)
- "If I Go" (1995)
- "To Ramona" (1996, IRE No. 9)
- "Whatever It Takes" (1998, IRE No. 16)
- "No Mermaid" (1998)
- "Whether or Not" (2000)
