= 26 Miles =

Studio album by Sean Watkins
- Released: April 8, 2003
- Genre: Progressive bluegrass
- Label: Sugar Hill

Sean Watkins chronology
Let It Fall (2001)	26 Miles (2003)	Blinders On (2006)

Professional ratings
Review scores
Source	Rating
Allmusic	4.5/5 stars
Bullz-Eye	3.5/5 stars
Daily Vault	A
PopMatters	positive
Roots Music Report	5/5 stars

26 Miles is the second solo album by Sean Watkins. It was released on April 8, 2003.

== Track listing ==
All tracks are written by Sean Watkins.

No.	Title	Length
1.	"On Ice"	2:29
2.	"Chicago"	2:26
3.	"Letters Never Sent"	2:50
4.	"N.M.I."	5:07
5.	"Hiding"	2:20
6.	"Through The Spring"	3:04
7.	"Chutes & Ladders"	5:43
8.	"Take It Away"	2:24
9.	"Locking Doors"	3:05
10.	"26 Miles"	4:06
11.	"Creeping Beauty"	2:07
12.	"Brick Window"	2:45
13.	"Carousel"	5:16

== Personnel ==
=== Musical ===
- Sean Watkins – Guitar, Piano, Guitar (Electric), Guitar (Rhythm), Vocals, Producer, Engineer, Harmony Vocals, E-Bow, Sequencing, Drum Samples
- Sara Watkins – Fiddle, Vocals
- Jon Brion – Organ, Guitar, Hammond organ, Chamberlin, Piano (Upright)
- Dave Curtis – Bass
- Kevin Hennessy – Bass
- Bob Magnuson – Bass
- Duncan Moore – drums, Loops
- Alex Palamidis – Violin
- Glen Phillips – Harmony Vocals
- Tripp Sprague – Saxophone
- John Stubbs – Violin

=== Technical ===
- Dan Abernathy – Engineer
- Doug Sax – Mastering
- Peter Sprague – Engineer
- Wendy Stamberger – Art Direction, Design
- Brent Hedgecock – Photography
