= Works Progress Administration (band) =

American supergroup led by Sean Watkins, Glen Phillips, and Luke Bulla

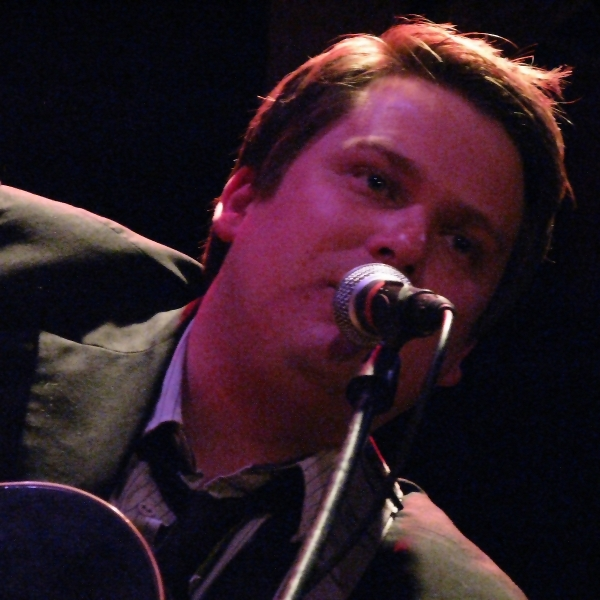

Background information
- Origin: Los Angeles, U.S.
- Years active: 2007–present
- Label: None
- Members: Sean Watkins; Glen Phillips; Luke Bulla; Benmont Tench; Sara Watkins; Greg Leisz; Pete Thomas; Davey Faragher
- Website: www.wpamusic.com

Works Progress Administration, formerly known by the working name The Scrolls, is an American supergroup led by Sean Watkins, Glen Phillips, and Luke Bulla. They recorded their debut album with Benmont Tench (piano), Sara Watkins (fiddle), Greg Leisz (various instruments), Pete Thomas (drums), and Davey Faragher (bass). These members gained recognition in other musical projects such as Nickel Creek, Tom Petty & the Heartbreakers, Elvis Costello and the Imposters, Fiction Family, and Toad the Wet Sprocket.

The project started in September 2007, when W.P.A began to record songs for an upcoming album release. In Sara Watkins' December 2007 MySpace blog, she said "we're hoping to nearly (finish) the record in the next few days. We're tracking live and trying to get as much down at one time as possible. It is a very satisfying way to record".

Their self-titled release debuted on August 28, 2009. Some of the tracks from the self-titled debut include the Phillips-penned tracks "Rise Up", "You Will Always Have My Love", and "End This Now", as well as a Luke Bulla/Glen Phillips collaboration entitled "Cry For You". "Not Sure", one of three Sean Watkins track that is featured, was originally released on the Fiction Family album. The Works Progress Administration version features Luke Bulla giving a rich voice to the melody as well as the fuller orchestration.

== Discography ==
WPA

Released August 28, 2009

1. "Always Have My Love" – 4:12 (G. Phillips)
2. "Good As Ever" – 3:08 (Phillips)
3. "Cry For You" – 4:02 (L. Bulla and G. Phillips)
4. "Rise Up" – 4:05 (Phillips)
5. "Paralyzed" – 2:29 (Sean Watkins)
6. "Remember Well" – 4:55 (L. Bulla)
7. "End This Now" – 3:08 (Phillips)
8. "Already Gone" – 3:48 (Watkins)
9. "I Go To Sleep" – 3:16 (Ray Davies)
10. "Not Sure" – 3:07 (Watkins)
11. "A Wedding or a Wake" – 2:24 (Phillips)
12. "The Price" – 4:23 (B. Tench)

4X4

Released March 5, 2011

1. "Solar Flare" – 4:13 (Phillips)
2. "Don't Say You Love Me" – 3:22 (Watkins)
3. "It's Over Now" – 2:47 (Phillips)
4. "Wild Side" – 2:40 (Watkins)
