= Mark Schatz =

American musician and record producer (born 1955)

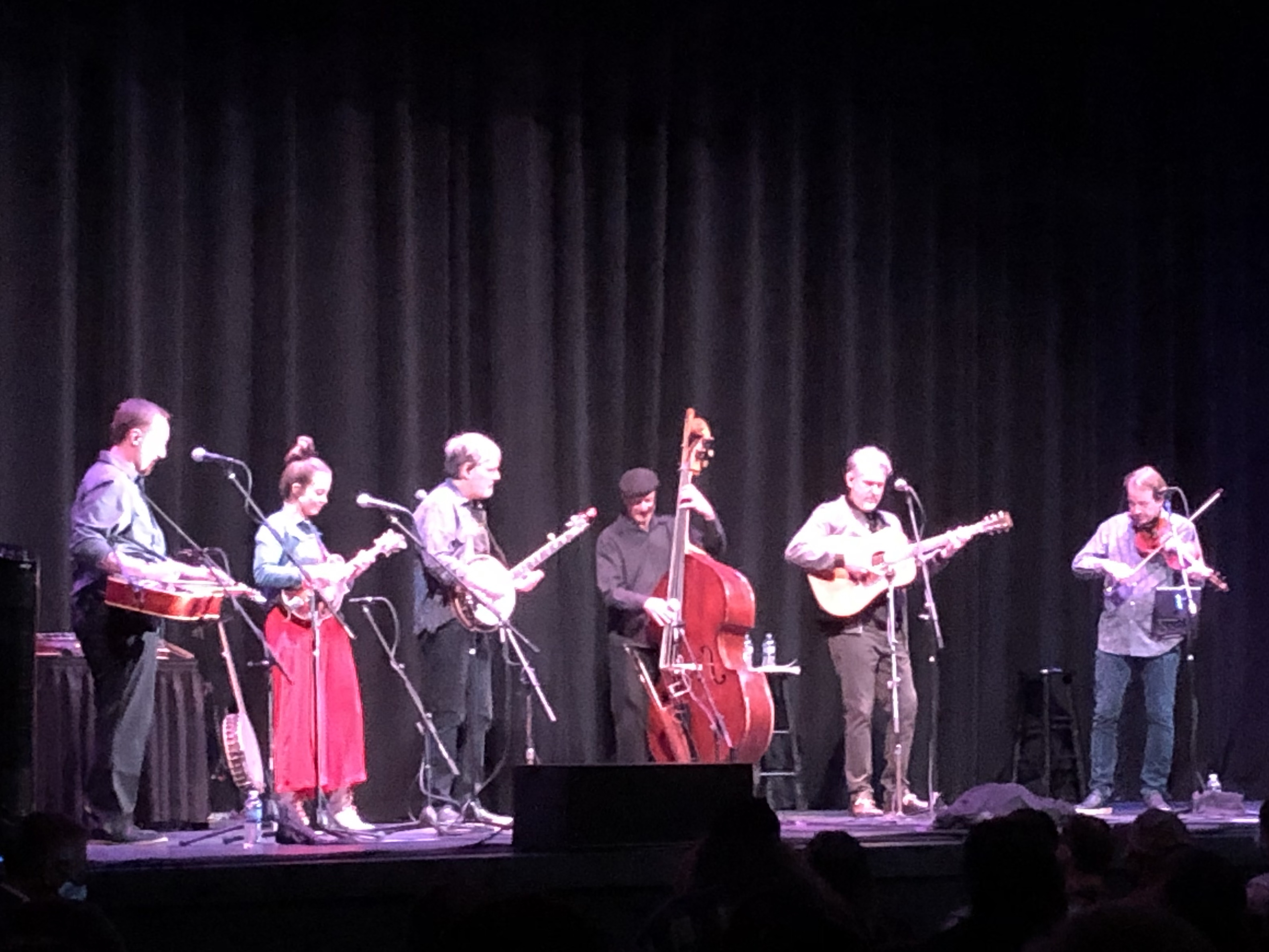
- Schatz (third from right) playing bass in 2022, in support of Bela Fleck’s album My Bluegrass Heart

Background information
- Born: Mark L. Schatz; April 23, 1955 (age 71); Philadelphia, Pennsylvania
- Genres: Bluegrass, Old-time
- Instruments: Bass, banjo, mandolin, guitar
- Label: Rounder
- Website: www.markschatz.net

Mark L. Schatz (born April 23, 1955) is an American bassist, banjoist, mandolinist, guitarist, clogger, and hambone performer who has recorded on albums for and toured with artists including Bela Fleck, Nickel Creek, Jerry Douglas, Maura O'Connell, Tony Rice, John Hartford, Emmylou Harris, Linda Ronstadt, Tim O'Brien, and Renée Fleming.

== Background ==
Schatz was born into a musical family in Philadelphia, Pennsylvania and grew up in Lexington, Massachusetts, near Boston.

From 1973 to 1978 he studied music theory and composition at Haverford College, after which he studied for a year at the Berklee College of Music in Boston. He relocated to Nashville, Tennessee in 1983.

== Career ==
Mark Schatz is a two time International Bluegrass Music Association Bass Player of the Year award winner. Schatz toured and recorded with progressive acoustic trio Nickel Creek. Schatz is also a solo artist who has recorded two solo albums on Rounder Records, his debut produced by Bela Fleck. His band, "Mark Schatz & Friends," is composed of Schatz, Casey Driessen, Missy Raines, and Jim Hurst. Schatz has produced albums for various bluegrass artists including The Duhks, and has recorded with Nefesh Mountain.

== Discography ==
=== Solo ===
- 1995: Brand New Old Tyme Way
- 2006: Steppin' in the Boilerhouse

=== With Danny Knicely and Wyatt Rice ===
- 2014: Waltz for Aimee

=== With Bryan McDowell ===
- 2021: Grit & Polish

=== With Rudi Ekstein's All Original Bluegrass Instrumental Showcase, Stuart Duncan, and Jeff Autry ===
- 2018: Carolina Chimes

=== With Tim O’Brien and The O’Boys ===
- 1993: Oh Boy! O'Boy!
- 1995: Rock In My Shoe

=== With The Claire Lynch Band ===
- 2014: Holiday!

=== With Spectrum ===
- 1980: Opening Roll
- 1981: Last Concert (Live In Japan)
- 1982: It's Too Hot For Words

=== With Nickel Creek ===
- 2005: Why Should the Fire Die?
- 2006: Reasons Why: The Very Best
- 2014: A Dotted Line

=== With Tasty Licks ===
- 1978: Tasty Licks
- 1979: Anchored To The Shore

=== With The Bluegrass Album Band ===
- 1989: Sweet Sunny South - The Bluegrass Album Band Volume 5

=== With The Hartford String Band ===
- 1999: Good Old Boys (with John Hartford)

=== With The John Hartford String Band ===
- 2010: Memories Of John
