= This Side (song) =

Single by Nickel Creek

from the album This Side
- Released: 2003
- Genre: Progressive bluegrass
- Length: 3:33
- Label: Sugar Hill
- Songwriter: Sean Watkins
- Producer: Alison Krauss

Nickel Creek singles chronology
"Reasons Why" (2002)	"This Side" (2003)	"Spit on a Stranger" (2003)

"This Side" is a song by the progressive bluegrass band Nickel Creek and the first single from their second album, This Side. Sean Watkins takes vocal duties for "This Side".

The song was written by Sean Watkins. It is one of three songs recorded by Nickel Creek that were written single-handedly by Sean, the other two being "Somebody More Like You" on Why Should the Fire Die?, and "Speak". The single peaked at #56 on the U.S. Billboard Hot Country Singles & Tracks chart.

== Synopsis ==
"This Side" is about going through a transition to a different lifestyle, being scared at first, but then feeling comfortable with the change. The narrator sings "it's foreign on this side, and I'll not leave my home again". Later, he changes his mind, by singing "it's foreign on this side, but it feels like I'm home again".

== Chart performance ==
Chart (2003)	Peak position
US Hot Country Songs (Billboard)	56

== Personnel ==
- Sean Watkins - guitar, lead vocals
- Sara Watkins - fiddle, harmony vocals
- Chris Thile - mandolin, harmony vocals
- Byron House - acoustic bass
