= The Lighthouse's Tale =

Single by Nickel Creek

from the album Nickel Creek
- B-side: "The Fox", "Let It Fall"
- Released: 2001
- Recorded: 1999
- Genre: Progressive bluegrass
- Length: 5:01
- Label: Sugar Hill
- Songwriters: Adam McKenzie; Chris Thile
- Producer: Alison Krauss

Nickel Creek singles chronology
"When You Come Back Down" (2001)	"The Lighthouse's Tale" (2001)	"Reasons Why" (2002)

"The Lighthouse's Tale" is a song by progressive bluegrass band Nickel Creek, taken from their third album, Nickel Creek, released in 2001.

== Single details ==
"The Lighthouse's Tale" was written by Adam McKenzie & Chris Thile. At five minutes and one second, it is the longest single ever released by Nickel Creek. A sequel to the song, "The Lighthouse's Tale, Part 2", was played by Nickel Creek at several of their concerts, but not released with the single.

A music video for the song was released with the single and featured footage of the band at various locations. These include many locations near water, such as a lighthouse by the ocean, a bridge over a small river, and a mountainside lake. The lighthouse in the video is the Cape Neddick Light, near York, Maine.

== Synopsis ==
"The Lighthouse's Tale" is about a lighthouse, the keeper, and his fiancée. The lighthouse serves as a narrator to tell how the keeper was going to marry a beautiful woman who had to sail in a fierce storm. She doesn't survive the journey. The next day, the lighthouse "watched as he [the keeper] buried her in the sand. And then he climbed my tower, and off of the edge of me he ran." The lighthouse concludes by saying "and though I am empty, I still warn the sailors on their way." The lyrics of the chorus are: "And the waves crashing around me, the sand slips out to sea, and the winds that blow remind me of what has been and what can never be."

A critic for the Houston Chronicle said in an article regarding the release of Why Should the Fire Die? that Nickel Creek once "sung sweetly about foxes and lighthouses," however, two thirds of the characters in "The Lighthouse's Tale" die.

== Track listing ==
1. "The Lighthouse's Tale" (Radio Edit)
2. "The Fox" (Live)
3. "Let It Fall" (Live)
4. "The Lighthouse's Tale" (Music Video)

== Personnel ==
- Chris Thile - Mandolin, Lead Vocals
- Sara Watkins - Violin, Harmony Vocals
- Sean Watkins - Guitar, Harmony Vocals
- Scott Thile - Acoustic Bass

== Chart performance ==
Chart (2001)	Peak position
UK Singles Chart	147
US Hot Country Songs (Billboard)	49
