= Can't Complain =

- Poster
- Directed by: Richard Johnson
- Written by: Corey Williams
- Produced by: Corey Williams
- Starring: Gary-Kayi Fletcher; Mia Barnes; Gabe Baez; Tyeisha Gibson; Ayanna Dookie; Jace Nicole; Tony Folden; Trinetta Wright; Marat Mostovoy; Paul Wiedecker; Alexis Monet; Dawn Hoff; Beth Sopel
- Music by: Mike Davis
- Production company: GoldenTiger Productions
- Distributed by: GoldenTiger Productions
- Release date: October 27, 2009 (Sexy International)
- Running time: 90 minutes
- Country: United States
- Language: English

Can't Complain is a 2009 American independent comedy film written and produced by Corey Williams. This was director Richard Johnson's second feature length narrative film.

== Plot ==
When Kevin finds out that his sister's friend is rich due to having a baby with a professional basketball player, he and his roommate set their sights on getting female athletes pregnant and taking them to court for child support.

== Cast ==
- Gary-Kayi Fletcher as Kevin Grant
- Mia Barnes as Kristen Matthews
- Gabe Baez as Orlando (O) Sanchez
- Ayanna Dookie as Shonda Williams
- Jace Nicole - Kim Johnson
- Tony Folden as Sammy
- Tyeisha Gibson as Carla Grant
- Trinetta Wright as Maria
- Paul Wiedecker as Attorney
- Beth Sopel as Sue Marshall
- Marat Mosotovoy as Producer
- Alexis Monet as Shannon
- Tiphany Johnson as Coach Kerns
- Dawn Hoff - Jen Rivers
- Douglas Farley - Dick Jenkins
- Tony Fleming - Damien Lang

== Production ==
The film was shot in 49 days in Baltimore and Joppa, Maryland. Producer Corey Williams and Director Richard Johnson cast the film. Comedian Ayanna Dookie's comedy standup scenes were filmed first.

== Release ==
Can't Complain was released on DVD and Video on Demand on June 20, 2010.
