= Watkins Family Hour =

American bluegrass band led by Sara and Sean Watkins

- Origin: Los Angeles, California
- Genres: Bluegrass music, folk music
- Years active: 2002–present
- Labels: Family Hour Records; Thirty Tigers
- Spinoff of: Nickel Creek
- Members: Sara Watkins; Sean Watkins; Benmont Tench; Greg Leisz; Fiona Apple; Sebastian Steinberg; Don Heffington
- Website: watkinsfamilyhour.com

Watkins Family Hour is a bluegrass musical collaborative led by siblings Sara Watkins and Sean Watkins, who also form two-thirds of the Americana music group Nickel Creek. The group began in 2002 as a monthly, informal musical variety show with the Watkins siblings and their friends in the Los Angeles nightclub Largo.

Their eponymous debut album, which consists entirely of covers, was released on July 24, 2015, on Family Hour Records via Thirty Tigers, and was produced by Sheldon Gomberg. In addition to Sara and Sean Watkins, musicians who performed on this album include Fiona Apple, Lone Justice's Don Heffington, Benmont Tench, Greg Leisz, and Soul Coughing’s Sebastian Steinberg. According to Metacritic, Watkins Family Hour received generally favorable reviews from critics; on the site, the album has a score of 76 out of 100, based on six reviews.

Their second album, Brother Sister, was released on January 17, 2020, by Family Hour Records and Thirty Tigers, and their third album Vol. II was released August 19, 2022, by Family Hour.
