= A Dotted Line =

Studio album by Nickel Creek
- Released: April 1, 2014
- Genre: Progressive bluegrass
- Label: Nonesuch
- Producer: Eric Valentine

Nickel Creek chronology
Reasons Why: The Very Best (2006)	A Dotted Line (2014)	Celebrants (2023)

A Dotted Line is the fourth major album release and sixth studio album overall by progressive acoustic trio Nickel Creek. Produced by Eric Valentine, the album was released on Nonesuch Records on April 1, 2014, in the United States.

A Dotted Line is the first Nickel Creek album since the band's hiatus following their 2007 Farewell (For Now) Tour. The release coincided with the trio's 25th anniversary. A subsequent tour was also scheduled to begin in April.

Tracks include initial singles "Destination" and "Love of Mine," as well as two covers: Sam Phillips' "Where Is Love Now" and Mother Mother's "Hayloft."

== Critical reception ==
Professional ratings
Aggregate scores
Source	Rating
Metacritic	82/100
Review scores
Source	Rating
The A.V. Club	B+
About.com	4.5/5 stars
AllMusic	3.5/5 stars
The Oakland Press	3.5/4 stars
Paste	8.2/10
PopMatters	8/10 discs
USA Today	3.5/4 stars

A Dotted Line garnered critical acclaim. At Metacritic, they assign a "weighted average" rating to albums based upon the reviews by selected independent publications, and the album's score is an 82 out of 100, which means the album received "universal acclaim". At Allmusic, Stephen Thomas Erlewine rated the album three-and-a-half stars out of five, stating that even "If there isn't much spark, there is a surplus of warmth; the trio is comfortable and relaxed, and it's hard not to succumb to such friendly, familiar vibes." Brian Mansfield of USA Today rated the album three-and-a-half stars out of four stars, writing how on the release the trio "stretch pop parameters with imaginative arrangements." At The Oakland Press, Gary Graff rated the album three-and-a-half out of four stars, saying that the release is "a welcome return from a hiatus well-spent." About.com's Kim Ruehl rated the album four-and-a-half stars out of five, stating that on the release the trio did "no harm in exploring" musical territory as they seek to "push the evolution of music by starting with tradition and taking it somewhere some folks may say it has no business going."

At Paste, Holly Gleason rated the album 8.2 out of 10, writing that the release is "Not merely a product of maturity, Nickel Creek has grown without losing its palpable joy or wondrous ability to make musicianship as accessible as the engaging way their voices draw listeners to them." Brice Ezell rated the album eight out of 10 discs, stating that the release "is a work of supreme songcraft; one might call it a 'return to form', but from the sound of it, the form was never gone in the first place." At The A.V. Club, Genevieve Koski graded the album a B+, saying how the release is "a ready-made best-of album, superb in execution but light on surprises". Sarah Rodman of The Boston Globe gave a positive review of the album, remarking how the release "is a vibrant reminder of Nickel Creek's youthful promise and proof that it has plenty left to say." At Relix, Kiran Herbert gave a positive review, observing that "there's not a song on the album that falls short."

== Track listing ==
All tracks written by Chris Thile, Sara Watkins, and Sean Watkins unless noted.

No.	Title	Writer(s)	Length
1.	"Rest of My Life"		3:40
2.	"Destination"		3:51
3.	"Elsie"	Chris Thile	2:33
4.	"Christmas Eve"		4:23
5.	"Hayloft"	Ryan Guldemond	3:18
6.	"21st of May"	Sean Watkins	2:47
7.	"Love of Mine"		4:42
8.	"Elephant in the Corn"		5:10
9.	"You Don't Know What's Going On"		2:50
10.	"Where Is Love Now"	Sam Phillips	4:42

== Personnel ==
- Chris Thile - Bouzouki, Mandolin, Vocals
- Sara Watkins - Fiddle, Vocals
- Sean Watkins - Guitar, Vocals

Additional musicians:

- Mark Schatz - Bass
- Edgar Meyer - Bowed Bass
- Matt Chamberlain - Percussion
- Eric Valentine - Percussion

== Production ==
- Eric Valentine - Producer, Engineer, Mixing, Mastering
- Cian Riordan - Engineer
- Justin Long - Studio Assistant

== Charts ==
The album debuted at No. 7 on the Billboard 200 with 27,000 copies sold in its first week in the US. As of May 2014, the album has sold 47,000 copies in the US.

Chart (2014)	Peak position
Hungarian Albums (MAHASZ)	32
US Billboard 200	7
US Top Bluegrass Albums (Billboard)	1
US Americana/Folk Albums (Billboard)	1
