= This Side =

Studio album by Nickel Creek
- Released: August 13, 2002
- Genre: Progressive bluegrass
- Length: 49:58
- Label: Sugar Hill
- Producer: Alison Krauss

Nickel Creek chronology
Nickel Creek (2000)	This Side (2002)	Why Should the Fire Die? (2005)

Singles from This Side
- 1. "This Side"; 2. "Speak"; 3. "Smoothie Song"

Alternative cover
- Japanese cover

Professional ratings
Review scores
Source	Rating
Allmusic	4.5/5 stars
Billboard	(positive)
The Phantom Tollbooth	4.5/5 stars
PopMatters	(mixed)

This Side is the Grammy-winning second major album release by the progressive bluegrass band Nickel Creek, released on Sugar Hill in the summer of 2002. It gained attention in indie rock circles due to the group's recording of a Pavement song, "Spit on a Stranger". Alison Krauss acted as a producer for the album.

== Track listing ==
No.	Title	Writer(s)	Length
1.	"Smoothie Song"	Chris Thile	3:20
2.	"Spit on a Stranger"	Stephen Malkmus	2:34
3.	"Speak"	Sean Watkins	4:01
4.	"Hanging by a Thread"	Gordon Kennedy, Wayne Kirkpatrick	4:06
5.	"I Should've Known Better"	Carrie Newcomer	4:27
6.	"This Side"	Sean Watkins	3:33
7.	"Green and Gray"	Chris Thile	3:36
8.	"Seven Wonders"	Sean Watkins, David Puckett	4:10
9.	"House Carpenter" (version of "The Daemon Lover")	Traditional	5:30
10.	"Beauty and the Mess"	Chris Thile, Luke Bulla	2:52
11.	"Sabra Girl" (originally titled "Time Will Cure me")	Andy Irvine	4:04
12.	"Young"	Chris Thile	3:29
13.	"Brand New Sidewalk"	Chris Thile	4:16
Total length:			49:58

Japanese bonus track
No.	Title	Writer(s)	Length
14.	"Smoothie Song"	Chris Thile	3:20
Total length:			53:18

== Chart performance ==
=== Weekly charts ===
Chart (2002)	Peak position	Certification
U.S. Billboard 200	18	Gold
U.S. Billboard Top Country Albums	2	Gold
U.S. Billboard Top Independent Albums	1	Gold
U.S. Billboard Top Bluegrass Albums	1	Gold
UK Country Albums (Official Charts)	5	Gold

=== Year-end charts ===
Chart (2002)	Position
US Top Country Albums (Billboard)	33
Chart (2003)	Position
US Top Country Albums (Billboard)	37

== Personnel ==
=== Nickel Creek ===
- Chris Thile – mandolin, bouzouki, guitar, strings, arranger, vocals, harmony vocals
- Sara Watkins – fiddle, ukulele, guitar, strings, arranger, vocals, harmony vocals
- Sean Watkins – guitar, arranger, vocals, harmony vocals

=== Other musicians ===
- Byron House – upright bass
- Edgar Meyer – upright bass
- Robert Trujillo – upright bass in the "Smoothie Song" video

== Credits ==
- Producer: Alison Krauss
- Engineers: Gary Paczosa, Neal Cappellino, Jason Lehning, Tracy Martinson
- Assistant engineers: Eric Bickel, Rob Clark, Thomas Johnson
- Mixing: Gary Paczosa
- Surround mix: Gary Paczosa
- Mixing assistant: Eric Bickel
- Mastering: Don Cobb, Eric Conn, Robert Hadley, Doug Sax
- SACD mastering: Don Cobb, Eric Conn
- Editing: Tracy Martinson
- Production assistants: Jennie Billo, Tasha Thomas
- Art direction: Wendy Stamberger
- Design: Wendy Stamberger
- Photography: John Chiasson
- Illustrations: Terry Hoff
- Assistant: Eric Bickel
