= When You Come Back Down =

Single by Nickel Creek

from the album Nickel Creek
- Released: 2001
- Recorded: 1999
- Genre: Progressive bluegrass
- Length: 3:49
- Label: Sugar Hill
- Songwriters: Danny O'Keefe, Tim O'Brien
- Producer: Alison Krauss

Nickel Creek singles chronology
"When You Come Back Down" (2001)	"The Lighthouse's Tale" (2001)

"When You Come Back Down" was the debut single by progressive bluegrass band Nickel Creek from their self titled debut album. The song is a cover of the bluegrass musician Tim O'Brien's original version. The song was written by Danny O'Keefe and Tim O'Brien.

== Music video ==
Sara Watkins described the making of the music video in 2000:

...the day before yesterday (Monday) we made our SECOND VIDEO! This is amazing! Not only have we gotten to do one this year, but now TWO! This one is for song "When You Come Back Down" off of our self titled CD. We were fortunate enough to be able to work with the awesome Brent Hedgecock again as the director and producer. There were some of the same people in the crew as well. We had so much fun! I don't want to spoil too much of it, but we shot most of it on a Mountain top overlooking Malibu in California. We're all really excited about it.

== Chart performance ==
Chart (2001)	Peak position
US Hot Country Songs (Billboard)	48

== Personnel ==
- Chris Thile - Mandolin, Lead Vocals
- Sean Watkins - Guitar, Harmony Vocals
- Sara Watkins - Violin, Harmony Vocals
- Scott Thile - Acoustic Bass
