= Nickel Creek =

American bluegrass band

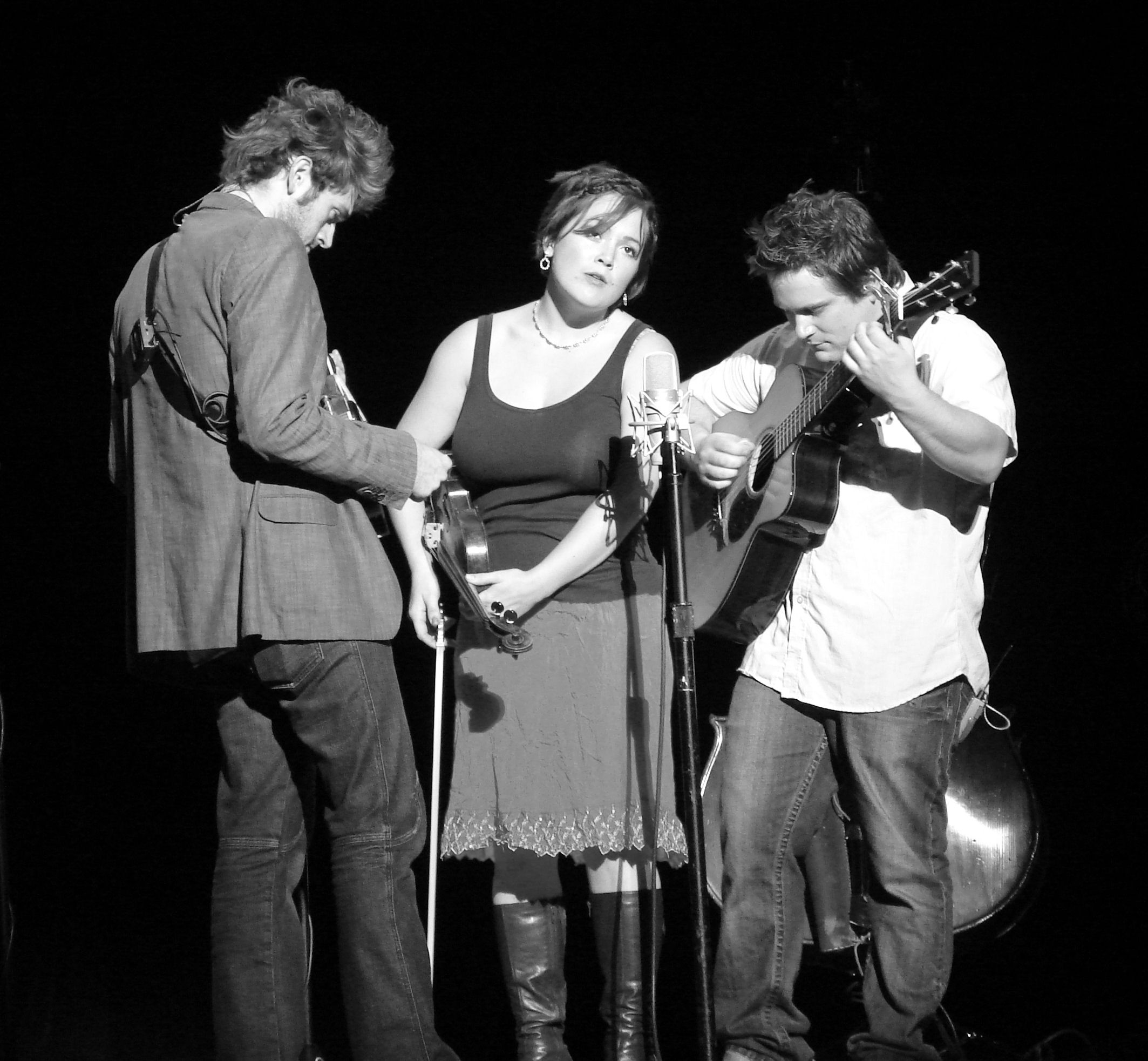
- Chris Thile, Sara Watkins, and Sean Watkins at Michigan Theater in Ann Arbor, Michigan on the Farewell (For Now) Tour, October 2007

Background information
- Also known as: The Nickel Creek Band
- Origin: Carlsbad, California, U.S.
- Genres: Progressive bluegrass; acoustic pop; country; folk rock
- Years active: 1989–2007, 2014–present
- Labels: Sugar Hill Records; Nonesuch Records; Elektra Records
- Spinoffs: Punch Brothers; The Goat Rodeo Sessions; Mutual Admiration Society; Watkins Family Hour; I'm With Her; Fiction Family
- Members: Chris Thile; Sara Watkins; Sean Watkins
- Past members: Byron House; Derek Jones; Scott Thile; Mark Schatz; Dave Spicher
- Website: nickelcreek.com

Nickel Creek (formerly known as the Nickel Creek Band) is an American bluegrass band consisting of Chris Thile (mandolin), and siblings Sara Watkins (fiddle) and Sean Watkins (guitar). Formed in 1989 in Carlsbad, California, they released six albums between 1993 and 2006. The band broke out in 2000 with a platinum-selling self-titled album produced by Alison Krauss, earning a number of Grammy and CMA nominations.

Their fourth album "This Side" won a 2003 Grammy Award for Best Contemporary Folk Album. After a fifth studio album and a compilation album, the band announced an indefinite hiatus at the conclusion of their 2007 Farewell (For Now) Tour. After numerous solo projects from the band members, Nickel Creek reformed in 2014 announcing new album and subsequent tour.

== History ==
The Watkins and Thile families met after Sean Watkins and Chris Thile had mandolin lessons with the same music instructor, John Moore. Sara studied with Moore's bandmate, Dennis Caplinger. The band name comes from a song by Byron Berline, who was Sara's fiddle instructor.

=== Early days: 1989–99 ===
Nickel Creek's first performance was at That Pizza Place in Carlsbad, California, in 1989 with Scott Thile, Chris's father, playing string bass. The oldest of the Watkins children, Sean was only twelve years old at the time. At the start of Nickel Creek's history, Chris Thile played guitar and Sean Watkins played mandolin but later they decided to switch instruments. The band played many bluegrass festivals throughout the 1990s, and the band members were homeschooled to accommodate their tour schedule. Nickel Creek's first two albums were Little Cowpoke (1993) and Here to There (1997).

=== Nickel Creek: 2000–01 ===
Nickel Creek met Alison Krauss at one of their shows and later invited her to produce their next album. According to band member Sara Watkins, the group was "thrilled" with the guidance they received from Krauss to upgrade their vocal sound and the overall "production of the CD."

The group received two Grammy nominations: Best Bluegrass Album and Best Country Instrumental for the song "Ode to a Butterfly". The trio was nominated at the Country Music Awards for Best Vocal Group and the Horizon Award and were named one of the "Five Music Innovators of the Millennium" by TIME Magazine in May 2000. Nickel Creek's "The Lighthouse's Tale" video was nominated for a CMT "Flameworthy Video Award" for Group/Duo Video of the Year.

The band went on tour and opened eleven shows for Lyle Lovett in the summer of 2000 and appeared on Austin City Limits in January 2001 with Dolly Parton. A month later, Parton invited Nickel Creek to perform as her backup band at the 2001 Grammy Awards. The trio also had a spring tour with Glen Phillips in a collaboration dubbed Mutual Admiration Society. A self-titled album was set for release, but was delayed until 2004. Nickel Creek also opened for Vince Gill and Amy Grant that winter. Shortly after Nickel Creek began touring, Scott Thile decided to leave the band to spend time with his family. Bassist Byron House took his place; House was replaced by bassist Derek Jones in March 2001.

=== This Side: 2002–04 ===
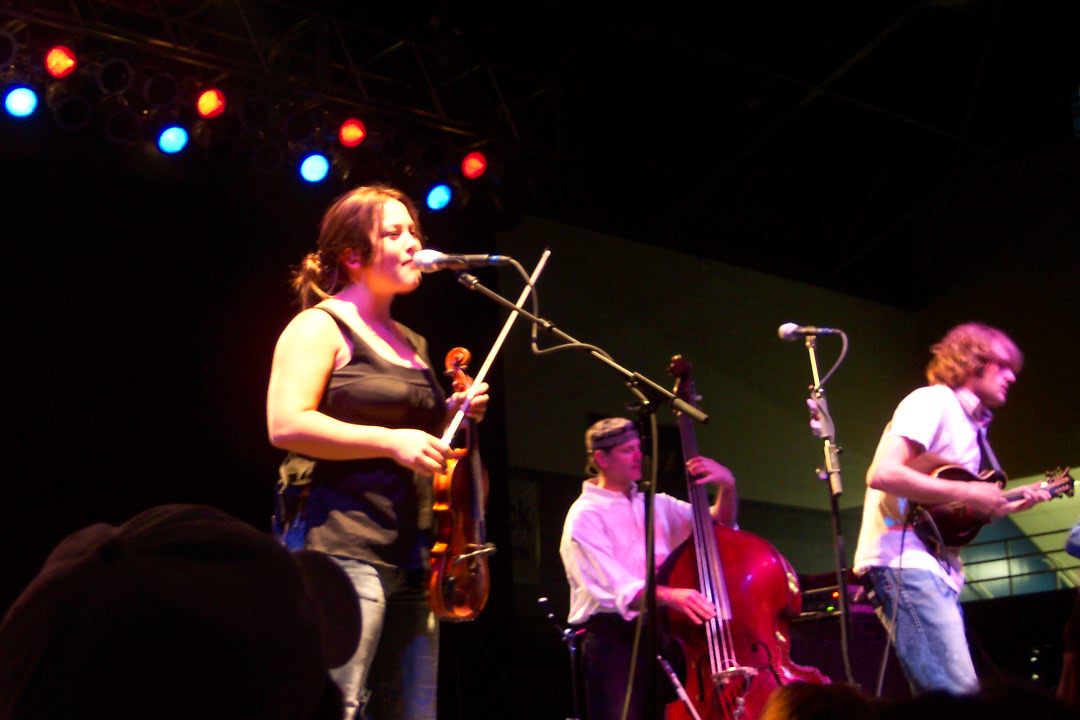
Sara Watkins, Mark Schatz, and Chris Thile touring after the release of This Side, performing in Morehead, Kentucky, September 2003

In 2002, the band released their fourth album, This Side, produced by Alison Krauss. It was a departure from their previous, purely bluegrass releases. The core bluegrass influence remained, but with other genres including indie rock and folk rock and they included cover songs—"Spit on a Stranger" by Pavement and "I Should've Known Better" by Carrie Newcomer. A review in AllMusic said that "Thile and the Watkins siblings' originals, easily outdo the likes of folk-rockers Dave Matthews and Hootie & the Blowfish, while forging a new style to rejuvenate a genre that has always been a bit of a dark horse."

This Side entered the Billboard 200 at No. 18 on the chart, and at No. 2 on the magazine's Top Country Albums chart. The album was certified gold in 2003 by the RIAA. The success of This Side earned the group a Grammy Award for Best Contemporary Folk Album. The band was featured in Rolling Stone's "Best Of 2002" edition.

During their 2002 and 2003 tour, Nickel Creek opened five shows for John Mayer in November 2002, and toured with Gillian Welch and David Rawlings earlier in the year. In 2003, Nickel Creek appeared on the Béla Fleck and the Flecktones album Little Worlds.

=== Why Should the Fire Die?: 2005 ===
In 2005, the band released their fifth album, Why Should the Fire Die? with more rock and pop influences. The album debuted and peaked at No. 17 on the Billboard 200 and topped the Billboard bluegrass chart. In the summer of 2006, Nickel Creek appeared at numerous music festivals including Bonnaroo, High Sierra Music Festival, Austin City Limits, SXSW, Lollapalooza and Star Fest.

=== Farewell (For Now) Tour: 2006–07 ===
In late summer 2006, via Billboard and their official website, Nickel Creek announced that at the end of the year they would no longer record as a group and their tour, scheduled through 2007, would be their last for an indefinite period so band members could expand their musical horizons.

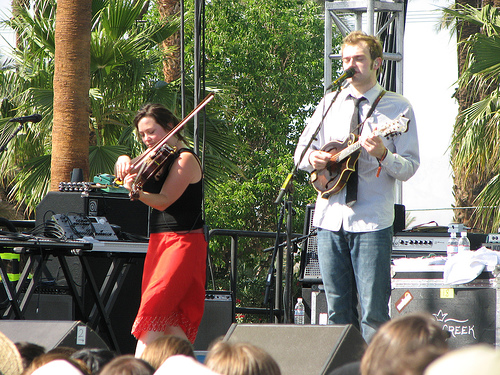
Sara Watkins and Chris Thile on the Farewell (For Now) Tour at Coachella, April 2007

In November 2006, Sugar Hill released Reasons Why: The Very Best, a compilation of selected studio tracks from Nickel Creek's three latest albums, as well as two previously unreleased tracks and all of the music videos from the trio's singles. Their seven-month Farewell (For Now) Tour started in April 2007 and ended in November. The tour was originally to be called the Victory Lap Tour, but the band's managers thought that would sound "presumptuous and boastful."

The tour featured guest appearances by Glen Phillips, Jon Brion, Fiona Apple, Bruce Molsky, Bela Fleck, Tom Brosseau and Tift Merritt, among others.

=== Reunion and A Dotted Line: 2014–2020 ===
The band announced on February 3, 2014, that they would release a new album in the spring of 2014. Titled A Dotted Line, the album was produced by previous collaborator Eric Valentine and marked the group's first release on Nonesuch Records. Released on April 1, 2014, in the United States, the album coincided with the group's 25th anniversary. A subsequent tour began in April 2014 with over two dozen dates.

Nickel Creek has occasionally reunited to perform on the radio show Live from Here (hosted by Thile), including once in November 2017 and again in February 2019. A Dotted Line's "Destination" was selected as the theme song for the Netflix original series, "Sweet Magnolias." The series premiered on May 19, 2020. On October 2, 2020, the band announced the release of their debut live album, Live From The Fox Theater, recorded on May 19, 2014, at the Fox Theater in Oakland, CA .

=== Nickel Stream: A Livecreek Experience (2021) ===
On February 9, 2021, Nickel Creek announced a series of livestream concerts on Feb. 21 and 28 as the start of a new series known as Livecreek. They continued to release other streams throughout early 2021.

=== Celebrants (2023) ===
After intermittent performances between 2014 and 2019, Nickel Creek began writing new material in early 2021. On January 24, 2023, Nickel Creek announced a new album titled Celebrants, slated for release on March 24, 2023. The lead single "Strangers" was released the day the album was announced. They then announced a tour on February 7, 2023. On 27 August 2023 they played Towersey Festival in Buckingham, England.

== Awards and nominations ==
=== Wins ===
- 2000: IBMA Emerging Artist of the Year
- 2001: IBMA Instrumental Group of the Year
- 2002: Grammy Award for Best Contemporary Folk Album (This Side)
- 2006: CMT Top 10 Country Compilations of 2006 (Reasons Why: The Very Best)
- 2023: Americana Trailblazer Award

=== Nominations ===
- 2001: Grammy Award for Best Bluegrass Album (Nickel Creek)
- 2001: Grammy Award for Best Country Instrumental Performance ("Ode to a Butterfly")
- 2001: CMA Horizon Award
- 2001: Country Music Association Award for Vocal Group of the Year
- 2005: Grammy Award for Best Contemporary Folk Album (Why Should the Fire Die?)
- 2005: Grammy Award for Best Country Instrumental Performance ("Scotch & Chocolate")
- 2015: Grammy Award for Best American Roots Performance ("Destination")
- 2015: Grammy Award for Best Americana Album (A Dotted Line)
- 2023: Americana Music Award for Duo/Group of the Year
- 2024: Grammy Award for Best Folk Album (Celebrants)

== Discography ==
=== Albums ===
- 1993: Little Cowpoke
- 1997: Here to There
- 2000: Nickel Creek
- 2002: This Side
- 2005: Why Should the Fire Die?
- 2014: A Dotted Line
- 2023: Celebrants

=== Compilations ===
- 2006: Reasons Why: The Very Best

=== Live albums ===
- 2021: Live from the Fox Theater

=== Singles ===
- 2001: "When You Come Back Down"
- 2001: "The Lighthouse's Tale"
- 2002: "Reasons Why"
- 2003: "This Side"
- 2003: "Speak"
- 2003: "Smoothie Song"
- 2005: "When in Rome"
- 2014: "Destination"
- 2023: "Strangers"
- 2023: "Holding Pattern"
- 2023: "Where the Long Line Leads"
