= Sara Watkins =

American singer-songwriter and fiddler (born 1981)

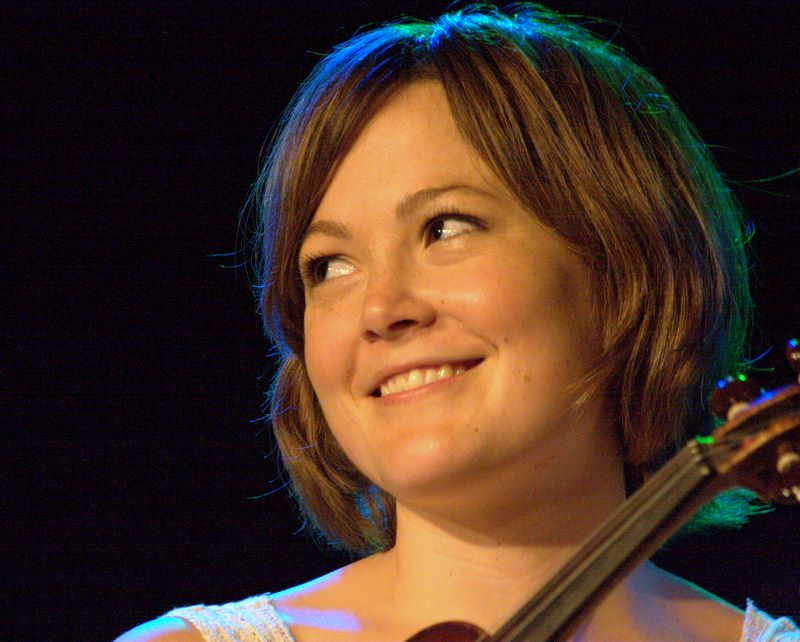
- Watkins in 2009 at the ArtsCenter in Carrboro, North Carolina

Background information
- Born: Sara Ullrika Watkins; June 8, 1981 (age 45)
- Origin: Vista, California, U.S.
- Genres: Bluegrass, folk, country
- Occupation: Singer-songwriter
- Instruments: Vocals, fiddle, guitar, ukulele, percussion
- Years active: 1989–present
- Labels: Nonesuch; Sugar Hill
- Member of: Nickel Creek, Mutual Admiration Society, Works Progress Administration, I'm With Her, Watkins Family Hour
- Website: Official website

Sara Ullrika Watkins (born June 8, 1981) is an American singer-songwriter and fiddler. Watkins debuted in 1989 as the fiddler of Nickel Creek, the progressive bluegrass group she formed with her brother Sean and mandolinist Chris Thile. In addition to singing and fiddling, Watkins also plays the ukulele and the guitar, and also played percussion while touring with the Decemberists. In 2012, she and her brother played with Jackson Browne during his "I'll Do Anything" acoustic tour. Watkins is also a member of the groups I'm With Her, Mutual Admiration Society, Watkins Family Hour, and Works Progress Administration.

With Nickel Creek, Watkins released five studio albums, one compilation album, and seven singles. During the band's seven-year hiatus, she released three solo albums: Sara Watkins and Sun Midnight Sun on Nonesuch Records and Young in All the Wrong Ways on New West Records.

== Biography ==
=== 2007–present: Solo career ===
In late 2005, Watkins stated in a PopMatters interview when discussing her first solo-written recorded song, "Anthony", that she "definitely [makes] the effort [to write more], but it's something that doesn't come too easy for me. Nor does it come really easy for the guys, I think they've just been doing it for a very long time."

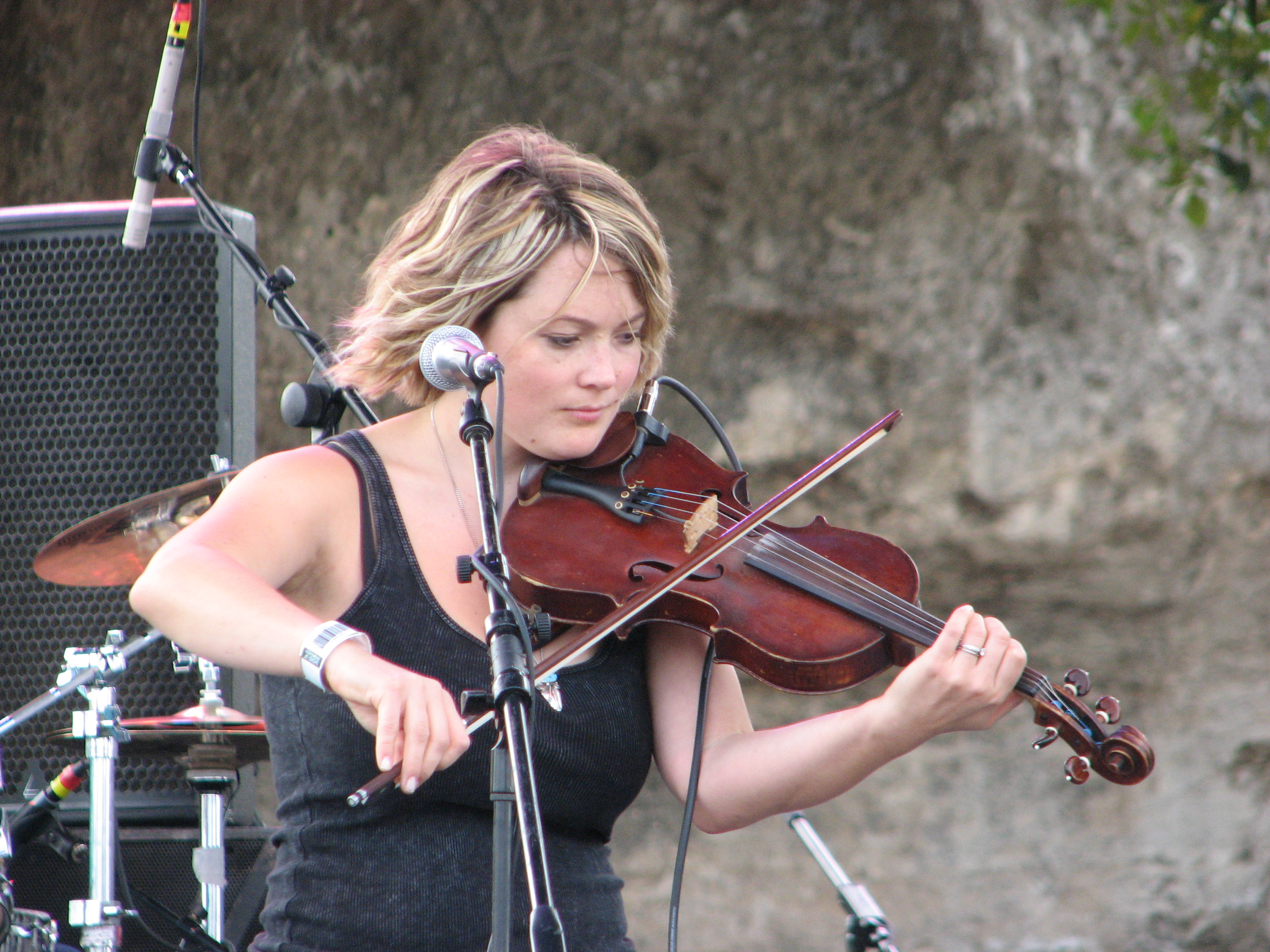
Watkins performing at Austin City Limits Music Festival in 2009

Watkins signed as a solo artist with Nonesuch Records in fall 2008 and released her self-titled debut solo album on April 7, 2009. Watkins started recording the album in February 2008, and it was jointly recorded in Nashville and Los Angeles. Sara Watkins was produced by bassist John Paul Jones of Led Zeppelin fame, who first performed with Watkins on a Mutual Admiration Society tour in 2004.

Watkins toured the United States as an opening act in 2008. She performed short tours as an opening act for singer-songwriter Tift Merritt along the West Coast in March and April and with Robert Earl Keen around New England in September, as well as doing a 17-date tour with Donavon Frankenreiter in October. On April 14, 2009, she appeared on Late Night with Jimmy Fallon, with Jones on bass, Questlove of The Roots on drums, and her brother Sean Watkins on guitar. On August 28, 2011, she made her debut with A Prairie Home Companion, at the Minnesota State Fair. In 2012, she toured with Jackson Browne as the opening act for his acoustic winter tour.

In September 2011, Watkins indicated via Twitter that she would begin work on a second album in the fall of 2011. In May 2012, Watkins released her second solo album, Sun Midnight Sun, again on Nonesuch Records. Produced by former Simon Dawes guitarist Blake Mills, it features guest appearances from Fiona Apple and Jackson Browne.

In 2016, Watkins won "Instrumentalist of the Year" at the Americana Music Honors & Awards.

=== Other projects ===
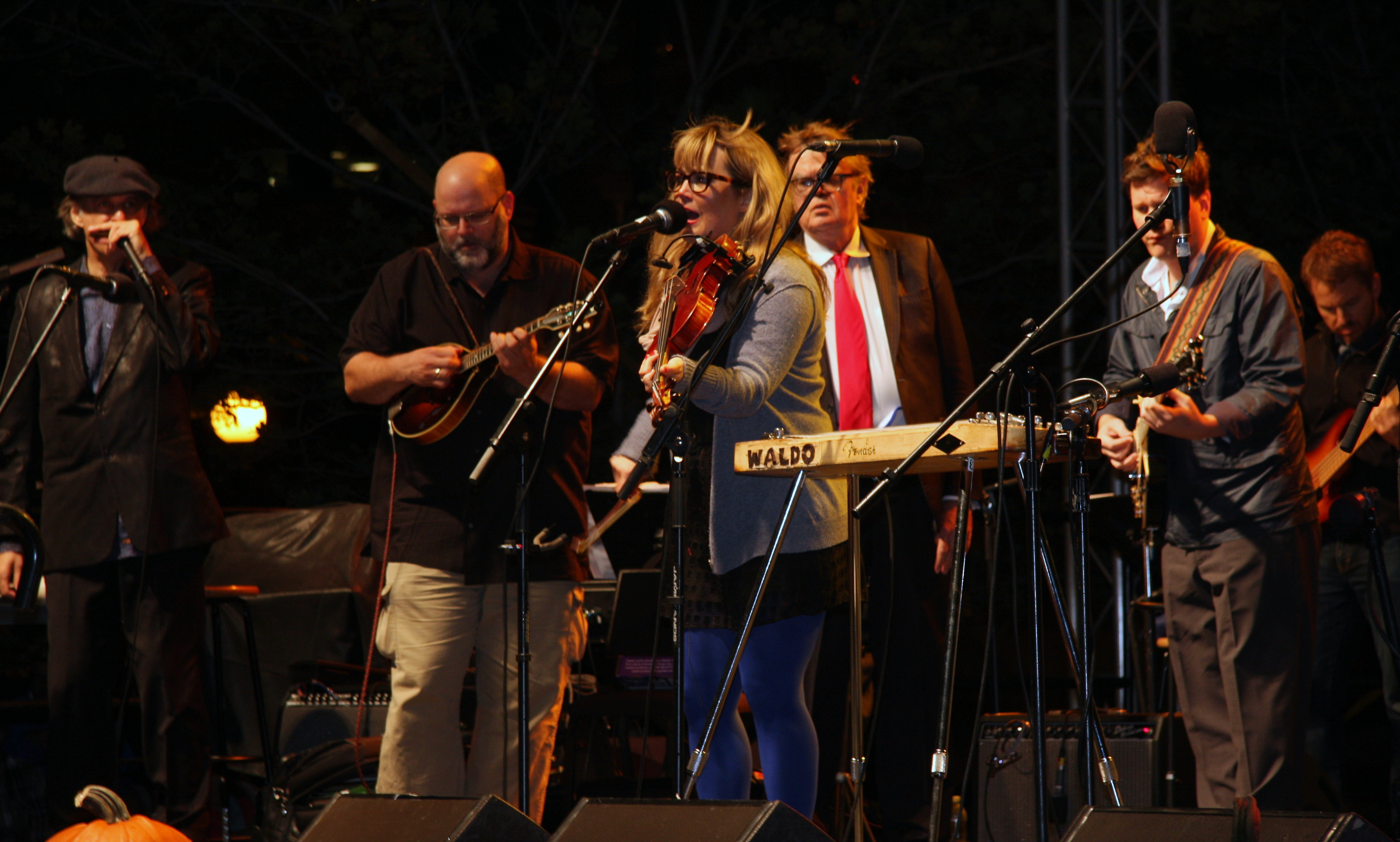
Watkins performing at the season opening of A Prairie Home Companion, 2014

In 2002, Watkins starred in an advertisement for cell phone provider Cingular Wireless alongside her former fiddle teacher Dennis Caplinger, as well as other prominent bluegrass artists. Between 2000 and 2004, Watkins and the other members of Nickel Creek (Chris Thile and Sean Watkins), Glen Phillips, John Paul Jones, and Pete Thomas collaborated on an EP, Mutual Admiration Society Solo Sampler; an album, Mutual Admiration Society (recorded in 2000); and a brief tour.

The 2007 documentary film Arctic Tale featured a song by Watkins and musician Grant-Lee Phillips, titled "Song of the North (Beneath the Sun)". Watkins lent her vocal talents to the film alongside other performers such as Aimee Mann and Brian Wilson.

In January 2008, Billboard reported a new supergroup octet tentatively named The Scrolls, later named Works Progress Administration (W.P.A.). The octet is composed of Watkins, her brother Sean Watkins (guitar), Glen Phillips (guitar, vocals), Benmont Tench (piano), Luke Bulla (fiddle), Greg Leisz (various), Pete Thomas (drums), and Davey Faragher (bass). The group released their album WPA in September 2009.

Watkins is featured on Needtobreathe's 2009 CD The Outsiders on the track "Stones Under Rushing Water".

In late January and early February 2010, Watkins undertook a short tour with Jerry Douglas and Aly Bain in Scotland and England under the "Transatlantic Sessions" banner, culminating in a performance in the Royal Festival Hall in London on February 6, 2010. In June 2010, Watkins appeared on the Nerdist podcast as a musical guest, performing her best-known solo song, "Long Hot Summer Days" (a John Hartford cover). Later that summer, she participated in the Summer Love Tour with Garrison Keillor in venues across the United States. She guest hosted Keillor's show, A Prairie Home Companion, on January 15, 2011. Watkins contributed fiddle, guitar, percussion, and vocals on The Decemberists' 2011 tour. Also in 2011, she (and her brother Sean) began to perform as a musician and singer in the humor/retro-radio podcast "Thrilling Adventure Hour".

Watkins played violin and sang on "A Face To Call Home" on John Mayer's 2012 album Born and Raised. During 2012 and 2013, she toured with Jackson Browne, both as an opening act and accompanying him during the performance.

Watkins and her brother Sean play regularly at the Largo nightclub in Los Angeles as "Watkins Family Hour". Keyboardist Benmont Tench (of Tom Petty and the Heartbreakers) and bassist Sebastian Steinberg (formerly of Soul Coughing) are regular participants, and other guest musicians from the Largo family generally show up as well, including Jon Brion, Fiona Apple, Don Heffington, Greg Leisz, and former Nickel Creek bandmate Chris Thile when he is in town. The irregular collaborations led to a 2015 album and tour under the same name. Also in 2015, Watkins toured extensively with Sarah Jarosz and Aoife O'Donovan (of Crooked Still fame). The trio, who since then have played under the name I'm With Her, hosted the radio show A Prairie Home Companion on October 10, 2015. Watkins also performed vocals for "June & Johnny" on Jon Foreman's 2015 EP The Wonderlands: Darkness.

In 2020, she played fiddle on Phoebe Bridgers's record Punisher, on track 10 "Graceland Too".

In 2021, she played fiddle on The Killers's record Pressure Machine (Tracks: West Fields, Cody, Pressure Machine) and violin on In Another Life.

In 2026, Watkins, her brother Sean and fellow Nickel Creek bandmate Chris Thile were credited with playing fiddle, violin, mandolin, and acoustic guitar on Phoebe Bridgers's album Lost Weekend, on track 7 "Haunted".

=== Personal life ===
On August 16, 2008, Watkins married Todd Cooper in her parents' backyard in Vista, California. On June 15, 2017, she announced via Twitter that she and her husband were expecting a child in September.

== Discography ==
=== Solo career ===
==== Studio albums ====
Title	Details	Peak chart positions		
Title	Details	US	US Folk	US Heat
Sara Watkins	Release date: April 7, 2009; Label: Nonesuch Records	—	—	13
Sun Midnight Sun	Release date: May 8, 2012; Label: Nonesuch Records	—	11	16
Young in All the Wrong Ways	Release date: July 1, 2016; Label: New West Records	200	7	1
Under the Pepper Tree	Release date: March 26, 2021; Label: New West Records			
"—" denotes releases that did not chart

==== Music videos ====
Year	Video	Director
2012	"When It Pleases You"	Peter Zavadil
2013	"You and Me"	Russ Kendall
2016	"Move Me"	Allister Ann
2016	"Say So"	Alex Chaloff
2016	"Young in All The Wrong Ways"	Emilie Sabath

=== With Nickel Creek ===
==== Albums ====
- 1993: Little Cowpoke
- 1997: Here to There
- 2000: Nickel Creek
- 2002: This Side
- 2005: Why Should the Fire Die?
- 2014: A Dotted Line
- 2023: Celebrants

==== Compilations ====
- 2006: Reasons Why: The Very Best
- 2007: I'll Fly Away: Country Hymns and Songs of Faith

==== Singles ====
- 2001: "When You Come Back Down"
- 2001: "The Lighthouse's Tale"
- 2002: "Reasons Why"
- 2003: "This Side"
- 2003: "Speak"
- 2003: "Smoothie Song"
- 2005: "When in Rome"
- 2009: "Too Much"

=== With Watkins Family Hour ===
==== Albums ====
- 2015: Watkins Family Hour
- 2020: Brother Sister
- 2022: Vol. II

=== With I'm With Her ===
==== Singles ====
- 2015: "Crossing Muddy Waters" / "Be My Husband"
- 2017: "Little Lies"
- 2017: "Send My Love (to Your New Lover) – [Live – Feat. Paul Kowert]"
- 2019: "Call My Name"

==== Albums ====
- 2018: See You Around
- 2025: Wild And Clear And Blue
