= Why Should the Fire Die? =

Studio album by Nickel Creek
- Released: August 8, 2005
- Recorded: November 2004 – April 2005
- Studios: Barefoot Recording (Los Angeles, California)
- Genre: Progressive bluegrass
- Length: 47:12
- Label: Sugar Hill
- Producers: Eric Valentine and Tony Berg

Nickel Creek chronology
| This Side (2002) | Why Should the Fire Die? (2005) | Reasons Why: The Very Best (2006) |

Why Should The Fire Die? is the third major album release and fifth album overall by progressive acoustic trio Nickel Creek. The album was released on Sugar Hill on August 9, 2005, in the United States, and on August 8 in the United Kingdom. Why Should the Fire Die? is the first Nickel Creek album to feature string bassist Mark Schatz. It would be their last album before their hiatus between 2007 and 2014, after which they released their album A Dotted Line.

The album peaked at No. 17 on the Billboard 200, Nickel Creek's highest position on the chart to date. Why Should the Fire Die? also topped both the magazine's Top Internet Albums and Top Bluegrass Albums charts. By November 2006, the album had sold 258,784 copies. The album earned Nickel Creek two Grammy Award nominations: the award for Best Contemporary Folk Album, an award which they previously won for This Side, and the award for Best Country Instrumental Performance ("Scotch & Chocolate").

Why Should the Fire Die? was praised by contemporary music critics primarily for its creativity, and for its instrumental quality, with one critic complimenting the album's "sheer musical brilliance".

== Conception and production ==
We just met (Eric Valentine) and it clicked and he got what kind of record we wanted to make. The world's a big place. (Alison Krauss) would probably suggest we work with somebody different. There's lots of different people to work with and we have huge ambitions. We want to do something different with every record.

— Sean Watkins, North County Times interview

In the time that Nickel Creek spent writing songs for Why Should the Fire Die?, numerous songs did not make the cut, and only fourteen were used in the final draft of the album. When discussing the album, Sean Watkins said that the band "did so much co-writing together and filtering. I mean there’s like 30 songs that didn’t get used." After writing the songs, Sara Watkins said in her online journal that the trio spent five days "going over the details of the arrangements on each of the seventeen songs we're seriously considering for the record and making good demos of each of them". The band started recording the album in November 2004, and the album was "completed, mixed, and mastered" by April 2005.

The recording for Why Should the Fire Die? took place at Barefoot Recording in Los Angeles, California. In an interview with Rolling Stone, Thile said: "The studio needs to be dark. I don't want to be reminded by my surroundings that what I'm singing about isn't happening right then. I like to really dissolve into the story. But the Jamesons I use more for keeping my vocal cords relaxed and clear."

The release of Why Should the Fire Die? marked the first major Nickel Creek release with Alison Krauss absent as a producer. The album's producing duties were carried out by Tony Berg and former Smash Mouth producer Eric Valentine. Sara Watkins stated in an interview with Paste Magazine that the producer change made for a "more congruent project overall". The band attributed much of the credit for their morphing sound to both their new producers and Krauss. The album was not recorded digitally, but in a more old-fashioned way using Telefunken microphones, and the special effect in the fiddle on the track "First and Last Waltz" was reel tape delay.

== Songs ==
"When in Rome", the opening track on Why Should the Fire Die?, was chosen as the album's only single. The song's title alludes to the American proverb "When in Rome, do as the Romans do", and Chris Thile, the song's author, said "The idea behind the song – and I do love it! - is if there is something better, it's worth leaning towards just a little bit because you'll have a great time here regardless." Critics commented on the song favorably, with George Graham saying that "When in Rome" has "rock energy level and some sonic manipulation, with hints of old-time Appalachian music in the fiddle, while the lyrics are definitely in the rock mode."

I think that Nickel Creek has finally learned to embrace its strengths, and recognize what those strengths are. I think it’s been both a process of realizing what those strengths are and then not being afraid of the strengths which may box us in. You know a song on the new record like "Jealous of the Moon" we might not have considered recording before because it’s a lot like a country song. But it happens to be something that we do well. And we’re no longer afraid that something we do might label us a “bluegrass band” or a “country band” because we’re comfortable enough in our own skin now to just do what feels right and to do what we feel we do well enough to make a contribution to music as a whole.

— Chris Thile, Elixir Strings interview

The second track, "Somebody More Like You" was written by guitarist Sean Watkins. The break-up song, written from Watkins' perspective, was described as "scathing", and like "Aimee Mann-style modern pop", with lyrics like "I hope you meet someone your height so you can see eye to eye/With someone as small as you". Watkins said the song wasn't written for anyone in particular, but said "I had this clever line and decided to build a song around it." "Jealous of the Moon", the third track, was co-written by Chris Thile and Gary Louris of Jayhawks fame. This song was released as a promotional single in the United States. The fourth track and first instrumental on Why Should the Fire Die?, "Scotch & Chocolate", earned Nickel Creek a Grammy Award nomination for Best Country Instrumental. However, the song lost to the trio's former record producer Alison Krauss with her band Union Station for "Unionhouse Branch", from the band's twelfth album, Lonely Runs Both Ways. As with the first three songs on the album, critics responded favorably to "Scotch & Chocolate". Rolling Stone considered the song to be "Celtic-infused", Slant Magazine named it the best song on the album, and Stylus Magazine called it a "brisk, lively instrumental". The latter also said the song was "every bit as physically exciting as Shooter Jennings or Big and Rich."

"Can't Complain", a Chris Thile-composed piece, was the fifth track on Why Should the Fire Die?. According to Sean Watkins, the song was written by Thile "from the point of view of a friend". Unlike the first four songs on the album, the song received mixed reviews. Being There called it "nothing more than a generic ballad with little merit", and PopMatters said that it was a "one-too-many Thile tune about screwed-up relationships". However, some critics found it amazing; Village Voice called the song a "lushly arpeggiated ballad". The sixth track, a Bob Dylan cover, "Tomorrow is a Long Time", was the only track on the album not composed at least partially by one of the members of Nickel Creek. The track had previously been covered by "Watkins Family Hour", a duo that consists of Sara Watkins and Sean Watkins, at their home base of Largo in Los Angeles. Both the album version and the live Watkins Family Hour version feature Sara Watkins as the lead vocalist. Watkins was heavily praised for her "graceful" and "beautifully" sung rendition of the song. "Eveline", a tribute to the James Joyce short story of the same name, was the seventh track on the album. A Thile-Sean Watkins composed piece, "Eveline" has been said to feature "irregular tunings", and vocal harmonization that is similar to that on Radiohead's OK Computer. AllMusic cited this track as the "brooding centerpiece" of the album.

The eighth song and second instrumental on Why Should the Fire Die?, "Stumptown", was written by Chris Thile. The song was written as a tribute to Stumptown Coffee Roasters, Chris Thile's favorite coffee house in the world. "Stumptown" is also the album's shortest song, at one minute and forty three seconds. "Anthony", the ninth track, is the only song recorded by Nickel Creek that was written solely by Sara Watkins. "Anthony", which features a ukulele melody, was described by several critics as "old-timey". One of three Thile-Watkins-Watkins composed pieces on the album, "Best Of Luck" was the tenth track on Why Should the Fire Die?. Sara Watkins had the lead vocal for "Best Of Luck", and was complimented by critics for her "snippy" and "assertive" vocal. prefix Magazine pegged the song as the formula that makes "this album, and trio, unstoppable". The eleventh track, "Doubting Thomas", was written by Chris Thile and is named after Doubting Thomas, a biblical term. All the members of Nickel Creek came from devout Christian families, and the song is about questioning faith. The third and final instrumental, "First and Last Waltz", is Why Should the Fire Die?'s twelfth track. One of the three songs written by all of Nickel Creek's members, it comes before the penultimate track, "Helena". At Nickel Creek's concerts, the song was played as a segue into "Helena". The album recording of "First And Last Waltz" has been called a "chilly effects-draped recital piece", due to its use of sound effects. "Helena", the penultimate track, was written by Chris Thile. Producer Eric Valentine provided drumming duties for this song. Thile described the track as what he considered "the ultimate climax" of Why Should the Fire Die?, and some contemporary critics found the song to be the highlight of the album. The final song on Why Should the Fire Die?, the title track, is a slow waltz. PopMatters described the song as being "gorgeously sung", but "an odd choice to conclude a record that is so often bidding for the true fun of pop music".

== Critical reception ==
Professional ratings
Aggregate scores
| Source | Rating |
|---|---|
| Metacritic | 82/100 |
Review scores
| Source | Rating |
| AllMusic | 4/5 stars |
| BBC | (positive) |
| Entertainment Weekly | A− |
| Harp | (positive) |
| Houston Chronicle | (positive) |
| Robert Christgau | C+ |
| Slant Magazine | 4/5 stars |
| Stylus Magazine | (positive) |
| USA Today | 3/4 stars |
| Village Voice | (positive) |

Why Should the Fire Die? received mostly positive reviews from American contemporary music critics. PopMatters said that the album was "hardly the stuff of mountain music", and Village Voice described it as "much sleeker, sexier, and more carefully assembled than work by the competition." A review from the Houston Chronicle also stated that Why Should the Fire Die? is "like Wilco with country rock and Radiohead with guitar riff rock," and that "the trio has successfully proved the vitality of creative Darwinism." Some critics even went as far as to call the album's musical genre "emo-grass".

The album also received much critical praise for its instrumental strength, with BBC stating that "what shines through immediately is the sheer musical brilliance." The magazine Being There said that "like any good bluegrass band, Nickel Creek proves capable of playing rousing instrumentals." BBC also discussed the difference between the three instrumentals featured on the album, stating ""First And Last Waltz" is smooth and dreamy, "Stumptown" is a merry little jig, and "Scotch And Chocolate" is just reel-y (sic) good."

Reviews for Why Should the Fire Die? also included praise of the album's vocals, particularly Sara Watkins' "snippy", "beautifully sung" and "assertive" vocals on various tracks, and the trio's vocal harmonization was also complimented.

== Track listing ==
| No. | Title | Writer(s) | Length |
|---|---|---|---|
| 1. | "When in Rome" | Chris Thile | 4:14 |
| 2. | "Somebody More Like You" | Sean Watkins | 3:01 |
| 3. | "Jealous of the Moon" | Gary Louris, Chris Thile | 4:41 |
| 4. | "Scotch & Chocolate (instrumental)" | Chris Thile, Sara Watkins | 3:07 |
| 5. | "Can't Complain" | Chris Thile | 5:34 |
| 6. | "Tomorrow Is a Long Time" | Bob Dylan | 3:36 |
| 7. | "Eveline" | Chris Thile, Sean Watkins | 3:11 |
| 8. | "Stumptown (instrumental)" | Chris Thile | 1:43 |
| 9. | "Anthony" | Sara Watkins | 1:55 |
| 10. | "Best of Luck" | Chris Thile, Sean Watkins, Sara Watkins | 3:22 |
| 11. | "Doubting Thomas" | Chris Thile | 3:19 |
| 12. | "First and Last Waltz (instrumental)" | Chris Thile, Sean Watkins, Sara Watkins | 1:53 |
| 13. | "Helena" | Chris Thile | 4:45 |
| 14. | "Why Should the Fire Die?" | Chris Thile, Sean Watkins, Sara Watkins | 2:50 |
| Total length: | | | 47:11 |

== Chart performance ==
| Chart | Peak position |
|---|---|
| U.S. Billboard 200 | 17 |
| U.S. Billboard Top Bluegrass Albums | 1 |
| U.S. Billboard Top Independent Albums | 1 |
| U.S. Billboard Top Internet Albums | 17 |
| UK Country Albums (Official Charts) | 3 |

== Personnel ==
=== Nickel Creek ===
- Chris Thile – mandolin, vocals, mandola, bouzouki, banjo, tenor guitar, stomping
- Sara Watkins – fiddle, vocals, ukulele, stomping
- Sean Watkins – guitars, vocals, piano, bouzouki, stomping

=== Other musicians ===
- Mark Schatz – bass, stomping
- Eric Valentine – drums

== Credits ==
- Producers: Tony Berg, Eric Valentine
- Engineer: Eric Valentine
- Assistant engineer: Chris Roach
- Mixing: Eric Valentine
- Mastering: Eric Valentine
- Creative director: Wendy Stamberger
- Photography: Danny Clinch
- Stylist: Marjan Malakpour
- Assistants: Gary Ashley, Brett Williams
