= Sean Watkins =

American musician (born 1977)

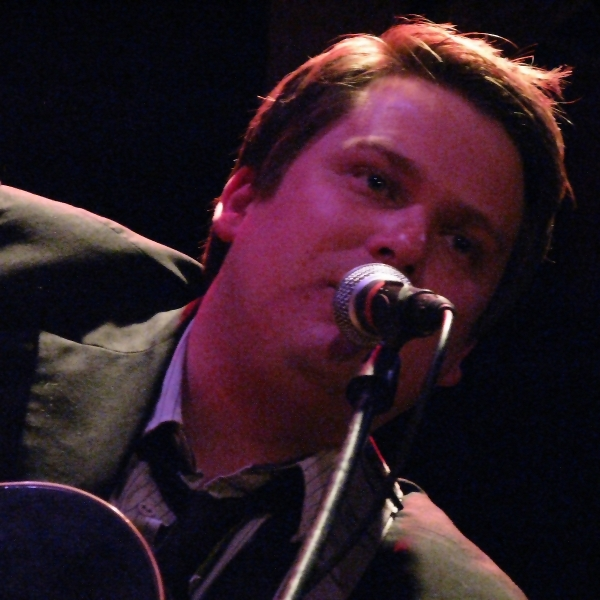
- Watkins performing with Fiction Family at the Bowery Ballroom in 2009

Background information
- Born: Sean Charles Watkins; February 18, 1977 (age 49)
- Origin: Vista, California, U.S.
- Genres: Progressive bluegrass, folk, country
- Occupations: Musician, songwriter
- Instruments: Guitar, piano, mandolin, ukulele, bouzouki
- Years active: 1989–present
- Labels: ATO; Sugar Hill
- Member of: Nickel Creek, Fiction Family, Works Progress Administration, Mutual Admiration Society, Watkins Family Hour
- Website: seanwatkins.com

Sean Charles Watkins (born February 18, 1977) is an American guitarist, vocalist, and songwriter. He is a member of the contemporary folk band Nickel Creek, the duo Fiction Family, the musical collective Watkins Family Hour, and the supergroup Works Progress Administration. He is the brother of Sara Watkins.

== Career ==
=== Nickel Creek ===
Sean Watkins began his tenure with Nickel Creek playing mandolin, but later switched to guitar. The band has released six albums and a CD composed of their hits (called Reasons Why: The Very Best) and won a Grammy for This Side – a coveted trophy that Watkins reportedly put on top of his toilet at home. Explaining the somewhat odd situation, Watkins said that "it seems like a humble place. I didn't want to put it out in plain view of my house. I didn't feel like displaying it right when you walk in. It's a nice crown for the porcelain." In addition to playing with Nickel Creek, Watkins has released multiple solo albums.

As a solo musician, his early material was contemporary bluegrass, but he has since incorporated other influences into his music (especially indie rock.) Watkins' solo music career seems to reflect Nickel Creek's: turning from traditional bluegrass songs to indie rock with bluegrass instrumentation. He is the oldest member of Nickel Creek. Sean qualified for the National Flatpicking Championship in 1993 at age 16.

"My first instrument was the piano when I was six", Sean recalled. "I took classic instruction for seven years, but three years into that I discovered bluegrass music, through my piano teacher's son, who had a bluegrass band that played every Saturday night at a pizza place in Carlsbad. I really got into it, and when Sara and I met Chris [Thile], we started playing with him on Saturday nights too."

His sister Sara Watkins, also a member of Nickel Creek, plays violin and sings background vocals on the two latest of his three solo albums. In 2004, Nickel Creek participated in a project dubbed Mutual Admiration Society, a collaboration with former Toad The Wet Sprocket singer Glen Phillips. Sean and Sara are also part of the 2007 soundtrack for the psychological thriller Bug with the track "No Way to Live".

=== Current projects ===
In 2006, Watkins and Switchfoot frontman Jon Foreman started a collaborating duo called The Real SeanJon. In March 2008, the duo announced that they had changed their band name to Fiction Family. In a spring 2008 interview, Foreman said that the album would have a summer 2008 release and the duo was considering having the album be distributed by Starbucks. However, a September 2008 press release by Nickel Creek confirmed that the album, Fiction Family, is to be released on January 20, 2009, on ATO Records.

In January 2008, it was reported by Billboard that a new supergroup octet tentatively named The Scrolls had formed, now known officially as Works Progress Administration (W.P.A.). The octet is composed of Watkins, his sister Sara Watkins (fiddle), Glen Phillips (guitar, vocals), Benmont Tench (piano), Luke Bulla (fiddle), Greg Leisz (various), Pete Thomas (drums), and Davey Faragher (bass). The group released their self-titled debut album on August 28, 2009. As the group continued, the lead singer-songwriters Watkins (Sean), Phillips, and Bulla were considered the core group and were supported by others when their projects made it possible. Bulla is no longer considered part of the group and as of summer 2011, their most recent lineup was Watkins and Phillips supported by Jerry Roe on drums and Sebastian Steinberg on bass guitar.

Watkins and sister Sara play regularly at the Largo nightclub in Los Angeles as "The Watkins Family Hour". Keyboardist Benmont Tench (of Tom Petty and the Heartbreakers) and bassist Sebastian Steinberg (formerly of Soul Coughing) are regular participants and other guest musicians from the Largo family generally show up as well, including Jon Brion, Fiona Apple, Don Heffington, Greg Leisz, and former Nickel Creek bandmate Chris Thile when he is in town. The irregular collaboration lead to a 2015 album and tour under the same name.

Watkins has also frequently supported his sister Sara on guitar and vocals for her solo dates since the release of her debut album in April 2009.

In addition, Watkins plans to release what he calls "15 minutes of noise" as a digital download on his website. He said that the final product was "very strange", and that there would "be some cool art to go with it".

In October 2013, Watkins announced that he had completed a record entitled All I Do Is Lie, which was released in June 2014.

== Personal life ==
Sean married musician Dominique Arciero on October 19, 2019, in Vista, California. They currently reside in northeast Los Angeles, California.

== Discography ==
=== Solo ===
- Let It Fall (2001)
- 26 Miles (2003)
- Blinders On (2005)
- All I Do Is Lie (2014)
- What to Fear (2016)
- This Is Who We Are (2020) – with The Bee Eaters

=== With Watkins Family Hour ===
==== Albums ====
- Watkins Family Hour (2015)
- Brother Sister (2020)
