= Toad the Wet Sprocket discography =

This is the discography for American alternative rock band Toad the Wet Sprocket.

== Albums ==
=== Studio albums ===
List of albums, with selected chart positions
Title	Album details	Peak chart positions		Certifications (sales threshold)
Title	Album details	US	AUS	Certifications (sales threshold)
Bread & Circus	Release date: 1988; Label: Abe's Records, Columbia reissue; Formats: CD, cassette, vinyl	—	—	
Pale	Release date: January 16, 1990; Label: Columbia; Formats: CD, cassette, vinyl	—	—	
Fear	Release date: August 27, 1991; Label: Columbia; Formats: CD, cassette, vinyl	49	179	RIAA: Platinum
Dulcinea	Release date: May 24, 1994; Label: Columbia; Formats: CD, cassette, vinyl	34	145	RIAA: Platinum
Coil	Release date: May 20, 1997; Label: Columbia; Formats: CD, cassette, Minidisc	19	199	
New Constellation	Release date: October 15, 2013; Label: Abe's; Formats: CD, vinyl	97	—	
Starting Now	Release date: August 27, 2021; Label: Abe's; Formats: CD, vinyl	—	—	
Rings: The Acoustic Sessions	Release date: January 27, 2026; Label: Abe's; Formats: digital, CD, vinyl			
"—" denotes releases that did not chart

=== Compilation albums ===
Title	Details	US	Certifications (sales threshold)
Seven Songs Seldom Seen	Release date: 1992; Label: SME; Formats: VHS	—	
In Light Syrup	Release date: 1995; Label: Columbia; Formats: CD	37	RIAA: Gold
House of Toad 1989-1997	Release date: 1997; Label: Columbia; Formats: CD	—	
P.S. (A Toad Retrospective)	Release date: 1999; Label: Columbia; Formats: CD	—	
All You Want	Release date: 2011; Label: Abe's Records; Formats: CD, digital	—	
"—" denotes releases that did not chart

=== Live albums and EPs ===
Title	Details
Five Live	Release date: 1992; Label: Columbia; Formats: CD
Acoustic Dance Party	Release date: 1994; Label: Columbia; Formats: CD
Welcome Home	Release date: 2004; Label: Columbia; Formats: CD
5 Live (2)	Release date: December 2012; Label: Self-released; Formats: Digital
Live in the West	Release date: October 2, 2013; Label: Self-released; Formats: Digital
In the Round at Revolver	Release date: October 8, 2013; Label: Self-released; Formats: Digital
Architect of the Ruin	Release date: June 16, 2015; Label: Self-released; Formats: Digital

== Singles ==
Year	Single	Peak chart positions					Album
Year	Single	US	US Pop	US Mod.	US Main.	AUS	Album
1989	"One Little Girl"	—	—	24	—	—	Bread & Circus
1990	"Come Back Down"	—	—	27	—	—	Pale
1990	"Jam"	—	—	—	—	—	Pale
1991	"Is It for Me"	—	—	—	—	—	Fear
1992	"All I Want"	15	4	22	22	99	Fear
1992	"Hold Her Down"	—	—	—	—	—	Fear
1992	"Walk on the Ocean"	18	10	—	27	152	Fear
1993	"I Will Not Take These Things for Granted"	—	—	—	—	—	Fear
1994	"Fall Down"	33	24	1	5	125	Dulcinea
1994	"Something's Always Wrong"	41	14	9	22	—	Dulcinea
1995	"Fly from Heaven"	—	—	—	—	—	Dulcinea
1995	"Stupid"	—	—	—	—	—	Dulcinea
1995	"Good Intentions"	—	16	20	19	—	Friends soundtrack / In Light Syrup
1997	"Come Down"	—	—	13	17	—	Coil
1997	"Whatever I Fear"	—	—	—	—	—	Coil
1997	"Crazy Life"	—	—	—	—	—	Coil
1999	"P.S."	—	—	—	—	—	P.S. (A Toad Retrospective)
2013	"New Constellation"	—	—	—	—	—	New Constellation
2014	"The Moment"	—	—	—	—	—	New Constellation
2014	"California Wasted"	—	—	—	—	—	New Constellation
2015	"Architect of the Ruin"	—	—	—	—	—	Architect of the Ruin
2021	"Hold On"	—	—	—	—	—	Starting Now
2021	"Starting Now"	—	—	—	—	—	Starting Now
2021	"Transient Whales"	—	—	—	—	—	Starting Now
"—" denotes singles that did not chart.

== Other appearances ==
Year	Song	Album
2018	"Nothing Can Stop My Love"	King of the Road: A Tribute to Roger Miller
