= P.S. (A Toad Retrospective) =

1999 compilation album by Toad the Wet Sprocket

Compilation album by Toad the Wet Sprocket
- Released: October 26, 1999
- Recorded: Between 1986 and 1997, at various locations
- Genre: Alternative rock
- Length: 56:42
- Label: Columbia
- Producer: Various

Toad the Wet Sprocket chronology
Coil (1997)	P.S. (A Toad Retrospective) (1999)	Welcome Home (2004)

Professional ratings
Review scores
Source	Rating
Allmusic	4/5 stars

P.S. (A Toad Retrospective) is a compilation by American alternative rock band Toad the Wet Sprocket. Released in 1999, it was a posthumous look back at their career featuring hits and fan favorites. Although the band had officially split up prior to this release, Glen Phillips, Dean Dinning and Randy Guss reunited to record a new version of "P.S.", one of Toad's earliest songs. In addition, Phillips, Dinning, and Guss wrote and recorded an entirely new song titled "Eyes Open Wide", without the participation of Todd Nichols, who felt some of the remaining unrecorded studio outtakes the band had would be better to release than a new song. Rob Taylor, who at the time was the lead guitar player in the band Lapdog, with Nichols and Dinning, is credited as playing "additional guitar" on the track.

== Track listing ==
No.	Title	Length
1.	"P.S. (New Version)" (previously unreleased)	3:43
2.	"Come Down" (Coil)	3:13
3.	"All I Want" (Remix, fear)	3:15
4.	"Something's Always Wrong" (Edit, Dulcinea)	3:59
5.	"Good Intentions" (In Light Syrup)	3:25
6.	"Crazy Life" (Coil)	4:00
7.	"Come Back Down" (Pale)	3:18
8.	"Walk on the Ocean" (fear)	2:59
9.	"Fall Down" (Dulcinea)	3:23
10.	"I Will Not Take These Things for Granted" (fear)	5:46
11.	"Way Away" (Bread & Circus)	3:05
12.	"Jam" (1990 Radio/Video version, original appears on Pale)	3:16
13.	"Hold Her Down" (Remix, fear)	3:05
14.	"Whatever I Fear" (Coil)	2:58
15.	"Eyes Open Wide" (previously unreleased)	3:13
16.	"Silo Lullaby" (Coil Japan Bonus Track, Hidden US Multimedia File)	4:04
