= Acoustic Dance Party =

1994 album by Toad the Wet Sprocket

EP by Toad the Wet Sprocket
- Released: December 13, 1994
- Recorded: Track 1: Area 52 in Santa Barbara, California, October 4, 1993; Tracks 2–5: Live at Catspaw Studios in Atlanta, Georgia, June 23, 1994, for WNNX
- Genre: Acoustic rock
- Length: 17:05
- Label: Columbia
- Producer: Toad the Wet Sprocket

Toad the Wet Sprocket chronology
Dulcinea (1994)	Acoustic Dance Party (1994)	In Light Syrup (1995)

Professional ratings
Review scores
Source	Rating
AllMusic	3/5 stars

Acoustic Dance Party is an extended play (EP) album by Toad the Wet Sprocket recorded and released in 1994. It contains acoustic versions of some of their most popular songs.

== Recording ==
The liner notes tells the story about the recording of "Something's Always Wrong" that appears on this EP.

It's a good thing we decided to record acoustically because the day before the session our rehearsal space had been broken into and all our gear was stolen. So with borrowed guitars and shakers, and a lot of help from our friend, Bruce Winter, we proceeded. The recording was punctuated by the filling out of police reports and dusting for fingerprints, all of which added an ironic element in light of the song's lyrical content.

The additional tracks were recorded before a small private audience. It is rumored that the album as a whole was produced to make up for an in-store appearance in Schaumburg, Illinois, that was canceled by the city's mayor.

== Track listing ==
1. "Something's Always Wrong" (Glen Phillips, Todd Nichols) – 3:28
2. "Stupid" (Phillips) – 3:16
3. "Nanci" (Phillips) – 3:16
4. "Walk on the Ocean" (Phillips, Nichols) – 2:59
5. "Fall Down" (Phillips, Nichols) – 4:07
