= Welcome Home: Live at the Arlington Theatre, Santa Barbara 1992 =

1992 live album by Toad the Wet Sprocket

Live album by Toad the Wet Sprocket
- Released: October 19, 2004
- Recorded: 1992
- Genre: Alternative rock
- Length: 74:19
- Label: Columbia
- Producer: Steven Miller and Glen Phillips

Toad the Wet Sprocket chronology
P.S. (A Toad Retrospective) (1999)	Welcome Home: Live at the Arlington Theatre, Santa Barbara 1992 (2004)	New Constellation (2013)

Professional ratings
Review scores
Source	Rating
Allmusic	3.5/5 stars

Welcome Home: Live at the Arlington Theatre, Santa Barbara 1992 is a live album by alternative rock group Toad the Wet Sprocket. Released by Columbia Records in 2004, it followed up the band's reunion tour in 2003, and is a chronicle of their first show in Santa Barbara, California following the success of their tour behind the platinum album fear.

== Track listing ==
All songs written by Toad the Wet Sprocket.

1. "Walk on the Ocean" – 3:17
2. "One Little Girl" – 3:42
3. "Scenes from a Vinyl Recliner" – 4:26
4. "All I Want" – 3:06
5. "Jam" – 3:16
6. "Before You Were Born" – 3:27
7. "Butterflies" – 4:49
  - Closing interpolation of "Within You Without You" (The Beatles)
8. "Torn" – 3:06
9. "Chile" – 4:40
10. "Nightingale Song" – 2:35
11. "Brother" – 4:10
12. "Hold Her Down" – 3:12
13. "Come Back Down" – 3:05
14. "Stories I Tell" – 5:03
15. "Know Me" – 6:09
  - Opening interpolation of "Spirit" (Mike Scott)
  - Closing interpolation of "Unsatisfied" (The Replacements)
16. "Way Away" – 3:21
17. "Is It for Me" – 3:39
18. "Fall Down" – 3:43
19. "I Will Not Take These Things for Granted" – 5:33
