= Jonathan Kingham =

American musician

Jonathan Kingham is a folk, pop and jazz musician from Nashville, TN. He was born in Woodland, California and graduated from Woodland Senior High School in 1992. Kingham has released three full-length albums, one EP, and appeared on Meet The Bixbys as a band member for The Bixbys in 1999. Since 1997, he has toured nationally. His vocal work has been featured in The WB network's television seriesFelicity. Kingham is among a group of Seattle artists whose music is featured when a person calling the City of Seattle is put on hold. He is currently playing keyboards and slide guitar with Toad the Wet Sprocket, supporting the release of New Constellation, and tours extensively with the band's lead singer, Glen Phillips, in his solo shows. Kingham also teaches songwriting workshops with students all over the country with Ryan Shea Smith with a program called "Songwriting Made Simple".

Kingham also writes for other artists, produces albums for other artists and has songs featured in numerous music library catalogues.

== Discography ==
- Jonathan Kingham (CD) - 1997
- Hardwood Floors (CD) - Exact Records - 1999 (Exact 001)
- That Changes Everything (CD) - Exact Records - 2005 (Exact 005)
- Smooth Out the Lines (CD/MP3) - Exact Records - 2010

== Awards ==
- 1st place honors in the National Telluride Troubadour Songwriting Contest
- 1st place at The Unisong International Song Contest
- Placed two years in a row in the top five of the John Lennon Songwriting Contest
- 1st Place award in the USA Songwriting Competition in the Folk Category
- Overall Grand Prize winner USA Songwriting Competition
