= Five Live (disambiguation) =

Five Live may refer to:

- Five Live (George Michael and Queen EP)
- Five Live (Toad the Wet Sprocket EP)
- BBC Radio 5 Live, a radio station
