= Comedown =

Comedown or Come Down may refer to:

- Comedown (drugs), the aftereffects of stimulant use
- Comedown (film), a 2012 film starring Adam Deacon
- "Comedown" (Bush song), 1995
- "Comedown", a song by Ili, 2020
- "Come Down", a song by Toad the Wet Sprocket, 1997
- "Comedown", a song by Luke Hemmings from When Facing The Things We Turn Away From, 2021
- "Comedown", a song by Henry Moodie, 2025
- "Come Down", a song by Atreyu from The Beautiful Dark of Life, 2023
- "Come Down", a song by Nebula from To the Center, 1999
- "Come Down", a song by WSTRN, 2016
- "The Comedown", a song by Bring Me the Horizon from Suicide Season, 2008
- "The Comedown", a song by Hadouken! from Every Weekend, 2013

== See also ==
- ...The Dandy Warhols Come Down, a 1997 album by The Dandy Warhols
