= Mutual Admiration Society (album) =

2004 album by Mutual Admiration Society

Studio album by Mutual Admiration Society
- Released: July 13, 2004
- Recorded: December 2000
- Genres: Folk, Bluegrass
- Length: 41:02
- Label: Sugar Hill Records
- Producer: Ethan Johns

Professional ratings
Review scores
Source	Rating
Allmusic	(?)
PopMatters	(positive)

Mutual Admiration Society is an album featuring the collaboration between Nickel Creek's Chris Thile, Sara Watkins, and Sean Watkins, and Glen Phillips, the lead singer of alternative-rock group Toad the Wet Sprocket. It was recorded in three days in December 2000, but took 3½ years to be released.

== Track listing ==
1. "Comes a Time" (Phillips) – 4:07
2. "Sake of the World" (Jon Brion, Phillips) – 2:41
3. "Windmills" (Dean Dinning, Randy Guss, Todd Nichols, Phillips) – 4:30
4. "Be Careful" (Phillips) – 3:57
5. "Running Out" (Phillips) – 1:56
6. "Somewhere Out There" (Phillips) – 4:21
7. "Francesca" (Phillips) – 3:20
8. "Trouble" (Brion, Jeff McGregor) – 3:36
9. "La Lune" (Sean Kennedy) – 4:18
10. "Reprise" (Sean Kennedy) – 2:05
11. "Think About Your Troubles" (Harry Nilsson) – 6:11

== Personnel ==
=== Musical ===
- Chris Thile – Mandolin, Vocals, Group Member
- Sara Watkins – Fiddle, Vocals, Group Member
- Sean Watkins – Guitar, Mandolin, Vocals, Group Member
- Glen Phillips – Vocals, Group Member
- Ethan Johns – Mandolin, Percussion, Guitar (Electric), Vocals (background), Producer, Engineer, Mixing
- Richard Causon – Piano, Accordion, Organ (Hammond)
- Jennifer Condos – Bass

=== Technical ===
- Robert Hadley – Mastering
- Nickel Creek – Creative Director
- Glen Rose – Photography
- Doug Sax – Mastering
- Wendy Stamberger – Design, Creative Director

== Chart listings ==
Chart	Provider(s)	Peak position	Certification	Sales/ shipments
Billboard Top Heatseekers (U.S.)	Billboard	31	Not certified	
Billboard Top Independent Albums (U.S.)	Billboard	22	Not certified	
Billboard Top Internet Albums (U.S.)	Billboard	283	Not certified	
