= Come Down =

1997 single by Toad the Wet Sprocket

Single by Toad the Wet Sprocket

from the album Coil
- Released: April 1997
- Studio: Master Control (Los Angeles); Gopher Sound (Santa Barbara, California)
- Length: 3:13
- Label: Columbia
- Composers: Glen Phillips; Todd Nichols; Toad the Wet Sprocket
- Lyricists: Glen Phillips; Todd Nichols
- Producers: Gavin MacKillop; Toad the Wet Sprocket

Toad the Wet Sprocket singles chronology
"Good Intentions" (1995)	"Come Down" (1997)	"Whatever I Fear" (1997)

"Come Down" is a song by American alternative rock band Toad the Wet Sprocket, released as the first single from their fifth studio album, Coil (1997), in April 1997. The song peaked at number 51 on the US Billboard Hot 100 Airplay chart and number 38 on the Canadian RPM 100 Hit Tracks chart.

== Track listing ==
European CD single

1. "Come Down" (album version) – 3:13
2. "Fall Down" (live) – 3:25
3. "Something's Always Wrong" (live) – 4:37
4. "Woodburning" (live) – 4:23

== Credits and personnel ==
Credits are adapted from the Coil liner notes.

Studios

- Recorded at Master Control (Los Angeles) and Gopher Sound (Santa Barbara, California)
- Mixed at South Beach Studios (Miami Beach, Florida)
- Mastered at Precision Mastering (Los Angeles)

Personnel

- Toad the Wet Sprocket – music, production
  - Glen Phillips – music, lyrics, vocals, guitar
  - Todd Nichols – music, lyrics, guitar, vocals
  - Dean Dinning – bass, vocals, keyboards
  - Randy Guss – drums
- Gavin MacKillop – production, recording
- Carrie McConkey – production coordination
- Jeff Robinson – recording assistance
- Tom Lord-Alge – mixing
- Femio Hernandez – mixing assistance
- Stephen Marcussen – mastering

== Charts ==
=== Weekly charts ===
Chart (1997)	Peak position
Canada Top Singles (RPM)	38
Canada Rock/Alternative (RPM)	6
US Hot 100 Airplay (Billboard)	51
US Adult Top 40 (Billboard)	35
US Mainstream Rock Tracks (Billboard)	17
US Modern Rock Tracks (Billboard)	13
US Triple-A (Billboard)	2

=== Year-end charts ===
Chart (1997)	Position
US Mainstream Rock Tracks (Billboard)	88
US Modern Rock Tracks (Billboard)	65
US Triple-A (Billboard)	19
