= Abulum =

Studio album by Glen Phillips
- Released: April 21, 2001
- Genre: Alternative rock
- Length: 45:37
- Label: PMRC, Brick Red Records
- Producer: Ethan Johns, Leo Rossi, John Trickett

Glen Phillips chronology
Abulum (2001)	Live at Largo (2003)

Professional ratings
Review scores
Source	Rating
Allmusic	3/5 stars

Abulum is the solo debut album by Toad the Wet Sprocket singer/songwriter Glen Phillips. The album was produced on both CD and DVD formats. The DVD features the bonus track "Sleep of the Blessed".

== Track listing ==
All songs written by Glen Phillips, except where noted otherwise.

1. "Careless" – 3:28
2. "Men Just Leave" – 3:08
3. "Back On My Feet" (Craig Northey, Glen Phillips) – 3:13
4. "Fred Meyers" – 3:15
5. "My Own Town" – 4:45
6. "It Takes Time" – 3:21
7. "Drive By" – 2:59
8. "Darkest Hour" – 4:09
9. "Professional Victim" – 4:16
10. "Train Wreck" – 5:14
11. "Maya" – 3:35
12. "Sleep of the Blessed" (Bonus track on DVD) – 4:14

== Personnel ==
- Glen Phillips – guitar, vocals
- Richard Causon – accordion, keyboards [chamberlin], piano, Wurlitzer organ
- Jennifer Condos – bass
- Sandy Chila – drums, Wurlitzer organ, nass synthesizer, percussion, strings
- Ethan Johns – guitar, harmony vocals, tambourine, percussion [shaker], mellotron, drums, keyboards [chamberlin], percussion
