= Starting Now (Toad the Wet Sprocket album) =

Studio album by Toad the Wet Sprocket
- Released: August 27, 2021
- Recorded: Late 2019, early 2020
- Genre: Alternative rock
- Length: 36:38
- Language: English
- Label: Abe's Records, The SRG/ILS Group
- Producer: Mikal Blue

Toad the Wet Sprocket chronology
Toad the Wet Sprocket Box Set (2018)	Starting Now (2021)

Starting Now is the seventh studio album by American alternative rock band Toad the Wet Sprocket released on August 27, 2021 (exactly 30 years since the release of Fear) through Abe’s Records. This is the first album since the departure of longtime drummer Randy Guss in 2020.

The album started with vocalist Glen Phillips writing material that he thought would not fit a solo album and as his bandmates recorded versions of some of this music, he became convinced to make a studio album with them. Recording was interrupted by the COVID-19 pandemic and the musicians continued piecing together tracks over email, also including guest musicians such as rhythm and blues vocalist Michael McDonald. The songwriting goes back several years and discusses Phillips' spiritual journey and personal life.

== Track listing ==
All songs written by Glen Phillips, except where noted.

1. "Game Day" – 3:44
2. "Transient Whales" – 3:32
3. "The Best of Me" – 3:22
4. "Starting Now" – 3:47
5. "In the Lantern Light" – 3:55
6. "Hold On" (includes lyrics from "The New Colossus" by Emma Lazarus) – 2:44
7. "Truth" (includes excerpt from "Oration in Memory of Abraham Lincoln" by Frederick Douglass) – 2:51
8. "Slowing Down" (Phillips and Mando Saenz) – 3:40
9. "Dual Citizen" – 3:49
10. "Fever" – 5:13

== Personnel ==
Toad the Wet Sprocket

- Dean Dinning – bass guitar, keyboards, percussion, backing vocals
- Josh Daubin – drums
- Glen Phillips – vocals, rhythm guitar, keyboards, mixing on "Dual Citizen"
- Todd Nichols – lead guitar, backing vocals

Additional personnel

- Mikal Blue – recording, mixing (except on "Dual Citizen"), production
- Eric Boulanger – engineering, mastering
- Daphne Chen – violin
- Richard Dodd – cello
- Eric Gorfain – strings, violin, arrangement
- Elyse Grossman – backing vocals on "Game Day"
- Leah Katz – viola
- Jonathan Kingham – piano on "Truth"
- Jeremy Lawton – organ on "Truth"
- Brody Lowe – artwork
- Michael McDonald – vocals on "The Best of Me"
- Chris Pelonis – backing vocals on "The Best of Me"
- Sophia Phillips – backing vocals on "Game Day"
- The Section Quartet – strings

== See also ==
- List of 2021 albums
