= Good Intentions (Toad the Wet Sprocket song) =

1995 single by Toad the Wet Sprocket

- Artwork of the sticker issued with the song's promo disc

Single by Toad the Wet Sprocket

from the album In Light Syrup and Friends Original TV Soundtrack
- Released: September 19, 1995
- Genre: Alternative rock
- Length: 3:25
- Label: Columbia
- Songwriter: Glen Phillips
- Producer: Gavin MacKillop

Toad the Wet Sprocket singles chronology
"Stupid" (1995)	"Good Intentions" (1995)	"Come Down" (1997)

"Good Intentions" is a song by American alternative rock band Toad the Wet Sprocket. It is included on both the band's 1995 album In Light Syrup and the television series Friends soundtrack, Friends Original TV Soundtrack. This version was recorded in January 1991 during the sessions for the band's third album, fear, but was not included since they felt it was too catchy and sounded like an obvious "hit single". Serviced to radio in September 1995, the song reached number 23 on the US Billboard Hot 100 Airplay chart, number eight in Canada, and number 28 in Iceland.

== Background ==
Singer Glen Phillips said the song was about "General misunderstandings. Operating on the edge of 'moral okayness' as a young person. Flirting or something. ... I think it was about that, like pushing those edges and everybody trying to figure out where they stand in a relationship that way."

== Charts ==
=== Weekly charts ===
Chart (1995–1996)	Peak position
Canada Top Singles (RPM)	8
Canada Adult Contemporary (RPM)	13
Iceland (Íslenski Listinn Topp 40)	28
US Hot 100 Airplay (Billboard)	23
US Adult Contemporary (Billboard)	19
US Adult Top 40 (Billboard)	17
US Album Rock Tracks (Billboard)	19
US Modern Rock Tracks (Billboard)	20
US Top 40/Mainstream (Billboard)	16
US Adult Alternative Top 30 Tracks (Radio & Records)	1

=== Year-end charts ===
Chart (1995)	Position
Canada Adult Contemporary (RPM)	89

Chart (1996)	Position
Canada Top Singles (RPM)	72
US Adult Contemporary (Billboard)	38
US Top 40/Mainstream (Billboard)	53
