= New Constellation =

2013 album by Toad the Wet Sprocket

Studio album by Toad the Wet Sprocket
- Released: October 15, 2013
- Recorded: December 2012 – March 2013
- Genre: Alternative rock
- Length: 45:10
- Label: Abe's Records
- Producer: Mikal Blue

Toad the Wet Sprocket chronology
Welcome Home: Live at the Arlington Theatre, Santa Barbara 1992 (2004)	New Constellation (2013)	Architect of the Ruin (EP) (2015)

Singles from New Constellation
- 1. "New Constellation" Released: June 5, 2013; 2. "The Moment" Released: January 6, 2014; 3. "California Wasted" Released: August 18, 2014

New Constellation is the sixth studio album by American alternative rock band Toad the Wet Sprocket, released October 15, 2013, through Abe's Records. It was available on CD, vinyl and as a digital download. Financed with more than $250,000 from approximately 6,300 contributors on the crowdfunding website Kickstarter, it was their first full-length studio release since the band's 1997 album Coil. This marks the final album with longtime drummer Randy Guss, who had been with the band since its formation in 1986, before his departure in 2020.

== Background and recording ==
Following the band's official breakup in 1998 the members played numerous shows and released several albums, including a compilation of hits and fan favorites in 1999 (P.S. (A Toad Retrospective)), a live album in 2004 (Welcome Home: Live at the Arlington Theatre, Santa Barbara 1992) and a greatest hits album in 2011 (All You Want). The band recorded two new studio tracks for P.S. (A Toad Retrospective) and a Christmas song originally performed by Sam Phillips titled "It Doesn't Feel Like Christmas" in 2011.

In an interview with Yahoo Music published on July 29, 2014, singer/guitarist Glen Phillips described the one-off shows and the time period around them:

Three to four years ago, it started feeling like fun again. We started enjoying each other’s company and remembered what made it good and we kind of got out of our own inter-personal dramas a little bit. At some point, it felt like it would be a good idea to make another record, to actually enjoy each other’s company and make some good art again.

On March 22, 2013, it was announced on the band's Facebook page that the recording process of their new album was finished. The album was produced, engineered and mixed by Mikal Blue at Revolver Studios in Thousand Oaks, California

== Funding ==
To fund the album, the band decided to use the crowdfunding source Kickstarter with hopes of raising $50,000 within a few months. The goal was reached in just 20 hours and eventually surpassed $250,000.

== Release ==
On June 29, 2013, the full album (known as the Advance Digital Download Deluxe Edition) was made available as a download to contributors of the Kickstarter campaign. The band put together several bundles of the release based on the amount pledged. Some packages included signed copies, limited editions and even personal appearances.

The physical and retail digital release came October 15, 2013, through the band's independent record label, Abe's Records.

== Critical reception ==
Professional ratings
Review scores
Source	Rating
AllMusic	3.5/5 stars
PopMatters	6/10
WhatCulture!	4/5 stars

New Constellation received mostly positive feedback from music critics. Michael Perone of WhatCulture! describes the album's tracks as having "a sunny pop sheen reminiscent of their home state’s weather," and that "it’s difficult to get any of the melodies out of your head." Fred Thomas of AllMusic writes, "Older, wiser, and with a newfound hopefulness that wasn't there in their younger days, Toad deliver an uncluttered and thoughtful next step of their ongoing songcraft."

== Track listing ==
All tracks are written by Toad the Wet Sprocket.

No.	Title	Length
1.	"New Constellation"	3:19
2.	"California Wasted"	3:50
3.	"The Moment"	4:06
4.	"Rare Bird"	4:22
5.	"I'll Bet On You"	3:46
6.	"Golden Age"	4:40
7.	"Get What You Want"	3:20
8.	"Is There Anyone Out There"	3:45
9.	"Life Is Beautiful"	3:22
10.	"The Eye"	4:28
11.	"Enough"	6:05
Total length:		45:10

Advance Digital Download Deluxe Edition and European CD
No.	Title	Length
12.	"Friendly Fire"	4:02
13.	"Last to Fall"	3:38
14.	"I'm Not Waiting"	3:11
15.	"Finally Fading"	3:04
Total length:		59:03

== Charts ==
New Constellation debuted at No. 97 on the Billboard 200 chart, selling 4,000 copies in its first week of release.

Chart (2013)	Peak position
U.S. Billboard 200	97
U.S. Independent Albums	23
U.S. Alternative Albums	24
U.S. Rock Albums	35

== Personnel ==
Credits adapted from AllMusic

Toad the Wet Sprocket

- Dean Dinning – bass, engineer, acoustic guitar, keyboards, backing vocals
- Randy Guss – drums, percussion
- Todd Nichols – engineer, lead guitar, backing vocals
- Glen Phillips – lead vocals, engineer, rhythm guitar, keyboards, ukulele

Other musicians

- Mikal Blue – keyboards, ukulele
- Zac Rae – keyboards
- Billy Hawn – percussion
- Greg Leisz – lap steel guitar, pedal steel guitar

Technical personnel

- Andrew Williams – string arrangements
- Mikal Blue – engineer, mixing, production
- Jon Marinos – engineer
- Eric Boulanger – mastering
- Doug Sax – mastering
- Kii Arens – design
- Ben Ciccati – illustrations
- Rob Shanahan – photography
