= In Light Syrup =

1995 compilation album by Toad the Wet Sprocket

Compilation album by Toad the Wet Sprocket
- Released: October 31, 1995
- Genre: Folk rock
- Length: 47:06
- Label: Columbia
- Producer: Gavin MacKillop, Marvin Etzioni, Toad the Wet Sprocket

Toad the Wet Sprocket chronology
Acoustic Dance Party (1994)	In Light Syrup (1995)	Coil (1997)

Singles from In Light Syrup
- 1. "Good Intentions" Released: September 19, 1995

Professional ratings
Review scores
Source	Rating
AllMusic	2.5/5 stars
Classic Rock	7/10 stars

In Light Syrup is an album of B-sides and rare tracks by American alternative rock band Toad the Wet Sprocket, released in 1995. In Light Syrup was RIAA Certified Gold on June 4, 2001. This album includes the hit single "Good Intentions".

== Track listing ==
No.	Title	Writer(s)	Length
1.	"Brother" (from So I Married an Axe Murderer soundtrack, 1993)	Glen Phillips	4:04
2.	"Little Heaven" (from Buffy the Vampire Slayer soundtrack, 1992)	Todd Nichols, Phillips	4:27
3.	"Good Intentions" (from Friends Original TV Soundtrack, 1995)	Phillips	3:25
4.	"Hobbit on the Rocks" (from Rock N' Roll Party All Night, Volume II promo, 1992)	Phillips	3:38
5.	"Are We Afraid" (from Rock N' Roll Party All Night, Volume II promo, 1992)	Phillips	3:35
6.	"So Alive" ("I Will Not Take These Things for Granted" single b-side, 1993)	Nichols, Phillips	4:27
7.	"All in All" ("Walk on the Ocean" single b-side, 1991)	Nichols, Phillips	4:13
8.	"All Right" ("Fall Down" single b-side, 1994)	Nichols, Phillips	5:46
9.	"Janitor" (previously unreleased)	Toad the Wet Sprocket	2:48
10.	"Chicken" (from Rock N' Roll Party All Night, Volume III promo, 1994)	Toad	3:13
11.	"Hope" (Dulcinea international bonus track, 1994)	Nichols, Phillips	3:37
12.	"All She Said" ("All I Want" single b-side, 1992)	Toad	3:53
