= Swallowed by the New =

Studio album by Glen Phillips
- Released: October 7, 2016
- Recorded: 2016
- Genre: Singer-songwriter, folk rock
- Label: Umami Music, Compass Records (2018 re-release)
- Producer: Paul Bryan

Glen Phillips chronology
Mr. Lemons (2006)	Swallowed by the New (2016)

Swallowed by the New is the ninth studio album (and fourth on a record label) released in 2016 by Glen Phillips. The album spawned three singles: "Amnesty," "Leaving Oldtown," and "Go". This album was inspired by Phillips' divorce and the aftermath of it. A deluxe edition with a new track was released on May 4, 2018, by Compass Records.

== Track listing ==
All songs written by Glen Phillips, except where noted.

1. "Go" (Phillips, Kris Orlowski) – 4:16
2. "Baptistina" – 3:22
3. "Criminal Career" – 4:03
4. "Leaving Oldtown" – 3:26
5. "The Easy Ones" – 3:47
6. "Amnesty" (Phillips, Ben Glover) – 3:54
7. "Grief and Praise" – 3:30
8. "Unwritten" – 3:16
9. "There's Always More" (Phillips, Neilson Hubbard, Amber Rubarth) – 3:11
10. "Held Up" – 3:31
11. "Reconstructing the Diary" – 1:36
12. "Nobody's Gonna Get Hurt"* – 4:07

– * (Only included on the 2018 re-release)

== Personnel ==
- Glen Phillips – vocals, acoustic guitar
- Jebin Bruni – keyboards
- Chris Bruce – guitars
- Paul Bryan – bass, string arrangements
- Jay Bellerose – drums
- Richard Dodd – cello
- Leah Katz – viola
- Daphne Chen – violin
- Eric Gorfain – violin, concertmaster
- Ruby Amanfu – vocals (2, 6, 7, 10)
- Freya Phillips – vocals (5)
- Amber Rubarth – vocals (9)

=== Production ===
- Paul Bryan – producer, engineer
- Pete Min – mixing
- Kim Rosen – mastering at Knack Mastering (Ringwood, New Jersey)
- Sean Mccue – design
- Glen Phillips – photography
