= Mr. Lemons =

Studio album by Glen Phillips
- Released: May 2, 2006
- Recorded: Mister Lemons, Nashville, TN
- Genre: Alternative rock
- Length: 39:55
- Label: Umami/bigHelium
- Producer: Neilson Hubbard

Glen Phillips chronology
Unlucky 7 (2006)	Mr. Lemons (2006)	Swallowed By the New (2016)

Professional ratings
Review scores
Source	Rating
Allmusic	3.5/5 stars

Mr. Lemons is the third full-length album by singer/songwriter Glen Phillips. It was released in May 2006 and features a cover of the Huey Lewis and the News hit, "I Want a New Drug".

To promote the album, the first 1700 pre-orders from the Aware Records online store were autographed by Phillips. Artwork for the album was done by Phillips' wife, Laurel.

== Track listing ==
All songs written by Glen Phillips, except where noted.

1. "Everything But You" (Phillips, Neilson Hubbard) – 3:32
2. "Blind Sight" – 3:49
3. "Thank You" – 4:12
4. "I Still Love You" – 4:00
5. "Last Sunset" (Phillips, Kim Richey) – 3:13
6. "I Want a New Drug" (Huey Lewis, Chris Hayes) – 3:18
7. "Marigolds" – 2:29
8. "Waiting" (Phillips, Hubbard) – 3:21
9. "Didn't Think You Cared" – 2:29
10. "The Next Day" – 4:11
11. "A Joyful Noise" – 5:21

== Personnel ==
- Glen Phillips – vocals, keyboards, guitars, percussion
- Ian Fitchuk – keyboards
- Neilson Hubbard – keyboards, percussion, glockenspiel
- Tyler Burkum – electric guitars
- Lex Price – bouzouki, mandolin
- Kenny Huston – pedal steel guitar
- Adam Bender – bass
- Aaron Sands – electric bass, upright bass
- Akil Thompson – bass
- Marco Giovino – drums, percussion
- Chris Carmichael – strings
- Kim Richey – backing vocals
- Cameron Starr – backing vocals
- Kate York – backing vocals

=== Production ===
- Neilson Hubbard – producer
- Andy Hunt – engineer, mixing
- Robinson Eikenberry – mixing
- Glen Phillips – mixing
- Ed (Santa Barbara, California) – mixing location
- Laurel Phillips – artwork
