= Pale (album) =

Studio album by Toad the Wet Sprocket
- Released: January 16, 1990
- Recorded: 1989, Paul & Mike's Recording Studio, Los Angeles, CA
- Genre: Alternative rock
- Length: 38:56
- Label: Columbia
- Producer: Marvin Etzioni

Toad the Wet Sprocket chronology
Bread & Circus (1989)	Pale (1990)	Fear (1991)

Singles from Pale
- 1. "Come Back Down" Released: 1990; 2. "Jam" Released: 1990

Professional ratings
Review scores
Source	Rating
Allmusic	4.5/5 stars

Pale is the second album by American alternative rock band Toad the Wet Sprocket. It was recorded independently in 1989 for roughly $6000. During the recording of Pale, the band signed with Columbia Records. However, they declined to re-record any of the album in a more polished way. Columbia released the album without alterations, as it had done with the 1989 re-release of their debut 1988 album Bread & Circus. Pale was released in January 1990. "Come Back Down" was the first radio single for the album.

In May 2009, the band announced plans to re-release Pale, out of print since 2001, in a remastered edition with expanded artwork and bonus tracks culled from the album sessions that didn't make it onto the album. Their debut, Bread & Circus would also get the same kind of re-issue. In 2010 the band signed a deal with Primary Wave to handle their back catalog and licensing. These reissues had been confirmed by lead singer Glen Phillips via Toad's "Fan Questions" portion of their official website for release in 2011, but never occurred. Instead, a remastered vinyl LP reissue of fear and Dulcinea were released in 2018 through the band's online store.

== Track listing ==
All tracks are written by Toad the Wet Sprocket.

No.	Title	Length
1.	"Torn"	2:58
2.	"Come Back Down"	3:19
3.	"Don't Go Away"	4:33
4.	"High on a Riverbed"	4:01
5.	"I Think About"	3:23
6.	"Corporal Brown"	3:10
7.	"Jam"	3:31
8.	"Chile"	4:38
9.	"Liars Everywhere"	2:17
10.	"Nothing Is Alone"	2:38
11.	"She Cried"	4:28

== Charts ==
Singles – Billboard (United States)

Year	Single	Chart	Position
1990	"Come Back Down"	Modern Rock Tracks	27
