= Five Live (Toad the Wet Sprocket EP) =

EP by Toad the Wet Sprocket
- Released: 1992
- Recorded: Whisky a Go Go
- Genre: Alternative rock
- Length: 16:41
- Label: Columbia

Toad the Wet Sprocket chronology
Fear (1991)	Five Live (1992)	Dulcinea (1994)

Professional ratings
Review scores
Source	Rating
Allmusic	3.5/5 stars

Five Live is a live EP by alternative rock band Toad the Wet Sprocket. The EP was a limited pressing of 5,000 copies bundled with the first pressing of the album Fear. The EP was recorded live on December 19, 1991, at the Whisky a Go Go, Hollywood, CA, and on December 21, 1991, at the Anaconda Theater, Santa Barbara, CA. It was mixed at Master Control in Burbank, CA. It contains four live songs from their prior albums as well as a live version of "Hold Her Down", which is from the Fear album.

== Track listing ==
1. "Jam" – 3:08
2. "One Little Girl" – 3:19
3. "Scenes from a Vinyl Recliner" – 4:31
4. "Come Back Down" – 2:50
5. "Hold Her Down" – 2:53
