= Toad the Wet Sprocket =

American alternative rock band

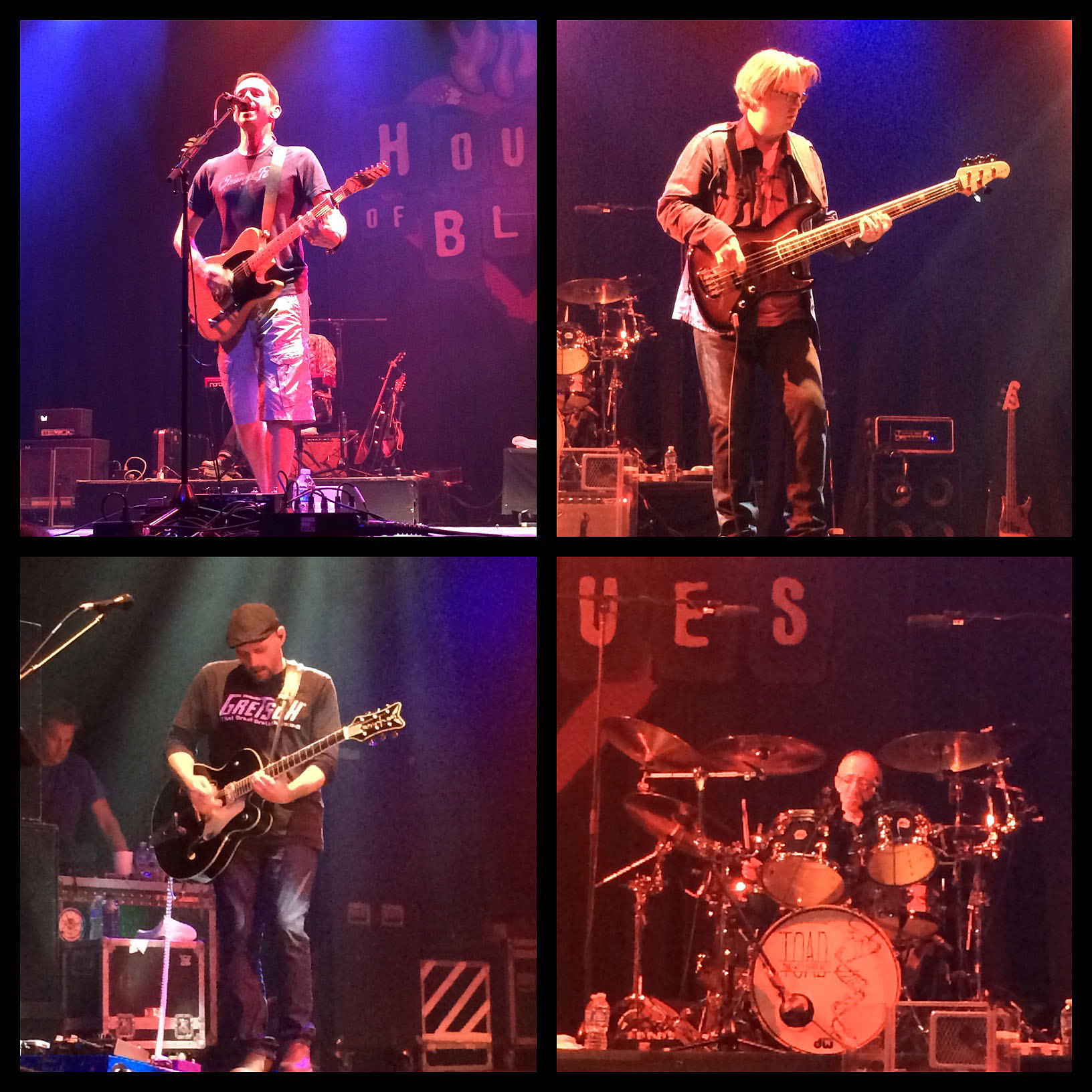
- Toad the Wet Sprocket in 2014

Background information
- Origin: Santa Barbara, California, US
- Genres: Alternative rock; folk rock; pop rock; jangle pop (early)
- Years active: 1986–1998; 2002; 2006–2007; 2010–present
- Labels: Columbia; Abe's Records
- Members: Glen Phillips; Todd Nichols; Dean Dinning; Carl Thomson
- Past members: Randy Guss; Josh Daubin
- Website: toadthewetsprocket.com

Toad the Wet Sprocket is an American alternative rock band formed in Santa Barbara, California, in 1986. The band at the time consisted of vocalist/guitarist Glen Phillips, guitarist Todd Nichols, bassist Dean Dinning, and drummer Randy Guss, who stopped touring in 2017 and left the band in 2020. They had chart success in the 1990s with singles that included "Walk on the Ocean", "All I Want", "Something's Always Wrong", "Fall Down", and "Good Intentions".

The band broke up in 1998 to pursue other projects; however, they began touring the United States again in 2006 for short-run tours each summer in small venues. In December 2010, the band announced their official reunion as a full-time working band; they also started writing songs for their first studio album of new material since their 1997 Columbia Records release, Coil. Their most recent full-length album, Starting Now, was released on August 27, 2021, and the compilation All You Want was re-released in 2023. An acoustic album of previous hits, Rings: The Acoustic Sessions, was released in 2026.

== History ==
=== Name origin ===
Toad the Wet Sprocket takes its name from a Monty Python comedy sketch called "Rock Notes", in which a journalist delivers a nonsensical music news report:

Rex Stardust, lead electric triangle with Toad the Wet Sprocket, has had to have an elbow removed following their recent successful worldwide tour of Finland. Flamboyant ambidextrous Rex apparently fell off the back of a motorcycle. "Fell off the back of a motorcyclist, most likely," quipped ace drummer Jumbo McClooney on hearing of the accident. Plans are already afoot for a major tour of Iceland.

There was also an extended skit about the fictional Toad the Wet Sprocket on one of Idle's later shows, Rutland Weekend Television (Season 1, Episode 4, "Rutland Weekend Whistle Test"). RWT musician and regular cast member Neil Innes, ex-Bonzo Dog Doo-Dah Band and "The Seventh Python", played keyboards with the fictional band.

As their first gig approached, the band still had not chosen a name. The members facetiously adopted "Toad the Wet Sprocket" because they thought it would be "hilarious". Vocalist Glen Phillips later called it "a joke that went on too long" and, according to their website, "it was probably meant to be temporary at the time." The name had been used once before, by a short-lived British blues band of the late 1970s that had appeared on the 1980 Metal for Muthas compilation, although the earlier band had long since split up when Phillips and company formed their band.

Eric Idle, the sketch's original performer, reflected on the band's name in a 1999 performance:

I once wrote a sketch about rock musicians, and I was trying to think of a name that would be so silly nobody would ever use it, or dream it could ever be used. So I wrote the words "Toad the Wet Sprocket." And a few years later, I was driving along the freeway in LA, and a song came on the radio, and the DJ said, "that was by Toad the Wet Sprocket," and I nearly drove off the freeway.

=== Early career (1986–1990) ===
Toad the Wet Sprocket was formed in 1986, with the members having known one another from San Marcos High School just outside Santa Barbara, California. Singer/songwriter and guitarist Glen Phillips was only 15, while guitarist Todd Nichols, bassist Dean Dinning, and drummer Randy Guss were 19. Phillips was a 9th grader at San Marcos High and the others were all 12th graders. The band's first public appearance was at an open-mic talent contest in September 1986. The band did not win.

Toad the Wet Sprocket's first album was released in 1989. Bread & Circus was self-financed through their label, Abe's Records. The album spawned the singles "Way Away" and "One Little Girl", which made the Billboard Modern Rock Tracks chart but received little attention.

The follow-up to Bread & Circus, Pale, was released in 1990, and saw Toad the Wet Sprocket's sound mature. During the recording of the album, the band signed to Columbia Records while declining the opportunity to re-record Pale but negotiating to have Columbia Records reissue Bread & Circus. Featuring the singles "Jam" and the modern-rock chart hit "Come Back Down", the album was still not a success, but the singles received heavy airplay on college radio stations. The band's first music video (for "One Little Girl") was directed by Mark Miremont and aired on MTV's 120 Minutes.

=== Commercial breakthrough (1991–1998) ===
Toad the Wet Sprocket finally achieved fame with their third album, 1991's fear. The album's singles "All I Want" and "Walk on the Ocean" reached the top 20 of the Billboard Hot 100. The album became the band's first RIAA-certified platinum album.

In 1993, the Mike Myers feature film So I Married an Axe Murderer included the song "Brother" on its soundtrack. "Brother" later appeared on the In Light Syrup compilation album, as well as the CD Extra compilation album included with IBM Aptiva PCs in 1996. The song was later included on the 2004 release of the live album Welcome Home: Live at the Arlington Theatre, Santa Barbara 1992.

In 1994, after years of heavy touring, Toad the Wet Sprocket released Dulcinea, their follow-up to fear. This album spawned the hit singles "Fall Down", which reached No. 1 on the U.S. Modern Rock charts, as well as No. 5 on the Mainstream Rock chart, and "Something's Always Wrong", which also charted. Like fear, this album was certified platinum by the RIAA. The video for Fall Down was based on the movie "They Shoot Horses, Don't They?" The video for "Something's Always Wrong" was not played extensively on MTV because Phillips claims that MTV thought it too closely resembled the Home Shopping Network.

A 1995 compilation album of b-sides and rarities, In Light Syrup, included the singles "Good Intentions", which was featured on the soundtrack for the television show Friends, as well as the aforementioned "Brother". The compilation was certified as a gold album in 2001.

The release of 1997's Coil acted as the proper follow-up to 1994's Dulcinea. Featuring a more electric, rock sound, it featured the modern-rock and mainstream rock hit "Come Down", as well as the singles "Crazy Life" (a previous recording of the song was featured on the soundtrack for the film Empire Records) and "Whatever I Fear", which did not chart. The album, despite the success of "Come Down" as a single, failed to reach any sales benchmarks. This failure is often attributed to the label doing a poor job of promoting the album.

Toad the Wet Sprocket formally broke up in July 1998, citing creative differences.

=== Post-breakup and reunions (1998–2008) ===
Toad the Wet Sprocket, though officially broken up since 1998, worked together off and on over the years. They performed on several occasions in 1999, although only short sets. Also in 1999, Phillips, Dinning, and Guss recorded two studio tracks for a compilation release, P.S. (A Toad Retrospective), including one of the first songs the band wrote together, "P.S." Nichols declined to participate in these sessions and was replaced by Lapdog guitarist Rob Taylor.

Toad the Wet Sprocket temporarily reunited in late 2002, playing a benefit for the Rape Crisis Center in Santa Barbara and opening a few shows for Counting Crows. The group then played a few months of full-length shows in early 2003. Although these gigs were seemingly successful, at the end of the tour, the band decided to continue on their separate paths and careers. In 2004, the band released an album of a live show that had been taped in 1992. This album, Welcome Home: Live at The Arlington Theatre, Santa Barbara 1992, showcased the height of their popularity during the tour for fear.

Between 2004 and 2010, Toad the Wet Sprocket performed several short sets together. In the summer of 2006, the band reunited for a 34-date nationwide tour of the United States. During the summer of 2007, they played several shows with lead singer Glen Phillips serving as their opening act. On January 16, 2008, the band reunited once again to play two shows – one in St. Petersburg, Florida, then the next night at the House of Blues Orlando, prior to joining The Rock Boat VIII. On January 25, 2008, the band played a set at the Ann Arbor Folk Festival in Ann Arbor, Michigan. On June 11–12, 2008, they played in Philadelphia and New Jersey at the Trocadero Theatre and Starland Ballroom, respectively. On June 14, 2008, they played at the 27th annual Alexandria Red Cross Waterfront Festival. On June 15, 2008, the band performed at The Norva in Norfolk, Virginia. One of the show's highlights was the band performing Glen Phillip's solo hit "Everything But You".

On December 19, 2008, Toad the Wet Sprocket performed on The Adam Carolla Show at the Canyon Club in Agoura Hills, California. In May 2009, they played a four show mini-tour, including two nights at the intimate 400 seat venue The Ark in Ann Arbor, Michigan, and also in an outdoor venue at Neptunes Park in Virginia Beach, Virginia. Continuing throughout the 2009 summer, the group played a second 12-stop mini tour, which started with a show at the House of Blues in Houston. During the show, the band noted that it had been some time since they had played a venue in Texas. However, noting the positive crowd response and energetic atmosphere, Phillips stated that the group "would try to make it an annual stop" in the future.

=== Full-time reunion, return to recording, New Constellation, and Starting Now (2009–present) ===
In 2009, bassist Dean Dinning said Toad the Wet Sprocket was now something each member considered an active project; though they had not released a new studio album since 1997, and only did small summer tours, they no longer considered themselves "broken up". In May 2010, the band gathered at a California studio to begin re-recording some of their older hits for licensing reasons. Columbia Records owns the masters to the band's albums. Therefore, the band makes little money from them, so to be able to make a living off their own talent again, they made these re-recordings with the goal of having them used in film and TV.

On December 7, 2010, Toad the Wet Sprocket released their first new studio track in 11 years. The holiday track "It Doesn't Feel Like Christmas", a cover of a Sam Phillips original, was posted on their official site, available via Bandcamp, for free download just in time for the holidays, along with a new message on their site: "We're that band that did 'Walk on the Ocean', 'All I Want', 'Something's Always Wrong', and "Fall Down'. The one with the weird name. We're back from a long slumber and look forward to saying hello some time. Keep in touch…" The band had recently signed a deal with Primary Wave to handle their back catalog and any future releases, and on December 11, 2010, the band mentioned, both on stage and in an offstage YouTube interview, that they are currently writing songs for their first new studio album since 1997's Coil. In addition, they began playing two new songs, "Friendly Fire" and "The Moment", which were being worked on for the new album.

On April 12, 2011, Toad the Wet Sprocket released a new greatest hits album titled All You Want in digital and disc form via their official website. The 11-track CD includes brand new studio versions of their hits. The band does not have access to some of the versions they did for Columbia Records in the '90s. However, they did regain full control of the songs from their first two albums, and they planned to re-release them in remastered form on their own label, Abe's Records, following the release of their upcoming studio album.

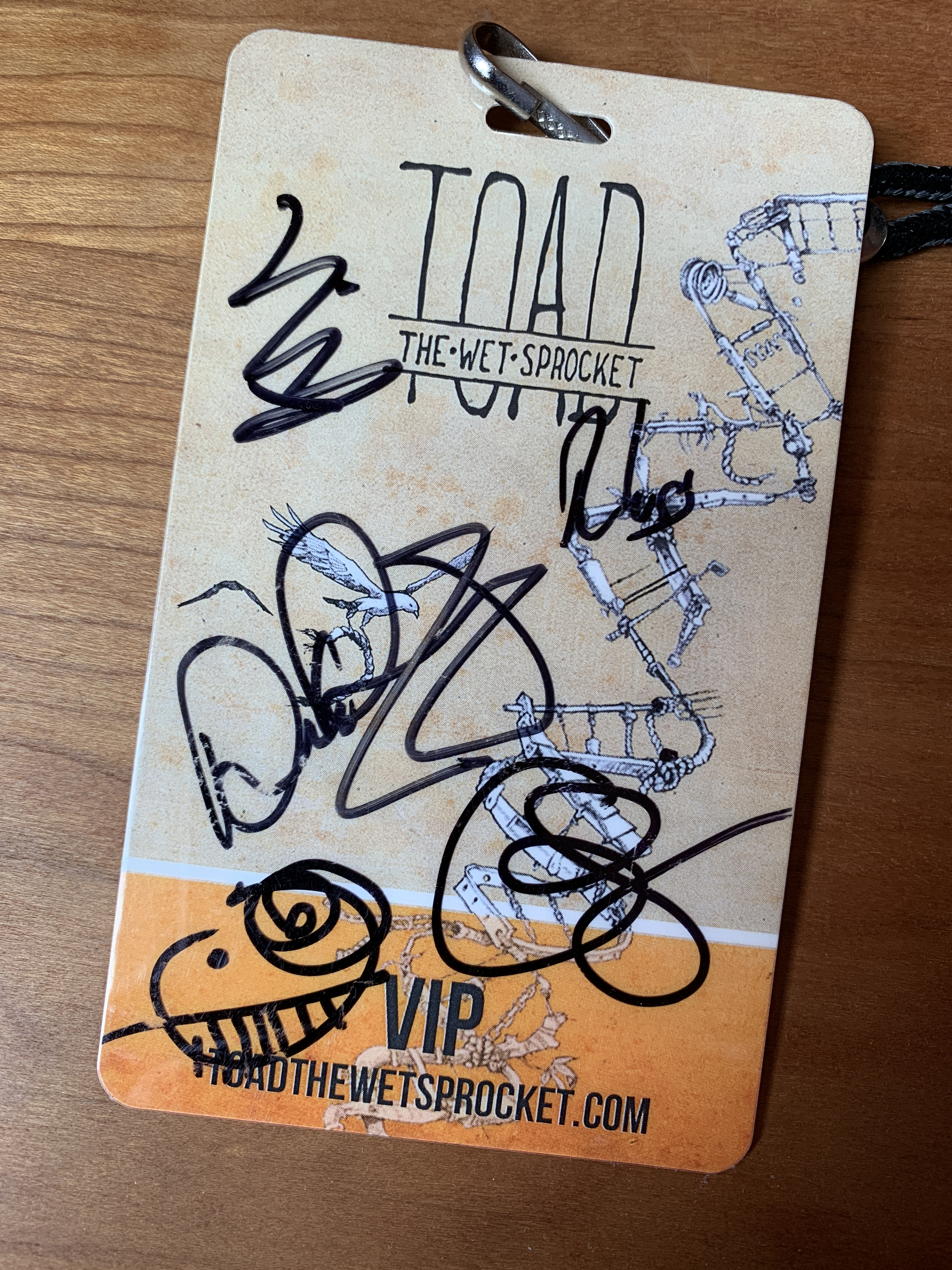
Access pass to the August 2013 Troubadour New Constellation kickoff show, signed by the band members.

On March 22, 2013, it was announced via Toad the Wet Sprocket's Facebook page that recording of the new album had been completed. The album was produced and mixed by Mikal Blue at Revolver Studios in Thousand Oaks, California. On June 5, 2013, the band announced the first new single in 16 years on Rolling Stone's website titled "New Constellation". An album of the same name was released on the band's own Abe's Records on October 15, 2013. The title song of the album refers to astronomy and includes a litany of saints. Phillips has said that the named saints refer to artists who suffer from mental illnesses..The band marketed the new album via the crowdsourcing website Kickstarter. The band initially set a fundraising goal of $50,000, expecting it to take about two months to raise that amount. Instead, fans contributed more than $50,000 in less than 20 hours. When the Kickstarter campaign finally came to a close, they had raised a total of $264,762. The band kicked off their new album with a release party for Kickstarter supporters at The Palm restaurant in Los Angeles, California, on August 23, 2013, followed immediately by a live performance at the nearby Troubadour music venue.

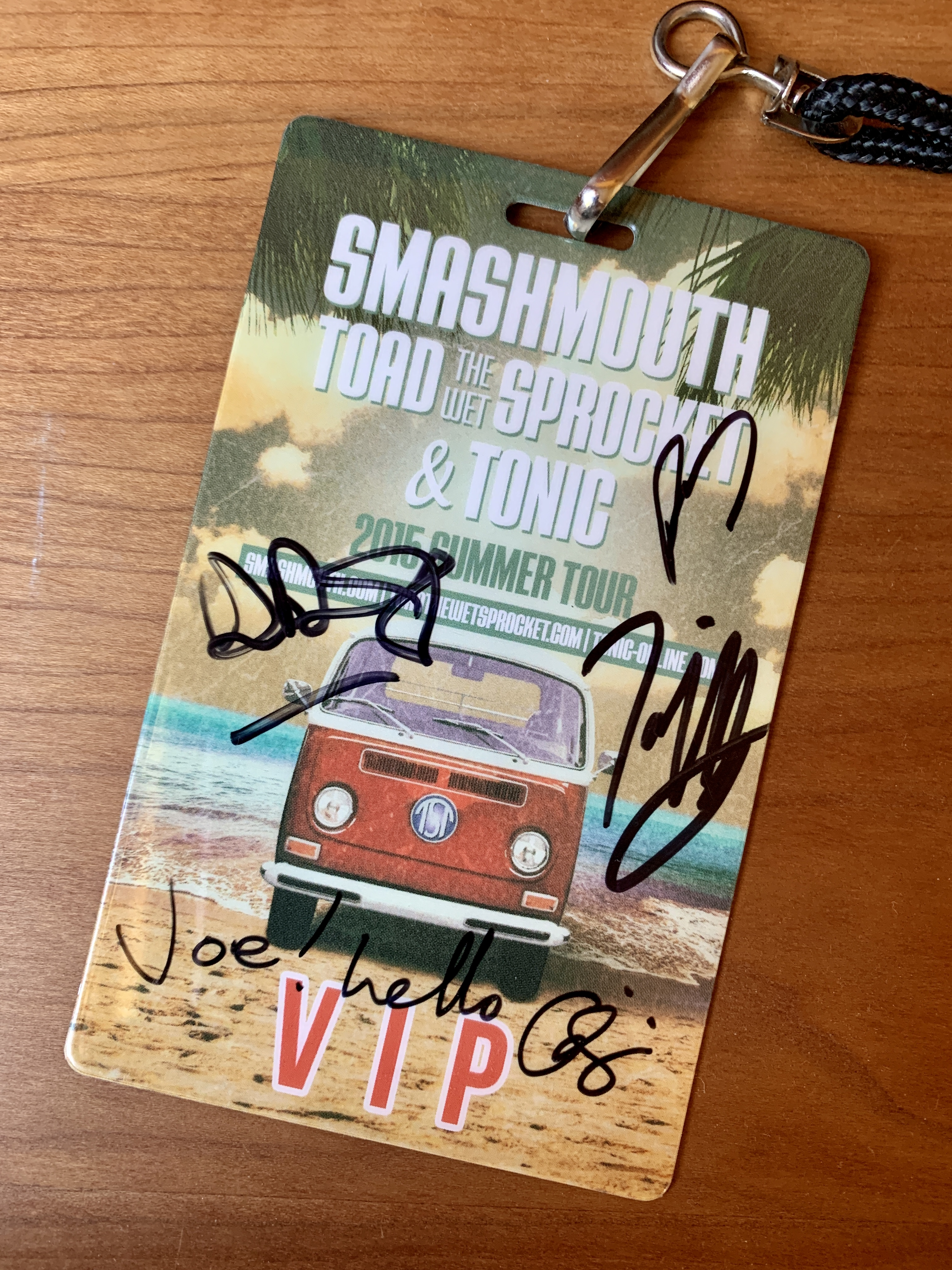
VIP access pass to the 2015 Toad, Tonic, & Smash Mouth concert series, signed by Toad's band members.

In 2014, Toad the Wet Sprocket resumed touring and opened a number of shows for Counting Crows. They showcased some of the new material from New Constellation, the Kickstarter-funded album, including "California Wasted" and the album's title track while playing a number of their earlier hits. During summer 2015, the band went on tour with fellow '90s acts Smash Mouth and Tonic. The band released an EP called Architect of the Ruin on June 16, 2015.

In 2018, Toad the Wet Sprocket announced that they had reissued their albums fear and Dulcinea on a deluxe remastered vinyl LP available through their online store. The same year, they also released a limited deluxe 5-LP box set of colored vinyl for their albums fear, Dulcinea and Acoustic Dance Party.

In a January 2020 interview with ChicagoNow, Glen Phillips stated that "Toad has started recording again." In addition, he confirmed the band's first official lineup change, and that drummer Guss had left the band on good terms. Previous occasional touring member Josh Daubin replaced Guss, supporting the band on tours from 2017 through 2022 and also appearing on the 2021 album Starting Now. Carl Thomson took Daubin's place and has been drumming on tour since 2023.

On September 25, 2020, they released a new song titled "Starting Now", followed by another new song "Old Habits Die Hard" on October 23, from their album, Starting Now, released on August 27, 2021. The album featured the song "Transient Whales". Glen Phillips has stated that the song is about starting the post-divorce chapter of his life.

In 2025, Toad the Wet Sprocket headlined the Good Intentions Tour with The Jayhawks, KT Tunstall, Sixpence None the Richer, and Vertical Horizon. They released acoustic versions of their hits in the lead-up to a new album release later in the year.

The band's most recent album, Rings: The Acoustic Sessions, was released in 2026, reimagining songs spanning their career in an unplugged format. The album was released to celebrate their 40th Anniversary as a band. The limited edition pre-order of the album includes a bonus EP on vinyl with tracks not featured on the album, it sold out in its first day on sale. The album received acclaim from publications including Americana UK, Glide, and At the Barrier.

== Musical style ==
Toad the Wet Sprocket have been most consistently labelled as alternative rock, but their music has also been described as folk rock, pop rock, jangle pop, and folk-pop.

AllMusic writer Kelly McCarteny described Toad's early music as having a "jangle pop, garage band sound", and noted that their album Fear was a shift to "smart and catchy pop/rock songs".

== Associated acts ==
=== Glen Phillips' solo career ===
Immediately after the band's breakup in 1998, Phillips began his solo career, releasing five solo studio albums: Abulum (2000), Winter Pays For Summer (2005), and Mr. Lemons (2006), Coyote Sessions (2012), and Swallowed by the New (2016), along with two live albums, Live At Largo (2003), and Live at the Belly Up (2016).

=== Lapdog ===
In the late 1990s, Nichols and Dinning formed a new band called Lapdog. They recorded and released the studio album Near Tonight (2001), and toured minimally. After this, Dinning quit the band to split his time between recording and producing local music and pursuing his acting career. Guss joined Lapdog as their drummer. Again, Lapdog recorded and released an album, called Mayfly (2002). Nichols has since ended Lapdog and is focusing on writing songs along with Dinning in Nashville for country acts, and producing bands at his studio, Abe's, in Los Angeles. A Lapdog song, "See You Again", appears in revamped/revised form on Toad the Wet Sprocket's New Constellation album under the title "I'll Bet On You".

== Band members ==
=== Current members ===
- Dean Dinning – bass guitar, backing vocals, keyboards, rhythm guitar (1986–present)
- Todd Nichols – lead guitar, backing vocals, mandolin (1986–present)
- Glen Phillips – lead vocals, rhythm guitar, mandolin, keyboards (1986–present)

=== Former members ===
- Randy Guss – drums, backing vocals (1986–2020). A drummer who stopped touring in 2017 and left the band in 2020. The primary reason for his departure is that he was unable to tour due to the progression of his osteogenesis imperfecta. With Lapdog he contributed to Mayfly (2003); with Duplex he contributed to Two Guitars, Bass and Drums (2011).

=== Touring members ===
- Bruce Winter – keyboards, backing vocals (1992)
- Jonathan Kingham – keyboards, backing vocals, rhythm guitar, mandolin, lap steel guitar (2011–22)
- Josh Daubin – drums, percussion, backing vocals (2017–22)
- Jon Sosin – keyboards, lap steel, mandolin (2023–present)
- Carl Thompson – drums, percussion (2023–present)

=== Session substitutes ===
- Rob Taylor – lead guitar on "Eyes Open Wide" from P.S. (A Toad Retrospective) (1999)

== Discography ==
- Bread & Circus (1988)
- Pale (1990)
- Fear (1991)
- Dulcinea (1994)
- In Light Syrup (1995)
- Coil (1997)
- New Constellation (2013)
- Starting Now (2021)
- Rings: The Acoustic Sessions (2026)
