= Walk on the Ocean =

1992 single by Toad the Wet Sprocket

Single by Toad the Wet Sprocket

from the album Fear
- B-side: "All in All"
- Released: 1992
- Genre: Alternative rock
- Length: 2:59 (album version); 3:32 (single version)
- Label: Columbia
- Songwriters: Glen Phillips, Todd Nichols
- Producer: Gavin MacKillop

Toad the Wet Sprocket singles chronology
"Hold Her Down" (1992)	"Walk on the Ocean" (1992)	"I Will Not Take These Things for Granted" (1993)

"Walk on the Ocean" is a song by American alternative rock group Toad the Wet Sprocket from their third studio album, Fear (1991). Two different versions of the song were released: the album version with a cold ending (timed at 2:59) and the single version with the chorus repeated until fade (timed at 3:32). Commercially, "Walk on the Ocean" peaked at number 18 on the US Billboard Hot 100 and reached the top 40 in Canada, New Zealand, and Norway.

== Composition ==
The song was written after singer Glen Phillips and his wife were vacationing on Orcas Island in Washington's San Juan Islands after they "hung out at Doe Bay hot springs with a bunch of hippies."

Phillips quickly wrote lyrics as placeholders, intending to change the words later, but he ultimately felt he could not write anything better. "I wrote down literally the first thing that came across my mind. The lyric and the chorus, I have no idea what it means, unfortunately. Then I tried rewriting it and nothing ever really worked. I tried to make the chorus mean something, and eventually said, 'Well, it sounds like I know what I'm talking about.' So we just left it as is. It was the least-conscious, least-crafted lyric," he said.

== Track listings ==
US CD and cassette single

1. "Walk on the Ocean" (single version) – 3:32
2. "All in All" – 4:02
3. "Walk on the Ocean" (album version) – 2:59

European CD and cassette single

1. "Walk on the Ocean" (single version) – 3:32
2. "All in All" – 4:02

== Charts ==
Chart (1992–1993)	Peak position
Australia (ARIA)	152
Canada Top Singles (RPM)	22
Germany (GfK)	67
New Zealand (Recorded Music NZ)	22
Norway (VG-lista)	10
US Billboard Hot 100	18
US Adult Contemporary (Billboard)	31
US Album Rock Tracks (Billboard)	27
US Top 40/Mainstream (Billboard)	10

== Use in media ==
The song appears on the soundtrack of the 2013 American film Jobs. The song appears on the soundtrack of the 2014 American film Adult Beginners. The song appears on the soundtrack of the 2015 American television series Hindsight.
