= Dulcinea (album) =

Studio album by Toad the Wet Sprocket
- Released: May 24, 1994
- Recorded: 1993
- Studio: The Site (Marin County, California)
- Genre: Alternative rock, jangle pop
- Length: 49:39
- Label: Columbia
- Producer: Gavin MacKillop

Toad the Wet Sprocket chronology
Five Live (1993)	Dulcinea (1994)	Acoustic Dance Party (1994)

Singles from Dulcinea
- 1. "Fall Down" Released: April 1994; 2. "Something's Always Wrong" Released: 1994; 3. "Fly from Heaven" Released: 1995; 4. "Stupid" Released: 1995

Professional ratings
Review scores
Source	Rating
Allmusic	4/5 stars
Classic Rock	7/10 stars

Dulcinea is an album by Toad the Wet Sprocket released in 1994. It is their fourth studio album with Columbia Records and the follow-up to their popular album Fear, which was released in 1991. Two songs from Dulcinea charted on the Modern Rock and Mainstream Rock charts: "Fall Down" and "Something's Always Wrong". Dulcinea was RIAA Certified Gold on September 1, 1994, and Platinum on July 31, 1995.

The album's name is a reference to the love interest in Miguel de Cervantes' classic Spanish novel, Don Quixote. At least two songs on the album allude to themes found in the novel. "Crowing" is a song about a person who does not know how to hold on to a lover. "Windmills" is a metaphorical song about how people spend much of their lives chasing absurd or impossible pursuits (the allusion being to a specific scene in Don Quixote where the title character uselessly attacks a windmill). The album's artwork (illustrated by artist Jason Holley) also explores Cervantes' windmill metaphor, depicting the incongruence between the way things are and how people tend to perceive them.

Dulcinea also delves into some spiritual themes. "Fly from Heaven" is sung from the perspective of James, who is portrayed as Jesus's literal brother and is upset by Paul's manipulation of Jesus's word. "Begin" and "Reincarnation Song" each explore questions about death and the afterlife.

Glen Phillips has said that Dulcinea is probably his favorite Toad album because they started to know what they were doing but were not overthinking things yet.

== Track listing ==
No.	Title	Writer(s)	Length
1.	"Fly from Heaven"	Glen Phillips	4:33
2.	"Woodburning"	Todd Nichols, Phillips	3:59
3.	"Something's Always Wrong"	Nichols, Phillips	4:59
4.	"Stupid"	Phillips	2:42
5.	"Crowing"	Phillips	3:20
6.	"Listen"	Nichols, Phillips	4:09
7.	"Windmills"	Phillips	3:50
8.	"Nanci"	Phillips	3:00
9.	"Fall Down"	Nichols, Phillips	3:24
10.	"Inside"	Nichols, Phillips	4:19
11.	"Begin"	Nichols, Phillips	4:05
12.	"Reincarnation Song"	Phillips	4:44
13.	"Hope" (bonus track on international release)		3:37

Other tracks recorded during the album's 1993 sessions included "Crazy Life" (later released on the Empire Records soundtrack and remixed by Tom Lord-Alge for Coil) as well as an alternate take of "Reincarnation Song" and two tracks, "Hope" and "All Right" which would be released on In Light Syrup the following year.

== Personnel ==
- Dean Dinning – bass, keyboards, backing vocals
- Randy Guss – drums, percussion
- Todd Nichols – guitars, backing vocals
- Glen Phillips – lead vocals, guitars, keyboards

== Charts ==
Chart (1994)	Peak position
Australian Albums (ARIA)	145
US Billboard 200	34

== Certifications ==
Region	Certification	Certified units/sales
United States (RIAA)	Platinum	1,000,000^{^}
^{^} Shipments figures based on certification alone.
