= Something's Always Wrong =

1994 single by Toad the Wet Sprocket

Single by Toad the Wet Sprocket

from the album Dulcinea
- Released: 1994
- Genre: Alternative rock
- Length: 4:59
- Label: Columbia
- Songwriters: Todd Nichols, Glen Phillips
- Producer: Gavin MacKillop

Toad the Wet Sprocket singles chronology
"Fall Down" (1994)	"Something's Always Wrong" (1994)	"Fly from Heaven" (1995)

"Something's Always Wrong" is a single by American alternative rock band Toad the Wet Sprocket. The song is included on their fourth studio album, Dulcinea (1994). "Something's Always Wrong" was co-written by Glen Phillips and Todd Nichols. Although not as popular as "Fall Down", "Something's Always Wrong" became a chart hit in the United States and Canada.

== Background ==
Singer Glen Phillips said,

'Something's Always Wrong' is an amalgam of a whole bunch of relational observations. Todd had that music and the only line he had was, 'Something has gone wrong.' And I kind of lifted that and switched it. As a person who struggles a lot with depression and negative ideation, for me that's the state I'm always swimming upstream against: that feeling that something's wrong. It's usually based on a true story, but it's almost never the whole story.

== Chart performance ==
"Something's Always Wrong" peaked at number nine on the US Billboard Modern Rock Tracks chart. The single also peaked at number 41 on the Billboard Hot 100 and number 15 on the Canadian RPM 100 Hit Tracks chart.

== Track listing ==
1. "Something's Always Wrong"
2. "Don't Go Away" (live)
3. "Corporal Brown" (live)

== Charts ==
Chart (1994)	Peak position
Canada Top Singles (RPM)	15
Iceland (Íslenski Listinn Topp 40)	39
US Billboard Hot 100	41
US Album Rock Tracks (Billboard)	22
US Modern Rock Tracks (Billboard)	9
US Top 40/Mainstream (Billboard)	14
