= All I Want (Toad the Wet Sprocket song) =

1992 single by Toad the Wet Sprocket

- Artwork for US releases (CD single pictured)

Single by Toad the Wet Sprocket

from the album Fear
- Released: 1992
- Genre: Alternative rock; pop rock
- Length: 3:16
- Label: Columbia
- Songwriters: Todd Nichols; Glen Phillips; Dean Dinning; Randy Guss
- Producer: Gavin MacKillop

Toad the Wet Sprocket singles chronology
"Is It for Me" (1991)	"All I Want" (1992)	"Hold Her Down" (1992)

"All I Want" is a song by American alternative rock band Toad the Wet Sprocket, released by Columbia Records in 1992 as the second single from their third album, Fear (1991). "All I Want" reached number 15 on the US Billboard Hot 100 and number 10 on the US Cash Box Top 100. For its radio release, a version was parenthetically labeled a remix and featured pronounced vocal mastering, heard mainly during the song's hook. The album version is the unmastered mix.

== Composition ==
On the song's content, singer Glen Phillips said, "It's very much about how fleeting any kind of epiphany is. It's all about the moment passing very, very quickly and how there's a desire to hold onto it. That would be a constant, but it comes and it goes, and it goes very quickly."

== Track listings ==
US CD and cassette single; UK 7-inch single

1. "All I Want" – 3:15
2. "All She Said" – 3:47

Australian CD single

1. "All I Want" – 3:15
2. "Hold Her Down" – 3:07

European CD single

1. "All I Want" – 3:15
2. "Hold Her Down" – 3:07
3. "Come Back Down" – 3:19
4. "One Little Girl" – 3:26

== Charts ==
=== Weekly charts ===
Chart (1992–1993)	Peak position
Australia (ARIA)	99
Canada Top Singles (RPM)	11
Canada Adult Contemporary (RPM)	16
Germany (GfK)	53
Iceland (Íslenski Listinn Topp 40)	36
New Zealand (Recorded Music NZ)	44
US Billboard Hot 100	15
US Adult Contemporary (Billboard)	14
US Album Rock Tracks (Billboard)	22
US Modern Rock Tracks (Billboard)	22
US Top 40/Mainstream (Billboard)	4
US Cash Box Top 100	10

=== Year-end charts ===
Chart (1992)	Position
Canada Top Singles (RPM)	87
US Billboard Hot 100	53

== Cover versions ==
Post-hardcore band Emery recorded a cover of the song, which was included on the 2006 compilation Punk Goes 90's.

== In popular culture ==
The song was featured in the TV series Doogie Howser, M.D., Dawson's Creek, Reunion and Homeland.

In 2005, the song was added onto the Nickelodeon soundtrack, Zoey 101: Music Mix as the 10th track, along with other songs that were featured in Nickelodeon's Zoey 101.
