= Bread & Circus =

Studio album by Toad the Wet Sprocket
- Released: July 26, 1989 (Columbia Re-Issue)
- Recorded: May 12 to September 8, 1988 at Camp David in Thousand Oaks, California
- Genre: Alternative rock
- Length: 37:49
- Label: Columbia, Abe's Records
- Producer: Toad the Wet Sprocket ("Coached by" Brad Nack)

Toad the Wet Sprocket chronology
Bread & Circus (1989)	Pale (1990)

Singles from Bread & Circus
- 1. "One Little Girl" Released: 1989

Professional ratings
Review scores
Source	Rating
AllMusic	3/5 stars
Chicago Tribune	2/4 stars
The Encyclopedia of Popular Music	3/5 stars
MusicHound Rock: The Essential Album Guide	2.5/5 stars

Bread & Circus is the debut album by American alternative rock band Toad the Wet Sprocket, originally self-released on cassette in 1988, and re-released in 1989 by Columbia Records.

In May 2009, the band announced plans to re-release Bread & Circus, out of print since 2001, in a remastered edition with expanded artwork and unreleased tracks culled from the album sessions. In 2010, the band signed a deal with Primary Wave to handle their back catalog and licensing. The reissues had been confirmed by lead singer Glen Phillips via Toad's "Fan Questions" portion of their official website for release in 2011, but never occurred.

== Production ==
The album was recorded over eight days for a total cost of $650. Singer Glen Phillips wrote most of the lyrics when he was only 15 years old. Before agreeing to sign with Columbia, the band insisted that the label re-release the album in unchanged form.

== Critical reception ==
Trouser Press called the band "initially an R.E.M. clone: a little jangle in the guitars, some nice harmonies and not much else." The Chicago Tribune wrote that the band "lacks R.E.M.'s melodic sense, evocative imagery and adrenaline."

== Track listing ==
All tracks are written by Toad the Wet Sprocket.

No.	Title	Length
1.	"Way Away"	3:07
2.	"Scenes from a Vinyl Recliner"	4:11
3.	"Unquiet"	2:54
4.	"Humble/Know Me"	5:13
5.	"When We Recovered"	2:52
6.	"One Wind Blows"	3:26
7.	"Pale Blue"	3:21
8.	"Always Changing Probably"	4:48
9.	"One Little Girl"	3:25
10.	"Covered in Roses"	4:25

== Personnel ==
- Glen Phillips – vocals, guitar
- Todd Nichols – guitar, producer
- Randy Guss – drums, producer
- Dean Dinning – bass, vocals (background), Producer
- Brian Gardner – Mastering
- Brad Nack – Artwork, Coach, Cover Art
- Pete Tangen – Photography
- Toad the Wet Sprocket – producer
- David Vaught – engineer, mixing

== Charts ==
Singles - Billboard (North America)

Year	Single	Chart	Position
1989	"One Little Girl"	Modern Rock Tracks	24
