= Fear (Toad the Wet Sprocket album) =

1991 studio album by Toad the Wet Sprocket

fear

Studio album by Toad the Wet Sprocket
- Released: August 27, 1991
- Recorded: January 2–27, 1991
- Studio: Granny's House in Reno, Nevada
- Genre: Alternative rock; pop rock
- Length: 46:37
- Label: Columbia
- Producer: Gavin MacKillop

Toad the Wet Sprocket chronology
Pale (1990)	fear (1991)	Five Live (1993)

Singles from fear
- 1. "Is It for Me" Released: 1991; 2. "All I Want" Released: 1992; 3. "Hold Her Down" Released: 1992; 4. "Walk on the Ocean" Released: 1992; 5. "I Will Not Take These Things for Granted" Released: 1993

Professional ratings
Review scores
Source	Rating
Allmusic	4/5 stars

fear is the third studio album by American alternative rock band Toad the Wet Sprocket. The album is their second album for Columbia Records, and was released on August 27, 1991. It became the first commercially successful album for the band, selling over a million copies and was certified platinum three years after release, on September 1, 1994.

The album debuted at number 49 on Billboard 200 a year after its release. Two of the album's singles peaked within the Billboard Hot 100's top 40: "All I Want" and "Walk on the Ocean", which peaked at numbers 15 and 18 on the Billboard Hot 100, respectively.

== Background ==
Toad the Wet Sprocket's first album, Bread & Circus, was financed and recorded by the band in eight days for $650 in 1989. The band sold copies of the album on cassette, eventually signing with Columbia Records after recording their second album, Pale. Despite an offer from Columbia to restart the sessions for Pale, the band decided to continue to record the album by themselves at a cost of $6,000, and re-release it with Columbia.

== Recording ==
The songs for the album were recorded at Granny's House, Reno, Nevada. fear was produced, recorded and mixed by Gavin MacKillop, a role he would reprise for the band's next two releases, 1994's Dulcinea and 1997's Coil.

Columbia financed the mixing of fourteen songs for the album, with twelve to be released. The two songs left off the album, "Good Intentions" and "All in All", were both released on the 1995 rarities collection In Light Syrup, along with several other tracks recorded during the fear sessions. The band members were in disagreement over "All in All" and "All I Want", and eventually "All I Want" was chosen to complete the record.

== Track listing ==
All tracks are written by Toad. However, the liner notes give first and second credits to various members track by track. These differences are noted..

No.	Title	Writer(s)	Length
1.	"Walk on the Ocean"	Glen Phillips, Todd Nichols	3:00
2.	"Is It for Me?"	Phillips, Nichols	3:24
3.	"Butterflies"	Phillips, Nichols	4:26
4.	"Nightingale Song"	Phillips	2:03
5.	"Hold Her Down"	Phillips, Nichols	3:07
6.	"Pray Your Gods"	Phillips	5:03
7.	"Before You Were Born"	Phillips	3:44
8.	"Something to Say"	Phillips	4:02
9.	"In My Ear"	Phillips, Nichols	3:10
10.	"All I Want"	Phillips	3:17
11.	"Stories I Tell"	Phillips, Nichols	5:35
12.	"I Will Not Take These Things for Granted"	Phillips	5:46

== Personnel ==
=== Musicians ===
- Glen Phillips – lead vocals, guitars, mandolin
- Todd Nichols – guitars, backing vocals, mandolin
- Dean Dinning – bass, backing vocals, keyboards
- Randy Guss – drums, percussion
- Laurel Franklin – spoken word, additional vocals

=== Production ===
- Produced by Gavin MacKillop
- Engineered by Don Evans, Gavin MacKillop & Bjorn Thorsrud
- Mixed by Gavin MacKillop

== Charts ==
Chart (1992/93)	Peak position
Australian Albums (ARIA)	179
US Billboard 200	49

== Certifications ==
Region	Certification	Certified units/sales
United States (RIAA)	Platinum	1,000,000^{^}
^{^} Shipments figures based on certification alone.
