= Coil (album) =

Studio album by Toad the Wet Sprocket
- Released: May 20, 1997
- Recorded: Master Control in Los Angeles, California & Gopher Sound in Santa Barbara, California, 1996
- Genre: Alternative rock; alternative folk
- Length: 44:13
- Label: Columbia
- Producer: Gavin MacKillop

Toad the Wet Sprocket chronology
In Light Syrup (1995)	Coil (1997)	P.S. (A Toad Retrospective) (1999)

Singles from Coil
- 1. "Come Down" Released: April 1997; 2. "Whatever I Fear" Released: 1997; 3. "Crazy Life" Released: 1997

Professional ratings
Review scores
Source	Rating
Allmusic	3/5 stars

Coil is the fifth studio album by American alternative rock band Toad the Wet Sprocket released in 1997. This was the band's last album for 16 years, until 2013's New Constellation.

As with previous albums, Coil was released under the Columbia Records label and produced by Gavin MacKillop.

== Track listing ==
No.	Title	Writer(s)	Length
1.	"Whatever I Fear"	Glen Phillips	2:58
2.	"Come Down"	Phillips, Todd Nichols	3:13
3.	"Rings"	Phillips	2:53
4.	"Dam Would Break"	Phillips	4:06
5.	"Desire"	Phillips	3:38
6.	"Don't Fade"	Phillips	4:12
7.	"Little Man Big Man"	Phillips	4:01
8.	"Throw It All Away"	Phillips	3:03
9.	"Amnesia"	Phillips, Nichols	4:22
10.	"Little Buddha"	Phillips	3:43
11.	"Crazy Life"	Phillips, Nichols	4:07
12.	"All Things in Time"	Phillips	3:44
13.	"Silo Lullaby" (Japan Bonus Track)		4:30

== Studio outtakes ==
1. "This Is My Life"
2. "Hey Bulldog"
3. "Comes A Time (Band Version)"
4. "Comes A Time (Acoustic)"
5. "Don't Know Me"
6. "Acid"
7. "Won't Let It"

According to Glen Phillips, the version of "Crazy Life" on Coil was recorded in 1994 during the sessions for the band's Dulcinea album. It was featured on the soundtrack to the 1995 film Empire Records but the band felt it deserved a place on a Toad album and fit this album's themes, so they added a new organ track and cut new background vocals and had Tom Lord-Alge do a new mix. The intro fade-in was cut short and the BPMs were pushed up to make the song slightly faster. This has led many fans to believe it is a completely different recording, despite the credits in the liner notes pointing to different studios and engineers for the track which match the Dulcinea sessions.

== Charts ==
Chart (1997)	Peak position
Australian Albums (ARIA)	199
Billboard 200	19
