= Fall Down (Toad the Wet Sprocket song) =

1994 single by Toad the Wet Sprocket

Single by Toad the Wet Sprocket

from the album Dulcinea
- B-side: "All Right"
- Released: April 1994
- Genre: Alternative rock
- Length: 3:24
- Label: Columbia
- Songwriters: Todd Nichols, Glen Phillips
- Producer: Gavin MacKillop

Toad the Wet Sprocket singles chronology
"I Will Not Take These Things for Granted" (1993)	"Fall Down" (1994)	"Something's Always Wrong" (1994)

"Fall Down" is a song by alternative rock band Toad the Wet Sprocket from their fourth studio album, Dulcinea (1994). "Fall Down" was co-written by Glen Phillips and Todd Nichols. Released to US radio in April 1994, the song topped the Billboard Modern Rock Tracks chart and peaked at number 33 on the Billboard Hot 100. In Canada, the song peaked at number 10 and ended 1994 as the country's 76th-most-successful single. The music video for the song was directed by Samuel Bayer. In 2017, Consequence magazine ranked the song number 245 (out of 354) on their list of "Every Alternative Rock No. 1 Hit from Worst to Best".

== Background ==
Singer Glen Phillips said,

I think it was written before the Fear album came out. That was an early one, and loosely based on a woman - a girl at the time - in high school, who was rebelling against and living out people's worst expectations of her. I think when you're misunderstood there's an urge sometimes to self-destruct as a form of rebellion. So, watching that happen and thinking about it.

== Chart performance ==
"Fall Down" reached number one on the Billboard Modern Rock Tracks chart in June 1994 and remained there for six weeks before being supplanted by the Offspring's "Come Out and Play" in July. It also reached the top five of the Mainstream Rock Tracks chart, peaking at number five, and was a top-40 Billboard Hot 100 hit, reaching number 33 to become the band's third and most recent top-40 hit on that chart.

== Track listings ==
US CD, 7-inch, and cassette single

1. "Fall Down" – 3:23
2. "All Right" – 5:46

UK CD single

1. "Fall Down" – 3:23
2. "One Little Girl" – 3:23
3. "Come Back Down" – 3:16
4. "Nightingale Song" (live) – 2:18

European CD single

1. "Fall Down" – 3:23
2. "One Little Girl" – 3:23

== Charts ==
=== Weekly charts ===
Chart (1994)	Peak position
Australia (ARIA)	125
Canada Top Singles (RPM)	10
Scottish Singles Sales (Official Charts)	66
UK Singles (Official Charts)	79
UK Rock & Metal (Official Charts)	7
US Billboard Hot 100	33
US Album Rock Tracks (Billboard)	5
US Modern Rock Tracks (Billboard)	1

=== Year-end charts ===
Chart (1994)	Position
Canada Top Singles (RPM)	76
US Album Rock Tracks (Billboard)	27
US Modern Rock Tracks (Billboard)	5

== Release history ==
Region	Date	Format(s)	Label(s)	Ref.
United States	April 1994	College; alternative; triple A radio	Columbia	
United States	June 1994	Top 40 radio	Columbia	
Australia	June 13, 1994	CD; cassette	Columbia	
United Kingdom	October 3, 1994	CD; cassette	Columbia	
