= Glen Phillips (singer) =

American musician (born 1970)

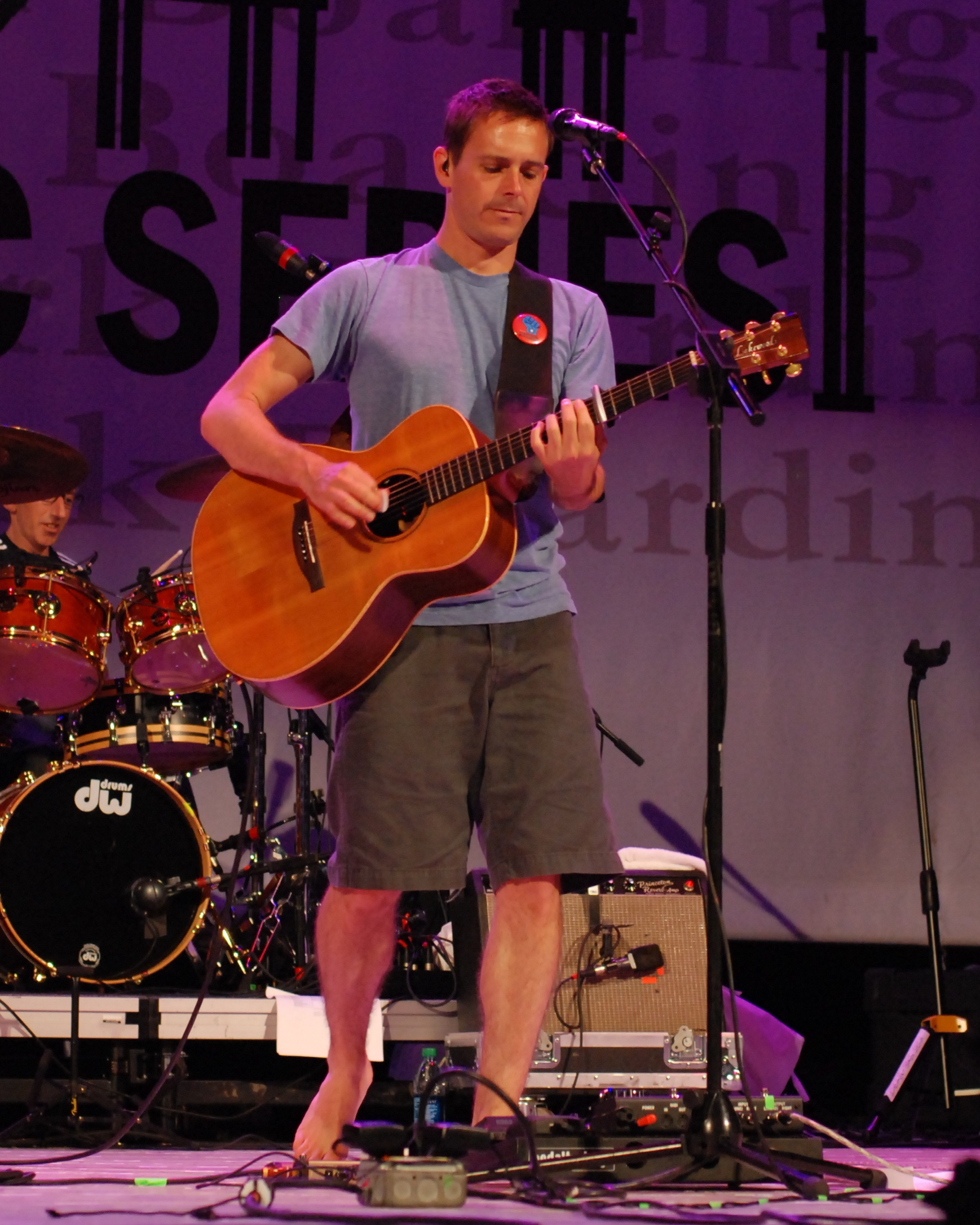
- Phillips at the Lowell Summer Music Series, August 2011

Background information
- Born: December 29, 1970 (age 55); Santa Barbara, California, U.S.
- Genres: Alternative rock, rock, folk rock
- Instruments: Vocals, guitar, mandolin, keyboards
- Years active: 1985–present
- Label: Columbia
- Website: www.glenphillips.com

Glen Phillips (born December 29, 1970) is an American songwriter, lyricist, singer and guitarist. He is the lead singer and songwriter of the alternative rock group Toad the Wet Sprocket and also records and performs as a solo artist.

== Biography ==
=== Early life ===
Phillips was born to a Reform Jewish family in Santa Barbara, California. His father was a college professor who taught physics. Although his family was Jewish, with Glen having a Bar Mitzvah, his family was secular and his father took him to meditation classes.

Phillips attended San Marcos High School, where he was a part of choir and theatre. He originally envisioned becoming a teacher. He began to make music at 14 years old. Phillips took the California High School Proficiency Exam so he could graduate early.

=== Career ===
Phillips formed Toad the Wet Sprocket in 1986, at the age of 15, with friends from his high school.

In 1991, at age 20, Phillips wrote the song "All I Want".

The band recorded five albums but broke up in 1998, after escalating tensions, shortly after Phillips' father died of colon cancer.

During his time in Toad the Wet Sprocket, Phillips was involved in a pop rock project called Flapping, Flapping, which released the album Montgomery Street in 1996.

In 2001, three years after the breakup of Toad, Phillips released his first solo album, Abulum. This was followed up by a self-released live album and solo touring, along with a reunion tour with his former Toad bandmates.

In 2004, Phillips released a collaboration with Nickel Creek, under the name Mutual Admiration Society. The self-titled album had been recorded in 2000 and featured songs written by both Phillips alone and as collaborative efforts, and was released on Sugar Hill Records.

In 2005, Phillips returned to a major label via Universal Music Group's imprint Lost Highway Records and released the critically acclaimed Winter Pays For Summer. The album included the radio single "Duck and Cover," but Phillips and the label parted ways due to creative differences. A compilation of six outtakes from the album were published as an EP titled Unlucky 7, the first track ("The Hole") of which was featured in the second episode of the AMC television series Breaking Bad.

Phillips released his third proper solo album, Mr. Lemons in the spring of 2006.

In 2007, Phillips reunited with Sara Watkins and Sean Watkins of Nickel Creek as well as Grant-Lee Phillips and Luke Bulla to perform as part of The Various & Sundry Tour.

In January 2008, Phillips released an EP Secrets of the New Explorers, with music influenced by Talk Talk and Peter Gabriel.

In January 2008, Phillips formed the supergroup Works Progress Administration (W.P.A.) featuring Phillips, Sean Watkins (guitar), his sister Sara Watkins (fiddle), Benmont Tench (piano), Luke Bulla (fiddle), Greg Leisz (various), Pete Thomas (drums), and Davey Faragher (bass). The group released an album in 2009.

In 2008, under the moniker Plover, Phillips recorded an album with Neilson Hubbard and Garrison Starr.

In 2009, Phillips recorded a cover version of The Beatles' song "I'll Follow the Sun" for the soundtrack of the film Imagine That.

In April 2018, Phillips signed with Compass Records Group. His 2016 album, Swallowed By the New, was re-released on May 4, 2018, with a new bonus track "Nobody's Gonna Get Hurt".

== Personal life ==
Phillips and his ex-wife, Laurel, whom he was married to from 1989 to 2014, have three daughters.

On October 8, 2008, Phillips injured his arm while at a friend's house, where he was sitting on a glass coffee table that collapsed when he moved back. Phillips had surgery to repair a damaged ulnar nerve and muscle in his left arm. His ability to play guitar was hampered during his recovery, but he toured despite the injury.

Phillips has suffered from depression.

Phillips is known for performing barefoot.

== Discography ==
=== Studio albums ===
- Abulum (Unami Records, 2001)
- Winter Pays for Summer (Lost Highway Records, 2004)
- Unlucky 7 (2006, independent)
- Mr. Lemons (Unami Music, 2005)
- Secrets of the New Explorers (2008, independent)
- Tornillo (2010, independent) – recorded in 2002 with producer David Garza but scrapped in favor of making "Winter Pays For Summer" with John Fields.
- Coyote Sessions (2012, independent) – compilation of previously unreleased songs, recorded live in studio with one central microphone
- Options – B-sides & Demos (2014, Umami Music) – primarily outtakes from the 2003–2004 "Winter Pays For Summer"
- Swallowed by the New (Compass Records, 2016)
- There Is So Much Here (Compass Records, 2022)

=== Other releases ===
- Live at Largo (Unami, 2002)
- Connect Sets (2005) – recorded live in studio to support Winter Pays for Summer
- Live at the Belly Up (2016, Belly Up Live)

=== With Toad The Wet Sprocket ===
- Bread & Circus (1989)
- Pale (1989)
- fear (1991)
- Dulcinea (1994)
- In Light Syrup (1995)
- Coil (1997)
- New Constellation (2013)
- Starting Now (2021)
- Rings (The Acoustic Sessions) (2026)

=== With flapping, Flapping ===
- Montgomery Street (1996)

=== With Lapdog ===
- Near Tonight (2000)
- Mayfly (2002)

=== With Mutual Admiration Society ===
- Mutual Admiration Society (2004)

=== With Plover ===
- Plover (2008)

=== With RemoteTreeChildren ===
- Veteran of the Loudness Wars (2008)

=== With Works Progress Administration ===
- WPA (2009)
