= Outside Child =

Studio album by Allison Russell
- Released: May 21, 2021
- Recorded: September 2019
- Studio: Sound Emporium (Nashville, Tennessee)
- Genre: Americana, folk
- Length: 49:04
- Label: Fantasy; Concord
- Producer: Dan Knobler

Allison Russell chronology
Outside Child (2021)	The Returner (2023)

Singles from Outside Child
- 1. "Nightflyer" Released: March 19, 2021; 2. "Persephone" Released: April 16, 2021; 3. "Montreal" Released: April 30, 2021; 4. "The Runner" Released: May 14, 2021

Professional ratings
Aggregate scores
Source	Rating
Metacritic	86/100
Review scores
Source	Rating
AllMusic	4.5/5 stars
Rolling Stone	Positive
Variety	Positive
NPR	Positive
American Songwriter	Positive

Outside Child is the debut album by Canadian singer-songwriter, poet, activist and multi-instrumentalist Allison Russell. Produced by Dan Knobler and released by Fantasy Records on May 21, 2021, it is Russell's first release as a solo artist following two decades of performing and releasing music as a member of the groups Po' Girl, Birds of Chicago and Our Native Daughters. Lyrically, the album details Russell's experiences with the abuse she endured as a child at the hands of her stepfather, with The New York Times describing it as “a harrowing story of survivor's joy” and Russell herself stating that “the record itself isn't really about abuse. It's about the journey out of that, and breaking those cycles. It is about resilience, survival, transcendence, the redemptive power of art, community, connection, and chosen family”.

The album received critical acclaim from music critics and was listed on numerous 2021 "best of" lists, receiving three nominations at the 64th Annual Grammy Awards. Outside Child won the Americana Music Association's award for 2022 Album of the Year.

== Background ==
Writing for what would eventually become Outside Child began on the tour bus that Russell shared with Amythyst Kiah, Leyla McCalla, Rhiannon Giddens during the tour to support the 2019 albumSongs of Our Native Daughters, with Russell and her husband former bandmate JT Nero sharing song ideas online. Recording Songs of Our Native Daughters helped to inspire Russell, who explained that “The history that we were excavating on that project really made me understand my own history within the context of this continuum. Bigotry and abuse are intergenerational traumas. It’s not just my story.” The process of writing the album was revelatory for Russell, who noted that “It was this awakening, to reclaim a part of yourself that has been just about pain and shame and misery.”

Russell had hinted at the physical, mental and sexual abuse she had suffered when she was younger in some of her previous songs, including "Part Time Poppa" and "Corner Talk" from Po' Girl's 2004 Vagabond Lullabies album. After finding out that her niece and nephew would be moving in with her mother and stepfather, Russell filed rape and assault charges against her adoptive father despite knowing how unlikely it would be that he would be convicted. When other women substantiated Russell's allegations, her stepfather pled guilty, receiving only a three-year sentence with a chance of parole, leading Po' Girl to release the track "No Shame" in 2009. Reflecting upon these exceptional references to her past, Russell stated that “at that time I was trying to do something I wasn’t yet ready to do” and that “the first time I started trying to write what had happened to me to kind of exorcise it out of me like a demon” but that she was added that she was writing “very third-person, very 'It's not me; it's a character”. The progress made by society caused her to reconsider her reluctance, explaining in an interview that “I really feel the difference going through this process now. There are conversations that we’re having in the mainstream now that we just were not having. There wasn’t this network of survivors that we have now, there wasn’t #MeToo then. And I’m a mother now, and that has changed everything. That has given me a layer of bravery and armor”.

When she moved to Nashville from England, singer-songwriter Yola befriended Russell during the development of Outside Child and Yola explained that “when we were hanging out, there was this process of getting ready to tell this story. We’d definitely have conversations where we worked on that strength and that sense of daring to exist, daring to be your most self, to speak your truthiest truth. It’s really beautiful to watch her come to this place where she’s like, now’s the time.”

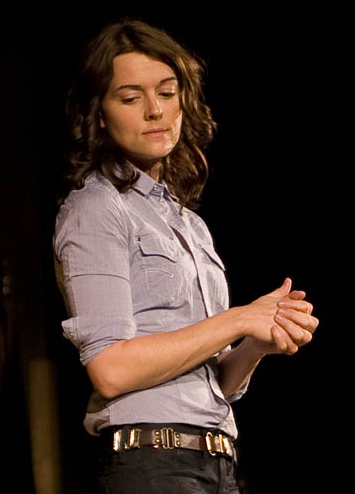
Brandi Carlile was instrumental in the album's release.

The album was recorded during Americanafest in September 2019, where Russell was able to invite Yola and The McCrary Sisters to provide guest vocals. Funding for the album was granted by the Canada Council of the Arts and Russell recorded the album with producer Dan Knobler over a period of just four days with only three or four takes per song and with a full band in the studio. Russell found the recording process both emotional and healing in equal measure, noting that “We were laughing, we were crying. And the communion between musicians, I hope people can hear that on the record. It felt like magic”. Speaking of the McMcrary Sisters, whom Russell contacted through their friendship with Yola, Russell explained that she had been a fan of them since she had moved to Nashville and “reached out to them thinking I wouldn’t be able to afford them and they were so generous. They came and sang for way less than they are worth and worked within my budget. I was honored that they came”. She noted that, once she had assembled her team of collaborators, she was able to stand back and allow the music to flow, stating “it was really a matter of casting the room and then letting people shine the way they do”.

Prior to release, Russell shared the album with several close friends and confidantes including Brandi Carlile, who was "blown away" by it and expressed that "I remember thinking, this is one of the best conceptual albums I've ever heard". Carlile called Fantasy Records, with whom she had a working relationship following her production of While I'm Livin' by Tanya Tucker, and played them Outside Child which resulted in them signing Russell and releasing the album.

Russell stated that "One of the things that I think we don't talk about as survivors is the extreme joy that comes when you are over on the other side. Part of putting this record out is just wanting to show that there's a road map. You are not defined by your scars. You are not defined by what you've lost. You are not defined by what someone did to you. Yes, that's a part of the story. That's a part of who you become. But it doesn't define you."

== Composition ==
=== Lyrics ===
Opening track "Montreal" was described as a “gentle thank you to a benevolent city”, referencing how Russell felt that the city protected her from harm when she ran away from home at age fifteen and had to sleep in cemeteries, cafes and McGill University where she went to school. Talking about "Montreal", Russell explained that “in this track, I give thanks for my wondrous hometown of Montreal. I was a teenage runaway – I believe in many ways the City herself protected me. I wandered the Mountain at all hours and slept in the graveyard in the summertime. I haunted the Cathedrals and slept in the pews. Sometimes I stayed up all night playing chess with the old men in the 24 hr. cafes. I got to hear Oscar Peterson play for free in the park during Jazz Fest… I was very lucky to grow up there.”

The album's first single, "Nightflyer" was inspired by an ancient Gnostic poem titled "The Thunder, Perfect Mind", which Russell read when she was sixteen, noting that “it’s an exhortatory poem discovered among the Gnostic manuscripts in the Nag Hammadi library in the 40’s. It has never left me. I’ve been meditating on the nature of resilience, endurance, and grace more deeply since becoming a mother. I was trying to bridge the divide and embrace shame and my inner divinity equally with this piece”. Of the song, she added that “in a way it’s rooted in the pain of the past, but it’s clear that the protagonist — who’s me, of course — is not trapped in that situation anymore. It’s about breaking the cycle of abuse”.

"Persephone", named after the Greek mythological figure, details Russell's relationship with a young woman during her teenage years who offered refuge, solace and a brief respite from the abusive life she was experiencing at home. Russell stated that the song is “an homage to my first love – she helped me through my early days of being a teenage runaway and taught me that people can be kind… It’s about the healing joy of experiencing a consensual sexual awakening after a decade of abuse – and about the transformative rebirth that is possible when we begin to love and be loved with mutual care, respect and honesty”.

"4th Day Prayer" was the first track that Russell wrote for Outside Child and she told No Depression that the idea came to her while trying to find clean clothes for her daughter Ida on the tour bus in the middle of the night while trying not to wake up her bandmates or their children and how she remembered thinking that “I and my daughter were surrounded by this beautiful wolfpack of wild, wonderful women, and I was so lucky to be in this situation. I thought about every single woman before me who didn’t have this level of support like I had with my native daughters and with an incredibly loving partner and being equal in raising our daughter, writing together” and how this contrasted with her teen years, where she was being raped and tortured every day while her school friends around her were talking about how they were the best years of their lives.

Russell described the album's fifth track, "The Runner", which features her “chosen sister” Yola on harmony vocals, as a song “about music saving my life and setting me on the path to healing and freedom”.

"Hy-Brasil" is named after the mythical island of the same name and casts Hy-Brasil as the spiritual home to which Russell's soul would travel to escape the mental abuse. It draws on Russell's Scottish heritage and acts as a tribute to her grandmother, Dr. Isobel Roger-Robertson, whom Russell describes as the “brightest light of my childhood”.

The seventh track, "The Hunters", is based on Russell's experiences using literature and fantasy as a form of escapism to deal with the physical side of her abuse, with Russell pointing out that the song is an homage to shapeshifting during those years.

"All of the Women", one of the few songs on the album written solely by Russell, is similar in theme to "Corner Talk", a track that appeared on Vagabond Lullabies, a 2004 album by Russell's former band Po' Girl and details the story of a local prostitute whom Russell was both enamored with and concerned for as a child and is partially inspired by the work Russell did with homeless girls after beginning her own process of healing. The track features harmony vocals from renowned gospel group The McCrary Sisters, who represent the security provided by supportive women that Russell did not have as a child but has gained as an adult.

"Poison Arrow", the album's ninth track, has been described as “the candid confessions of a woman who's gone through many hellish experiences and come through it with uncommon grace”.

The album's closing track, "Joyful Motherfuckers", is a duet between Russell and her husband JT Nero and a cathartic track offering a prayer of forgiveness for her father’s brutality and a hymn to the soothing love of her spouse and extended family, with the pair singing of “hopeful sinners, true forgivers, the courageous, and the lovers — shouting out loud for all to hear the power of love to conquer hate”.

=== Themes ===
Though primarily sung in English, Russell sings certain words or lyrics in French and noted in interviews that she sings in whatever way feels natural at the time.

Several tracks on the album make reference to the "jackal", which is Russell's descriptor for her adoptive father.

=== Music ===
Outside Child is an americana album, drawing inspiration from a range of roots music genres including folk, blues, soul, roots rock, jazz, gospel, country, Appalachian and old-time music. The music has been described as “lustrous and diverse, from the churning minor-key rock of "The Runner" to the eerie, feedback-edged “Hy Brasil” to "The Hunters", which has a hint of Caribbean lilt”, the “gospel-y "Nightflyter"” and the “country-tinged "Persephone"”.

== Track listing ==
Outside Child track listing
No.	Title	Writer(s)	Length
1.	"Montreal"	Allison Russell; Jeremy Lindsay; JT Nero	3:45
2.	"Nightflyer"	Russell; Lindsay; Nero	4:55
3.	"Persephone"	Russell; Lindsay	4:22
4.	"4th Day Prayer"	Russell; Lindsay; Nero	4:11
5.	"The Runner"	Russell; Lindsay; Nero	4:09
6.	"Hy-Brasil"	Russell; Lindsay; Nero	5:35
7.	"The Hunters"	Russell; Lindsay; Nero	5:32
8.	"All of the Women"	Russell	5:24
9.	"Poison Arrow"	Russell; Lindsay; Nero	3:58
10.	"Little Rebirth"	Russell	4:02
11.	"Joyful Motherfuckers"	Russell; Lindsay; Nero	3:11
Total length:			49:04

== Personnel ==
Credits adapted from AllMusic.

- Marc Baptiste - photography
- Jason Burger - drums, percussion
- Steve Dawson - pedal steel
- Jamie Dick - drums, percussion
- Tom Dolan - layout, typography
- Dan Knobler - production, banjo, engineering, guitar, mellotron, mixing, slide guitar, synthesizer
- Drew Lindsay - guitar, mellotron, organ, piano, wurlitzer
- The McCrary Sisters - harmony vocals (track 8)
- Chris Merrill - bass
- Ruth Moody - harmony vocals
- JT Nero - acoustic guitar, guest vocals (track 11)
- Joe Pisapia - acoustic guitar, electric guitar
- Erin Rae - harmony vocals
- Kim Rosen - mastering
- Allison Russell - lead vocals, banjo, clarinet, harmony vocals
- Jake Sherman - organ
- Kevin Sokolnicki - engineering
- Yola - harmony vocals (track 5)

== Critical reception ==
Outside Child was met with widespread critical acclaim. At Metacritic, which assigns a normalized rating out of 100 to reviews from mainstream publications, the album received an average score of 86, based on 4 reviews.

Despite the heavy subject matter, Jon Pareles of The New York Times described it as “an album of strength and affirmation, not victimization”. Chris Willman of Variety stated that “Russell's solo debut reaches back into the details of an unspeakably abusive upbringing for an almost indescribably rewarding album” and adding that “It might be premature to proclaim Allison Russell’s solo debut the album of the year but Outside Child sure has the inside track. With 2021 not yet at the halfway point, it’s hard to imagine many other albums coming along that could match the combination of emotional potency, melodic fluency, social significance and heartrending beauty in Russell’s retelling of a lifetime’s worth of debasement and self-reclamation. Musical memoirs don’t come braver, or better”. Willman praised Outside Child for the “unsentimental uplift infused throughout” and “smart musical choices”, summarizing that “Russell, her co-writer/husband JT Nero and producer Dan Knobler employ a variety of styles and moods that make the album feel like a 50-minute epic journey with lots of small salvations and micro-empowerments on the way to a well-healed close” and praising the sonic mix of genres.

== Awards and nominations ==
Year	Association	Award	Nominated work	Result	Ref.
2021	Polaris Music Prize		Outside Child	Nominated	
2022	Grammy Awards	Best Americana Album	Outside Child	Nominated	
2022	Grammy Awards	Best American Roots Song	"Nightflyer"	Nominated	
2022	Grammy Awards	Best American Roots Performance	"Nightflyer"	Nominated	
2022	UK Americana Music Awards	International Album of the Year	Outside Child	Won	
2022	Canadian Folk Music Awards	Contemporary Album of the Year	Outside Child	Won	
2022	Juno Awards	Songwriter of the Year	"4th Day Prayer", "Montreal", "Nightflyer"	Nominated	
2022	Juno Awards	Contemporary Roots Album of the Year	Outside Child	Won	
2022	Folk Alliance Awards	Album of the Year	Outside Child	Won	
2022	Americana Music Honors & Awards	Album of the Year	Outside Child	Won	
2022	Americana Music Honors & Awards	Song of the Year	"Persephone"	Nominated	
