= The Returner (album) =

Studio album by Allison Russell
- Released: September 8, 2023
- Recorded: December 2022
- Studios: Henson, Hollywood
- Genres: R&B, Americana
- Length: 44:01
- Labels: Fantasy; Concord
- Producers: Dan Knobler; Allison Russell; Dim Star

Allison Russell chronology
Outside Child (2021)	The Returner (2023)	In the Hour of Chaos (2026)

Singles from The Returner
- 1. "The Returner" Released: June 6, 2023; 2. "Stay Right Here" Released: July 14, 2023; 3. "Snakelife" Released: August 11, 2023

The Returner is the second studio album by Canadian singer-songwriter, poet, activist and multi-instrumentalist Allison Russell. Produced by Russell, Dan Knobler and Dim Star (JT Nero and Drew Lindsay), it was released by Fantasy Records on September 8, 2023, as the follow-up to Russell's award-winning debut Outside Child. It was preceded by three singles: the title track, "Stay Right Here", and "Snakelife". Russell described the album as "about being here now, and being consciously celebratory of the fact that we get to be here now, that every single one of us breathing and present on the planet has survived the pandemic, has survived all kinds of things, and we're here and we're together and we can dance and we can have joy."

The album was promoted by a European tour supporting Hozier alongside various solo festival appearances, followed by an extensive US headlining tour beginning in October and continuing into early 2024 with dates in the UK, Ireland and Canada.

The album received four nominations at the 66th Annual Grammy Awards, including Best Americana Album, with the title track being nominated for both Best American Roots Song, and Best Americana Performance. "Eve Was Black" won in the Best American Roots Performance category, Russell's first Grammy win.

The album was a shortlisted finalist for the 2024 Polaris Music Prize.

== Background ==
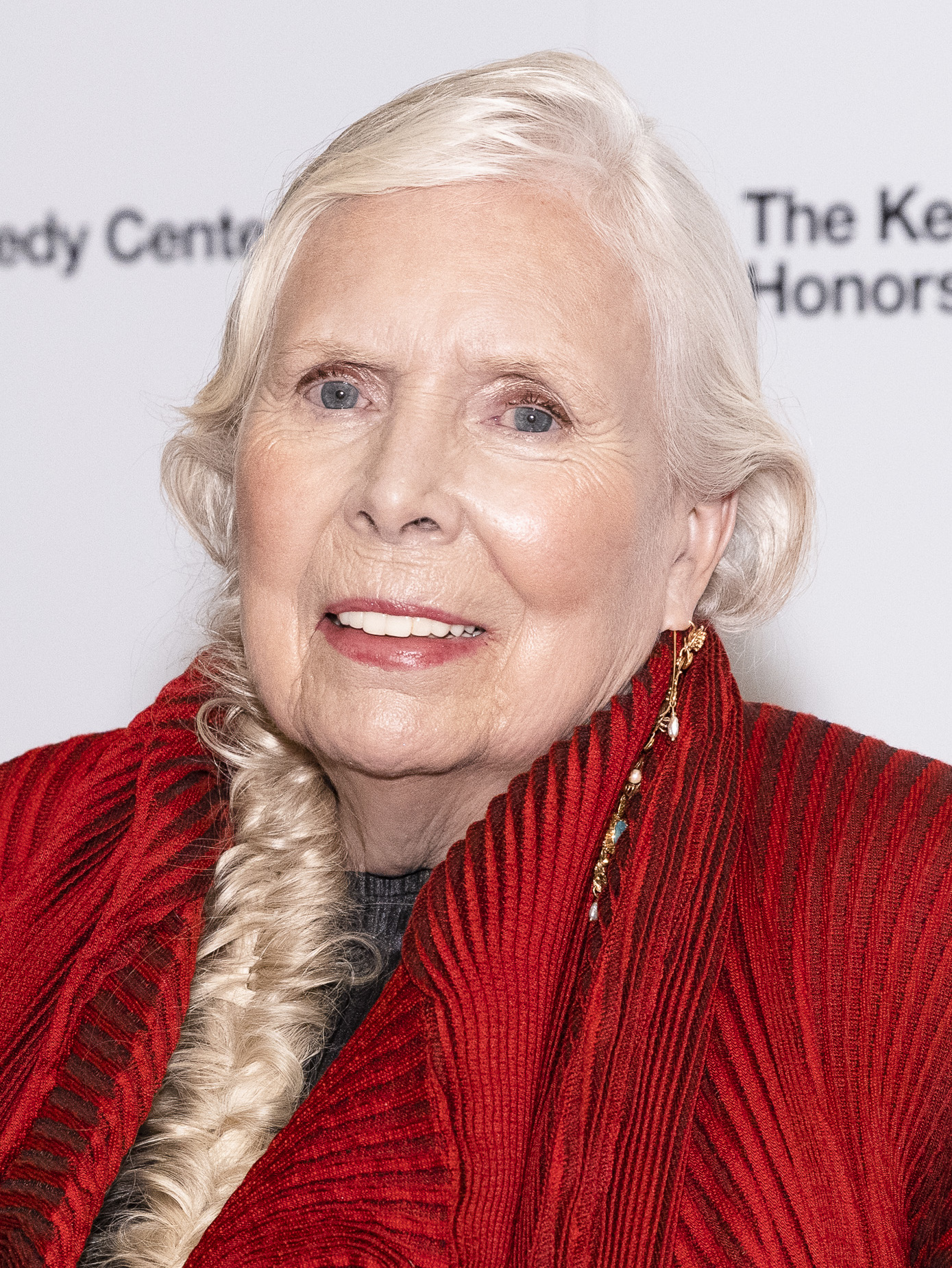
The album's title was inspired by Joni Mitchell.

When working on her second album, Russell sought to take a break from the "harrowing", personal topics explored on Outside Child, and instead focus on grooves and celebration, with Russell explaining "I thought about returning, and what that means to me. And I thought about survivors' joy, and how we don't talk about that enough." She noted that the album's title was inspired by Joni Mitchell, whom she had befriended through their shared association with Brandi Carlile, stating "I wrote a poem about Joni, and in the poem I called her 'Our Lady Returner.' I thought about how much grit and grace that she has as a human being to be able to come back from death, not once, but three times, and to relearn not just how to sing and play, but how to walk and talk. That was such a moving, intense experience that had many layers to me," adding that she feels the meaning of the title will change continuously for both herself and the listeners as they go through different experiences in their lives. Russell also noted that the lyrics of the album are less autobiographical than Outside Child, explaining "You can take deep dives on these songs if you want to, but you don't have to. You can just feel them, too. You know, these songs move. This is about being back in your own body and celebrating that. It's like a celebratory soundtrack for getting tired of hating yourself and deciding you're worthy. [...] I hope people feel some of the joy in this record."

Russell stated that "the way that this record was born was so joyful and so intentional" in contrast to Outside Child where she struggled with feelings of denial, unworthiness and the fear of stepping forward and telling her own story, noting that "coming into this record, 'The Returner,' we've been for the last two years having people celebrating the music, and me finding my community and chosen family and a Rainbow Coalition circle growing bigger and bigger. It's been unprecedented in my life, all these magical secret garden doors opening." Russell explained that working with Lindsay on production helped to influence the more grooving tracks on the album, joking that "it was so much fun to kind of bust out of the roots ghetto that I sometimes get lost in. My default is often to go the murder ballad route or something. And having Drew imagine these grooving tracks for banjo-driven pieces that I had written was so exciting and freeing, and it took my imagination in different places."

=== Recording ===
The album was recorded across six days before Christmas at Henson Recording Studios in Los Angeles, California. The recording was initially supposed to take place in February 2023 but was brought forward to allow enough time for the album to be pressed. Discussing the influence of this change, Russell explained "it was down to scheduling, and then we realised what was happening. It's winter solstice, this is an incredible, meaningful, deep, renewing time of year and here we are, sixteen women, three chosen brothers, we have six days and we're conjuring this thing together. It was like fate, we couldn't have been more in the flow together, with the earth." Prior to the sessions, Russell worked on the songs alone during her walks in a park near her home in Nashville until she felt comfortable enough to share them with her collaborators, who would then work with her to flesh them out in the studio. Russell described this as a fluid process, explaining "We were definitely giving each other feedback as we played in the studio, but the way I like to work is circle-work, it's not a hierarchy, it's not my way or the highway. We are creating this together, and it needs to feel good for everybody. The limitations are sometimes what creates the greatest inspiration and synergy. We can't overthink things, we've got to feel it, and when it feels right we leave it alone. That's how I approach things. I'm not interested in perfection, I'm allergic to perfection."

=== Singles ===
Discussing the title track, which was released alongside the album's announcement on June 6, 2023, Russell explained "My goal with The Returner – sonically, poetically, and spiritually – is a radical reclamation of the present tense, a real time union of body, mind, and soul. This album is a much deeper articulation of rhythm, groove, and syncopation. Groove as it heralds the self back into the body, groove as it celebrates sensual and sexual agency and flowering, groove as an urgent call to action and political activism. In just a word, it's funkier. But as is the history of anything funky, it's never just a party. It is a multiverse of energies that merges the celebration and the battle cry. For while an embrace of the present tense is a celebration, it is equally an unquestioning leap into battle – cultural, political, environmental."

The second single, "Stay Right Here", was released on July 14, 2023. Of the song, Russell stated "'Stay Right Here' is about resisting the siren songs of self-hatred, apathy & oblivion. It's about fighting the nihilistic forces of bigotry, fear & fascism. Right here, right now. The good fight, good trouble, it's a Freedom Song. It's about leaning into the fierce Survivor's Joy & the power of our worldwide rainbow coalition to reduce harm for all our children, for our planet, for all those yet to come. We are more than seeds – we're the soil & the water – the good ancestors. Every one of us, equal under the sun— we shall not be overcome. Our Circle is strong." It was described by Fantasy Records as "an urgent dancefloor gem" that channels Diana Ross, Gloria Gaynor and Roberta Flack.

The album's third single, "Snakelife", was released on August 11, 2023, and was described as a "haunting meditation on transformation" and contains the lyrics which Russell has referred to as the album's thesis: "I used to dream, but now I write, I wield my words like spindles bright; To weave a world where every child Is safe and loved; And Black is beautiful and good."

== Track listing ==
All tracks are written by Allison Russell, Drew Lindsay and JT Nero.

The Returner track listing
No.	Title	Length
1.	"Springtime"	4:11
2.	"The Returner"	3:50
3.	"All Without Within"	3:12
4.	"Demons"	4:29
5.	"Eve Was Black"	6:04
6.	"Stay Right Here"	4:09
7.	"Shadowlands"	4:13
8.	"Rag Child"	3:03
9.	"Snakelife"	4:37
10.	"Requiem"	6:13
Total length:		44:01

== Personnel ==
- Allison Russell – vocals, banjo, clarinet, guitar, production
- Brandon Bell – recording, mixing
- Brandi Carlile – backing vocals (tracks 2 and 10)
- Brandy Clark – backing vocals (track 10)
- Dan Knobler – production
- Drew Lindsay – production
- Elenna Canlas
- Elizabeth Pupo-Walker
- Ganessa James
- Hozier – backing vocals (track 10)
- Joy Clark – guitar
- JT Nero – production
- Kerenza Peacock
- Larissa Maestro – cello
- Lisa Coleman – piano, keyboard
- Mandy Fer – electric guitar
- Meg Coleman
- Meg McCormick
- SistaStrings (Monique and Chauntee Ross) – violin and cello
- Wendy Melvoin – guitar, bass, drums
- Wiktoria Bialic – drums and percussion

== Charts ==
Chart performance for The Returner
Chart (2023)	Peak position
UK Album Downloads (Official Charts)	56
