= 2021 Americana Music Honors & Awards =

Americana Music Honors & Awards

- Date: September 22, 2021
- Location: Ryman Auditorium; Nashville, Tennessee

Highlights
- Most nominations: Jason Isbell (3)
- Website: americanamusic.org/awards

Television/radio coverage
- Network: Circle, PBS,

The 2021 Americana Music Honors & Awards, 20th ceremony, were held on Wednesday, September 22, 2021, at Ryman Auditorium the in Nashville, Tennessee. The marquee event for the Americana Music Association, artists are awarded for outstanding achievements in the music industry. This was the first ceremony to be held since 2019, following the cancellation of the 2020 awards due to the COVID-19 pandemic. The show was broadcast on Circle in the US for the first time and was also available to watch in its entirety on Facebook, alongside a highlights show that aired on PBS as part of Austin City Limits.

== Performers ==
Artist(s)	Song(s)
Aaron Lee Tasjan	Tribute to Charlie Watts "Can't You Hear Me Knocking"
Allison Russell	"Nightflyer"
Aoife O'Donovan Joe Henry	Tribute to Nanci Griffith "Gulf Coast Highway"
Amythyst Kiah	"Fancy Drones"
Keb' Mo'	"Oklahoma"
Jason Isbell Amanda Shires	"Letting You Go"
Charley Crockett	"Are We Lonesome Yet"
Sarah Jarosz	"I'll Be Gone"
The Highwomen Yola	"Highwomen"
Fisk Jubilee Singers	"I Believe"
Buddy Miller	Tribute to Tom T. Hall "That's How I Got to Memphis"
Steve Earle	"Harlem River Blues"
Margo Price	"I'd Die For You"
Valerie June Carla Thomas Vaneese Thomas	"Call Me a Fool" "B-A-B-Y"
The Mavericks	
Brandi Carlile Margo Price Amanda Shires	Tribute to John Prine "I Remember Everything"
Brandi Carlile	"Right on Time"
Emmylou Harris Rodney Crowell	Tribute to The Everly Brothers "Let It Be Me" "Bye Bye Love"

== Winners and nominees ==
Winners in Bold.

Artist of the Year	Album of the Year
**Brandi Carlile**; Kathleen Edwards; Jason Isbell; Margo Price; Billy Strings	**Cuttin' Grass - Vol. 1 (Butcher Shoppe Sessions)** — **Sturgill Simpson**; J.T. — Steve Earle & The Dukes; The Moon And Stars: Prescriptions For Dreamers — Valerie June; Reunions — Jason Isbell and the 400 Unit; World On The Ground — Sarah Jarosz
Song of the Year	Emerging Act of the Year
**"I Remember Everything" — Pat McLaughlin & John Prine**; "Black Myself" — Amythyst Kiah; "Call Me A Fool" — Valerie June; "Dreamsicle" — Jason Isbell; "Long Violent History" — Tyler Childers	**Charley Crockett**; Amythyst Kiah; Joy Oladokun; Allison Russell; Waxahatchee
Duo/Group of the Year	Instrumentalist of the Year
**Black Pumas**; The Highwomen; Our Native Daughters; The War and Treaty; Gillian Welch and David Rawlings	**Kristin Weber**; Megan Coleman; Robbie Crowell; Ray Jacildo; Philip Towns

== Honors ==
=== Americana Trailblazer Award ===
- The Mavericks

=== Free Speech Award/Inspiration Award ===
- Carla Thomas

=== Lifetime Achievement Award for Performance ===
- Keb' Mo'

=== Lifetime Achievement Award for Producer/Engineer ===
- Trina Shoemaker

=== Legacy of Americana Award ===
- Fisk Jubilee Singers

== Presenters ==
- Brandi Carlile
- Sarah Jarosz
- Joe Henry
- Ketch Secor
- Sheryl Crow
- Bruce Robison
- Rodney Crowell
- Aoife O'Donovan
- Keifer Sutherland
- Allison Russell
- Valerie June
- Tony Brown
- Shooter Jennings
- Yola
- Anthony Mason
