= Allison Russell =

Canadian singer-songwriter, musician and activist

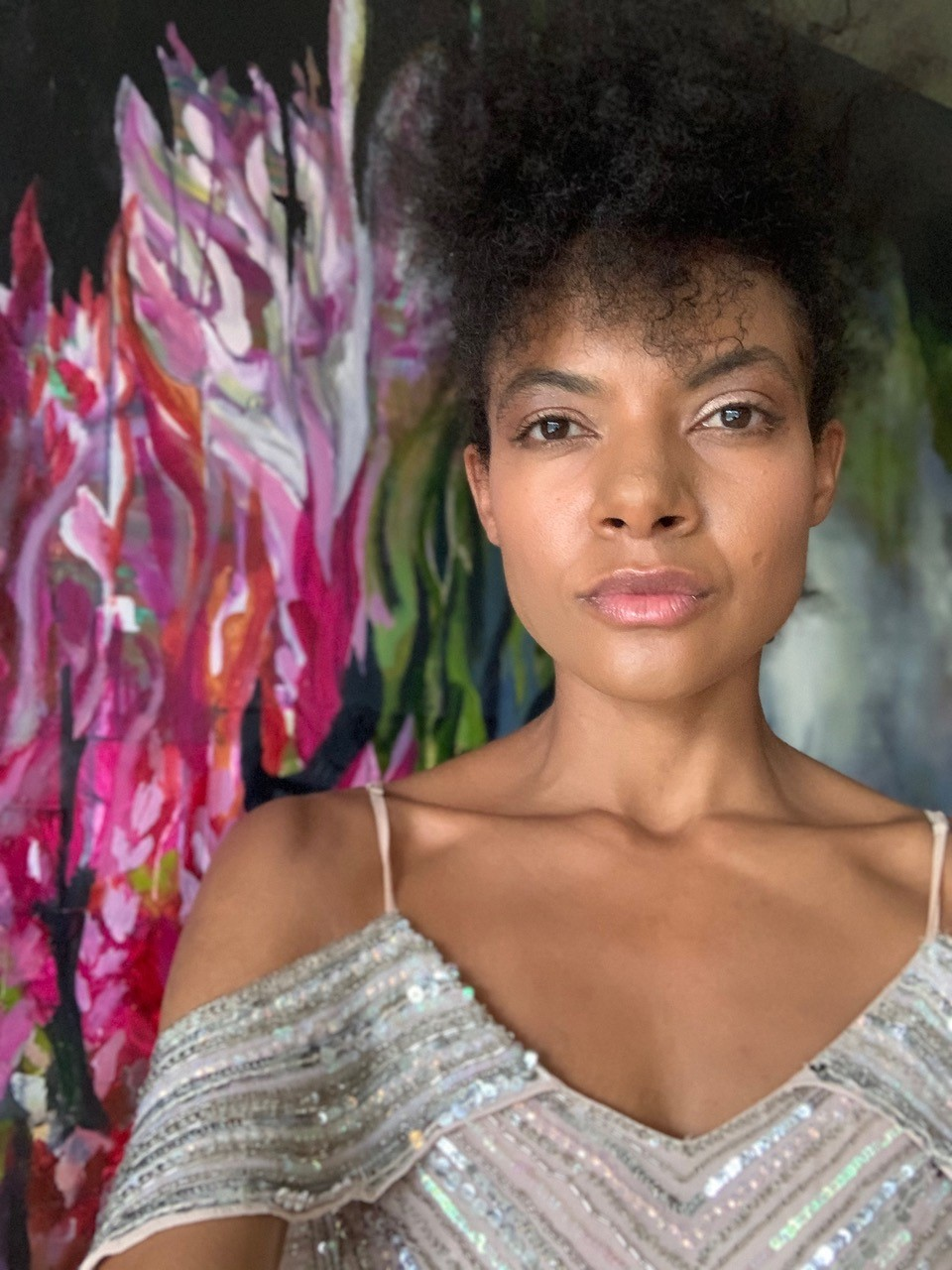
- Russell in 2021

Background information
- Born: Montreal, Quebec, Canada
- Genres: Americana; folk
- Instruments: Vocals; guitar; banjo; clarinet
- Years active: 1999–present
- Label: Fantasy
- Member of: Birds of Chicago; Po' Girl; Our Native Daughters
- Website: allisonrussellmusic.com

Allison Russell is a Canadian singer, songwriter, musician, actress and activist.

Prior to her solo music career, Russell performed as a member of various music groups including Po' Girl, Birds of Chicago, Our Native Daughters, and Sisters of the Strawberry Moon. She released her first solo album, Outside Child, in 2021. The album was nominated for a 2022 Grammy Award in the Best Americana Album category, and the single "Nightflyer" was nominated for both the Best American Roots Performance (Russell) and Best American Roots Song (Russell and Jeremy Lindsay, co-writers).

Her second album, The Returner was released in September 2023. The album received four Grammy Award nominations including Best Americana Album, Best American Roots Song and Best Americana Performance for the album's title track "The Returner". It also won the Grammy Award for Best American Roots Performance for the single "Eve Was Black".

Russell has received a total of eight Grammy nominations (with one win), four Canadian Folk Music Awards and two Juno Awards and has been named to the long list for the Polaris Music Prize in 2021, and shortlisted for the 2024 award.

== Early life and education ==
Russell was born in Montreal to a Grenadian father and a Scottish-Canadian teenage single mother. Her mother struggled with postpartum depression and schizophrenia, and Russell was initially placed in foster care. Her mother regained custody of her after marrying a white-supremacist American expatriate. From the ages of 5 to 15, she was physically and sexually abused by her adoptive father. At the age of 15, Russell ran away from home, eventually moving to Vancouver in 1998. She attended Dawson College.

== Career ==
Russell was initially a member of the Vancouver-based Celtic folk band Fear of Drinking.

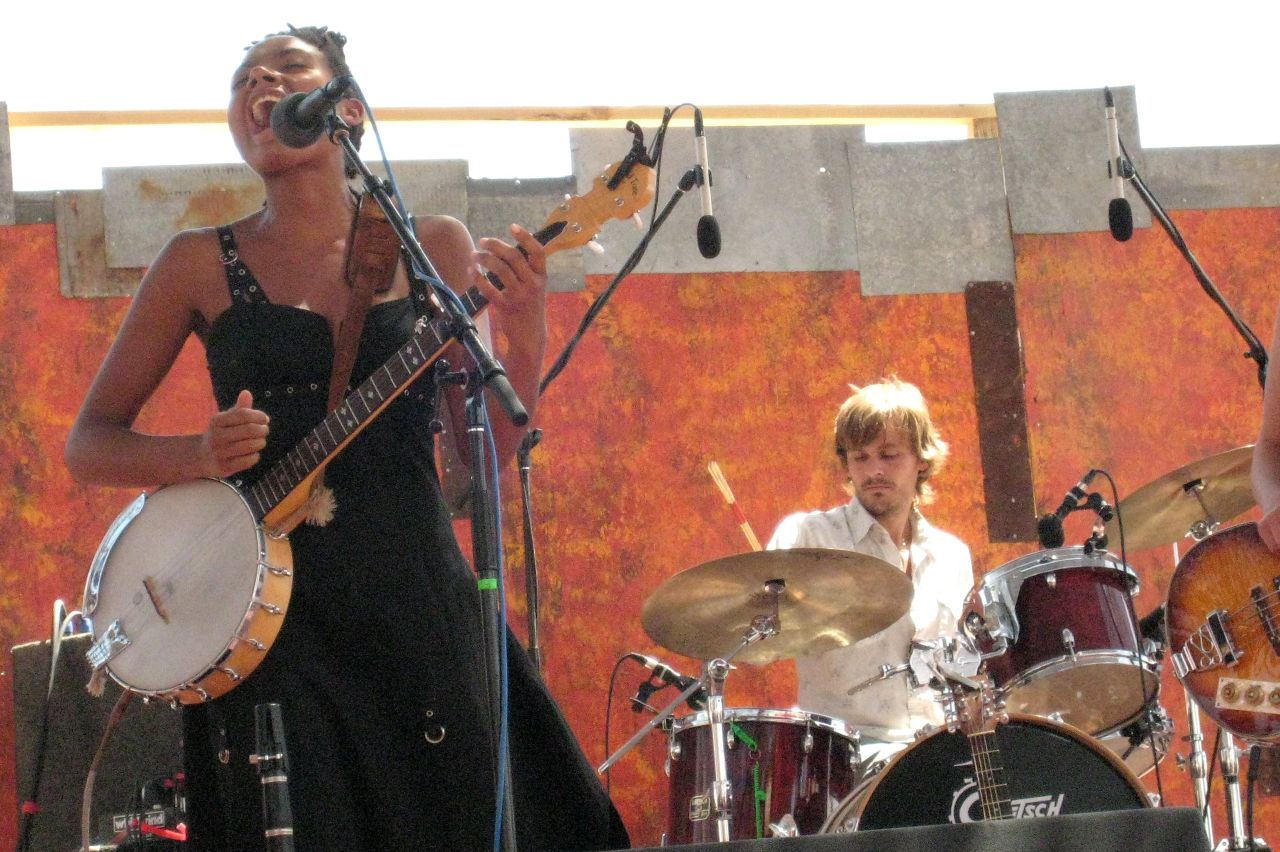
Russell performing with Po' Girl in 2009

In 2003, Russell formed the band Po' Girl with The Be Good Tanyas member Trish Klein. She recorded seven albums with the band: Po' Girl (2003), Vagabond Lullabies (2004), B-side Recordings (2006), Home to You (2007), Deer in the Night (2008), Live (2009), and Follow Your Bliss (2010). In 2011, Russell's work with the second iteration of Sankofa Strings—Sankofa—recording "The Uptown Strut" (with Grammy award-winning artist Dom Flemons, the Lovin' Spoonful's John Sebastian, Grammy-nominated Professor Louie (Aaron Hurwitz), Súle Greg Wilson, and Ndidi Onukwulu), was released on the Kingswood Records label. Russell penned "If Wishes Were Gold", the only original on the album.

The following year, Russell formed the music group Birds of Chicago with JT Nero. As part of Birds of Chicago, Russell released three studio albums: Birds of Chicago (2012), Real Midnight (2016), and Love in Wartime (2018). With the group, she also released a live album, Live from Space, and an EP titled American Flowers in 2018.

In 2018, Russell joined the musical collective Our Native Daughters alongside fellow musicians Rhiannon Giddens, Leyla McCalla, and Amythyst Kiah. In 2019, the group released the album Songs of Our Native Daughters under the Smithsonian Folkways label. Russell was also featured alongside the rest of the group in a Smithsonian Channel documentary titled Reclaiming History: Our Native Daughters. As a single, Russell released covers of the songs "By Your Side" by Sade and "Landslide" by Fleetwood Mac in January 2021. She also released a cover of "Everything I Wanted" by Billie Eilish as a single in February 2021.

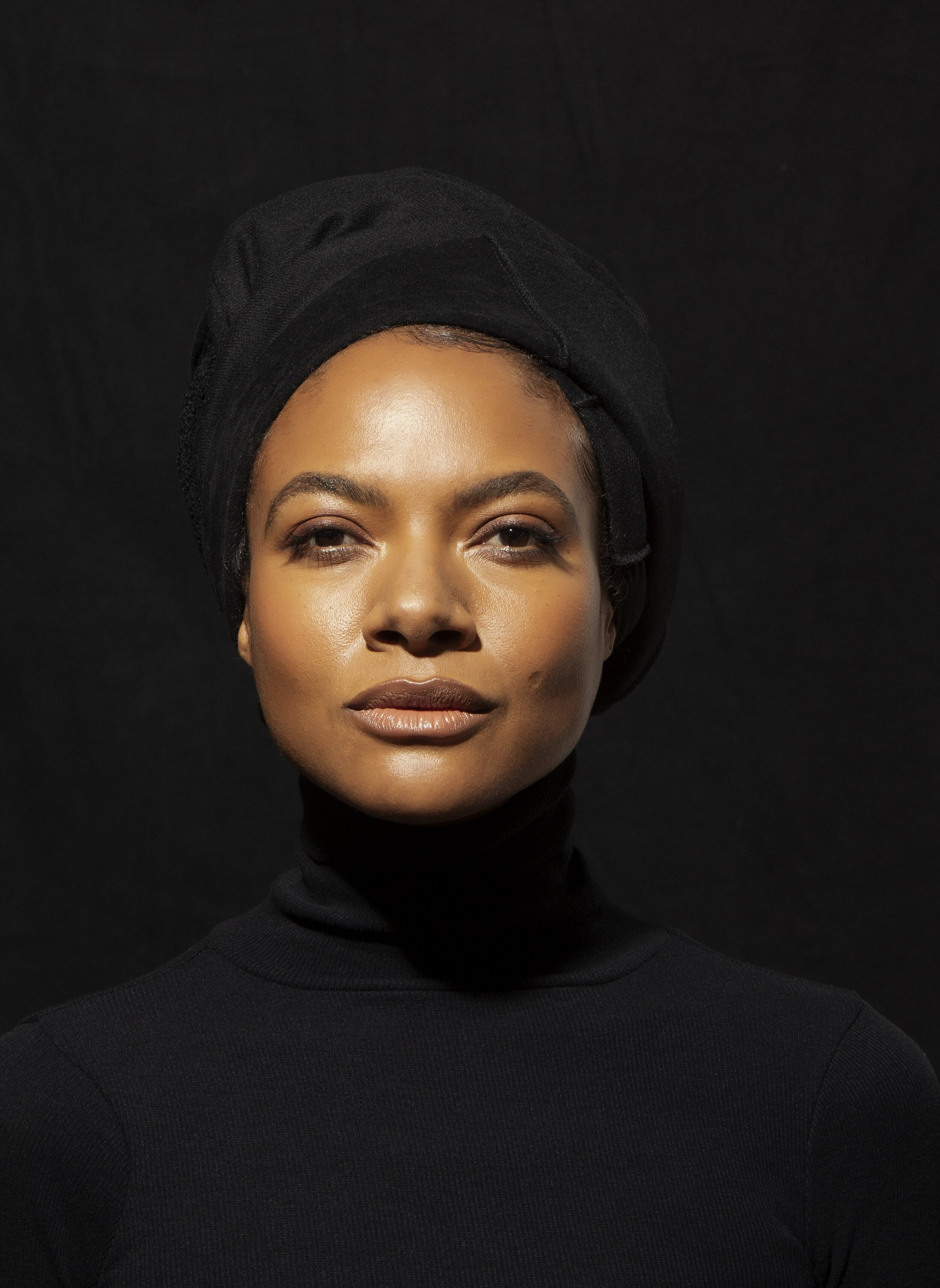
Russell in 2020

In March 2021, Russell released "Nightflyer" as the first single from her album Outside Child. She followed this up with the single "Persephone," released in April of the same year. She also released the singles "Montreal" and "The Runner" ahead of the album's full release.

On May 21, 2021, Russell released her first solo album Outside Child under Fantasy Records. The album explores her experiences during her youth, including her recovery from the trauma of her childhood abuse. For her work on the album, Russell was nominated for multiple awards, including four Canadian Folk Music Awards, the long list for the Polaris Music Prize, and a nomination for Emerging Act of the Year at the 2021 Americana Honors & Awards. She was nominated for this award both as a solo artist and in the duo/group category as a member of Our Native Daughters.

Russell performed her song "Nightflyer" with guests Brandi Carlile and Brittney Spencer on an episode of Jimmy Kimmel Live! aired on May 25, 2021. On May 28, 2021, Russell made her debut at the Grand Ole Opry. In the same year, she also performed at the Country Music Hall of Fame. She performed several songs from Outside Child live on CBS This Morning Saturday on July 24, 2021.

On September 25, 2021, Russell performed at the annual Farm Aid event in Hartford, Connecticut.

In November 2021, Russell received three Grammy nominations (Best American Roots Performance; Best American Roots Song; Best Americana Album). A month later, she was one of several artists to perform with the Black Opry, a revue focused on black artists in country music. On August 18, 2022, she and Brandi Carlile released a re-imagining of "You're Not Alone" which previously appeared on the Songs of Our Native Daughters album.

In March 2023, Russell organized Love Rising, an all-star benefit concert, at the Bridgestone Arena in Nashville in response to Tennessee's anti-LGBT+ legislation.

Russell's second solo album, The Returner, was released on September 8, 2023. In November 2023, Russell received four Grammy nominations for it (Best American Roots Performance; Best American Roots Song; Best Americana Album; Best Americana Performance). The album was a shortlisted finalist for the 2024 Polaris Music Prize.

In July 2024, Russell provided the voice of Teddi Barra in the Country Bear Musical Jamboree at Walt Disney World's Magic Kingdom.

In September 2024, it was announced that Russell would be making her Broadway debut, performing the role of Persephone in the musical Hadestown. Her performances begin on November 12, 2024.

On July 16, 2025, the 80th anniversary of the world's first nuclear weapon test, Trinity (nuclear test), Russell performed, with the Kronos Quartet, Bob Dylan's "A Hard Rain's a-Gonna Fall" at The University of Chicago. This event closed the Nobel Laureate Assembly for the Prevention of Nuclear War.

== Personal life ==
In 2013, Russell married her Birds of Chicago bandmate Jeremy Lindsay (stage name JT Nero). They were close friends and housemates. Russell gave birth to their daughter, Ida, in 2014.

Russell is queer and stated in an interview that "I fall in the middle of the spectrum of orientation. I've been in love with women and I've been in love with men and I've been in love with trans people and I've been in love with non-binary people. I wound up falling in love and committing to share a life with a man, my husband. One could assume that I'm straight, but I am not and especially in this time of increased polarization and bigotry, it is really important that people understand that nothing is black and white. Nothing is simple and you can't assume that because I am married to a man and I have a child that I am a straight person. You can't say homophobic things to me and have it pass. Part of me wanted to really acknowledge that publicly". She stated that "Persephone", a song from her debut album, was written about her first love, a woman she met during her teenage years.

In 2023, she told Out that she was a "hopeful agnostic", adding that she believed that "empathy is a superpower and that diversity is not a dirty word" and said she "resist[s] the divide-and-conquer tactics of all toxic hierarchies... Our differences are riches... Our rainbow coalition is unstoppable."

Russell signed the October 2023 Artists4Ceasefire open letter addressed to President Joe Biden during the war in Gaza following the October 7 attacks.

== Band ==
- Allison Russell - vocals, guitar, banjo, clarinet
- Elenna Canlas - musical director, keyboards, melodica, backing vocals
- Ganessa James - bass, acoustic guitar, backing vocals
- Yissy Garcia - drums, percussion, backing vocals
- Joy Clark - acoustic and electric guitars, backing vocals
- Caoimhe Hopkinson - acoustic and electric guitars, bass, backing vocals
- Caoi de Barra - drums, percussion, backing vocals

Previous band members:

- Larissa Maestro - cello, backing vocals
- SistaStrings (Monique and Chauntee Ross) - cello and violin, backing vocals
- Mandy Fer - electric guitar, backing vocals
- Megan Coleman/Elizabeth Goodfellow - drums

== Discography ==
=== Studio albums ===
==== Solo albums ====
List of albums, with selected chart positions
| Title | Album details | Peak chart position |
| Title | Album details | US Current |
|---|---|---|
| Outside Child | Released: May 21, 2021; Label: Fantasy; Format: Digital download, streaming, CD, vinyl | 65 |
| The Returner | Released: September 8, 2023; Label: Fantasy; Format: Digital download, streaming, CD, vinyl | 47 |
| In The Hour of Chaos | Released: July 10, 2026; Label: Fantasy; Format: Digital download, streaming, CD, vinyl | |

==== Tim Readman & Fear Of Drinking ====
| Title | Album details |
|---|---|
| In Black & White | Released: 1999; Label: Big City Productions; Format: CD |

==== Po' Girl ====
| Title | Album details |
|---|---|
| Po' Girl | Released: June 10, 2003; Label: Jericho Beach; Format: CD, digital download |
| Vagabond Lullabies | Released: September 21, 2004; Label: Nettwerk; Format: CD, digital download |
| Home to You | Released: February 13, 2007; Label: Nettwerk; Format: CD, digital download |
| Deer in the Night | Released: March 9, 2009; Label: Po' Girl Music; Format: CD, digital download |
| Po' Girl Live | Released: 2009; Label: Po' Girl Music; Format: CD, digital download |
| Follow Your Bliss | Released: July 20, 2010; Label: Po' Girl Music; Format: CD, digital download |

==== Sankofa ====
| Title | Album details |
|---|---|
| The Uptown Strut | Released: 2011; Label: Kingswood Records; Format: CD |

==== Birds of Chicago ====
| Title | Album details |
|---|---|
| Birds of Chicago | Released: October 1, 2012; Label: Chicago Bird Music; Format: CD, digital download |
| Live from Space | Released: December 5, 2013; Label: Chicago Bird Music; Format: CD, digital download |
| Real Midnight | Released: February 19, 2016; Label: Chicago Bird Music, BSMF; Format: CD, digital download |
| American Flowers | Released: November 17, 2017; Label: Chicago Bird Music, Signature Sounds; Format: CD, digital download |
| Love in Wartime | Released: May 4, 2018; Label: Chicago Bird Music, BSMF, Signature Sounds; Format: CD, LP, digital download, streaming |

==== Our Native Daughters ====
List of albums, with selected chart positions
| Title | Album details | Peak chart position |
| Title | Album details | TCA |
|---|---|---|
| Songs of Our Native Daughters | Released: February 22, 2019; Label: Smithsonian Folkways; Format: Digital download, streaming | 100 |

=== Singles ===
==== As lead artist ====
| Title | Year | Album | Ref. |
|---|---|---|---|
| "By Your Side / Landslide" | 2021 | Non-album singles | |
| "Everything I Wanted" | 2021 | Non-album singles | |
| "Nightflyer" | 2021 | Outside Child | |
| "Persephone" | 2021 | Outside Child | |
| "Montreal" | 2021 | Outside Child | |
| "The Runner" | 2021 | Outside Child | |
| "Have Yourself a Merry Little Christmas" / "Have Yourself a Merry Little Christmas" - French Version | 2021 | Non-album single | |
| "Persephone" - Luck Mansion Sessions | 2022 | Non-album single | |
| "All of the Women (Dim Star Remix)" (featuring Sa-Roc) | 2022 | Non-album single | |
| "You're Not Alone" (featuring Brandi Carlile) | 2022 | Non-album single | (Note: "You're Not Alone" originally appeared on Our Native Daughters debut album Songs of Our Native Daughters) |
| "4th Day Prayer (Dim Star Remix)" (featuring Mumu Fresh) | 2023 | | |
| "The Returner" | 2023 | The Returner | |
| "Stay Right Here" | 2023 | The Returner | |
| "Snakelife" | 2023 | The Returner | |
| "Demons" | 2023 | The Returner | |
| "Superlover" (featuring Annie Lennox) | 2025 | | |
| "Rainbows" | 2026 | In The Hour of Chaos | |
| "No Springtime" (featuring Joy Oladokun and Julie Williams) | 2026 | In The Hour of Chaos | |
| "Cold April" (featuring Kara Jackson, Denitia & Explore! Pop Choir) | 2026 | In The Hour of Chaos | |

==== As featured artist ====
| Title | Year | Album | Ref. |
|---|---|---|---|
| "Prodigal Daughter" (Aoife O'Donovan featuring Allison Russell) | 2021 | Age of Apathy | |
| "Wildflower and Barley" (Hozier featuring Allison Russell) | 2023 | Unreal Unearth: Unheard | |
| "Pathways" (Julian Tayor featuring Allison Russell) | 2024 | Pathways | |

==== Theme parks attractions ====
| Year | Title | Role | Note |
|---|---|---|---|
| 2024 | Country Bear Musical Jamboree | Teddi Barra | |

== Awards and nominations ==
Allison Russell awards and nominations
Awards and nominations
| Award | Wins | Nominations |
| Americana Music Honors & Awards | 2 | 9 |
| Canadian Folk Music Awards | 3 | 4 |
| Folk Alliance Awards | 2 | 2 |
| Grammy Awards | 1 | 8 |
| Juno Awards | 1 | 2 |
| Libera Awards | 0 | 3 |
| Polaris Music Prize | 0 | 1 |
| UK Americana Music Awards | 6 | 6 |

Totals (Note: Certain award groups do not simply award one winner. They acknowledge several different recipients, have runners-up, and have third place. Since this is a specific recognition and is different from losing an award, runner-up mentions are considered wins in this award tally. For simplification and to avoid errors, each award in this list has been presumed to have had a prior nomination.)
- Wins: 12
- Nominations: 35

| Year | Nominated work | Event | Award | Result | Ref. |
|---|---|---|---|---|---|
| 2021 | Outside Child | Polaris Music Prize | | Nominated | |
| 2021 | Herself | Americana Music Honors & Awards | Emerging Artist of the Year | Nominated | |
| 2021 | Our Native Daughters | Americana Music Honors & Awards | Duo/Group of the Year | Nominated | |
| 2022 | Outside Child | Grammy Awards | Best Americana Album | Nominated | |
| 2022 | "Nightflyer" | Grammy Awards | Best American Roots Song | Nominated | |
| 2022 | "Nightflyer" | Grammy Awards | Best American Roots Performance | Nominated | |
| 2022 | Herself | UK Americana Music Awards | International Artist of the Year | Won | |
| 2022 | Outside Child | UK Americana Music Awards | International Album of the Year | Won | |
| 2022 | Outside Child | Canadian Folk Music Awards | Contemporary Album of the Year | Won | |
| 2022 | Herself | Canadian Folk Music Awards | English Songwriter of the Year | Won | |
| 2022 | Herself | Canadian Folk Music Awards | New/Emerging Artist of the Year | Won | |
| 2022 | Herself | Canadian Folk Music Awards | Pushing the Boundaries Award | Nominated | |
| 2022 | Herself | Juno Awards | Songwriter of the Year | Nominated | |
| 2022 | Outside Child | Juno Awards | Contemporary Roots Album of the Year | Won | |
| 2022 | Outside Child | Folk Alliance Awards | Album of the Year | Won | |
| 2022 | Herself | Folk Alliance Awards | Artist of the Year | Won | |
| 2022 | Herself | Americana Music Honors & Awards | Artist of the Year | Nominated | |
| 2022 | "Persephone" | Americana Music Honors & Awards | Song of the Year | Nominated | |
| 2022 | Outside Child | Americana Music Honors & Awards | Album of the Year | Won | |
| 2023 | "You're Not Alone" (featuring Brandi Carlile) | UK Americana Music Awards | International Song of the Year | Won | |
| 2023 | Herself | UK Americana Music Awards | International Artist of the Year | Won | |
| 2023 | "Prodigal Daughter" (with Aoife O'Donovan) | Grammy Awards | Best American Roots Performance | Nominated | |
| 2023 | Herself | Libera Awards | A2IM Humanitarian Award | Nominated | |
| 2023 | Herself | Libera Awards | Breakthrough Artist/Release | Nominated | |
| 2023 | "You're Not Alone" (featuring Brandi Carlile) | Libera Awards | Best Singer-Songwriter Record | Nominated | |
| 2023 | "You're Not Alone" (featuring Brandi Carlile) | Americana Music Honors & Awards | Song of the Year | Nominated | |
| 2023 | Herself | Americana Music Honors & Awards | Artist of the Year | Nominated | |
| 2023 | Herself | Americana Music Honors & Awards | Spirit of Americana/Free Speech Award | Won | |
| 2024 | The Returner | UK Americana Music Awards | International Album of the Year | Won | |
| 2024 | Herself | UK Americana Music Awards | International Artist of the Year | Won | |
| 2024 | The Returner | Grammy Awards | Best Americana Album | Nominated | |
| 2024 | "The Returner" | Grammy Awards | Best American Roots Song | Nominated | |
| 2024 | "The Returner" | Grammy Awards | Best Americana Performance | Nominated | |
| 2024 | "Eve Was Black" | Grammy Awards | Best American Roots Performance | Won | |
