= Po' Girl =

Canadian folk music group

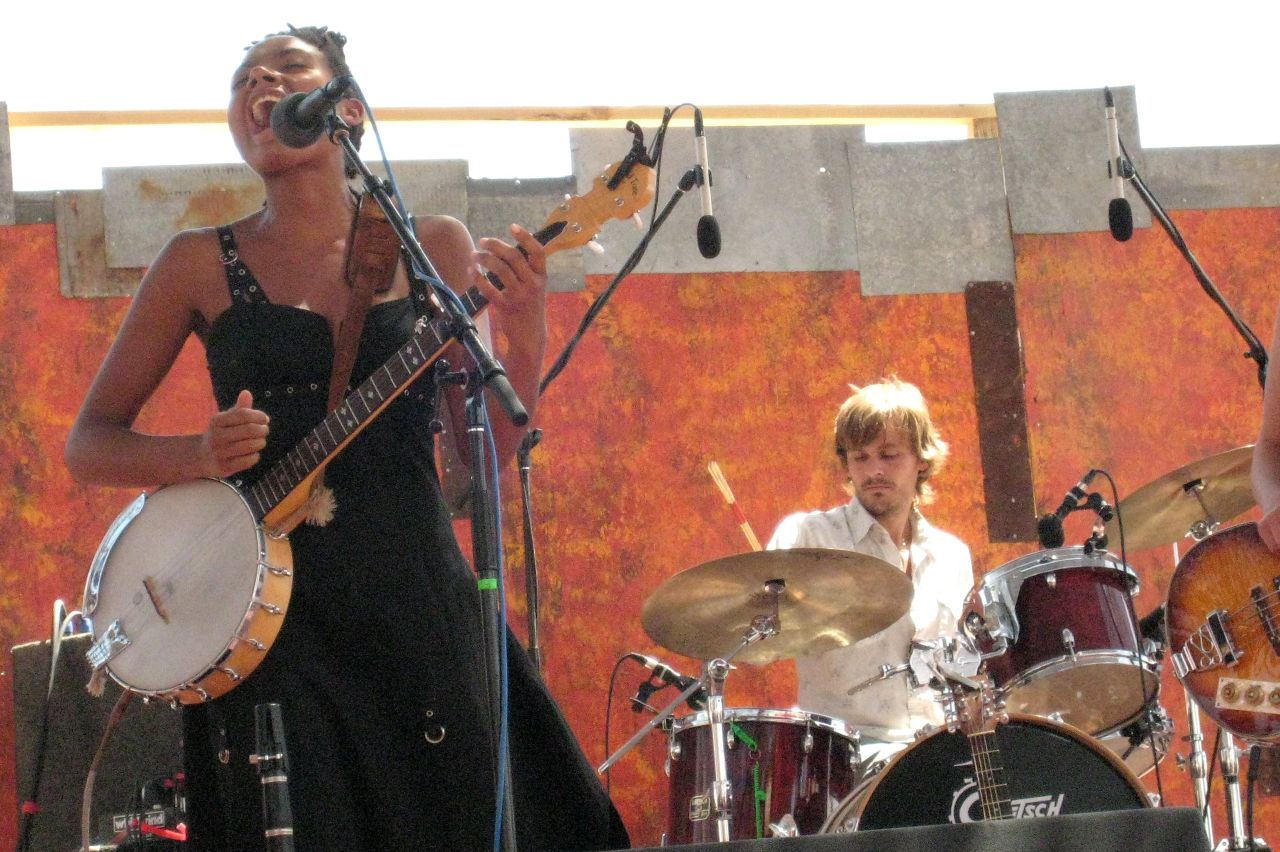
- Po' Girl, performing at the Joshua Tree Music Festival

Background information
- Origin: Vancouver, British Columbia, Canada
- Genres: Folk; country; Americana
- Years active: 2000–present
- Labels: Nettwerk; Jericho Beach
- Members: Allison Russell; Awna Teixeira; Benny Sidelinger; Mikey "Lightning" August
- Past members: Trish Klein; JJ Jones; Diona Davies; Shelley Okepnak; John Raham

Po' Girl is a Canadian music group whose style derives from folk, country, and jazz. The band evolved from a series of jam sessions, in 2000, between Trish Klein of The Be Good Tanyas and Allison Russell, then of Fear of Drinking. The two met up again in 2003 and named themselves Po' Girl. Klein said at the time that the new group offered her the opportunity to write and perform her own songs. Po' Girl recorded their last album in 2010, but the members' musical careers have continued to develop, either as soloists or in other bands. Once based in Vancouver, Po' Girl is now back in the Eastern cities of Toronto and Montreal. The current band lineup is Allison Russell (singer/multi-instrumentalist), Awna Teixeira (singer/multi-instrumentalist), Benny Sidelinger (multi-instrumentalist), and Mikey "Lightning" August.

== Musical style ==
The style of music they perform has been called "urban roots", defined by band founding member Allison Russell as "rural music with urban lyrical content and appeal, typically played on old-timey instruments...defined in its early years...[as]...mostly folk- and country-influenced". The band's sound has been described as having a "bit more jazz and swing" than that of the Be Good Tanyas, and "with straightforward musicianship built around Klein and Russell’s intertwining vocals, Po' Girl delivers nice, casual music that slowly grooves into the heart." Po' Girl's music has been compared with that of The Band, Hazel Dickens, Tracy Chapman, Natalie Merchant, Elizabeth Cotten, and Norah Jones. It showcases melodies from instruments as diverse as banjo, clarinet, harmonica, dobro, accordion, and gutbucket bass.

== Recordings ==
They released their self-titled debut album in 2003. One reviewer commented on the "folk-mountain fresh" vocals of Klein, the "sleepy clarinet" of Russell and similarities to The Cowboy Junkies and Norah Jones. Shortly after the release of the first album, the band added a new member, Diona Davies, who was known to Klein as a skilled fiddler.

In 2004, they recorded and released their second album, Vagabond Lullabies, which included Davies (fiddle, piano and vocals), CR Avery, (hip hopper) from the trio Tons of Fun University, Roey Shemesh on bass and John Raham and Shelley Okepnak on drums. The album was positively received, with Sue Keogh of the British Broadcasting Corporation (BBC) noting that "This is a sweet little gem showcasing some of the finest acoustic musicians Canada currently has to offer," and Mike Regenstreif in Sing Out! writing that "Hip hop poet C.R. Avery effectively adds spoken word passages to a couple of songs". There were guest appearances on Vagabond Lullabies from Frazey Ford and Ani DiFranco. One reviewer stated that Vagabond Lullabies had more "depth and maturity" than their debut album, with contrasting vocals and good harmonies, but did comment that there was "still an odd Americana-goes-pop polish that keeps Po' Girl from sounding entirely authentic".

2006 saw the release of their B Side record, with tracks including guest appearances by Sarah Harmer, Luther Wright, Shaun Brodie, Jason Mercer, and Ana Egge (which could only be purchased off-stage). In 2007 came their third album, Home to You, which was noted as being focused "on the band's bittersweet relationship with being away from home". One reviewer said the album was a "most nourishing slice of Americana" with a mixture of folk, blues and alt-rock.

Deer in the Night was released in May 2009 with one reviewer noting that there were "touches of jazz idiosyncrasy in their vocal lines, echoes of French chanson, hints of the deliciously odd Nova Scotian folk, all mix[ed] together into an organic whole". Russell was later to note that she had been abused by her stepfather for 10 years when she was a teenager and wrote the song "No Shame" in 2006 following his release from prison. She said she was encouraged to perform the song on stage by the other band members and the response from members the audiences—many of whom told stories of their abuse—confirmed for her that the issue was "endemic". She said that it was important to not be silent about what had happened to her.

In the summer of 2009, they completed a live album consisting of recordings in venues from their favourite states. The studio album Follow Your Bliss, described as a "listening experience guided by a multitude of masterfully executed instruments which sound simple in their design but intricate in their delivery", was released in 2010. Joe Breen in The Irish Times commented that the music on the album showed many influences and could "never be accused of sameness".

== Live performances ==
In 2005, Davies estimated that the band had been touring for at least 10 months of the previous year, and admitted that much of their material was inspired from being on the road.

The band made their first tour to Scotland in 2010, playing at the Edinburgh Festival, and followed this up with a series of concerts around UK and Ireland. Folk Radio noted at the time:

It's impossible to put this band in a tidy little box – they're equally at home in Douala, Cameroon playing the Massao World Music Festival, as they are at the International Jazz Festival in Montreal, the Winnipeg Folk Festival, the Woodford Music Festival in Australia or just playing for fun for the people in Vondel Park, Amsterdam.

They played Ontario in 2012 which they found "inspiring", and when interviewed before a concert in 2011, Russell said that the group was a "modern-day troupe of nomads" who had toured extensively and she was "willing to make sacrifices to see where the road would take Po' Girl".

== Ongoing musical careers of members ==
Russell has continued her musical career, being a member and co-director of the band Birds of Chicago since 2012, and from 2019 has performed with and written for the band Our Native Daughters, whose debut album, Songs of Our Native Daughters, was widely acclaimed. In 2021, Russell released her debut solo album Outside Child.

From 2006, Davies has been a member of the band E.S.L.

Trish Klein has continued to work with The Be Good Tanyas, as well as having credits for recording with Frazey Ford, Ana Egge, and Bill Bourne, and on several roots revival compilation albums.

In 2012, Awna Teixeira released a solo album, Where the Darkness Goes. She was joined by Allison Russell on this recording and the music was said to show inspiration from a wide range of sources that created songs in a folk style which were observations of her "life and times and travels". In 2013, in a home recording space in Salt Lake City, Teixeira played, sang and recorded all five songs on an EP Thunderbird. A full-length album, Wild One, was released by Teixeira in 2015, with a reviewer Greg Johnson noting that this second album "[was] a work of swirling mystery steeped in sweet misery with uplifting haunting music and an eclectic palette of songs and instruments". Teixeira commented:

"When I first started writing these songs almost two years ago, I decided that I would like to somehow use this release to help raise mental health awareness. There are songs on this album that make reference to and are for some beautiful people in my life that struggle with mental illness and for some beautiful people we have lost along the way".

Because of references in one song to mental illness issues within Teixeira' family, another reviewer said the album wasn't an "easy listen."

== Photo gallery ==
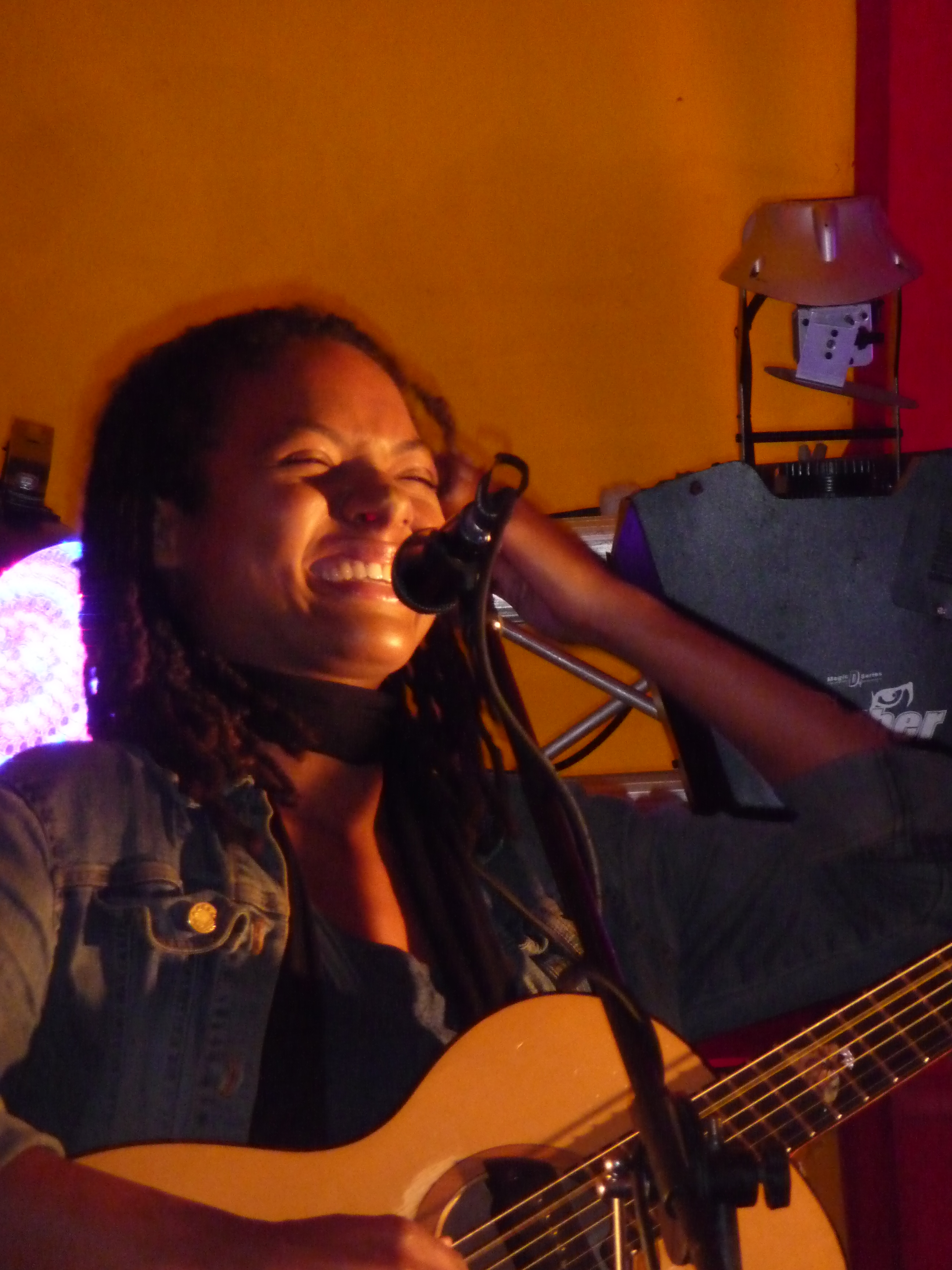
Allison Russell of Po' Girl, performing at Wood, 2009

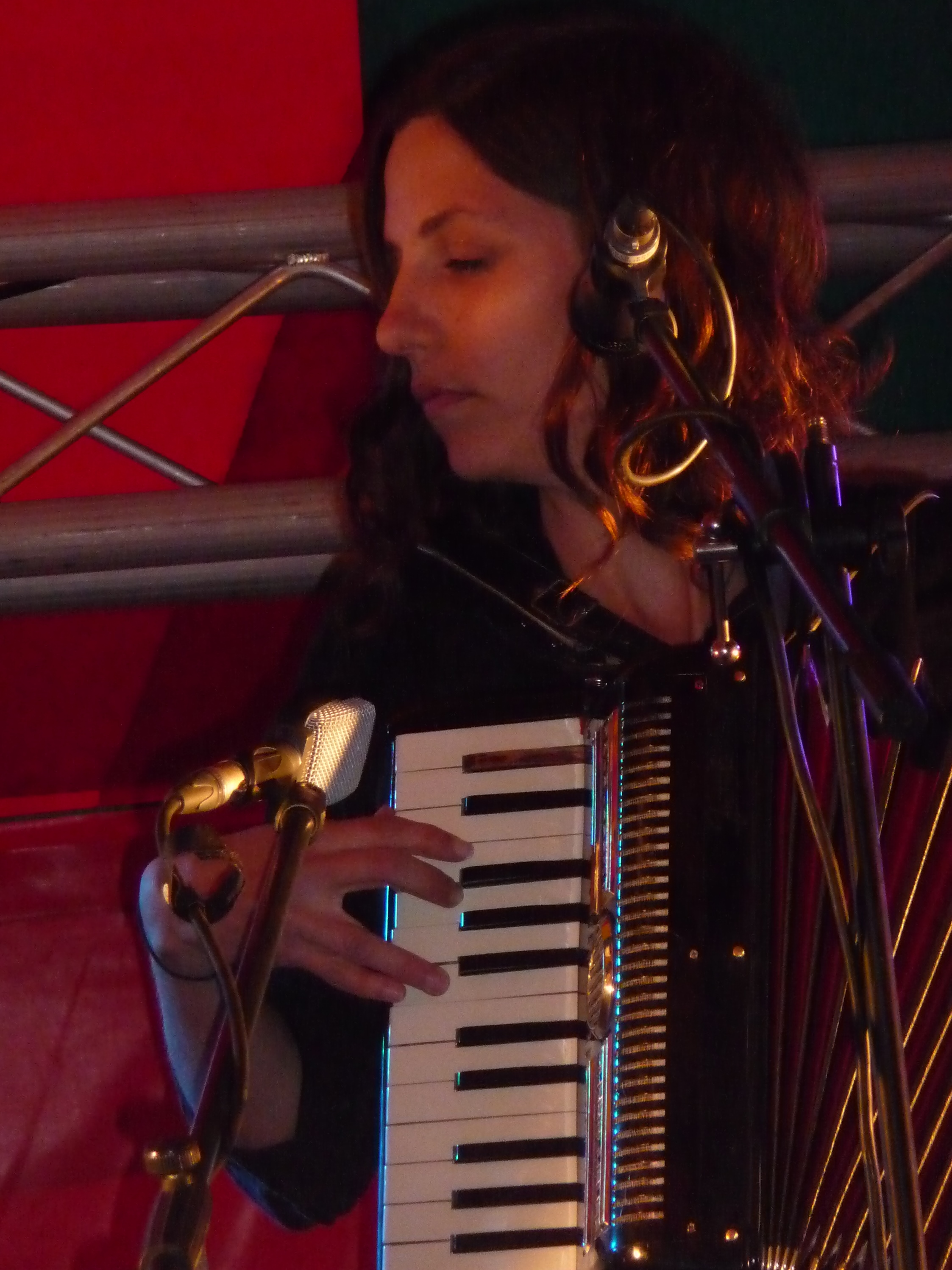
Awna Teixeira of Po' Girl, performing at Wood, 2009

== Discography ==
- 2003 Po' Girl
- 2004 Vagabond Lullabies
- 2006 B-side recordings
- 2007 Home to You
- 2008 Deer in the Night
- 2009 Live
- 2010 Follow Your Bliss
