= Black Opry =

American music website

- Website type: Blog, music news
- Available in: English
- Founded: April 18, 2021; 5 years ago
- Founder: Holly G.
- Website: blackopry.com

Black Opry was an American music website and touring revue. It was founded in April 2021 by Holly G. as a means of raising awareness for Black musicians in country music.

== History ==
The Black Opry was started in April 2021 by Holly G., a writer and flight attendant from Virginia. She was inspired to create a website dedicated to Black country music singers, in response to a study done by a musicologist which found that fewer than one percent of artists played on country radio in the preceding 20 years were artists of color. She began contacting various Black country artists through social media platforms in order to help raise awareness of their music. Holly G. has stated that she was inspired by Color Me Country, a podcast hosted by Black country singer Rissi Palmer which also discusses country music artists of color. Holly G. also cited as inspiration an incident in February 2021, when a recording of country singer Morgan Wallen using the racial slur nigger was publicized, leading to criticism and increased discussion of racial roles within country music.

The intent of the Black Opry is to allow Black country music artists to tour and perform. The Black Opry lists Black artists in the genre through its website, and through national tours under the name Black Opry Revue. In mid-2021, Holly G. and the Black Opry hosted a five-day concert focused on Black country artists, which included acts such as Rissi Palmer and Miko Marks. This was followed in September 2021 by the first performance under the Black Opry Revue name at New York City's Rockwood Music Hall. Tylar Bryant, Lizzie No, Roberta Lea, Joy Clark, and Jett Holden performed at this event. The Black Opry Revue also performed at Exit/In in Nashville, Tennessee, in December 2021 with Canadian singer Allison Russell. In February 2022, the Revue performed in Chicago and Washington, D.C. The Black Opry held a first-anniversary party at City Winery in Nashville on April 18, 2022. This party was sponsored by the television network CMT.

In mid-2024, Holly G. founded Black Opry Records in association with Thirty Tigers. The label's first signee is Jett Holden.
