= In the Hour of Chaos (album) =

Studio album by Allison Russell
- Released: July 10, 2026
- Genre: Americana
- Length: 41:58
- Label: Black Wonder
- Producers: Allison Russell; Dim Star

Allison Russell chronology
The Returner (2023)	In the Hour of Chaos (2026)

In the Hour of Chaos is the third studio album by the Canadian musician Allison Russell. It was released by Black Wonder LLC, an imprint of Fantasy Records, on July 10, 2026. Conceived as a "collaborative song suite," all but one of the eleven songs on the album has a guest artist.

== Composition ==
In the Hour of Chaos is made up of 11 songs, with Russell joined by other singers on all but the first song.

== Critical reception ==
Professional ratings
Review scores
Source	Rating
Hot Press	8/10
Spectrum Culture	7.5/10

The album received positive reviews from music critics, many of whom praised the collaborative nature of the album and the execution of the songs.

== Track listing ==
All tracks are written by Allison Russell, JT Nero, and Drew Lindsay, except "Good Omens" (written by Russell, Nero, Lindsay, Megan McCormick, and Ahya Simone).

No.	Title	Length
1.	"Rainbows"	3:41
2.	"No Springtime" (featuring Joy Oladokun and Julie Williams)	3:20
3.	"Cold April" (featuring Kara Jackson, Denitia, and Explore! Pop Choir)	3:09
4.	"Black Lavender" (featuring Brittney Spencer)	3:01
5.	"Really Real" (featuring Norah Jones)	3:25
6.	"Just Like Saturday" (featuring Ruby Amanfu)	2:54
7.	"Chaos Theory" (featuring Kyshona and Sara Watkins)	5:09
8.	"Love Is a Golden Lion" (featuring Devon Gilfillian)	2:57
9.	"Searchlight" (featuring Kashus Culpepper)	4:10
10.	"Two Stars" (featuring Chibueze Ihuoma)	4:39
11.	"Good Omens" (featuring Ahya Simone)	5:45
Total length:		41:58

== Personnel ==
Credits are adapted from Tidal.

- Allison Russell – vocals, production (all tracks); background vocals (tracks 2–11), banjo (10)
- Drew Lindsay (Note: Credited individually and as part of Dim Star) – production (all tracks), drum programming (1–5, 7, 9–11), synthesizer (2, 3, 5), organ (3, 5, 6), handclaps (3), keyboards (6, 10), piano (7, 11)
- JT Nero – production (all tracks), background vocals (1), handclaps (3), additional engineering (10)
- Brandon Bell – engineering, mixing (all tracks); sound effects (8)
- Annie Petrik – engineering assistance
- Caroline Whitaker – engineering assistance
- Kelsey Porter – engineering assistance
- Skyler Chuckry – engineering assistance
- Kim Rosen – mastering
- Megan McCormick – electric guitar (all tracks), bass guitar (2, 3, 6, 7, 9), acoustic guitar (2, 5), sound effects (8)
- Elizabeth Pupo-Walker – percussion
- Wendy Melvoin – acoustic guitar (1, 7, 11), bass guitar (4, 5, 9), ukulele (7, 11), electric guitar (8, 9), sound effects (8), drums (9)
- Kyshona – background vocals (1, 4, 6–8), vocals (7)
- Sara Watkins – background vocals (1, 4, 6–8), vocals (7)
- Ganessa James – background vocals, bass guitar (1)
- Caoi de Barra – background vocals, percussion (1)
- Caoimhe Hopkinson – vocals (1)
- Lisa Coleman – synthesizer (2, 7, 11), piano (4, 5, 9), sound effects (8)
- Joy Oladokun – vocals, background vocals (2)
- Julie Williams – background vocals (2)
- Denitia – background vocals (3, 8), vocals (3)
- Kara Jackson – vocals, background vocals (3)
- Marisa Frank – choir arrangement (3)
- Explore! Pop Choir (Note: The Explore! Pop Choir consists of singers Anarion Ewing, Asia Wilson, Aubree Johnson, Audrey Bennett, Bibiana Schrank, Brooke Jenkins, Brooklyn James, Brooklyn Murray, Chy'nia Ray, Daisy Hobbs, Eleanor Hill, Everly Miller, Gracie Gray, Griffin Cameron, Ida Robertson Lindsay, Jadalyn Stewart, Jourdyn Robinson, Kaytiya Swanson, Kingston Wilson, Legaci Shelton, Liya Thompson, Madisyn Walker, Marie Gates, Myers Gibson, Paris Bonds, TC Carruthers, Trinity Bentley, Vivienne Eck, and Zadia Johnston) – choir vocals (3)
- Nikki Glaspie – drums (4, 6, 11)
- Brittney Spencer – vocals, background vocals (4)
- Norah Jones – vocals, background vocals (5)
- Ruby Amanfu – vocals, background vocals (6)
- David Boyle – additional engineering (6)
- Devon Gilfillian – vocals, background vocals (8)
- Autumn Nicholas – background vocals (8)
- Ross Collier – additional engineering (9)
- Kashus Culpepper – vocals, background vocals (9)
- Chibueze Ihuoma – vocals, background vocals (10)
- Anna Butterss – bass guitar (11)
- Ahya Simone – harp (11)
