= Amythyst Kiah =

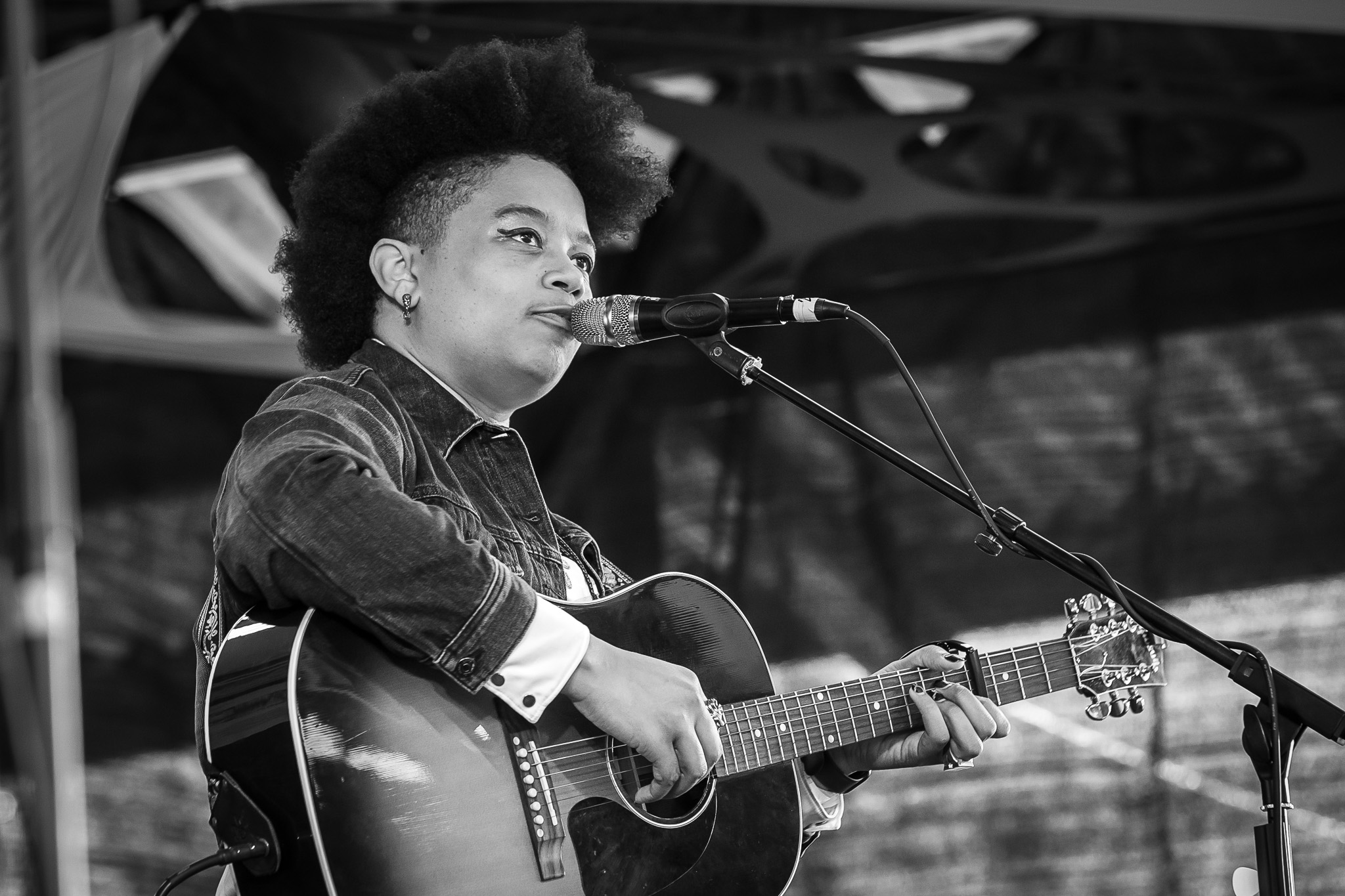
- Kiah performing at the Purbeck Valley Folk Festival in 2022

Background information
- Born: December 11, 1986 (age 39); Chattanooga, Tennessee, U.S.
- Genres: Folk; old-time music; alternative rock; rock; blues; alternative country; roots rock; Americana
- Instruments: Vocals; guitar; banjo
- Years active: 2010–present
- Label: Rounder Records
- Website: www.amythystkiah.com

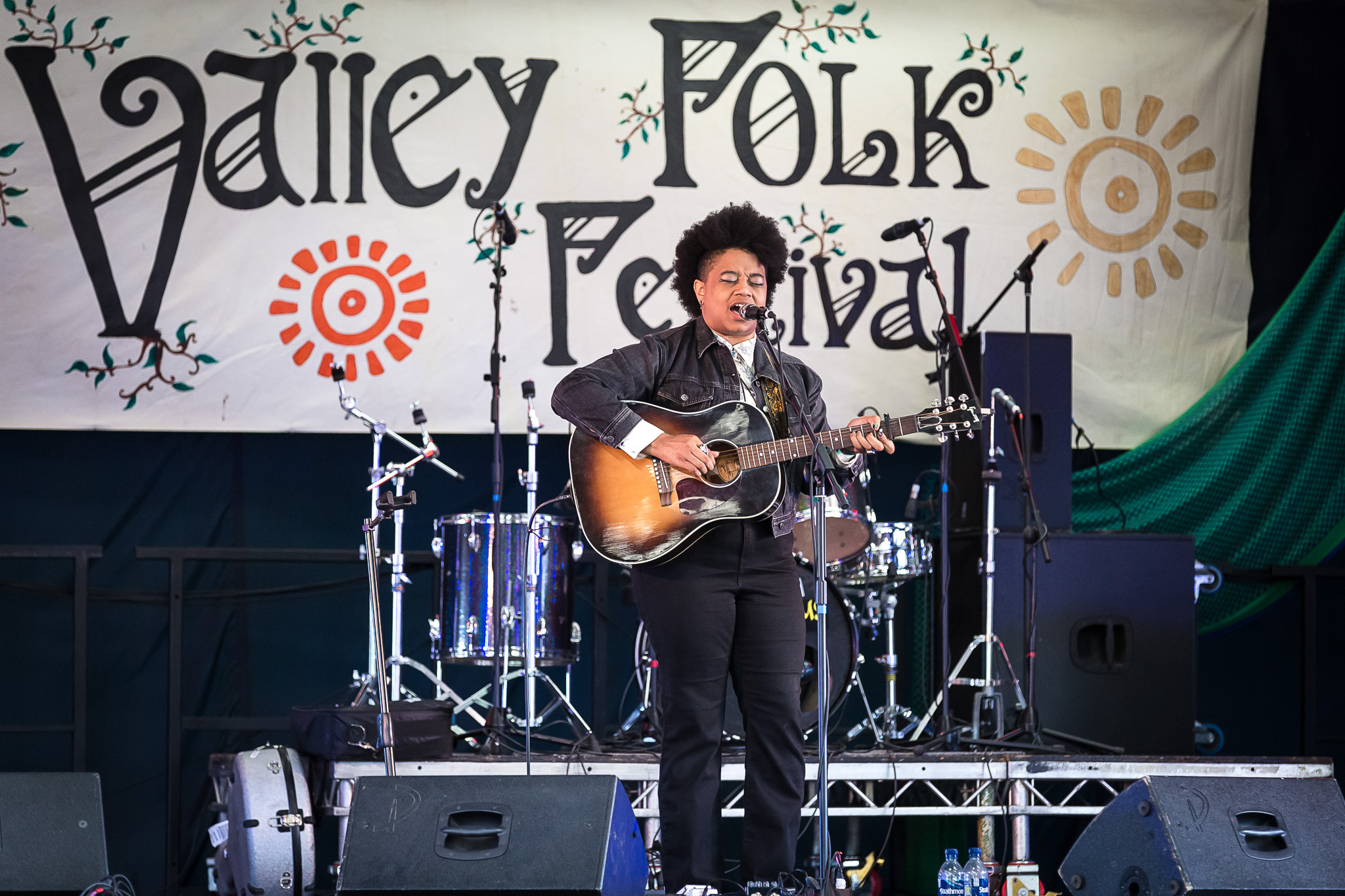
Amythyst Kiah at the Purbeck Valley Folk Festival on the Big Barn stage.

Amythyst Kiah (born 11 December 1986) is an American singer-songwriter. Kiah is a native of Chattanooga, Tennessee and currently lives in Johnson City. She plays guitar and banjo.

As of 2026, Kiah has released three solo albums and one EP. She has also appeared (along with Rhiannon Giddens, Leyla McCalla, and Allison Russell) on the album Songs of Our Native Daughters (2019). Kiah earned a 2020 Grammy Award Best American Roots Song nomination for her song "Black Myself".

== Life and career ==
=== 1986–2013: Early life ===
Kiah was born an only child in Chattanooga, Tennessee, United States. Her father (who is also her tour manager) sang and played percussion in a band in the 1970s as well as working as a manufacturing plant supervisor. Her mother sang in the church growing up and worked as a drug store manager. Her Parents collected all different genres of music from Jimi Hendrix to Dolly Parton to Yanni. When she was 17, her mother died by suicide, and singing at her funeral was Kiah's third public performance. After her mother's passing, she moved into her grandmother's house in Johnson City, Tennessee.

When she was just 13 Kiah got her first guitar, an 80s Fender, and taught herself to play by watching CD-ROM video lessons. As she learned more her interest in rock music grew. Junior year Kiah transferred to a creative arts high school where she majored in creative writing and took a classical guitar class as an elective. This was the only time in her career she studied classically, but it opened her up to later down the road learn her well known country style pickin' techniques.

Kiah is a graduate of East Tennessee State University, where she completed the Bluegrass, Old Time, and Country Music Studies program and joined the school's marquee old-time band.

She has been touring since 2010 either solo, with a band she called 'Her Chest of Glass' or with her fellow 'Our Native Daughters'.

=== 2013 onwards: Recording artist ===
Kiah describes her style as "Southern Gothic".

Kiah released her first album, Dig in 2013. The 10-track album was produced by Kiah and recorded at East Tennessee State University Recording Lab.

This was followed by an EP, Her Chest of Glass released on October 28, 2016. Kiah wrote three of the EP's five songs, which were recorded in Johnson City and produced by Kiah, band members and Travis Kammeyer.

Wary + Strange was released on Rounder Records on 18 June 2021, produced by Tony Berg. Kiah began work on the album in January 2018, and recorded the album three times, with three different producers before feeling happy with the sound. She intended the album to feel 'haunted' and 'slightly uncomfortable'. The album received favorable reviews with Glide magazine stating, "This album will be a centerpiece of conversation, not just this year, but in the years to come too" and Rolling Stone including it in their list of "25 Best Country and Americana Albums of 2021". Her song "Wild Turkey" was named by Variety as one of the 50 Best Songs of 2021.

"Wild Turkey" is an unsettling song about the suicide of her mother in the Tennessee River. Kiah wrote the song over the course of two years as she tested different chords and melodies making it perfect.Throughout the song Kiah grapples with the tragic reality singing, "she is never coming back". She walks through her stages of grieving, touching on denial, feeling numb, and a sense of emptiness. Her sound in this track combined her folk and Americana roots with a full sonic production featuring keyboard and strings that build throughout the piece.

In 2021, she was a featured vocalist on Moby's single "Natural Blues" (reprise Version).

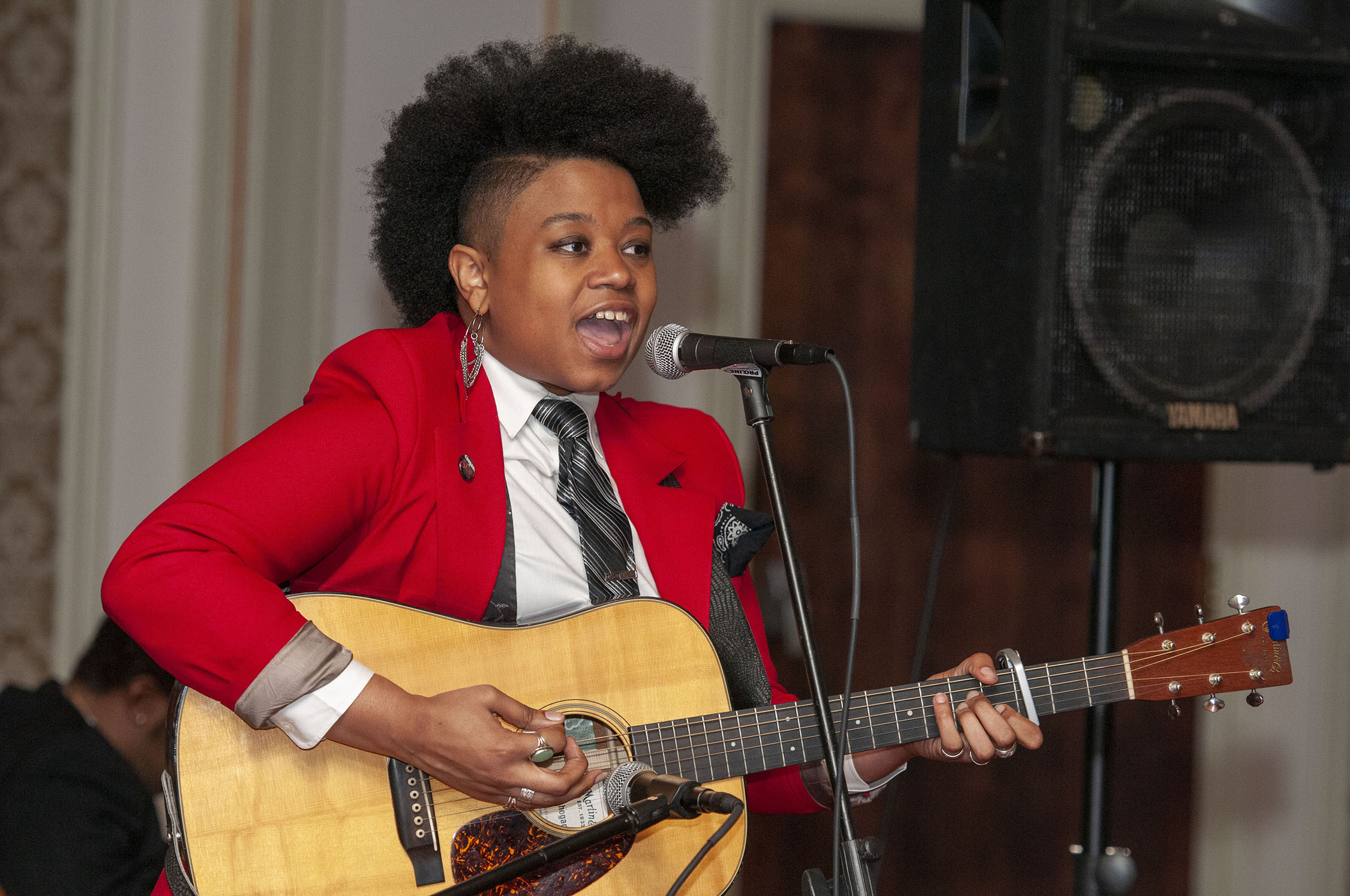
Amythyst Kiah gives a performance in 2015.

On 14 January 2022, she released a cover of Joy Division's "Love Will Tear Us Apart".

Kiah has toured extensively, including throughout the US, Mexico and to the UK. In 2021 she went on tour with Brandi Carlile and performed as her opening act in multiple cities.

Still + Bright was produced and recorded the in Nashville studio of Butch Walker. Released on 25 October 24, the 12-track project marked a shift for Kiah, from solo songwriting to working with cowriters. The album focuses on embracing struggle and the joy of self-discovery while exploring new and emotional terrains. She co-wrote with Tim Armstrong, Sadler Vaden, and Sean McConnell making it her first time working with co-writers on an album. The album also features songs with artists, S.G. Goodman, Billy Strings, and Avi Kaplan.

=== Participation in Songs of Our Native Daughters ===
Kiah has also appeared (along with Rhiannon Giddens, Leyla McCalla, and Allison Russell) on the album Songs of Our Native Daughters (2019). Kiah earned a 2020 Grammy Award Best American Roots Song nomination for her song "Black Myself" which featured on this album.

This project was initiated by Giddens and recorded in Louisiana. The artists wrote the songs collectively and were inspired by early American history. The goal of the music was to highlight contributions from Black artists in the early development of country music. One example of this is the use of instruments with African origins, such as the banjo.

=== Personal life ===
Kiah has described herself as "funny-talking, sci-fi-loving, queer Black". She has stated that making music has helped her cope with anxiety around her identity, and that she sees it as a means of increasing the visibility of Black creators. She currently lives in Johnson City, Tennessee. The Martin D Mahogany 09 has consistently been one of her favorite guitars.

== Discography ==
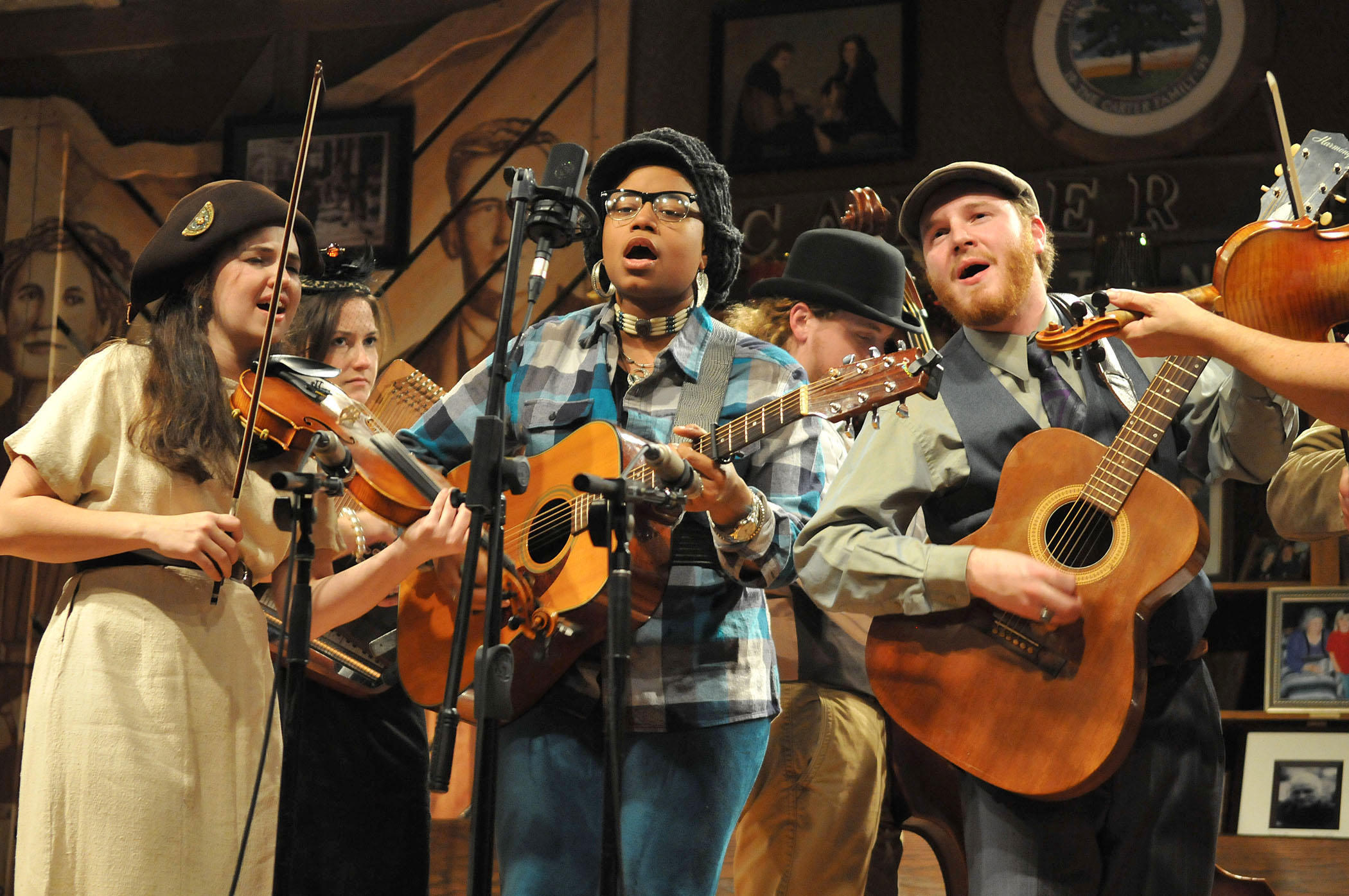
Amythyst Kiah and fellow ETSU students play at the Carter Family Fold in December 2010.

=== Albums ===
- Dig (2013)
- Her Chest Of Glass (2017)
- Wary + Strange (2021)
- Still + Bright (2024)

=== EPs ===
- Pensive Pop (2022)

=== Singles ===
- "Your Ghost" (2020) with Dave Hause and Kam Franklin
- "Natural Blues" (2021) by Moby with Amythyst Kiah
- "Black Myself" (2021) Moby Remix
- "Fancy Drones" (Fracture Me) [Live at Studio 615 / May 2021] (2021)
- "Love Will Tear Us Apart" (2022)
- "Wild Turkey" (Live) (2022)
- "Flower (Find My Baby) - Resound NYC Version" (2023) by Moby with Amythyst Kiah
- "In the Pines" (2024)
- "Play God and Destroy the World" featuring S.G. Goodman (2024)
- "I Will Not Go Down" featuring Billy Strings (2024)

== Awards and nominations ==
Year	Association	Category	Nominated work	Work
2019	Americana Music Honors & Awards	Duo/Group of the Year	Our Native Daughters	Nominated
2020	Grammy Awards	Best American Roots Song	Black Myself	Nominated
2021	Americana Music Honors & Awards	Duo/Group of the Year	Our Native Daughters	Nominated
2021	Americana Music Honors & Awards	Emerging Act of the Year	Amythyst Kiah	Nominated
2021	Americana Music Honors & Awards	Song of the Year	Black Myself	Nominated
