= Grammy Award for Best Americana Performance =

Award category

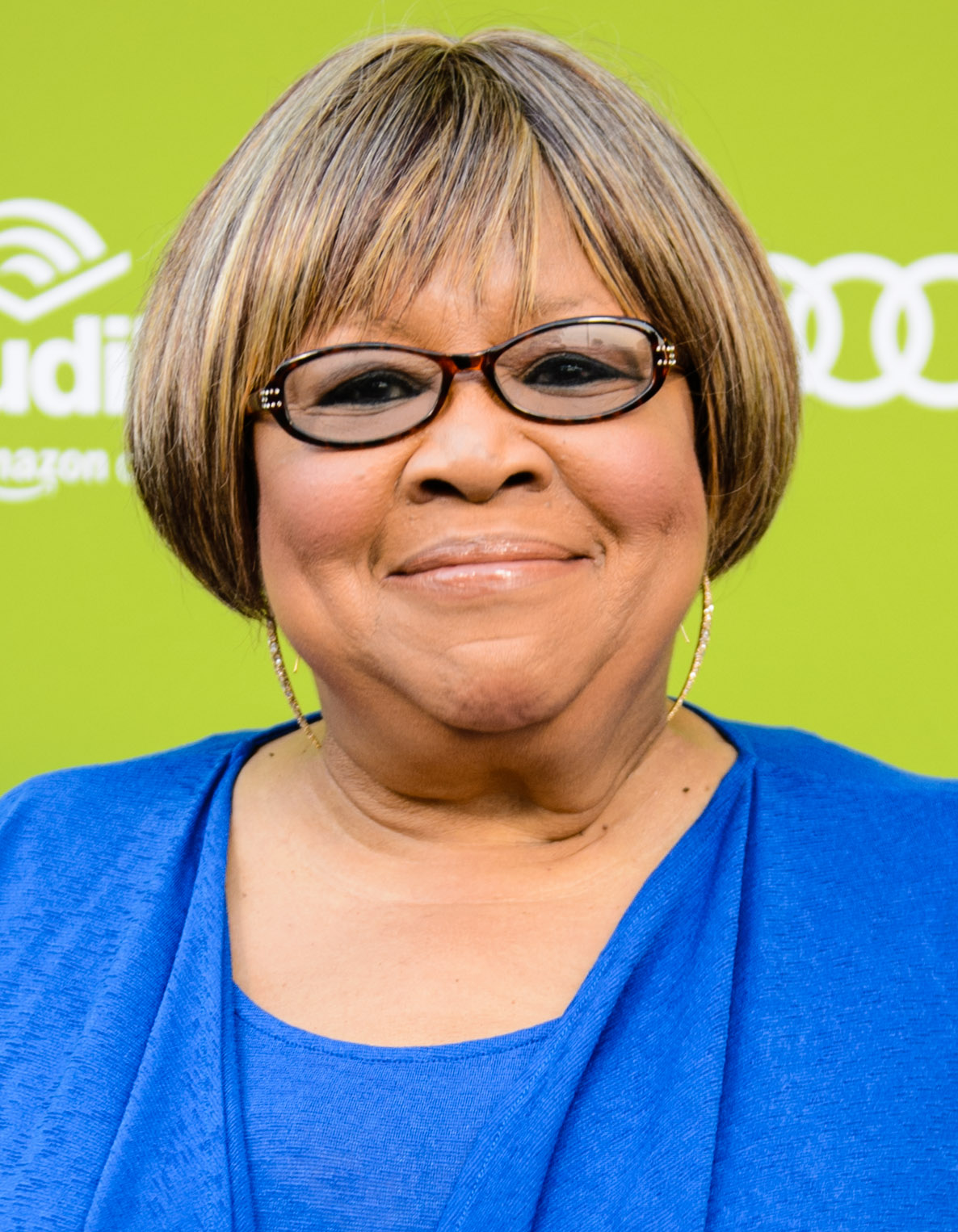
- Mavis Staples won the award in 2026 for "Godspeed".
- Awarded for: Quality Americana performances (tracks or singles only)
- Presented by: National Academy of Recording Arts and Sciences
- First award: 2023
- Currently held by: Mavis Staples – "Godspeed" (2026)
- Website: grammy.com

The Grammy Award for Best Americana Performance is an award presented by the Recording Academy to honor quality Americana performances in any given year. The award was presented for the first time on February 5, 2023, at the 65th Annual Grammy Awards.

The Academy announced the new category (as part of the American Roots Music genre field) in June 2022, stating that the award goes to "a track or single performance that recognizes artistic excellence in an Americana recording by a solo artist, collaborating artists, established duo, or established group". The category "recognizes excellence in performances of Americana music: contemporary music that incorporates elements of various American roots music and vocal styles, including country, roots rock, folk, bluegrass, R&B, and blues, resulting in a distinctive roots-oriented sound that lives in a world apart from the pure forms of the genres upon which it may draw.". The award sits together with other American Roots-themed awards such as Best American Roots Song, Best Americana Album and Best American Roots Performance.

The inaugural recipient of the award is Bonnie Raitt, who won for her song "Made Up Mind".

== Winners and nominees ==
Year	Artist	Work
2023
2023	Bonnie Raitt	"Made Up Mind"
2023	Eric Alexandrakis	"Silver Moon (A Tribute to Michael Nesmith)"
2023	Asleep at the Wheel featuring Lyle Lovett	"There You Go Again"
2023	The Blind Boys of Alabama featuring Black Violin	"The Message"
2023	Brandi Carlile featuring Lucius	"You and Me on the Rock"
2024
2024	Brandy Clark featuring Brandi Carlile	"Dear Insecurity"
2024	The Blind Boys of Alabama	"Friendship"
2024	Tyler Childers	"Help Me Make It Through the Night"
2024	Jason Isbell & the 400 Unit	"King of Oklahoma"
2024	Allison Russell	"The Returner"
2025
2025	Sierra Ferrell	"American Dreaming"
2025	Beyoncé	"Ya Ya"
2025	Madison Cunningham	"Subtitles"
2025	Madi Diaz featuring Kacey Musgraves	"Don't Do Me Good"
2025	Sarah Jarosz	"Runaway Train"
2025	Gillian Welch and David Rawlings	"Empty Trainload of Sky"
2026
2026	Mavis Staples	"Godspeed"
2026	Sierra Hull	"Boom"
2026	Maggie Rose and Grace Potter	"Poison in My Well"
2026	Molly Tuttle	"That's Gonna Leave a Mark"
2026	Jesse Welles	"Horses"
2027	Sara Bareilles	"Heartland"
2027	Brandi Carlile	"Returning to Myself"
2027	Mavis Staples	"Sad and Beautiful World"
2027	Billy Strings	"Mill Town Flood"
2027	Jesse Welles	"Masks Off"

== Multiple nominations ==
3 nominations

- Brandi Carlile

2 nominations

- The Blind Boys of Alabama
- Mavis Staples
- Jesse Welles
