= Grammy Award for Best American Roots Performance =

Grammy award category originated in 2015

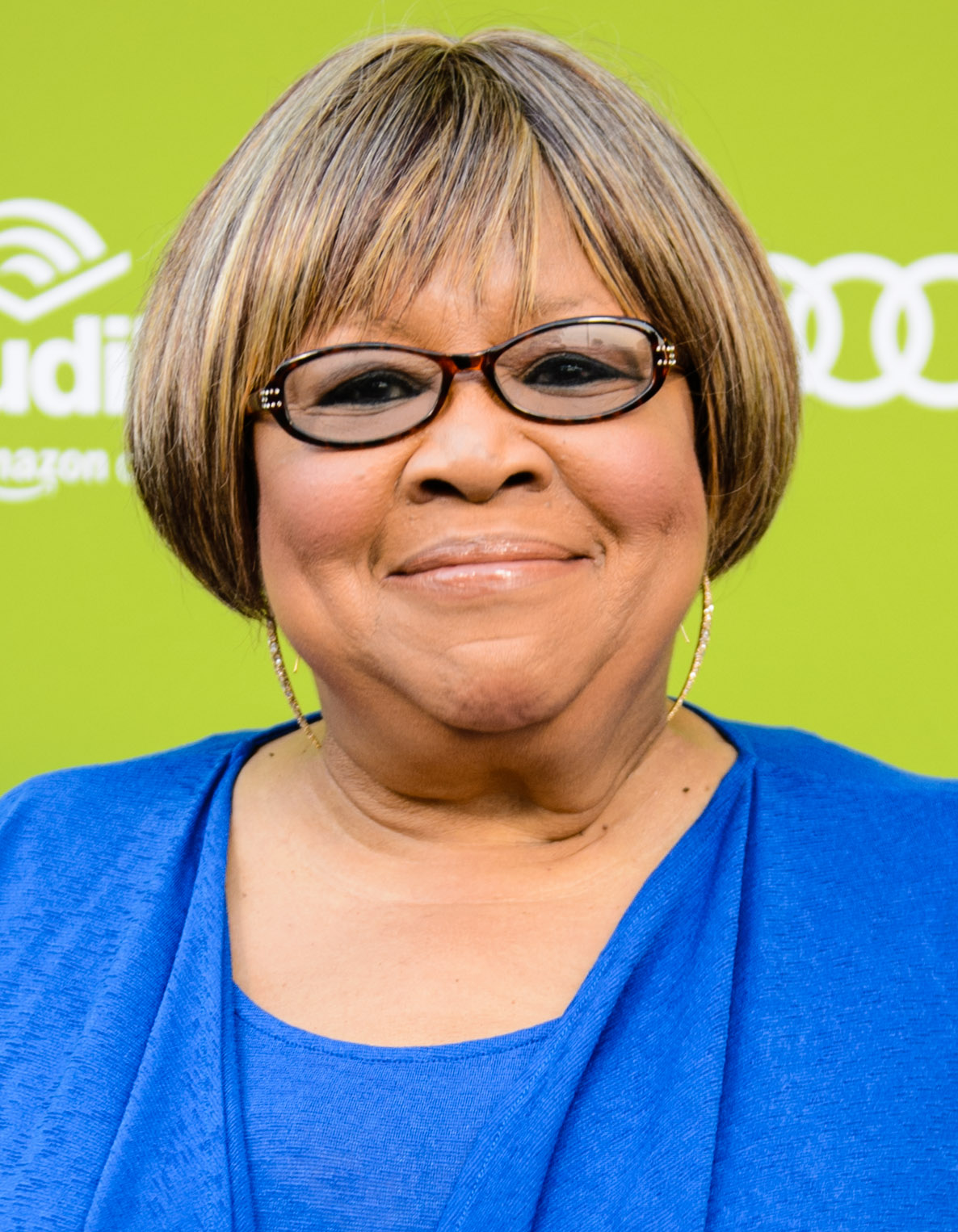
- "Beautiful Stranger" by Mavis Staples is the current recipient.
- Awarded for: Quality performances in the American Roots subgenres (folk, bluegrass, regional roots music, etc.)
- Country: United States
- Presented by: National Academy of Recording Arts and Sciences
- First award: 2015
- Currently held by: Mavis Staples – "Godspeed" (2026)
- Website: grammy.com

The Grammy Award for Best American Roots Performance is an award category at the annual Grammy Awards. It was first presented in 2015.

The award was first approved by the board of trustees of the Grammy Awards in June 2014. According to NARAS, the award encompasses all of the subgenres of the American Roots category field, which include bluegrass, blues, folk and regional roots styles of music such as Cajun, Hawaiian, Indigenous, Polka, Zydeco, go-go, second line brass, swamp pop, and Conjunto music. The category is open for solo artists, duos, groups and other collaborations and is for singles or tracks only. It was joined by a sister category, Best Americana Performance, in 2023.

The Grammy is awarded to the performer(s) of the winning recording.

== Winners and nominees ==
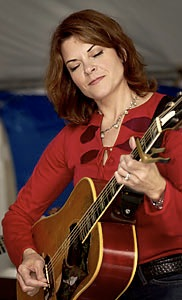
Inaugural recipient Rosanne Cash

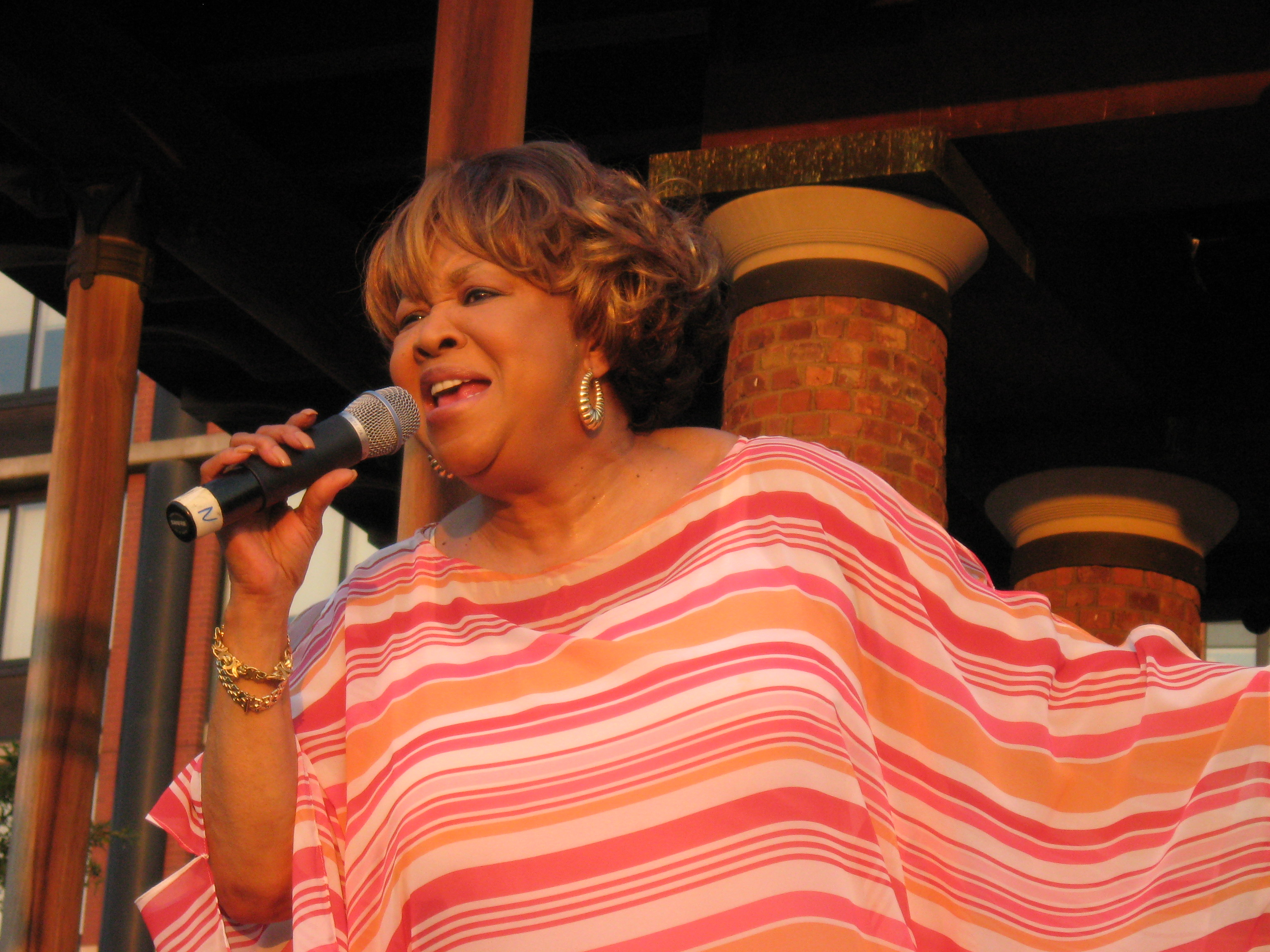
2016 and 2026 winner Mavis Staples

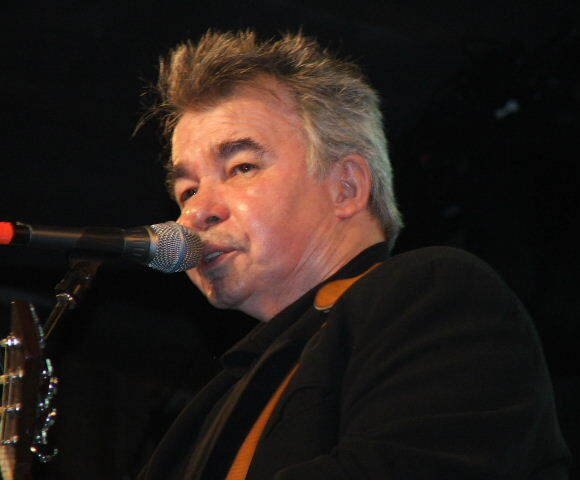
2021 honoree John Prine won the Grammy for "I Remember Everything", the final song he recorded before his death.

=== 2010s ===
Year	Work	Artist
2015
2015	Rosanne Cash	"A Feather's Not a Bird"
2015	Gregg Allman and Taj Mahal	"Statesboro Blues"
2015	Billy Childs featuring Alison Krauss and Jerry Douglas	"And When I Die"
2015	Keb' Mo' featuring the California Feet Warmers	"The Old Me Better"
2015	Nickel Creek	"Destination"
2016
2016	Mavis Staples	"See That My Grave Is Kept Clean"
2016	Béla Fleck and Abigail Washburn	"And Am I Born to Die"
2016	Buddy Guy	"Born to Play Guitar"
2016	The Milk Carton Kids	"City of Our Lady"
2016	Punch Brothers	"Julep"
2017
2017	Sarah Jarosz	"House of Mercy"
2017	The Avett Brothers	"Ain't No Man"
2017	Blind Boys of Alabama	"Mother's Children Have a Hard Time"
2017	Rhiannon Giddens	"Factory Girl"
2017	Lori McKenna	"Wreck You"
2018
2018	Alabama Shakes	"Killer Diller Blues"
2018	Blind Boys of Alabama	"Let My Mother Live"
2018	Glen Campbell	"Arkansas Farmboy"
2018	Leonard Cohen	"Steer Your Way"
2018	Alison Krauss	"I Never Cared for You"
2019
2019	Brandi Carlile	"The Joke"
2019	Sean Ardoin	"Kick Rocks"
2019	Jon Batiste	"St. James Infirmary Blues"
2019	Anderson East	"All on My Mind"
2019	Willie Nelson	"Last Man Standing"

=== 2020s ===
Year	Work	Artist
2020
2020	Sara Bareilles	"Saint Honesty"
2020	Calexico and Iron & Wine	"Father Mountain"
2020	Rhiannon Giddens and Francesco Turrisi	"I'm on My Way"
2020	I'm with Her	"Call My Name"
2020	Yola	"Faraway Look"
2021
2021	John Prine	"I Remember Everything"
2021	Black Pumas	"Colors"
2021	Bonny Light Horseman	"Deep in Love"
2021	Brittany Howard	"Short and Sweet"
2021	Norah Jones and Mavis Staples	"I'll Be Gone"
2022
2022	Jon Batiste	"Cry"
2022	Billy Strings	"Love and Regret"
2022	The Blind Boys of Alabama featuring Béla Fleck	"I Wish I Knew How It Would Feel to Be Free"
2022	Brandy Clark featuring Brandi Carlile	"Same Devil"
2022	Allison Russell	"Nightflyer"
2023
2023	Aaron Neville and The Dirty Dozen Brass Band	"Stompin' Ground"
2023	Bill Anderson featuring Dolly Parton	"Someday It'll All Make Sense"
2023	Madison Cunningham	"Life According to Raechel"
2023	Fantastic Negrito	"Oh Betty"
2023	Aoife O'Donovan and Alison Russell	"Prodigal Daughter"
2024
2024	Allison Russell	"Eve Was Black"
2024	Jon Batiste	"Butterfly"
2024	The Blind Boys of Alabama	"Heaven Help Us All"
2024	Madison Cunningham	"Inventing the Wheel"
2024	Rhiannon Giddens	"You Louisiana Man"
2025
2025	Sierra Ferrell	"Lighthouse"
2025	Shemekia Copeland	"Blame It on Eve"
2025	The Fabulous Thunderbirds featuring Bonnie Raitt, Keb' Mo', Taj Mahal and Mick Fleetwood	"Nothing in Rambling"
2025	Rhiannon Giddens	"The Ballad of Sally Anne"
2026
2026	Mavis Staples	"Beautiful Strangers"
2026	Jon Batiste featuring Randy Newman	"Lonely Avenue"
2026	I'm with Her	"Ancient Light"
2026	Jason Isbell	"Crimson and Clay"
2026	Alison Krauss & Union Station	"Richmond on the James"
2027
2027	Sara Bareilles	"Still Crying"
2027	Brandi Carlile	"You Without Me"
2027	Chuck Leah	"Coyote"
2027	Mavis Staples	"Human Mind"
2027	Jesse Welles featuring Joan Baez	"No Kings"

== Artists with multiple wins ==
2 wins

- Mavis Staples

== Artists with multiple nominations ==
4 nominations

- Jon Batiste
- The Blind Boys of Alabama
- Brandi Carlile
- Rhiannon Giddens
- Mavis Staples

3 nominations

- Sarah Jarosz (2 with I'm with Her)
- Alison Krauss
- Aoife O'Donovan (2 with I'm with Her)
- Allison Russell

2 nominations

- Sara Bareilles
- Madison Cunningham
- I'm with Her
- Keb' Mo'
- Taj Mahal
