= Po' Girl (album) =

Studio album by Po' Girl
- Released: June 10, 2003
- Genre: Folk
- Length: 54:10
- Label: Jericho Beach Music
- Producer: Po' Girl with Marc L'Espérance

Po' Girl chronology
Po' Girl	Vagabond Lullabies

Professional ratings
Review scores
Source	Rating
Allmusic	link

Po'Girl is the self-titled debut album by the Canadian group Po' Girl. It was released June 10, 2003. It was released in the United States on August 28, on HighTone Records, and in Europe on January 26, 2004, on Cadiz Music. Po' Girl on this album was Trish Klein and Allison Russell.

== Track listing ==
1. Gone In Pawn (Shake Sugaree) (Elizabeth Cotton, add. lyrics Allison Russell) 3:26
2. Bad Luck Day Baby (Allison Russell, Trish Klein) 3:05
3. City Song (Trish Klein) 4:52
4. Bleak St (Allison Russell, Trish Klein, with add. lyrics from Tom Waits) 3:33
5. Shameless (Trish Klein) 3:28
6. Malaise Days (Allison Russell, Trish Klein) 4:44
7. Cold Hungry Blues (Allison Russell, Trish Klein) 3:00
8. Backstairs Down (Trish Klein) 3:22
9. Abilene (Lester Brown, arr. Po' Girl) 3:39
10. Wheels Are Taking Me Away (Trish Klein) 4:14
11. What Sad Old Song? (Allison Russell, Trish Klein) 6:02
12. Lullabye (Allison Russell, Trish Klein) 2:32

== Personnel ==
- Trish Klein – Vocals, acoustic and electric guitar, banjo, harmonica (3)
- Allison Russell – Vocals, clarinet, pennywhistle, whistling
- Kenton Loewen – Percussion
- Roey Shemesh – Acoustic stand-up bass
- Frazey Ford – Harmonies (8 & 11)
- Anna Lumiere – Hammond, rhodes, wurlitzer (2 & 8)
- Les Mersa – Chromatic harmonica (1 & 9)
- Cr Avery – Beatboxing, harmonica (4)
- Marc L'Espérance – Harmonies (11)
- Jesse Zubot – Fiddle (5)
