= Birds of Chicago =

Americana/folk band from Chicago, IL

- Origin: Chicago, IL
- Genres: Folk, Americana
- Years active: 2012–2021 (on hiatus)
- Label: Signature Sounds
- Members: JT Nero; Allison Russell
- Website: birdsofchicago.com

Birds of Chicago is an Americana/folk band founded in March 2012 in Chicago, Illinois, United States. The band is led by husband and wife, JT Nero and Allison Russell. Russell is formerly of the Canadian roots act Po' Girl. The duo-fronted band refers to their music as "secular gospel".

Nero, a Midwesterner with strong family ties to Chicago, Illinois, has made the Windy City his home since 2002. Russell grew up in Montreal and has lived with Nero in Chicago since 2009. In 2014, Russell gave birth to their first daughter and hit the road with her four weeks later.

== History ==
Prior to officially forming Birds of Chicago in March 2012, Nero and Russell were in other musical projects. Nero (as Jeremy Lindsay) fronted The Rivermen, a popular band based in his hometown of Toledo, Ohio. Russell first began collaborating with Nero on his solo project, mountains/forests in 2011, while she continued with Po' Girl. Nero was also in another band, JT and the Clouds. The two developed a working relationship, as Po' Girl and JT and the Clouds traded shows across the Canadian/US border – Po' Girl would open for JT and the Clouds in the States and vice versa. In 2007, Nero opened as a solo act for Po' Girl's international Home To You CD release tour, their last record under Nettwerk Records in Vancouver.

=== Forming Birds of Chicago ===
At that point, Nero and Russell started getting serious about working together after their experience of recording mountains/forests together in 2011. They began by calling themselves 'JT Nero and Allison Russell' and doing duo shows here and there. They started incorporating and collaborating with various members of their extended musical families – many alumni of JT and The Clouds – and felt they needed a name that would better describe the musical collective they were creating. Birds of Chicago was the name they chose for their first studio album and decided to make that their band name.

The band self-released their album, self-titled Birds of Chicago, in June 2012 after a successful Kickstarter campaign. They played guerilla-style showcases at Folk Alliance in Memphis, Tennessee in February 2012, just before the album's release. They then started touring 200 days out of the year. Among their first performances were sets at Delfest, Strawberry Festival, and High Sierra Festival. Their first national tour saw them opening for Sean Hayes in October–November 2012. Throughout 2013 and 2014, they toured North America, parts of Europe, and the United Kingdom.

=== Marriage, touring and further recordings ===
In 2013, the duo were married and had a baby girl, Ida Maeve, touring through most of Russell's pregnancy. They hit the road at the end of January 2014 with their daughter who was only 4 weeks old . The Netherlands was her first tour, and then across the US and Canada. On December 5, 2014, they released their live record, Live From Space recorded at Evanston S.P.A.C.E. in Evanston, Illinois, just outside Chicago, Illinois.

In 2015, Joe Henry (Bonnie Raitt, Emmylou Harris & Rodney Crowell, Elvis Costello, Allen Toussaint, Ani DiFranco) agreed to produce their next record. They feverishly putting another Kickstarter campaign together met their initial 40K goal in just nine days. The final amount ended up being almost 81K. The success of the campaign allowed them to hire Sacks and Co. as publicists and make their first national press push. They recorded their forthcoming album, Blue Midnight throughout 2015 at Joe Henry's Garfield House, which had been his main studio for a decade. It was the last project in the Garfield House—a bittersweet experience. In 2016, Birds of Chicago released their second studio album, 'Real Midnight', also produced by Henry The album garnered the band's first NPR coverage in February.

In 2017, Birds of Chicago signed with Signature Sounds Recordings in Massachusetts, releasing their label debut on November 17, American Flowers, a digital-only EP. The recording was produced by Jim Jam and Borgo Entertainment (a.k.a. Norene and Ben Lindsay) and Koitz International (a.k.a. Gretchen, David, and Kevin Koitz). In 2018, the band released their third studio album, Love In Wartime, produced by Luther Dickinson and Nero himself.

=== Additional project, indefinite hiatus ===
In 2019, Russell collaborated with three other established musicians in recording Songs of Our Native Daughters, an album addressing a range of American socio-historical issues, including slavery, racism and misogyny. The album, on the Smithsonian Folkways label, also features MacArthur Fellows "genius grant" recipient Rhiannon Giddens; Leyla McCalla, who with Giddens was a member of the group Carolina Chocolate Drops; and Amythyst Kiah, a Tennessee alt-country blues singer and banjo player. Russell wrote two of the album's 13 songs and co-wrote five others. Her contributions also included lead and backing vocals, as well as 5-string banjo and percussion.

After relocating to Nashville, Russell and Nero announced in February 2021 that Birds of Chicago would go on "indefinite hiatus" in order to focus on the release of Russell's solo album, 'Outside Child.'

== Accolades ==
In 2014, Paul Kerr of Blabber 'n' Smoke included Live From Space on his "Best Of" list. The album was also named one of 2014's best country albums by The London Telegraph, describing it as "An atmospheric live album from Birds of Chicago, which captures the stylish music of JT Nero and Allison Russell, whose self-titled, debut album last year was such a treat."

2016 proved to be a big year for the band. Paste Magazine premiered their first single "Real Midnight," the title track of their 2016 release, calling the band an "Americana gospel dream team." For the month of March, Real Midnight was #1 on the Euro-Americana Chart, and NPR included their "Dim Star Of The Palisades" single on "Heavy Rotation: 10 Songs Public Radio Can't Stop Playing" on March 8.

NPR's Folk Alley included Real Midnight in their top 10 favorite albums of the year, coming in at #6; and it also landed #1 on Josh Hurst's All For The Sake of the Song's Favorite Albums of 2016 list.

In 2017, Slant Magazine named "American Flowers" 19 on their "25 Best Singles of 2017" list.

== Discography ==
=== Studio albums ===
Birds Of Chicago (October 1, 2012)
No.	Title	Writer(s)	Length
1.	"Trampoline"	Jeremy Lindsay	4:32
2.	"Cannonball"	Jeremy Lindsay	4:08
3.	"Before She Goes"	Jeremy Lindsay	3:49
4.	"Moonglow Tapeworm"	Jeremy Lindsay	3:10
5.	"Sans Souci"	Allison Russell	4:21
6.	"Flying Dreams"	Jeremy Lindsay	4:23
7.	"Galaxy Ballroom"	Jeremy Lindsay	5:04
8.	"Come Morning"	Jeremy Lindsay	3:19
9.	"Sugar Dumplin'"	Jeremy Lindsay	3:19
10.	"Old Calcutta"	Jeremy Lindsay	5:27
11.	"Humboldt Crows"	Jeremy Lindsay	5:14
12.	"The Wide Sea"	Jeremy Lindsay	4:54

Real Midnight (2016)
No.	Title	Length
1.	"Dim Star of the Palisades"	2:58
2.	"Remember Wild Horses"	4:47
3.	"Kinderspel (child's game)"	5:59
4.	"Estrella Goodbye"	3:12
5.	"Real Midnight"	5:38
6.	"Barley"	3:04
7.	"Color of Love"	3:25
8.	"Time and Times"	4:16
9.	"Sparrow"	3:52
10.	"The Good Fight"	3:17
11.	"Pelicans"	4:17

Love in Wartime (2018)
No.	Title	Writer(s)	Publisher	Length
1.	"Intro: Now/Sunlight"	D. Lindsay & A. Russell	Herculean Effort, BMI / Po Girl Music, SOCAN/ASCAP	1:03
2.	"Never Go Back"	JT Nero & A. Russell	Chicago Bird Music, BMI / Po Girl Music, SOCAN/ASCAP	2:33
3.	"Love In Wartime"	JT Nero	Chicago Bird Music, BMI	5:50
4.	"Travelers"	JT Nero	Chicago Bird Music, BMI	4:40
5.	"Try"	JT Nero & C. Merrill	Chicago Bird Music, BMI / Chris Merrill, ASCAP	5:11
6.	"Lodestar"	JT Nero	Chicago Bird Music, BMI	4:38
7.	"Roll Away"	JT Nero	Chicago Bird Music, BMI	2:40
8.	"Baton Rouge"	JT Nero & A. Russell	Chicago Bird Music, BMI / Po Girl Music, SOCAN/ASCAP	6:07
9.	"Roisin Starchild"	JT Nero & A. Russell	Chicago Bird Music, BMI / Po Girl Music, SOCAN/ASCAP	4:50
10.	"Superlover"	JT Nero	Chicago Bird Music, BMI	3:53
11.	"Derecho"	JT Nero	Chicago Bird Music, BMI	4:05

=== Live albums ===
Live from Space (2013)
No.	Title	Length
1.	"Barley"	2:53
2.	"All the City Girls"	4:17
3.	"I Have Heard Words"	4:10
4.	"Sugar Dumplin'"	5:21
5.	"Sans Souci"	4:22
6.	"Prairie Lullaby"	4:35
7.	"Mountains / Forests"	3:58
8.	"Kathy"	4:43
9.	"Cannonball"	4:14
10.	"Sparrow"	3:48
11.	"Funeral"	3:53
12.	"Nobody Wants to Be Alone Nobody Wants to Die"	4:50
13.	"North Star"	4:38
14.	"Firespitter"	5:22
15.	"Fever Dream"	5:26
16.	"Trampoline"	5:06
17.	"'Til It's Gone"	7:42

=== EPs ===
American Flowers (2017)
No.	Title	Writer(s)	Publisher	Length
1.	"Alright Alright"	JT Nero	Chicago Bird Music, BMI	4:03
2.	"Eastern Sky"	JT Nero	Chicago Bird Music, BMI	5:41
3.	"Farewell Tenderhearts"	JT Nero	Chicago Bird Music, BMI	4:52
4.	"Hold Steady/Rock Slow"	JT Nero	Chicago Bird Music, BMI	5:15
5.	"American Flowers"	JT Nero	Chicago Bird Music, BMI	6:11
6.	"Étoile d' Amour (Stardust)"	JT Nero	Chicago Bird Music, BMI	4:36

=== Singles ===
Year	Single	Writer(s)	Album
2016	"Dim Star of the Palisades"	Birds of Chicago	Real Midnight
2017	"American Flowers"	Birds of Chicago	American Flowers
2018	"Roll Away"	Birds of Chicago	Love in Wartime
2018	"Never Go Back"	Birds of Chicago	Love in Wartime
