= Songs of Our Native Daughters =

Studio album by Our Native Daughters
- Released: February 22, 2019
- Genres: Americana, folk
- Length: 52:13
- Label: Smithsonian Folkways
- Producers: Rhiannon Giddens and Dirk Powell

Songs of Our Native Daughters is the debut Americana/folk album by four North American singer-songwriters collaborating as Our Native Daughters. The group includes Rhiannon Giddens, Amythyst Kiah, Leyla McCalla, and Allison Russell. The album was released on the Smithsonian Folkways label in early 2019.

Songs of Our Native Daughters addresses American historical issues that have influenced the identity of black women, including slavery, racism, and sexism. The album features 13 songs, 11 of them written by the group's members. It also includes a cover of a 1970s Bob Marley classic and a song that draws its lyrics from two poems.

The album was co-produced by Giddens, who conceived the project, and Dirk Powell, who holds four Grammy Awards and has worked with Giddens on previous albums. It was recorded in 10 days at Powell's studio in a pre-Civil War building outside Lafayette, Louisiana.

== Themes ==
The idea for Our Native Daughters was conceived by Giddens whose previous album, Freedom Highway, dealt with slavery and the Civil Rights Era. The project was inspired by two experiences. The first was a visit she made with her seven-year-old daughter to the Smithsonian's National Museum of African American History and Culture in Washington, D.C. During a private tour, Giddens encountered a quote from an 18th century poem that she felt needed to be in a song:

I am shock'd at the purchase of slaves
...but I must be mum, for how could we do without sugar or rum?

— William Cowper, "Pity for Poor Africans"

Her second experience was a screening of Nate Parker's controversial 2016 film Birth of a Nation. In the album's liner notes, Giddens writes that she was upset by the scene in the film where an enslaved woman is raped by the plantation owner's friend. What particularly outraged Giddens was that the camera was on the face of the woman's husband, not on her suffering.

Giddens' original intent was to make art from historical words and observations about slavery. She also wanted to focus on the banjo and its role in 19th century black minstrel music. After some reflection, as well as conversations with Dirk Powell, she decided to do a collaborative project that would include other black female artists. The concept for the album began to change during the early recording sessions as Russell, Kiah and McCalla suggested a range of ideas for new songs centering on the legacies that helped shape the present day identity of black women. With that, Giddens broadened the theme to emphasize stories of "struggle, resistance and hope". The result is a collection of songs that address issues ranging from slavery and colonialism to racism and sexism.

More than half of the album's songs explore aspects of slavery and its aftermath. Some of these as well as others deal with the specific experiences of black women. Meanwhile, Giddens' initial concept of celebrating black minstrel music was not abandoned. Two of her four contributions focus on the historical role of the banjo as the first "truly American" instrument. As she points out in the liner notes, the instrument was first used exclusively by black musicians, but in the latter part of the 1800s, it became identified with white males who performed minstrel music in blackface, at the time a highly popular form of entertainment.

== Critical reception ==
Professional ratings
Review scores
Source	Rating
AllMusic	4.5/5 stars
The Guardian	5/5 stars
Paste	9.1/10

Upon its release, Songs of Our Native Daughters was welcomed with universal applause.

Laura Barton for The Guardian called it a "proud, devastating [and] authoritative" work.

== Group members ==
The members of Our Native Daughters were brought together by Giddens, who selected the group's name in reference to James Baldwin's 1955 book Notes of a Native Son. Following are profiles of the group's members:

Rhiannon Giddens, a vocalist and banjo player, is a founding member of the Grammy Award-winning group Carolina Chocolate Drops. She was nominated for a Grammy in 2017 for her second solo studio album Freedom Highway, which was produced by Powell. Among other honors, she was awarded a MacArthur Fellowship "genius grant" in 2017 for her contributions to folk and country music as an African American.

Amythyst Kiah is a native of Chattanooga, Tennessee and currently lives in Johnson City. Kiah is a graduate of East Tennessee State University, where she completed the Bluegrass, Old Time, and Country Music Studies program. She plays guitar and banjo.

Leyla McCalla, who is of Haitian descent, was born in New York City. After studying classical music briefly at New York University, she relocated to New Orleans, where she was recruited to join the Carolina Chocolate Drops while performing as a street musician. She has since recorded three solo albums. Her most recent release, Capitalist Blues, reached number 14 on Billboard's Jazz Albums chart in early 2019. McCalla's primary instrument is the cello, though she also plays banjo and guitar.

Allison Russell was born in Montreal, Quebec, Canada and currently resides in Nashville, Tennessee. A multi-instrumentalist, she is a founding member of two roots groups. In 2003, Russell joined with Trish Klein of Be Good Tanyas to form Po' Girl in Canada, which recorded six albums, the last in 2010. Two years later, she joined with her now-husband JT Nero to form the group Birds of Chicago in the U.S., releasing four albums and an EP (as of 2018). Russell plays guitar, banjo, ukulele, and clarinet.

Another Canadian, singer-songwriter Kaia Kater, was also invited to participate in Our Native Daughters but was unable to because of scheduling commitments.

== Track listing ==
No.	Title	Writer(s)	Length
1.	"Black Myself"	Kiah	3:54
2.	"Moon Meets the Sun"	Giddens/Kiah/Russell	4:07
3.	"Barbados"	Giddens (from poems by William Cowper, Dirk Powell)	5:52
4.	"Quasheba, Quasheba"	Russell	4:42
5.	"I Knew I Could Fly"	McCalla/Russell	3:41
6.	"Polly Ann's Hammer"	Kiah/Russell	2:59
7.	"Mama's Cryin' Long"	Giddens	2:11
8.	"Slave Driver"	Bob Marley	4:41
9.	"Better Git Yer Learnin'"	Tom Briggs/Giddens	3:56
10.	"Lavi Difisil"	McCalla/Russell	2:30
11.	"Blood and Bones"	Kiah/Russell	4:45
12.	"Music and Joy"	Giddens/Powell	2:30
13.	"You're Not Alone"	Russell	5:36
Total length:			52:13

== Personnel ==
Our Native Daughters

- Rhiannon Giddens: vocals, banjos (5-string and minstrel), fiddle, percussion
- Amythyst Kiah: vocals, 5-string banjo, percussion
- Leyla McCalla: vocals, cello, tenor banjo, guitar
- Allison Russell: vocals, 5-string banjo, clarinet, ukulele

Additional musicians

- Jamie Dick: drums, percussion
- Dirk Powell: guitars (acoustic, electric, and electric baritone), mandolin, banjo, fiddle, accordion
- Jason Sypher: bass
