= Leyla McCalla =

American classical and folk musician (born 1985)

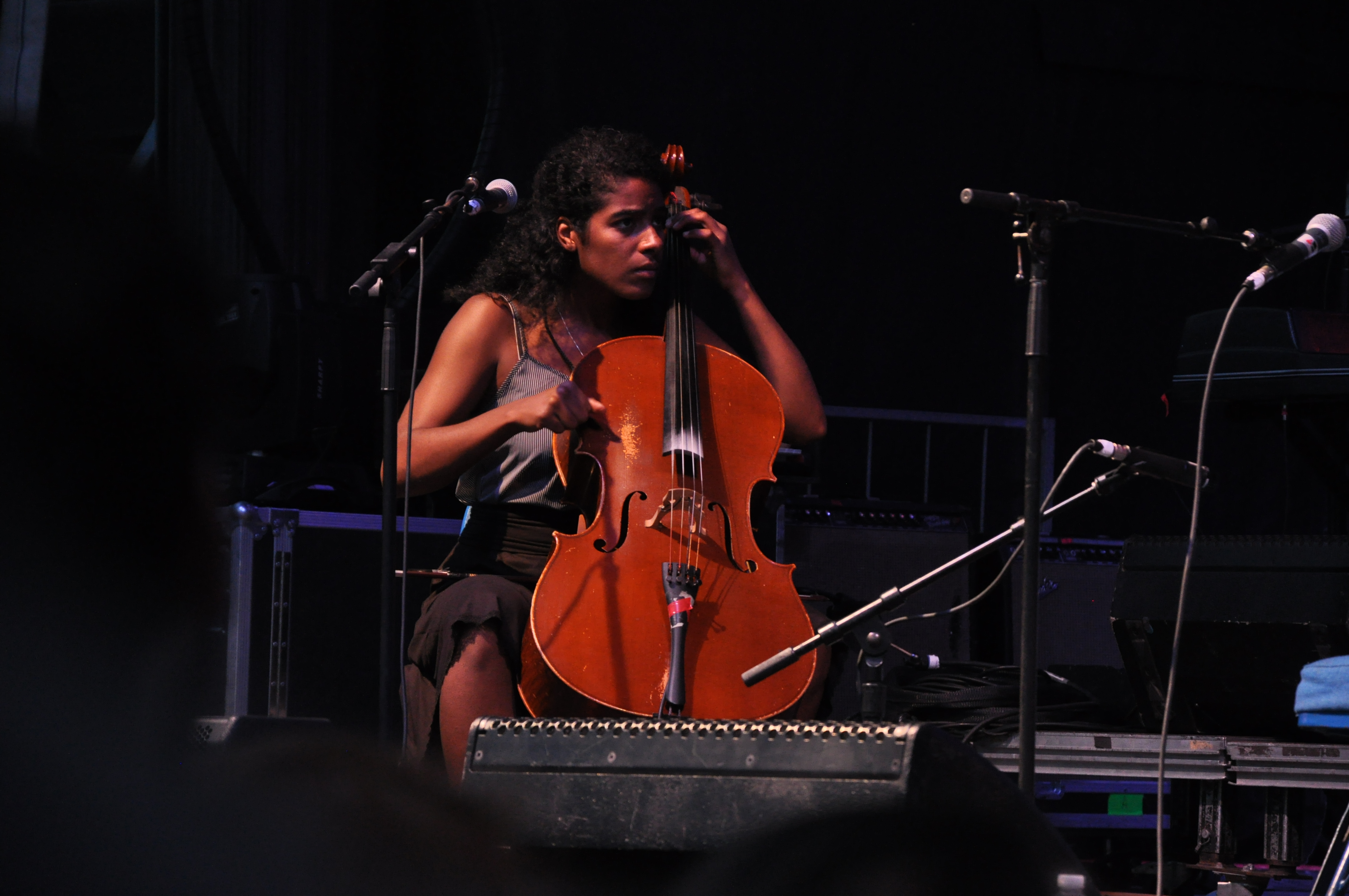
- Leyla McCalla in concert with the Carolina Chocolate Drops in September 2012
- Born: Leyla Sarah McCalla; October 3, 1985 (age 41); New York City, United States
- Occupations: Singer; songwriter; cellist
- Musical career
- Genres: Haitian folk; Louisiana folk; Classical; Folk
- Instruments: Vocals; Cello; Banjo; Guitar
- Labels: Music Maker; Jazz Village/PIAS
- Website: leylamccalla.com

Leyla Sarah McCalla (born October 3, 1985) is an American classical and folk musician. She was a cellist with the Grammy Award–winning string band Carolina Chocolate Drops, but left to focus on her solo career.

== Background ==
Both of McCalla's parents were born in Haiti. Her father Jocelyn McCalla was the Executive Director of the New York–based National Coalition for Haitian Rights from 1988 to 2006 and is credited as translator on her album Vari-Colored Songs. Her mother Régine Dupuy arrived in the United States at age 5, and is the daughter of Ben Dupuy who ran Haïti Progrès, a New York–based Haitian socialist newspaper. McCalla's mother went on to found Dwa Fanm, an anti-domestic violence human rights organization. McCalla's younger sister, Sabine McCalla, is also a musician in New Orleans.

McCalla was born in Queens, New York City, and raised in Maplewood, New Jersey, where she attended Columbia High School. She lived in Accra, Ghana for two years as a teen. After a year at Smith College, she transferred to New York University to study cello performance and chamber music. In 2010 she then moved to New Orleans where she honed her craft playing music on the streets of the French Quarter. In addition to cello, she also plays banjo and guitar.

== Career ==
From 2011 to 2013, McCalla was a member of the Carolina Chocolate Drops. As of 2019 she is a member of Our Native Daughters.

As of 2017, McCalla was touring with her New Orleans–based trio, which also included Québécois Daniel Tremblay on guitar, banjo, and iron triangle (ti fer); and Free Feral on vocals and guitar.

In 2019 to 2020, McCalla toured with her Leyla McCalla Quartet, which included New Orleans musicians Dave Hammer (electric guitar), Shawn Myers (drums/percussion), and Pete Olynciw (electric and acoustic bass).

== First album ==
McCalla's critically acclaimed album Vari-Colored Songs is a tribute to Langston Hughes, which included adaptations of his poems, Haitian folk songs sung in Haitian Creole, and original compositions. McCalla says the first song she wrote for the album was "Heart of Gold" because it provided "a window into Hughes' thinking". McCalla chose to dedicate this work to Hughes because she says "reading his work made me want to be an artist." McCalla started working on the album 5 years prior to its release. Commentators have noted the influence of Louisiana musical traditions such as old Cajun fiddle melodies and trad-jazz banjo on the album. Members of the Carolina Chocolate Drops appear on the album. The album was financed at least in part through a crowdfunding campaign on Kickstarter which exceeded its goal of $5,000 to raise $20,000.

== Personal life ==
McCalla lives in the New Orleans area and has three children.

== Discography ==
- Vari-Colored Songs: A Tribute to Langston Hughes (February 4, 2014, Music Maker)
- A Day for the Hunter, A Day for the Prey (May 20, 2016, Jazz Village/Harmonia Mundi)
- Capitalist Blues (January 25, 2019, Jazz Village/PIAS)
- Breaking the Thermometer (May 6, 2022, Anti-)
- Sun Without the Heat (April 12, 2024, Anti-)

=== Collaborations ===
- Carolina Chocolate Drops: Leaving Eden (February 24, 2012, Nonesuch)
- Our Native Daughters: Songs of Our Native Daughters (February 22, 2019, Smithsonian Folkways)
