= Tomorrow Is My Turn =

Tomorrow Is My Turn may refer to:

- Tomorrow Is My Turn (film) (Le Passage du Rhin), 1960 film starring Charles Aznavour
- "Tomorrow Is My Turn" (song), English version for Nina Simone of "L'Amour, c'est comme un jour" 1962 Charles Aznavour song
- Tomorrow Is My Turn (album), a 2015 album by Rhiannon Giddens
