= Dom Flemons =

American musician (born 1982)

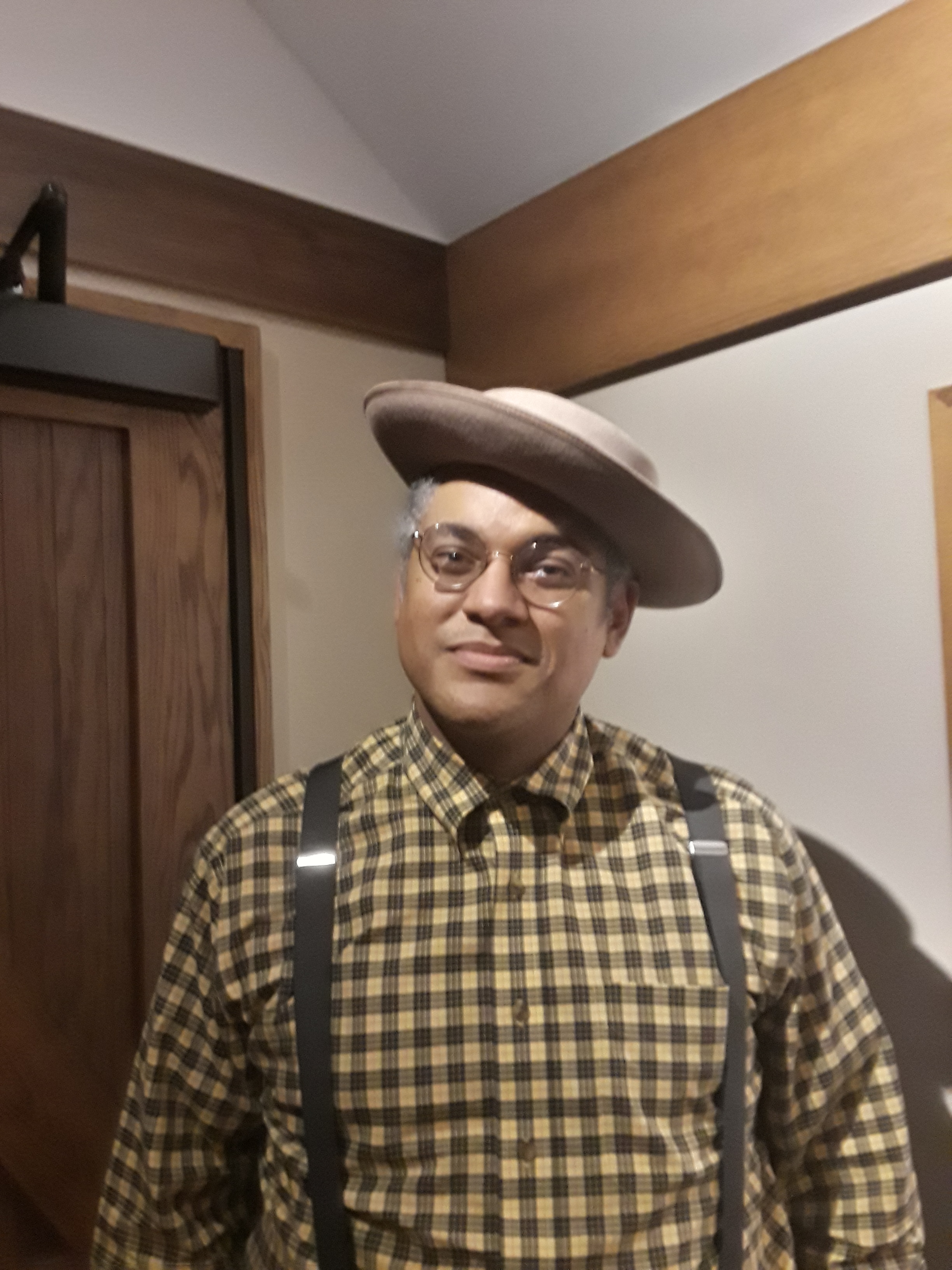
- Dom Flemons in September 2021, after a performance at The Barns at Wolf Trap

Background information
- Born: Dominique Flemons; August 30, 1982 (age 44); Phoenix, Arizona, United States
- Genres: Old-time music; Piedmont blues; Neotraditionalist country; folk
- Occupations: Multi-instrumentalist; singer; songwriter
- Instruments: Banjo; jug; percussion; quills; guitar; harmonica; drums; fife; kazoo; vocals
- Years active: 2000s–present
- Label: Various
- Website: theamericansongster.com

Dominique Flemons (born August 30, 1982) is an American old-time music, Piedmont blues, and neotraditional country multi-instrumentalist, singer, and songwriter. He is known as "The American Songster" as his repertoire of music spans nearly a century of American folklore, ballads, and tunes. He has performed with Mike Seeger, Joe Thompson, Martin Simpson, Boo Hanks, Taj Mahal, Old Crow Medicine Show, Guy Davis, and The Reverend Peyton's Big Damn Band.

A member of the Carolina Chocolate Drops from their inception in 2005 until 2013, Flemons has released five solo albums, with two albums being collaborations with other musicians. His 2018 album Black Cowboys was nominated for a Grammy Award for Best Folk Album at the 61st Annual Grammy Awards, and for a Blues Music Award at the 40th Blues Music Award ceremony in the 'Acoustic Album' category. His 2023 album Traveling Wildfire was also nominated for a Grammy Award for Best Folk Album, at the 66th Annual Grammy Awards.

== Biography ==
=== Early life ===
Flemons was born in Phoenix, Arizona, United States. He is of African American and Mexican heritage. He played percussion in his high school band, and whilst a teenager played guitar and harmonica in local coffee houses. He grew up listening to his parents' record collection, and expanded his knowledge by studying recordings by Bob Dylan, the Beatles, and Chuck Berry. This led him to the pioneers of American folk music, including Woody Guthrie, Tom Paxton, and Ramblin' Jack Elliott. Flemons became a frequent busker and performer on the Arizona music scene. He obtained a major in English at Northern Arizona University, in Flagstaff, Arizona, and partook in two national poetry slams in 2002 and 2003. In Flagstaff, Flemons met Sule Greg Wilson, a local percussionist, banjo player, and folklorist. Wilson became a mentor to Flemons, assisting with his playing techniques and understanding of the history of the blues and American folk music.

=== Carolina Chocolate Drops ===
The Carolina Chocolate Drops is an old-time string band from Durham, North Carolina. Their 2010 album, Genuine Negro Jig, won the Grammy Award for Best Traditional Folk Album at the 53rd Annual Grammy Awards.

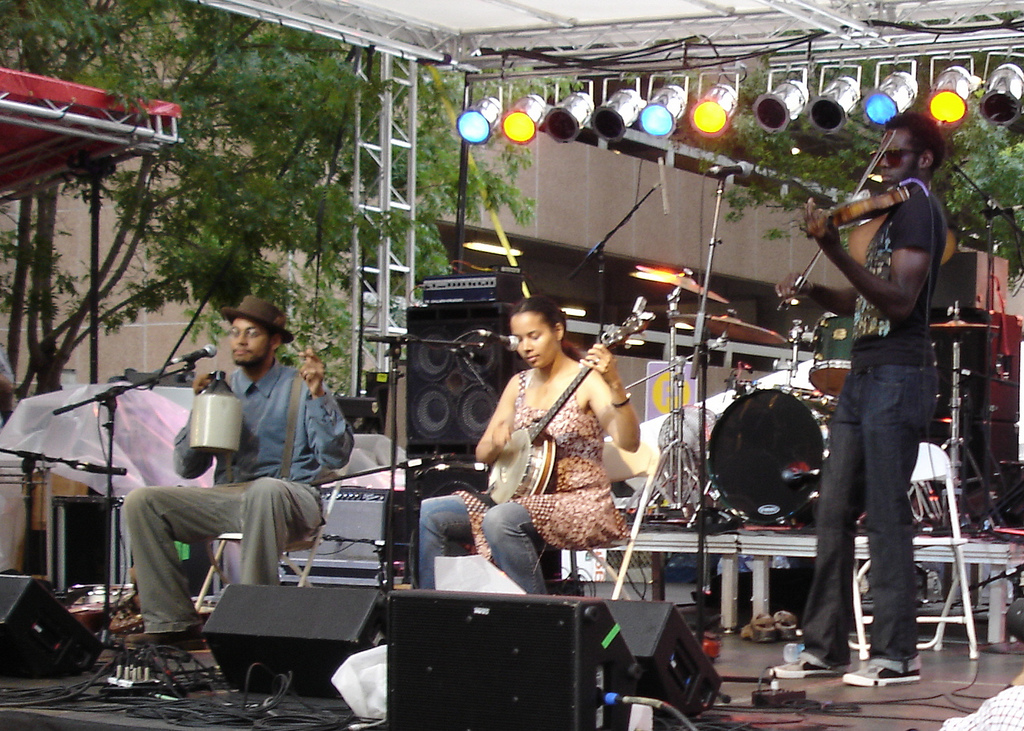
The Carolina Chocolate Drops performing at the City Stages Festival, in Birmingham, Alabama, United States in 2008. From left to right: Dom Flemons, jug; Rhiannon Giddens, 5-string banjo; Justin Robinson, fiddle

Formed in November 2005, following the members' attendance at the first Black Banjo Gathering, held in Boone, North Carolina, in April 2005, the group grew out of the success of Sankofa Strings, an ensemble that featured Dom Flemons on bones, jug, guitar, and four-string banjo, Rhiannon Giddens on banjo and fiddle and Súle Greg Wilson on bodhrán, brushes, washboard, bones, tambourine, banjo, banjolin, and ukulele, with Justin Robinson as an occasional guest artist.

The Carolina Chocolate Drops released five albums including 2012's Leaving Eden, and one EP, whilst Flemons was a member, and opened for Taj Mahal and, in 2011, Bob Dylan. They performed on Mountain Stage, MerleFest, and at the Mount Airy Fiddlers Convention. Additionally they have performed on A Prairie Home Companion, Fresh Air, and BBC Radio in early 2010, and at the 2010 Bonnaroo Music Festival in Manchester, Tennessee, and at the 2011 Romp, in Owensboro, Kentucky. On January 17, 2012, they appeared live on BBC Radio 3. They performed on the Grand Ole Opry several times. They also appeared on the UK's BBC Television program, Later... with Jools Holland.

On November 12, 2013, the Carolina Chocolate Drops announced that Flemons would be leaving to continue his own solo career.

=== Solo career ===
Flemons' solo career began while he was still a member of the Carolina Chocolate Drops. He self-released his debut solo album in 2007, Dance Tunes Ballads & Blues. His next album was issued the following year. American Songster was Flemons' first release on Music Maker. He was then featured on NPR performing at the Newport Folk Festival. Over the past decade Flemons has performed as a soloist at venues such as, Carnegie Hall as part of a Lead Belly tribute; Cecil Sharp House; the Grand Ole Opry; at the opening ceremonies for the National Museum of African American History and Culture; at the National Cowboy Poetry Gathering; and representing the United States at the 2017 Rainforest World Music Festival in Kuching, Malaysia.

In 2014, Prospect Hill saw Flemons enlist other musicians on his recording. These included Ron Brendle (bass), Guy Davis (banjo, harmonica, percussion and backing vocals), Keith Ganz (banjo and guitar), Brian Horton (clarinet, saxophone), Ben Hunter (drums, fiddle, backing vocals), Pura Fé (backing vocals), Joe Seamons (backing vocals) and Kobie Watkins (drums). The album saw releases on both the Fat Possum and Music Maker labels. The album received national press coverage. Prospect Hill contained seven of Flemons' own penned tracks out of a total of fourteen on the collection. Flemons was then a member of Music Maker Relief Foundation's Next Generation Artists program, and served on Music Maker's board of directors. He continues to discover young talent for the Foundation to assist and has promoted, recorded, and performed with more mature Music Maker artists including John Dee Holeman, Boo Hanks, Captain Luke, and Macavine Hayes.

Black Cowboys, Flemons' next album, entailed depicting the story of African Americans who helped to shape the American West, and the tunes they were familiar with. They included "Home on the Range", which the field recorder and musicologist John Lomax recorded from a Black cook in San Antonio, and "Goodbye Old Paint," which was first recorded by Lomax, but Flemons discovered that "another musician talked about how he learned the song from an ex-slave who worked for his father on the ranch." That has been credited as the Black cowboy and former slave, Charley Willis. Thus the songs and poems that were used in the ensuing album depicted a century-old story, following the footsteps of thousands of African American pioneers. These included American cowboy Nat Love and Bass Reeves, the first Black Deputy US Marshal west of the Mississippi, who some believe was the model for the Lone Ranger. Flemons duly wrote a song about the leading black movie cowboy of his time, Bill Pickett, and used other stories including cowboys who became Pullman porters and, in turn, became important figures in the civil rights movement. Black Cowboys (2018) was issued as part of the African American Legacy Recordings series issued in conjunction with the Smithsonian Institution's National Museum of African American History and Culture. Flemons played old musical instruments such as the six-string banjo and the quills, as was originally used by Henry Thomas.

In 2017, Flemons was featured on David Holt's State of Music on PBS. He also performed as the bluesman Joe Hill Louis on CMT's television program Sun Records. Flemons launched a podcast, American Songster Radio, on WUNC National Public Radio and issued a couple of instructional DVD's via Stefan Grossman’s Guitar Workshop.

== Collaborations ==
In 2012, Flemons collaborated to record an album with the Piedmont blues guitarist and singer Boo Hanks, entitled Buffalo Junction. Four years later, Flemons played along with the British guitarist Martin Simpson, to jointly record the album, A Selection of Ever Popular Favourites. It was released on Fledg'ling Records.

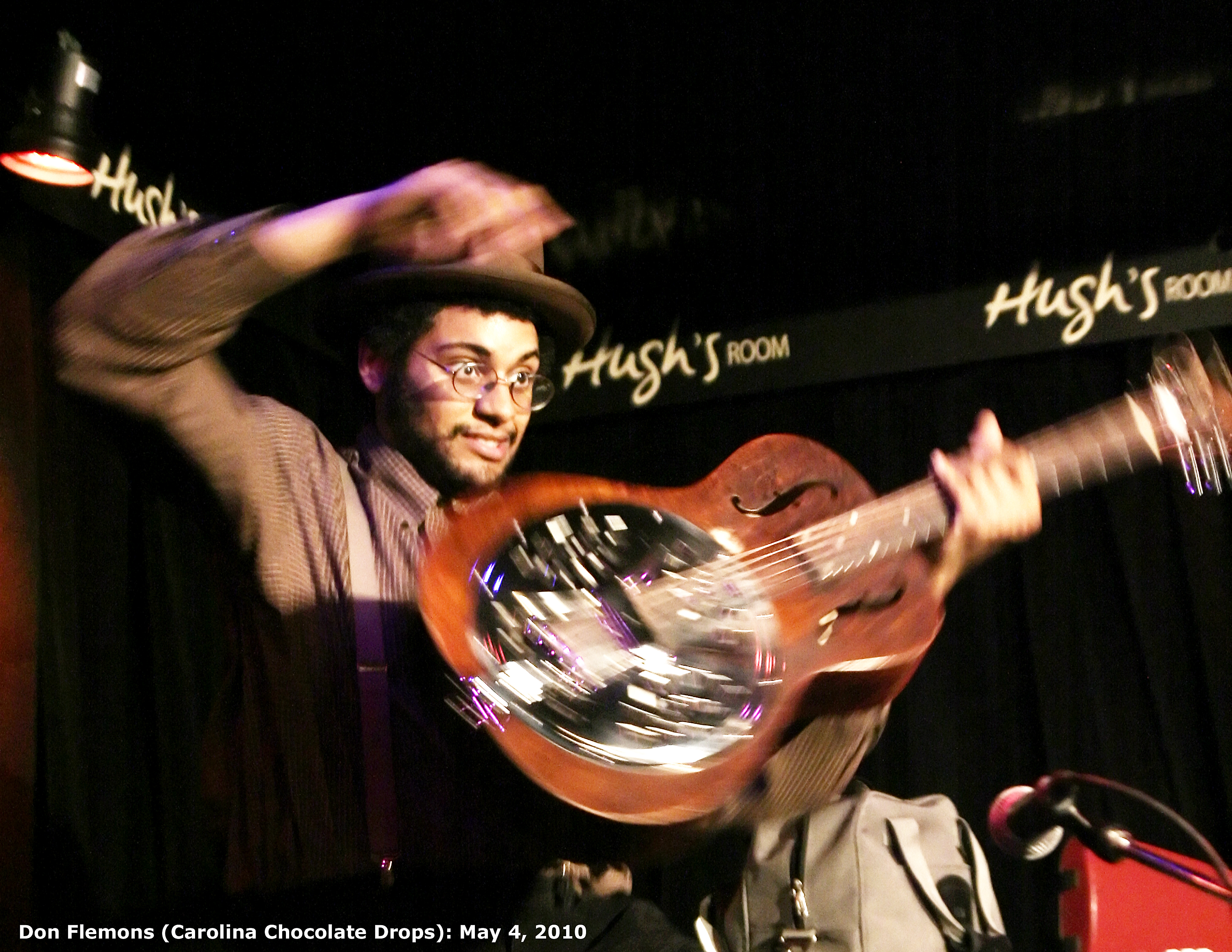
Dom Flemons in May 2010, performing at Hugh's Room

== Artistry ==
Flemons' foremost instrument is the banjo, with Mike Seeger having had an influence on Flemons playing style. Flemons plays a Deering 4-string banjo, a Gibson GB-1 6-string and a rare, oversized 1920s era Clef Club banjo.

== Personal life ==
As of 2019, Flemons lived in the Washington, D.C. area. As of 2025, he had been living in the Chicago, Illinois, area for several years. In 2017 he married Vania Kinard (who also serves as his manager and creative collaborator), and they have one daughter, Cheyanne Love.

== Accolades and awards ==
The Boston Globe wrote that "most folk artists go by 'singer-songwriter' or simply 'musician.' But 'American songster' speaks to a greater truth about the work Flemons, a multi-instrumentalist, has accomplished as a founding member of the Carolina Chocolate Drops and (...) as a solo artist."

Flemons won a Grammy Award as part of the Carolina Chocolate Drops for their album, Genuine Negro Jig. His latest solo album, Black Cowboys (2018), was nominated for a Grammy Award for Best Folk Album and for a 2019 Blues Music Award in the 'Acoustic Album' category.

In 2025, Flemons was inducted into the American Banjo Museum Hall of Fame under the Promotion category.

== Discography ==
=== Albums ===
Year	Title	Collaboration	Record label
2007	Dance Tunes Ballads & Blues		CD Baby
2008	American Songster		Music Maker
2012	Buffalo Junction	with Boo Hanks	Music Maker
2014	Prospect Hill		Fat Possum Records / Music Maker
2016	A Selection of Ever Popular Favourites	with Martin Simpson	Fledg'ling Records
2018	Black Cowboys		Smithsonian Folkways
2023	Traveling Wildfire		Smithsonian Folkways

=== Singles ===
Year	A-side	B-side	Record label
2019	"Long Journey Home" & "There's A Brown Skinned Girl Down The Road"	"Po' Black Sheep"	Need to Know

=== Selected other recordings ===
- 2008: Heritage : Carolina Chocolate Drops :4-String Banjo, Clappers, Drums (Snare), Jug, Percussion, Vocals
- 2009: Carolina Chocolate Drops & Joe Thompson :Carolina Chocolate Drops / Joe Thompson :Vocals, Guitar, Jug
- 2009: All the Pretty Horses : The Elftones / Rhiannon Giddens :Banjo, Harmonica
- 2009: Drunken Barrel House Blues : Eden and John's East River String Band :Guest Artist, Dancer, Guitar, Harmonica, Jug, Quills, Vocals
- 2010: Genuine Negro Jig : Carolina Chocolate Drops :4-String Banjo, arranger, composer, Drums (Bass), Foot Percussion, Guitar, Jug, Throat Singing, Vocals
- 2010: Carolina Chocolate Drops/Luminescent Orchestrii (EP) : Carolina Chocolate Drops / Luminescent Orchestrii :4-String Banjo, composer, Handclapping, lyricist, Vocals
- 2011: Be Kind to a Man When He's Down : Eden and John's East River String Band :Guest Artist
- 2012: Voice of Ages : The Chieftains :Arranger, Quills
- 2012: Leaving Eden : Carolina Chocolate Drops :4-String Banjo, arranger, composer, Drums (Bass), Drums (Snare), Guitar, Jug, Quills, Vocals
- 2013: Celebrates 50 Years of Music : Tom Rush :Banjo, composer, Guitar (Acoustic), Harmonica, Pan Pipes, Vocal Harmony, Vocals
- 2014: Haven't Got the Blues (Yet) : Loudon Wainwright III :Harmonica, Jug
- 2015: American Originals : Cincinnati Pops Orchestra / John Morris Russell :Banjo, Harmonia, Percussion, Vocals

== See also ==
- List of Afro-Latinos
