= There Is No Other =

There is No Other

Studio album by Rhiannon Giddens and Francesco Turrisi
- Released: May 3, 2019
- Genre: Folk
- Length: 45:00
- Label: Nonesuch
- Producer: Joe Henry

Rhiannon Giddens chronology
Freedom Highway (2017)	There is No Other (2019)	They're Calling Me Home (2021)

There Is No Other is a collaborative studio album by American singer-songwriter and Carolina Chocolate Drops vocalist Rhiannon Giddens, and Italian jazz musician Francesco Turrisi. The album was produced by Joe Henry and was released on May 3, 2019 by Nonesuch Records.

The track "I'm on My Way" from the album was nominated for the Grammy Award for Best American Roots Performance at the 62nd Annual Grammy Awards.

== Critical reception ==
Professional ratings
Aggregate scores
Source	Rating
AnyDecentMusic?	8.1/10
Metacritic	86/100
Review scores
Source	Rating
AllMusic	4/5 stars
Evening Standard	4/5 stars
Financial Times	4/5 stars
The Guardian	5/5 stars
The Irish Times	5/5 stars
Mojo	4/5 stars
Pitchfork	7.6/10
Rolling Stone	3.5/5 stars
The Times	4/5 stars
Uncut	9/10

According to the review aggregator Metacritic, There is No Other received "universal acclaim" based on a weighted average score of 86 out of 100 from 8 critic scores.

The album, which primarily features Giddens and Turrisi playing together on several instruments, presents a mixture of interpretations to a diverse collection of songs from around the world with two original songs (by Giddens). Since its release, There Is No Other was publicly introduced as an album which is "Tracing the overlooked movement of sounds from Africa and the Arabic world and their influence on European and American music..." and which "...illuminates the universality of music and the commonality of the human experience".

The reviews usually followed these lines of introduction, and mainly praised the unique implementation and the high quality outcome. However, among the writing concerning the album there is an article which stands out for reviewing There Is No Other in a wider musicological context, pointing out its relation to the work of Peter Van der Merwe, especially Van der Merwe's meticulously researched book "Origins of the Popular Style".

The article, written by John Jeremiah Sullivan (as an in-depth examination of the cultural and historical context of Giddens' work as a whole) explains that in his research: "Van der Merwe shows how the “gliding chromaticism” characteristic of the blues spread via Islamic influence into West Africa (in particular the Senegambia region) and, via Spain, into Ireland and the “Celtic fringe.” From those places, these styles and sounds rode farther west, to North America, on slave ships and immigrant ships. In the American South, the Celtic and the African musical traditions met. It was an odd family reunion. Each culture had its own songs, but the idioms understood one another. The result was American music.". Against that background, Sullivan therefore opines that "the album that Giddens and Turrisi have made together functions as a kind of proof of Van der Merwe’s musicological thesis".

"To my ears, the album is the first true Rhiannon Giddens record. Joe Henry produced it, beautifully, by getting as far out of the way as possible. The arrangements are stark. The engineering and the mike placement are direct and intimate. It’s the sonic equivalent of a long still shot in natural light".

== Track listing ==
There Is No Other track listing
No.	Title	Length
1.	"Ten Thousand Voices"	2:57
2.	"Gonna Write Me a Letter"	4:03
3.	"Wayfaring Stranger"	4:47
4.	"There Is No Other"	2:25
5.	"Trees on the Mountains"	5:15
6.	"Pizzica di San Vito"	2:07
7.	"Brown Baby"	5:07
8.	"Briggs' Forró"	4:03
9.	"Little Margaret"	3:03
10.	"Black Swan"	4:17
11.	"I'm on My Way"	2:57
12.	"He Will See You Through"	3:59

== Charts ==
Chart performance for There Is No Other
Chart (2019)	Peak position
Belgian Albums (Ultratop Flanders)	99
Scottish Albums (Official Charts)	23
US Top Tastemaker Albums (Billboard)	24
