= Joan Baez/5 =

Studio album by Joan Baez
- Released: October 1964
- Recorded: 1964
- Genre: Folk
- Length: 41:17
- Label: Vanguard VSD-79160
- Producer: Maynard Solomon

Joan Baez chronology
Joan Baez in Concert, Part 2 (1963)	Joan Baez/5 (1964)	Farewell, Angelina (1965)

Singles from Joan Baez/5
- 1. "There but for Fortune" Released: 1965

Joan Baez/5 is the fifth solo album and third studio album by American folk singer Joan Baez, released in October 1964. It peaked at number 12 on the Billboard 200 chart. The single "There but for Fortune" reached number 50 on the Billboard Hot 100 in the U.S. and became a top-ten single in the UK.

== History ==
Unlike her prior albums, Joan Baez/5 was divided evenly between contemporary work and traditional folk material. "There but for Fortune" was written by Phil Ochs, and she also included Bob Dylan's "It Ain't Me Babe" and Johnny Cash's "I Still Miss Someone", as well as a number of traditional English and American folk songs. Director Spike Lee included Baez' recording of Richard Fariña's "Birmingham Sunday" (about the 16th Street Baptist Church bombing in 1963, in which four young African-American girls lost their lives) in his 1997 documentary 4 Little Girls.

Liner notes were written by Langston Hughes.

The 2002 Vanguard reissue contains two bonus tracks: "Tramp on the Street" and "Long Black Veil".

== Reception ==
Professional ratings
Review scores
Source	Rating
AllMusic	3.5/5 stars

In his AllMusic review, music critic Bruce Eder noted the variety of genres Baez was now exploring. He wrote the album "was where the singer's music experienced its first major blossoming. Having exhausted most of the best traditional songs in her repertory on her four prior LPs, Baez had to broaden the range of her music, and she opened up some promising new territory in the process."

== Track listing ==
1. "There but for Fortune" (Phil Ochs) – 3:11
2. "Stewball" (Ralph Rinzler, Bob Yellin, John Herald) – 2:57
3. "It Ain't Me Babe" (Bob Dylan) – 3:16
4. "The Death of Queen Jane" (Traditional) (Child No. 170) – 3:56
5. "Bachianas Brasileiras No. 5: Aria" (Heitor Villa-Lobos) – 6:32
6. "Go 'Way from My Window" (John Jacob Niles) – 2:10
7. "I Still Miss Someone" (Johnny Cash, Roy Cash Jr.) – 3:10
8. "When You Hear Them Cuckoos Hollerin'" (Traditional) – 2:45
9. "Birmingham Sunday" (Richard Fariña) – 3:58
10. "So We'll Go No More A-Roving" (Richard Dyer-Bennet, Lord Byron) – 1:42
11. "O' Cangaceiro" ("The Bandit") (Alfredo Ricardo do Nascimento) – 2:18
12. "The Unquiet Grave" (Traditional) (Child No. 78) – 4:19

Reissue bonus tracks

1. "Tramp on the Street" (Grady and Hazel Cole) – 3:59
2. "Long Black Veil" (Marijohn Wilkin, Horace Eldred "Danny" Dill) – 2:42

== Personnel ==
- Joan Baez – vocals, guitar
- David Soyer – cello
- Gino Foreman – guitar

== Chart positions ==
Chart (1964)	Peak position
UK Albums (OCC)	3
US Billboard 200	12
