= Freedom Highway (Rhiannon Giddens album) =

Studio album by Rhiannon Giddens
- Released: February 24, 2017
- Genre: Americana, Folk, Old-time
- Length: 49:53
- Label: Nonesuch
- Producer: Dirk Powell

Rhiannon Giddens chronology
Tomorrow Is My Turn (2015)	Freedom Highway (2017)	There Is No Other (2019)

Professional ratings
Aggregate scores
Source	Rating
AnyDecentMusic?	7.7/10
Metacritic	80/100
Review scores
Source	Rating
AllMusic	5/5 stars
The Guardian	4/5 stars
The Independent	3/5 stars
The Irish Times	4/5 stars
Mojo	4/5 stars
The Observer	4/5 stars
Pitchfork	7.6/10
Rolling Stone	4/5 stars
The Times	4/5 stars
Uncut	8/10

Freedom Highway is the second solo studio album of Folk/Americana musician and Carolina Chocolate Drops front woman Rhiannon Giddens. It was released via Nonesuch Records on February 24, 2017. Freedom Highway was nominated for Album of the Year at the 2017 Americana Music Honors & Awards. The title track "Freedom Highway" is a 1965 civil rights protest song written by Roebuck Staples and title track of The Staple Singers' album of the same name.

== Track listing ==
Freedom Highway track listing
No.	Title	Writer(s)	Length
1.	"At the Purchaser's Option"	Rhiannon Giddens/Joey Ryan	4:15
2.	"The Angels Laid Him Away"	Mississippi John Hurt	2:32
3.	"Julie"	Rhiannon Giddens	4:29
4.	"Birmingham Sunday"	Richard Fariña	6:15
5.	"Better Get It Right the First Time"	Rhiannon Giddens/Dirk Powell/Justin Harrington	3:24
6.	"We Could Fly"	Rhiannon Giddens/Dirk Powell	4:52
7.	"Hey Bébé"	Rhiannon Giddens/Dirk Powell	3:19
8.	"Come Love Come"	Rhiannon Giddens	5:19
9.	"The Love We Almost Had"	Rhiannon Giddens/Bhi Bhiman	4:18
10.	"Baby Boy"	Rhiannon Giddens/Lalenja Harrington	4:28
11.	"Following the North Star"	Rhiannon Giddens	1:55
12.	"Freedom Highway"	Roebuck Staples	4:47
Total length:			49:53

== Personnel ==
- Eric Adcock – engineering, Hammond B3, Wurlitzer
- Patrick Bartley – tenor saxophone
- Bhi Bhiman – electric guitar, background vocals (track 12)
- David Bither – executive producer
- Desiree Champagne – Rubboard
- Rowan Corbett – percussion, harmony vocals
- Jamie Dick – drums, percussion
- Rhiannon Giddens – vocals, banjo, handclapping, production
- Lalenja Harrington – harmony vocals
- Jeri Heiden – design
- Alphonso Horne – trumpet
- Hubby Jenkins – banjo, mandolin
- Robert C. Ludwig – mastering
- Leyla McCalla – cello, harmony vocals
- Malcolm Parson – cello
- John Peets – photography
- Amelia Powell – handclapping
- Dirk Powell – electric bass, bells, engineer, fiddle, acoustic guitar, electric guitar, mandolin, mixing, piano, producer, harmony vocals
- Ina Powell – handclapping
- Sophie Powell – handclapping
- Jason Sypher – bass
- Nolan Theis – horn engineer
- Corey Wilcox – trombone

== Charts ==
Chart performance for Freedom Highway
Chart (2017)	Peak position
Australian Albums (ARIA)	49
Belgian Albums (Ultratop Flanders)	60
Dutch Albums (Album Top 100)	88
French Albums (SNEP)	114
Irish Albums (IRMA)	52
Scottish Albums (OCC)	14
Swiss Albums (Schweizer Hitparade)	94
UK Albums (OCC)	39
US Billboard 200	124
US Americana/Folk Albums (Billboard)	8
