= Eden and John's East River String Band =

American country blues duo

Eden and John's East River String Band are an American, New York City-based duo, who play country blues from the 1920s and 1930s. The members are John Heneghan (guitar, mandolin and vocals) and Eden Brower (ukulele and vocals). The duo often have other musicians sit in with them, including Dom Flemons (formerly of Carolina Chocolate Drops), Pat Conte (of the Canebreak Rattlers and Otis Brothers) and Robert Crumb (of the Cheap Suit Serenaders).

== History ==
The East River String Band has released seven studio albums. Their debut, Sweet East River (2006), featured special guests Sophie Crumb (who also provided the cover artwork) on banjolin, Alec Morton from Raging Slab on bass, Jim Stout on banjo and Sam Hopkins on bottleneck guitar. The band's second album, Some Cold Rainy Day (2008), was chosen by David Fricke as one of his "picks" of the month in the November 2008 issue of Rolling Stone. It featured cover artwork by Crumb (as did their three subsequent albums) and special guest pianist Terry Waldo, known for his work with Leon Redbone and Woody Allen.

Their third album, Drunken Barrel House Blues (2009), featured special guests Flemons on guitar and quills, Conte on fiddle, and Eli Smith on banjo. Their fourth album, Be Kind to a Man When He's Down (2011), boasted guest players Crumb on mandolin, Flemons on guitar, and Conte on fiddle, banjo, harmonica and vocals. Their fifth album, Take a Look at That Baby (2013), included guests Ernesto Gomez, Joe Bellulovich, Jackson Lynch and Blind Uncle Otis in addition to Crumb, Flemons and Conte. Their sixth album was named Coney Island Baby (2019).

Their seventh and latest album, Goodbye Cruel World (2022), saw Crumb play, sing and again undertake the cover art.

== Discography ==
Date	Title
2006	Sweet East River
2008	Some Cold Rainy Day
2009	Drunken Barrel House Blues
2011	Be Kind to a Man When He's Down
2013	Take a Look at That Baby
2019	Coney Island Baby
2020	Live at the Brooklyn Folk Festival, Vol. 1 (live album)
2022	Goodbye Cruel World

== See also ==
- Country blues
- Delta blues
