= Birmingham Sunday =

Song by Richard Fariña

"Birmingham Sunday" is a song written by Richard Fariña and performed by both Fariña and also by his sister-in-law Joan Baez . The subject matter is the bombing of the 16th Street Baptist Church on September 15, 1963, by members of the Ku Klux Klan that killed four girls and injured 22 others. The girls were Addie Mae Collins (14), Denise McNair (11), Carole Robertson (14), and Cynthia Wesley (14). The melody of the song comes from a traditional Scottish ballad named I Once Loved a Lass.

Fariña's version was released on the Elektra LP Singer Songwriter Project in 1965, while Baez's version was released on her 1964 Vanguard album Joan Baez/5, and was used as the theme song of the 1997 Spike Lee documentary about the bombing, 4 Little Girls.

The song was covered by Rhiannon Giddens on her 2017 album Freedom Highway, and by Tom Paxton and Anne Hills on Under American Skies.

== See also ==
- Civil rights movement in popular culture
