= Carolina Chocolate Drops/Luminescent Orchestrii =

EP by Carolina Chocolate Drops and Luminescent Orchestrii
- Released: January 25, 2011
- Genre: Bluegrass
- Length: 18:24
- Label: Nonesuch Records

Carolina Chocolate Drops/Luminescent Orchestrii is a collaborative EP by Durham, North Carolina–based string band Carolina Chocolate Drops and experimental music band Luminescent Orchestrii. It was released on January 25, 2011 on Nonesuch Records.

== Critical reception ==
Professional ratings
Review scores
Source	Rating
AllMusic	3.5/5 stars
No Depression	(very favorable)
PopMatters	8/10 stars
Robert Christgau	A

Robert Christgau gave the EP an A grade and wrote that "All four songs are quick, sexy, and a trifle nasty." AllMusic's Steve Leggett gave the EP 3.5 out of 5 stars, and described it as "hardly some Frankenstein creation, but instead a fluid, energetic, and yes, even traditional-sounding set of gems that proves one can pull two different directions together into one without losing the strengths and passion of either."

== Track listing ==
1. "Short Dress Gal" (Sam Morgan, Barry Martyn, additional lyrics by Dom Flemons, Rhiannon Giddens, Adam Matta and Sxip Shirey) 3:22
2. "Escoutas (Diga Diga Diga)" (lyrics traditional, music by Sarah Alden, Sxip Shirey, and Luminescent Orchestrii) 4:39
3. "Hit ’Em Up Style" (Dallas Austin) 4:52
4. "Knockin’" (Rima Fand, Sxip Shirey) 5:27
