= Leaving Eden (Carolina Chocolate Drops album) =

Studio album by Carolina Chocolate Drops
- Released: February 28, 2012
- Recorded: March–July 2011 at Buddy Miller's Home
- Genre: Folk, blues, country, bluegrass
- Label: Nonesuch
- Producer: Buddy Miller

Carolina Chocolate Drops chronology
Genuine Negro Jig (2010)	Leaving Eden (2012)

Leaving Eden is the fourth studio album by the Carolina Chocolate Drops.

== Background ==
A music video for "Country Girl" was released in May 2012.

== Track listing ==
1. "Riro's House" (Traditional; arr. Dom Flemons, Rhiannon Giddens) – 2:02
2. "Kerr's Negro Jig" (Traditional; arr. Giddens) – 1:09
3. "Ruby, Are You Mad at Your Man?" (Cousin Emmy) – 3:46
4. "Boodle-De-Bum-Bum" (Ben Curry/Traditional; arr. Flemons) – 4:03
5. "Country Girl" (Giddens, Lalenja Harrington, Adam Matta) – 3:22
6. "Run Mountain" (J. E. Mainer) – 2:01
7. "Leaving Eden" (Laurelyn Dossett) – 4:36
8. "Read 'Em John" (Traditional; arr. Flemons) – 1:54
9. "Mahalla" (Hannes Coetzee) – 1:54
10. "West End Blues" (Etta Baker, Giddens) – 3:02
11. "Po’ Black Sheep" (Traditional; arr. Flemons) – 3:21
12. "I Truly Understand That You Love Another Man" (George Roarke) – 2:34
13. "No Man’s Mama" (Lew Pollack, Jack Yellen) – 4:00
14. "Briggs’ Corn Shucking Jig / Camptown Hornpipe" (Traditional; arr. Giddens) – 2:54
15. "Pretty Bird" (Hazel Dickens) – 4:04

=== Bonus track ===
1. "You Be Illin'" (Joseph Simmons, Darryl McDaniels, Raymond White) – 3:17

== Personnel ==
- Dom Flemons – snare drum, bass drum, bones, 4-string banjo, jug, quills, guitar
- Rhiannon Giddens – fiddle, 5-strings gourd banjo, 5 string banjo, 5-string cello banjo
- Hubby Jenkins – 5-string banjo, mandolin, guitar, bones
- Adam Matta – beatbox, tambourine
- Leyla McCalla – cello

== Charts ==
=== Weekly ===
Chart (2012)	Peak position
Belgian Heatseekers Albums (Ultratop Flanders)	10
UK Albums (OCC)	115
US Billboard 200	123
US Americana/Folk Albums (Billboard)	6
US Heatseekers Albums (Billboard)	2
US Top Bluegrass Albums (Billboard)	1

=== Year-end ===
Chart (2012)	Position
US Folk Albums (Billboard)	38
US Top Bluegrass Albums (Billboard)	8

Chart (2013)	Position
US Top Bluegrass Albums (Billboard)	15
