= They're Calling Me Home =

Studio album by Rhiannon Giddens and Francesco Turrisi
- Released: April 9, 2021
- Studio: Hellfire, near Dublin, Ireland,
- Genre: Folk
- Length: 45:49
- Label: Nonesuch
- Producer: Rhiannon Giddens, Francesco Turrisi

Rhiannon Giddens chronology
There Is No Other (2019)	They're Calling Me Home (2021)	You're the One (2023)

They're Calling Me Home is the second collaborative album by American singer-songwriter Rhiannon Giddens and Italian composer Francesco Turrisi, released through Nonesuch Records on April 9, 2021. It received acclaim from critics and won the Grammy Award for Best Folk Album at the 2022 Grammy Awards.

== Critical reception ==
Professional ratings
Aggregate scores
Source	Rating
Metacritic	89/100
Review scores
Source	Rating
AllMusic	4/5 stars
The Guardian	5/5 stars
PopMatters	8/10
Under the Radar	8/10 stars

They're Calling Me Home received a score of 89 out of 100 on review aggregator Metacritic based on seven critics' reviews, indicating "universal acclaim". Uncut described it as an "extended mediation on the expat experience, with yearningly hymnal renditions", while Mojo called "the pair's musical chemistry a potent one". Jim Hynes of Glide Magazine wrote that "while this work may not be as riveting and stunning as its predecessor, due mostly to the familiarity of many of the tunes, that dynamic cuts both ways because there are few interpreters as adept as Giddens for traditional fare. Also, the remarkable musical chemistry between the duo just continues to grow".

Stephen Thomas Erlewine of AllMusic described the album as "soulful, searching" as well as "homesickness [... ,] meditations on mortality and the meaning of home" with "traditional melodies [...] revived alongside new compositions that feel ancient, and folk traditions from America and Europe are blended so they're difficult to parse". Jude Rogers of The Guardian called it "a big, beautiful album, a showcase for direct, punchy emotions and Giddens' vocal versatility" and felt that its "dazzling examples" of tracks such as the Italian lullaby "Nenna Nenna", the title track and "Niwel Goes to Town", will "live on".

Reviewing the album for PopMatters, Brice Ezell characterized the album as "a set of new and traditional songs exemplifying [Giddens's] rootedness in music history", one that also "memorializes and breathes new life into a set of songs that feel familiar and entirely unexpected". Ben Jardine of Under the Radar summarized it as "folk songs, lullabies, and spirituals, all of which have been influential to Giddens and Turrisi. Each track is an emotional glimpse of their musical DNA: reworked [... and] refreshed with the virtuosic pulse of two of the world's finest maestros".

== Track listing ==
They're Calling Me Home track listing
No.	Title	Length
1.	"Calling Me Home"	3:49
2.	"Avalon"	3:54
3.	"Si Dolce è'l Tormento"	3:56
4.	"I Shall Not Be Moved"	4:58
5.	"Black as Crow"	5:22
6.	"O Death"	3:13
7.	"Niwel Goes to Town"	3:22
8.	"When I Was in My Prime"	4:06
9.	"Waterbound"	3:57
10.	"Bully for You"	2:40
11.	"Nenna Nenna"	2:37
12.	"Amazing Grace"	3:55
Total length:		45:49

== Charts ==
Chart performance for They're Calling Me Home
Chart (2021)	Peak position
Belgian Albums (Ultratop Flanders)	143
Scottish Albums (OCC)	11
UK Album Downloads (OCC)	23
US Americana/Folk Albums (Billboard)	19
