= You're the One (Rhiannon Giddens album) =

Studio album by Rhiannon Giddens
- Released: August 19, 2023
- Genre: Americana
- Length: 41:27
- Label: Nonesuch
- Producer: Jack Splash

Rhiannon Giddens chronology
They're Calling Me Home (2021)	You're the One (2023)

You're the One is the third solo studio album by American singer-songwriter Rhiannon Giddens, released through Nonesuch Records on August 18, 2023. The album was produced by Jack Splash and contains only original compositions, with a guest appearance by Jason Isbell. It received generally positive reviews from critics.

== Background ==
Giddens expressed that she hoped listeners would "just hear American music. Blues, jazz, Cajun, country, gospel, and rock—it's all there. [...] They're fun songs, and I wanted them to have as much of a chance as they could to reach people who might dig them but don't know anything about what I do".

"Wrong Kind of Right" was previously recorded by Giddens for the fifth season of the country music drama series Nashville, in which she played Hallie Jordan.

== Critical reception ==
Professional ratings
Aggregate scores
Source	Rating
Metacritic	77/100
Review scores
Source	Rating
All About Jazz	4/5 stars
The Irish Times	4/5 stars
Mojo	3/5 stars
Paste	8.0/10
Pitchfork	6.8/10
Uncut	7/10

You're the One received a score of 77 out of 100 on review aggregator Metacritic based on nine critics' reviews, indicating "generally favorable" reception. Mojo wrote that its "tunes about finding love, rejecting losers, and criticising corrupt systems are a patchwork of assorted American pops", and Uncut felt that "the countrier [Giddens] keeps it, the better". David Browne of Rolling Stone wrote that the album "occasionally suffers from its lofty goals [...] but on her most outward-looking record, Giddens melds the past and present, writing a bold new future for herself in the process". Glide Magazine's Jim Hynes stated that the album "embraces pop, rock, blues, jazz, and gospel" and is "the crowning achievement of her three recordings so far", leaving listeners "wondering if there is anything she can't do".

Katharine Cartwright of All About Jazz found that the album "focuses on Giddens as a songwriter, in a variety of idioms" and is "yet another extraordinary offering from a great American musician whose work is consistently and superbly 'beyond category,' to quote Duke Ellington". Amanda Wicks, reviewing the album for Pitchfork, wrote that Giddens "seems more interested in playing a variety of parts than fully inhabiting any one. Each song feels like a costume she dons for the duration of the track" and that she also "seeks livelier rhythms and vocal styles infused with jazz, country, and zydeco". Paste's Laura Dzubay opined that the album "finds pure emotion unfolding at the forefront. It's a deeply fun album that beckons the listener's attention immediately" and that "Giddens touches nothing carelessly, and it's true even—maybe especially—in the songs on You're the One".

== Track listing ==
You're the One track listing
No.	Title	Length
1.	"Too Little, Too Late, Too Bad"	3:44
2.	"You're the One"	3:25
3.	"Yet to Be" (featuring Jason Isbell)	3:39
4.	"Wrong Kind of Right"	4:39
5.	"Another Wasted Life"	4:47
6.	"You Louisiana Man"	4:06
7.	"If You Don't Know How Sweet It Is"	3:01
8.	"Hen in the Foxhouse"	3:47
9.	"Who Are You Dreaming Of"	3:25
10.	"You Put the Sugar in My Bowl"	2:58
11.	"Way Over Yonder"	3:11
12.	"Good Ol' Cider"	0:45
Total length:		41:27

== Charts ==
Chart performance for You're the One
Chart (2023)	Peak position
Belgian Albums (Ultratop Flanders)	139
Scottish Albums (Official Charts)	12
UK Album Downloads (Official Charts)	33
US Americana/Folk Albums (Billboard)	16
US Top Album Sales (Billboard)	26
