= Genuine Negro Jig =

Studio album by Carolina Chocolate Drops
- Released: February 16, 2010
- Recorded: January 9–16, 2009
- Genres: Blues, old-time, bluegrass
- Length: 38:30
- Label: Nonesuch
- Producer: Joe Henry

Carolina Chocolate Drops chronology
Joe Thompson and the Carolina Chocolate Drops (2009)	Genuine Negro Jig (2010)	Leaving Eden (2012)

Professional ratings
Review scores
Source	Rating
Allmusic	3.5/5 stars
Paste magazine	(7.8/10)
Engine 145	4.5/5 stars
The Guardian (UK)	4/5 stars

Genuine Negro Jig is the third studio album of the Carolina Chocolate Drops, an African-American string band. Its label debut was released on February 16, 2010, while its vinyl version, which included the album on 140-gram vinyl and CD, was released on July 13. This is the first album the band has recorded for Nonesuch Records. It was highly successful, reaching the top ten on the Billboard Folk chart and the top of the Bluegrass chart. It was also the last CCD recording to include collaborator and Sankofa Strings co-founder, Sule Greg Wilson.

Like most of the Carolina Chocolate Drops' work, the album, a mixture of traditional folk songs, early 20th "Race" music, and recent pieces, is part of the Chocolate Drops' effort to celebrate the string band music of the Piedmont region of North and South Carolina, and the influence of African-Americans on this music. On NPR, band member Rhiannon Giddens pointed out that "it seems that two things get left out of the history books. One, that there was string band music in the Piedmont, period. (And that) black folk were such a huge part of string tradition." Although the music the Chocolate Drops play is quite eclectic, the band members claim that early 20th-century African American string bands also drew from a wide range of genres in their musical repertoire. In describing the music, Giddens discusses how she was inspired but not bound by the genres in which she works—"Tradition is a guide, not a jailer. We play in an older tradition but we are modern musicians."

Genuine Negro Jig was well received by critics. Blogcritics writes that "our ears are all the better for it" and is "hoping that this record will not only put the Carolina Chocolate Drops on the map, but will also draw new listeners in to the genres of old country and blues." Engine 145 describes Genuine Negro Jig as "an album of feistily complex, yet endearingly soulful songs that have ages of history behind them and a bright future as well." Paste magazine calls the Chocolate Drops "the genuine article" whose "enthusiasm for the tradition is obvious." The Guardian writes that the album is "well worth checking out."

The album won a 2010 Grammy Award in the best traditional folk album category, and was number 9 in fRoots magazine's top 10 albums of the year.

== Track listing ==
1. "Peace Behind the Bridge" (Etta Baker) – 2:34
2. "Trouble in Your Mind" (Traditional) – 2:55
3. "Your Baby Ain't Sweet Like Mine" (Charlie Jackson, Dom Flemons) – 3:00
4. "Hit 'Em Up Style" (Dallas Austin) – 3:56
5. "Cornbread and Butterbeans" (Traditional) – 3:10
6. "Snowden's Jig" (Genuine Negro Jig) (Traditional) – 3:53
7. "Why Don't You Do Right?" (Kansas Joe McCoy) – 3:36
8. "Cindy Gal" (Traditional) – 2:28
9. "Kissin' and Cussin'" (Justin Robinson) – 3:21
10. "Sandy Boys" (Traditional) – 2:25
11. "Reynadine" (Traditional) – 2:37
12. "Trampled Rose" (Kathleen Brennan, Tom Waits) – 4:36
13. Bonus Download: "Your Baby Ain't Sweet Like Mine" (live) (Charlie Jackson, Dom Flemons) – 3:38
14. Bonus Download: "Cornbread and Butterbeans" (live) (Traditional) – 3:57
15. Bonus Download: "Georgia Buck" (live) (Traditional) – 3:03
16. Bonus Download: "Hit 'Em Up Style" (live) (Dallas Austin) – 5:28
17. Bonus Download: "Snowden's Jig" (Genuine Negro Jig) (live) (Traditional) – 4:07
18. Bonus Download: "Memphis Shakedown" (live) (Traditional) – 3:40
19. Bonus Download: "Trouble in Your Mind" (live) (Traditional) – 3:06

== Personnel ==
The Carolina Chocolate Drops

- Dom Flemons - vocals (2, 3, 8, 10, 12), throat singing (2); bones (1, 5, 6, 8), four-string banjo (3, 4, 12), jug (3, 5, 12), bass drum (9), "foot" percussion (12)
- Rhiannon Giddens - vocals (2–7, 10, 11); five-string banjo (1, 2, 5, 8–10), kazoo (3), fiddle (4, 6)
- Justin Robinson - vocals (2, 3, 5, 9, 10), beatbox (4); fiddle (1, 2, 5, 8, 10, 12), handclaps and foot percussion (6), autoharp (9)
- Súle Greg Wilson - tambourine (3, 4), frame drum set (4), computer hard drive "triangle" (6), "leg" percussion (7), percussion (10)
