= Aria Code =

New York City-based opera podcast

Aria Code is a podcast produced by WQXR in collaboration with Metropolitan Opera and hosted by Rhiannon Giddens. The show debuted in 2018 and has released four seasons of episodes.

== Background ==
The show is produced by WQXR in collaboration with Metropolitan Opera and hosted by Rhiannon Giddens. Merrin Lazyan came up with the idea for the show in 2017 and was the co-creator and lead producer for the show. In each episode, Giddons introduces an aria and discusses it with a few guests before playing the full aria from the Metropolitan Opera's archive. A few episodes discuss the misogyny embedded in the writing of many operas. The second season began discussing the arias in relation to modern life.

The first season was 10 episodes long with each episode about 30 minutes in length. The first season debuted December 4, 2018, and released episodes every Tuesday until February 6, 2019. The second season debuted on November 13, 2019, and released episodes every Wednesday until January 29, 2020. The third season debuted on March 10, 2021, and released episodes on a biweekly basis through November. The fourth season debuted on September 28, 2023, and released 8 episodes through January 2024.

== See also ==
- List of music podcasts
