= L'Amour, c'est comme un jour =

"L'amour, c'est comme un jour" (translation: Love is like a day) is a 1962 song by Charles Aznavour written by Aznavour, with lyrics by Yves Stéphane. An Italian version "L'amore È Come Un Giorno", with lyrics by Sergio Bardotti, followed in 1964. An English version "Tomorrow is My Turn", with lyrics by Marcel Stellman, was recorded by Nina Simone on the 1965 album I Put a Spell on You. Aznavour recorded the song multiple times, including as a duet with Sting for Aznavour's 2009 album Duos. The English version became the title song for Rhiannon Giddens 2015 solo debut album Tomorrow Is My Turn.
