= Tomorrow Is My Turn (album) =

Studio album by Rhiannon Giddens
- Released: February 10, 2015
- Length: 43:43
- Label: Nonesuch
- Producer: T Bone Burnett

Rhiannon Giddens chronology
Tomorrow Is My Turn (2015)	Freedom Highway (2017)

Tomorrow Is My Turn is the first studio album by Rhiannon Giddens. Nonesuch Records released the album on February 10, 2015. She worked with T Bone Burnett in the production of this album. The album was nominated for Best Folk Album at the 58th Annual Grammy Awards. The title song is Nina Simone's English version of Charles Aznavour's 1962 hit "L'Amour, c'est comme un jour".

== Critical reception ==
Professional ratings
Aggregate scores
Source	Rating
Metacritic	84/100
Review scores
Source	Rating
AllMusic	4/5 stars
American Songwriter	4/5 stars
Blurt	4/5 stars
The Daily Telegraph	5/5 stars
The Observer	4/5 stars
PopMatters	9/10 stars
Rolling Stone	3.5/5 stars
Spin	8/10 stars

Awarding the album four stars at AllMusic, Stephen Thomas Erlewine writes, "Her easy, welcoming touch is a balm every time Tomorrow Is My Turn is played, but it's upon successive spins that the intricacies of Giddens' construction – not to mention her subtle political messages – begin to take hold." Hal Horowitz, giving the album four stars from American Songwriter, states, "The combination of Burnett’s characteristically genuine, acoustic based production, Giddens’ sumptuous voice and a conceptual set list that never feels musty, yields a wonderful album whose restrained pleasures reveal themselves gradually over repeated playings." Rating the album five stars for The Daily Telegraph, Marcus Chilton says, "The result is the gorgeous Tomorrow is My Turn, which shows off the full singing range and power of the frontwoman for innovative string-band trio the Carolina Chocolate Drops." Jonathan Bernstein, granting the album a three and a half star review at Rolling Stone, describes, "Giddens is having a solo coming-out party, displaying her classical vocal training and ability to reanimate traditional music in her own nuanced image."

Putting an eight out of ten rating upon the album at Spin, Anthony Easton expresses, "Tomorrow Is My Turn continues that task with her clarion call gracing a smart collection of classic folk and country standbys, rather than an act of anthropology for the sake of it. Turn is a haunting, often painfully beautiful example of how songs that may seem dead and buried can sublimely rise from the grave." George de Stefano, signaling in a nine out of ten review for PopMatters, replies, "Everything works on Tomorrow Is My Turn, an album that heralds the arrival of a major American artist." Assigning the album four stars at The Observer, Neil Spencer recognizes, "Co-founder of the revivalist Carolina Chocolate Drops, Giddens explores the frontiers of Americana on a solo debut of phenomenal vocal power, effortlessly jumping between gospel holler, tender folk song and lachrymose country ballad." Lee Zimmerman, indicating in a four star review by Blurt, responds, "Giddens emulates her forebears with reverence and assurance,...Producer T Bone Burnett steers the proceedings accordingly, imbuing a sepia-tinted feel that melds well with Giddens’ stately, assertive delivery."

=== Accolades ===
The popularity of the album in the UK caused Giddens to become the first non-British winner of the "Folk Singer of the Year" award at the BBC Radio 2 Folk Awards.

Accolades for Tomorrow Is My Turn
Publication	Rank	List
PopMatters	47	The 80 Best Albums of 2015
Rolling Stone	46	50 Best Albums of 2015
NPR	—	NPR Music's 50 Favorite Albums of 2015

== Track listing ==
Tomorrow Is My Turn track listing
No.	Title	Writer(s)	Length
1.	"Last Kind Words"	Geeshie Wiley	4:13
2.	"Don't Let It Trouble Your Mind"	Dolly Parton	3:39
3.	"Waterboy"	Jacques Wolfe	3:45
4.	"She's Got You"	Hank Cochran	4:17
5.	"Up Above My Head"	Sister Rosetta Tharpe	3:09
6.	"Tomorrow Is My Turn"	Charles Aznavour, Marcel Stellman, Yves Stephane	4:37
7.	"Black Is the Color"	Traditional	3:45
8.	"Round About the Mountain"	Traditional	3:30
9.	"Shake Sugaree"	Elizabeth Cotten	4:24
10.	"O Love Is Teasin'"	Traditional	4:32
11.	"Angel City"	Giddens	3:52
Total length:			43:43

== Personnel ==
- Jack Ashford – tambourine
- Jon Batiste – Melodica
- Jay Bellerose – drums, percussion
- Mike Bub – acoustic bass
- T Bone Burnett – acoustic guitar, producer
- Keefus Ciancia – keyboards
- Mike Compton – mandolin
- Dennis Crouch – bass, acoustic bass
- Richard Dodd – cello
- Rhiannon Giddens – arranger, vocals
- Hubby Jenkins – banjo, acoustic guitar
- Paul Kowert – acoustic bass
- Darrell Leonard – trumpet
- Colin Linden – electric guitar
- Lester Lovitt – trumpet
- Adam Matta – beatbox
- Tom Peterson – baritone sax
- Noam Pikelny – banjo
- Joe Sublett – tenor sax
- Jim Thompson – tenor sax
- Tata Vega – background vocals
- Gabe Witcher – fiddle, acoustic guitar, horn arrangements, string arrangements, viola, violin
- Jean Witherspoon – background vocals

== Chart performance ==
Chart performance for Tomorrow Is My Turn
Chart (2015–2016)	Peak position
Dutch Albums (Album Top 100)	52
UK Albums (OCC)	28
UK Americana Albums (OCC)	5
US Billboard 200	53
US Folk Albums (Billboard)	1
US Top Rock Albums (Billboard)	9
US Top Tastemaker Albums (Billboard)	10
