= Richard Fariña =

American folksinger, songwriter, poet and novelist (1937–1966)

- Fariña
- Born: Richard George Fariña; March 8, 1937; New York City, U.S.
- Died: April 30, 1966 (aged 29); Carmel, California, U.S.
- Occupations: Author; composer; singer
- Spouses: Carolyn Hester (m. 1960; div. 1962); Mimi Baez (m. 1963)
- Writing career
- Genre: Folk
- Notable work: Been Down So Long It Looks Like Up to Me
- Movement: Counterculture

Richard George Fariña (Spanish: [faˈɾiɲa]; March 8, 1937 – April 30, 1966) was an American folksinger, songwriter, poet and novelist.

== Early years and education ==
Fariña was born in Brooklyn, New York, United States, the son of an Irish mother, Theresa Crozier, and a Cuban father of Galician origin, also named Richard Fariña. He grew up in the Flatbush neighborhood of Brooklyn and attended Brooklyn Technical High School. He earned an academic scholarship to Cornell University, starting out as an engineering major, but later switching to English. While at Cornell he published short stories for local literary magazines and for national periodicals, including Transatlantic Review and Mademoiselle. Fariña became good friends with Thomas Pynchon, David Shetzline, and Peter Yarrow while at Cornell. He was suspended for alleged participation in a student demonstration against campus regulations, and although he later resumed his status as a student, he dropped out in 1959, just before graduation.

== Ascent on Greenwich Village folk scene ==
On returning to Manhattan, Fariña became a regular patron of the White Horse Tavern, the well-known Greenwich Village tavern frequented by poets, artists, and folksingers, where he befriended Tommy Makem. It was there that he met Carolyn Hester, a successful folk singer. They married 18 days later. Fariña appointed himself Hester's agent; they toured worldwide while Fariña worked on his novel and Carolyn performed gigs. Fariña was present when Hester recorded her third album at Columbia studios during September 1961, where a then-little-known Bob Dylan played the harmonica on several tracks. Fariña became a good friend of Dylan; their friendship is a major topic of David Hajdu's book, Positively 4th Street: The Lives and Times of Joan Baez, Bob Dylan, Mimi Baez Fariña, and Richard Fariña. Fariña and Hester recorded an EP with Rory and Alex McEwen, (later Fariña and Eric Von Schmidt recorded a 1963 album as a duo, with Dylan as a guest).

Fariña then travelled to Europe, where he met Mimi Baez, the teenage sister of Joan Baez, in the spring of 1962. Hester divorced Fariña soon thereafter, and Fariña married 17-year-old Mimi in April 1963. Thomas Pynchon was the best man. They moved to a small cabin in Carmel, California, where they composed songs with a guitar and Appalachian dulcimer. They debuted their act as "Richard & Mimi Fariña" at the Big Sur Folk Festival in 1964 and signed a contract with Vanguard Records. They recorded their first album, Celebrations for a Grey Day (released under the name Mimi & Richard Fariña), in 1965, with the help of Bruce Langhorne, who had previously played for Dylan. During Richard's life, the couple released only one other album, Reflections in a Crystal Wind, also in 1965. A third album, Memories, was issued in 1968, after his death. In early 1966, Richard and Mimi Fariña appeared as the sole guests on Episode 16 of Pete Seeger's short-lived UHF television program Rainbow Quest.

Fariña, like Dylan and others of this time, was considered a protest singer, and several of his songs are overtly political. Several critics have considered Fariña to be a major folk music talent of the 1960s. ("If Richard had survived that motorcycle accident, he would have easily given Dylan a run for his money," according to Ed Ward.)

His best-known songs are "Pack Up Your Sorrows" and "Birmingham Sunday", the latter of which was recorded by Joan Baez and became better known after it became the theme song for Spike Lee's film 4 Little Girls, a documentary about the 16th Street Baptist Church bombing in Birmingham, Alabama in 1963. "Birmingham Sunday" was also recorded by Rhiannon Giddens in 2017, on her album Freedom Highway. He also wrote "The Quiet Joys of Brotherhood", which was recorded by Sandy Denny.

At the time of his death, Fariña was producing an album for his sister-in-law Joan Baez. She ultimately decided not to release the album. Two of the songs were included on Fariña's posthumous album, and another, a cover version of Fariña's "Pack Up Your Sorrows", co-written by Fariña with the third Baez sister, Pauline Marden, was released as a single in 1966; it has been included in a number of Baez's compilation albums.

== Been Down So Long It Looks Like Up to Me ==
Fariña is known for his novel Been Down So Long It Looks Like Up to Me, originally published by Random House in 1966. The title comes from the Furry Lewis song "I Will Turn Your Money Green" ("I been down so long/It seem like up to me"). The novel, based largely on his college experiences and travels, is a picaresque novel, set in 1958 in the American West, in Cuba during the Cuban Revolution, and mostly at Cornell University (called Mentor University in the novel). The protagonist is Gnossos Pappadopoulis, who enjoys dope, paregoric, feta cheese, Red Cap ale and retsina; attacks authority figures with anarchic glee; and lusts after the girl in the green knee-socks while searching for the right karma. The book became a cult classic among fans of the 1960s and counterculture literature. Thomas Pynchon, who later dedicated his book Gravity's Rainbow (1973) to Fariña, described Fariña's novel as "coming on like the Hallelujah Chorus done by 200 kazoo players with perfect pitch... hilarious, chilling, sexy, profound, maniacal, beautiful, and outrageous all at the same time."

== Death ==
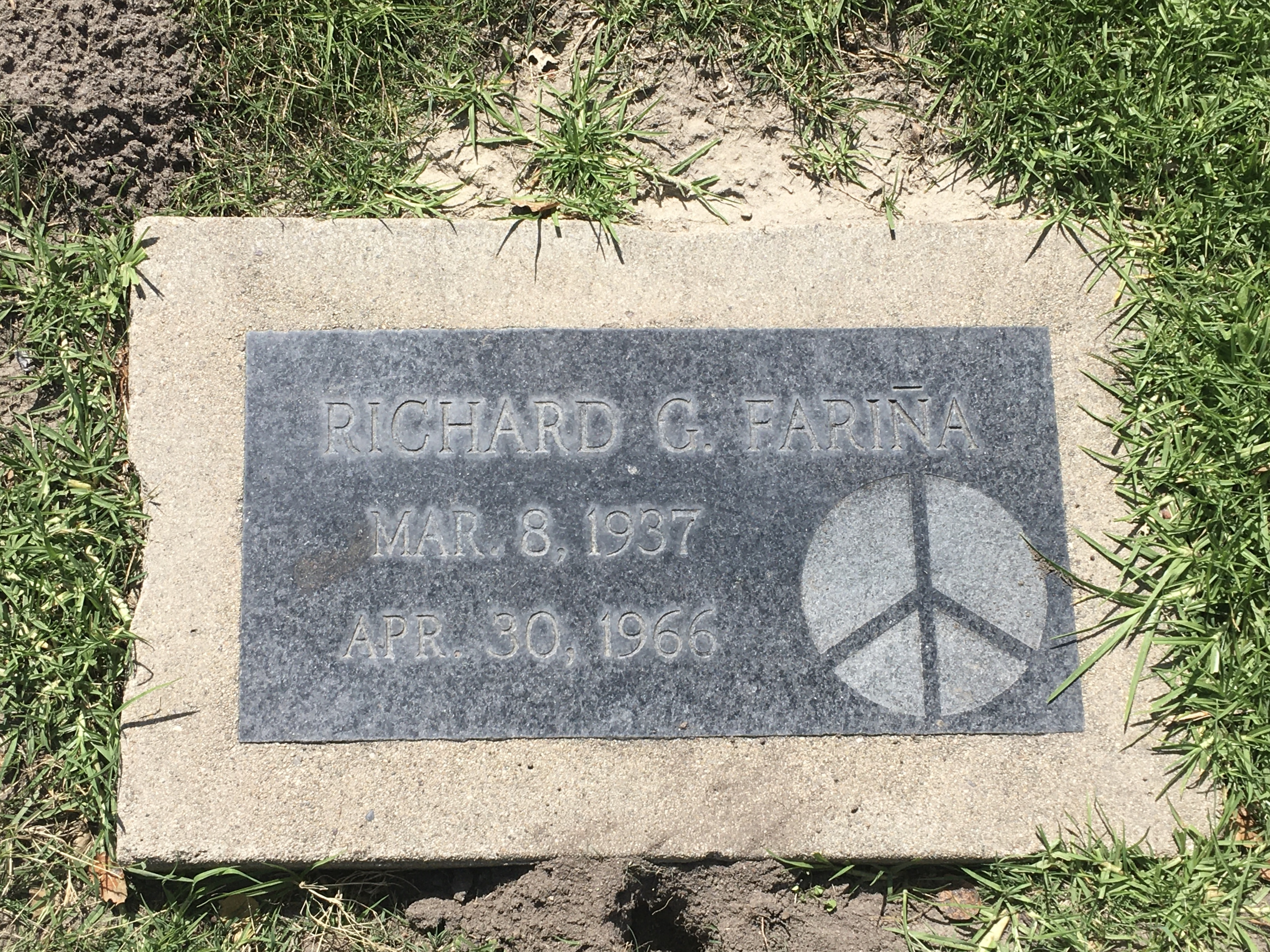
Fariña's tombstone

On April 30, 1966, two days after the publication of his novel, Fariña attended a book-signing ceremony at a Carmel Valley Village bookstore, the Thunderbird. Later that day, while at a party to celebrate his wife Mimi's twenty-first birthday, Fariña saw a guest with a motorcycle, who later gave Fariña a ride up Carmel Valley Road, heading east toward the rural Cachagua area of Carmel Valley.

At an S-turn the driver lost control. The motorcycle tipped over on the right side of the road, came back to the other side, and tore through a barbed wire fence into a field where a small vineyard now exists. The driver survived, but Fariña was killed instantly. According to Pynchon's preface to Been Down..., the police said the motorcycle must have been traveling at 90 miles per hour (140 km/h), even though "a prudent speed" would have been 30 miles per hour (48 km/h).

Fariña was buried in a simple grave, its marker emblazoned with a peace sign, at Monterey City Cemetery in Monterey, California.

== Discography ==
- Rory and Alex McEwen, Carolyne and Dick Fariña – Four For Fun, EP (Waverley, 1963)
- Dick Fariña & Eric Von Schmidt – Dick Fariña & Eric Von Schmidt (Folklore, 1963) [includes Bob Dylan as guest on 6 tracks]
- Mimi & Richard Fariña – Celebrations For A Grey Day (Vanguard, 1965)
- Richard & Mimi Fariña – Reflections In A Crystal Wind (Vanguard, 1965)
- Richard & Mimi Fariña – Memories (Vanguard, 1968)

== Legacy ==
- On April 27, 1968, Fairport Convention recorded a live version of "Reno Nevada" for French TV programme Bouton Rouge, featuring vocals by Judy Dyble and Iain Matthews. They recorded the song for a BBC session later in the same year, this time with Dyble's replacement in the band Sandy Denny, subsequently included on the album Heyday. Denny also recorded "The Quiet Joys of Brotherhood" for her 1972 album Sandy. Matthews later recorded "Reno Nevada" and "Morgan the Pirate" for his album If You Saw Thro' My Eyes as well as "House of Un-American Blues Activity Dream" for his album Tigers Will Survive, and other Fariña compositions appeared on subsequent Matthews solo albums and on recordings by Matthews' band Plainsong.
- South Carolina-based rock band A Fragile Tomorrow covered a version of Mimi and Richard's song "One Way Ticket" on their 2015 release Make Me Over. Their version is a collaboration with Joan Baez and Indigo Girls. Brothers Dom Kelly, Sean Kelly, and Brendan Kelly of A Fragile Tomorrow are third cousins of Richard and had wanted to cover his music with Baez.
- Joan Baez's song "Sweet Sir Galahad" commemorates Fariña's death, the grieving of his widow Mimi, and Mimi's eventual recovery and remarriage.
- Thomas Pynchon's 1973 novel Gravity's Rainbow is dedicated to Richard Fariña.
- Richard Barone's 2016 album Sorrows & Promises: Greenwich Village in the 1960s contains Barone's interpretation of Fariña's "Pack Up Your Sorrows" performed as a duet with Nellie McKay.
- In Richard Linklater's movie Slacker, Fariña is described as a "young truth with balls," who could "think and fuck at the same time" (along with Richard Feynman, Italo Balbo, et al.), which is why "history buried him."
- On Jimmy Buffett's 1973 album A White Sport Coat and A Pink Crustacean, the single "Death of an Unpopular Poet" is claimed by Buffett to have been inspired by Fariña and fellow poet Kenneth Patchen.

== Bibliography ==
- Been Down So Long It Looks Like Up to Me (1966)
- Long Time Coming and a Long Time Gone (1969)
