= David Shetzline =

American author (born 1934)

- Born: David W. Shetzline; 1934 (age 91–92) Yonkers, New York, U.S.
- Occupation: Author
- Education: Cornell University (BA); University of Oregon
- Spouse: Mary F. Beal

David W. Shetzline (born 1934, Yonkers, New York) is an American author residing in Marcola, Oregon.

Shetzline received his Bachelor of Arts from Cornell University in 1956 and his master's in literature from the University of Oregon in 1997. His dissertation was entitled "Quantum Dialogues: The Rhetorics of Religion and the Metaphors of Postmodern Science" (English, 2000). He served as a paratrooper in the U.S. Army, in addition to being a ditchdigger and a student at Columbia University. He wrote in "the Cornell school" of writing in the 1960s with Thomas Pynchon and Richard Fariña. This school of writing has been defined as having three preoccupations (1) socio-political paranoia, (2) concern with environmental degradation, and (3) awareness of popular culture's unique impact on the American mind. In addition to Pynchon and Fariña, the Cornell School would also include Mary F. Beal, to whom Shetzline was married. The Cornell School could also be said to include, or be influenced by, Vladimir Nabokov and Kurt Vonnegut. It stands in contrast to Cornell's older literary traditions, such as the literary traditions represented by E.B. White and Hiram Corson.

In 1968, Shetzline signed the "Writers and Editors War Tax Protest" pledge, vowing to refuse tax payments in protest against the Vietnam War.

== Primary Fiction ==
His first work, DeFord, was published in 1968. DeFord is dedicated to the memory of Fariña. Reviewing DeFord, author Thomas Pynchon wrote, "What makes Shetzline's voice a truly original and important one is the way he uses these interference-patterns to build his novel, combining an amazing talent for seeing and listening with a yarn-spinner's native gift for picking you up, keeping you in the spell of the action, the chase, not letting go of you till you've said, yes, I see; yes, this is how it is." DeFord was a seminal contra use of geography as a metaphor.

Heckletooth 3 followed the year after DeFord, and was noted as a lead text in the new ecology movement of the 1970s. Of Heckletooth 3, The Whole Earth Catalog wrote, "[t]here are some writers and books that I only hear about from others. William Eastlake is one. So is David Shetzline, notably for his forest fire novel Heckletooth 3. Ken Kesey went on about it to me years ago. And last week Don Carpenter firmly put the book into my hand. Well they’ve got my agreement. My summer logging the Oregon woods tells me that Shetzline has the work right, the fire and the men right. He especially has the language – Oregon laconic. It’s an introspective action-novel about virtue. I mean, about detail."

== Other works ==
A short story, "A Country of Painted Freaks" appeared in the Paris Review in 1972. Shetzline also conducted the critically acclaimed memoir interviews of William Appleman Williams in 1976, entitled Typescript: A Boy from Iowa Becomes a Revolutionary.

In the 1970s he was a regular contributor to the CoEvolution Quarterly edited by Stewart Brand.

== Network ==
Shetzline was friends with both Fariña and Pynchon. As Shetzline noted regarding the relationship between Fariña and Pynchon, "I think Tom recognized that Richard had a magic with language, that he was genuinely gifted, and I think Tom recognized that Richard worked with his gifts, he worked consciously to hone them. Tom always hung back. You didn't find out much about his writing from him, but he was always complaining that he wasn’t getting enough writing done, and that is the tip-off that somebody is absolutely haunted as a writer. Richard knew Tom was as serious about writing as he was. I think Pynchon was also fascinated with Richard's effect on women, which was powerful. Pynchon developed a capacity to appeal to women who would then sort of go after him." In the foreword to Greening the Lyre, David Gilcrest described Shetzline as "a true artisan of the pen and fly rod, has earned my respect and thanks as an exemplar in all things philosophical and anadromous."

He is currently an organizer of the Wickes Beal Studio, in Oregon.

== Bibliography ==
- DeFord, novel (Random House, 1968)
- Heckletooth 3, novel (Random House, 1969)
- "Education of a Water Dog," article, The American Sportsman (Winter 1969)
- "Country of the Painted Freaks," short story, The Paris Review 54 (Summer 1972)
- "From 'Field Guide to Western Oregon'," excerpt from unpublished novel, Coevolution Quarterly 7 (Fall 1975)
- "Memory One: Getting Started in Orygun," article, Coevolution Quarterly 10 (Summer 1976)
