= Francesco Turrisi =

Grammy Award winning artiste

Francesco Turrisi is a multi instrumentalist and composer from Sicily. His album They're Calling Me Home with Rhiannon Giddens won the 2022 Grammy Award for Best Folk Album category.

== Discography ==
- Odd Set (Diatribe Recordings, 2007)
- Yurodny: Evenset (Diatribe, 2008)
- L'Arpeggiata • Christina Pluhar – Los Impossibles (Naïve, 2009)
- Songs of Experience (Taquin Records, 2013), and Fulvio Sigurtà, Joao Lobo
- Grigio (Diatribe Records, 2013)
- There Is No Other (with Rhiannon Giddens, Nonesuch Records, 2019)
- They're Calling Me Home (with Rhiannon Giddens, Nonesuch, 2021)
