= 4 Little Girls =

1997 film by Spike Lee

- Promotional poster
- Directed by: Spike Lee
- Produced by: Spike Lee; Sam Pollard; Daphne A McWilliams
- Cinematography: Ellen Kuras
- Edited by: Sam Pollard
- Music by: Terence Blanchard
- Production companies: HBO Documentary Films; 40 Acres & A Mule Filmworks
- Distributed by: HBO
- Release dates: July 9, 1997 (U.S.); September 6, 1997 (Canada)
- Running time: 102 minutes
- Country: United States
- Language: English
- Budget: $1,000,000
- Box office: $130,146 (U.S. sub-total)

4 Little Girls is a 1997 American historical documentary film about the murder of four African-American girls (Addie Mae Collins, Carol Denise McNair, Cynthia Wesley, Carole Rosamond Robertson) in the 16th Street Baptist Church bombing in Birmingham, Alabama on September 15, 1963. The film was directed by Spike Lee and nominated for an Academy Award for Best Documentary.

The events inspired the 1964 song "Birmingham Sunday" by Richard and Mimi Fariña, which was used in the opening sequence of the film, as sung by Joan Baez, Mimi's sister. They also inspired the 1963 tune "Alabama" by John Coltrane, which is also included in the soundtrack.

4 Little Girls premiered on June 25, 1997, at the Guild 50th Street Theatre in New York City. It was produced by Lee's production company, 40 Acres and a Mule Filmworks, and Home Box Office (HBO).

In 2017, the film was selected for preservation in the United States National Film Registry by the Library of Congress as being "culturally, historically, or aesthetically significant".

== Synopsis ==
A local chapter of the Ku Klux Klan placed bombs at the 16th Street Baptist Church and set them off as Sunday services prepared to commence on the morning of September 15, 1963. Four young girls, ranging in age from 11 to 14, were killed in the explosion, which also caused anywhere between 14 and 22 additional injuries. The deaths provoked national outrage, and, the following summer, the United States Congress passed the Civil Rights Act of 1964, which was signed by President Lyndon B. Johnson. The bombing is marked in history as a critical and pivotal moment in the Civil Rights Movement.

The film covered the events in Birmingham, Alabama, in 1963 related to civil rights demonstrations and the movement to end racial discrimination in local stores and facilities. In 1963, Rev. Dr. Martin Luther King Jr. arrived in the town to help with their strategy and to speak at the funeral of the four young girls. People of the community met at the 16th Street Baptist Church while organizing their events. The demonstrations were covered by national media, and the use by police of police dogs and pressured water from hoses on young people shocked the nation. The large number of demonstrators who were arrested resulted in local jails filling capacity.

The film ends with the trial and conviction in 1977 of Robert Edward Chambliss, also known as Dynamite Bob, as the main person responsible for the bombing, though he is said to have been only one of four Klan members involved. The film also references black churches being set on fire in Birmingham in 1993, giving the impression that, while progress has been made, there are some things that still have not changed.

Lee uses interviews with family and friends of the girls, government officials, and civil rights activists, as well as home movies and archival footage, to not only tell the story of the four girls' lives but also to provide a greater historical and political context of the times.

== Production ==
Lee first became interested in making a film about the Birmingham bombing in 1983, when he was a student at New York University. After reading a New York Times Magazine article about the incident, he was moved to write to Chris McNair, the father of Denise, one of the victims, to ask for permission to tell her story on film. McNair turned down the young, aspiring filmmaker. "I was entering my first semester at N.Y.U. So my skills as a filmmaker were nonexistent, and at that time, Chris McNair was still hesitant to talk about it," Lee said in a 1997 interview with Industry Central's The Director's Chair. "I believe timing is everything. So it took ten years of Chris thinking about this and ten years of myself making movies for this to come together."

According to McNair, he changed his mind about supporting Lee's film idea due to learning about the depth and precision of Lee's research. McNair said, "[I]t's very important that this be done accurately and correctly. In all his research, he [Lee] showed that he was objective and seeking a broad section of opinion. I'm a stickler for the facts."

At first, Lee had intended to create a dramatic reproduction of the incident, but eventually, he decided that would not be the best approach, and the project became a documentary. Once he secured funding, he went to Birmingham with a small skeleton film crew, as he wanted the families to be as comfortable as possible during the interviews. Sam Pollard served as a producer and the editor and Ellen Kuras was the director of photography of the film.

Lee had developed a relationship with Kuras while working on an HBO project called Subway Stories, which was an anthology of short films compiled by Jonathan Demme (though Lee's film did not make the final cut due, in part, to conflict between him and Demme). Kuras said of her desire to shoot 4 Little Girls, "I was really interested because my background is in political documentaries ... I always felt that one of the reasons that I had got into filmmaking was that I wanted to use my craft to be able to say something about the human condition, however I could, in my own humble way. For me this was an opportunity to make a small contribution."

Lee's partnership with Sam Pollard had begun on Mo' Better Blues when Pollard was recommended to replace Barry Alexander Brown, who was unavailable because he was directing his own film, as editor. Pollard originally refused the overture because he was busy working on his segments of Eyes on the Prize, but ultimately, he accepted, and he has since become one of Lee's most frequent collaborators. Their first few films together were fiction, but Pollard's background was in documentary, and he was key to guiding the structure of 4 Little Girls. He said about his role:

Basically it was to help with the conception of the structure, to edit it ... We spent a lot of time screening dailies together. We could come to 40 Acres at 7:00 a.m., and we would spend three hours a day screening dailies for two weeks straight ... We talked, selected all the material that we liked, and I started working on the structure in the editing room. Spike was asking if he needed narration and what the structure should be. I basically said the structure should be that there are parallels—the family, the history of the community—and then they come together on the explosion.

== Reception ==
=== Critics and public ===
The film was nominated for an Academy Award for Best Documentary Feature. On Rotten Tomatoes, it holds an approval rating of 100% based on 23 reviews, with an average rating of 8.8/10. The website's critical consensus reads: "4 Little Girls finds Spike Lee moving into documentary filmmaking with his signature style intact -- and all the palpable fury the subject requires." Metacritic, which uses a weighted average, assigned the film a score of 88 out of 100, based on 16 critics, indicating "universal acclaim".

=== Box office ===
It was initially planned for the film to first be seen by the public when it was aired on HBO, but, after seeing the final product, the production team decided it was important to release the film in theaters before running it on television. Accordingly, 4 Little Girls opened in American theaters on July 9, 1997, and closed on October 2, 1997. It grossed $130,146 from a total of four theaters. In its opening weekend, it earned $13,528 from a single theater, which was 10.4% of its total gross. It cost approximately $1 million to make, funded by HBO.

== See also ==
- Civil rights movement in popular culture
- 1956 Sugar Bowl
- Civil rights movement
- Timeline of the civil rights movement

== Bibliography ==
- Aftab, Kaleem; Lee, Spike (2006), Spike Lee: That's My Story and I'm Sticking to It, W. W. Norton & Company, ISBN 0-393-32894-5
