= Luminescent Orchestrii =

Luminescent Orchestrii are a gypsy punk band from New York City, whose music also incorporates elements of Middle Eastern, punk, and Appalachian music. The band's founding members were Sxip Shirey, Sarah Alden, Rima Fand, Julie Carney, Aaron Goldsmith, and Benjy Fox-Rosen.

== Discography ==
=== Studio albums ===
- The Luminescent Orchestrii (2003)
- Too Hot to Sleep (self-released, 2005)
- Neptune's Daughter (Nine Mile, 2009)

=== EPs ===
- Carolina Chocolate Drops/Luminescent Orchestrii (collaborative EP with the Carolina Chocolate Drops) (Nonesuch, 2011)
