= Hubby Jenkins =

American musician

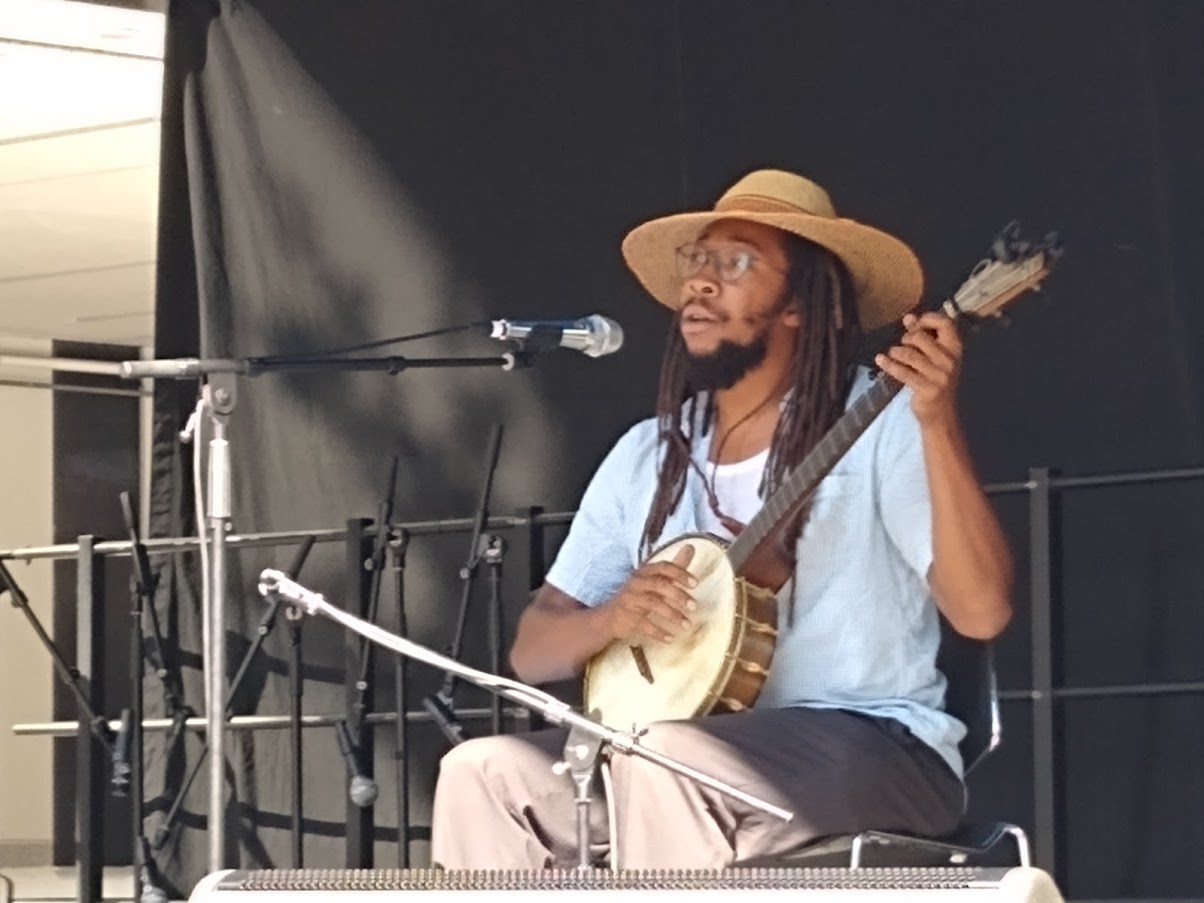
- Jenkins performing at the IBMA Bluegrass Live! festival in Raleigh, North Carolina, on October 2, 2021

Background information
- Born: Brooklyn, New York, U.S.
- Genres: Old-time music
- Instruments: Banjo, guitar
- Years active: 2010–present
- Label: Need To Know Music
- Website: hubbyjenkins.com

Hubby Jenkins is an American multi-instrumentalist who studies and performs old-time American music. He is a former member of the Carolina Chocolate Drops and the Rhiannon Giddens band, and has been nominated for Grammy and Americana awards.

== Biography ==
Hubby Jenkins was born and raised in Brooklyn, New York. He attended PS 11 in Clinton Hills and Brooklyn Technical High School. As a young man, he played the saxophone and bass guitar. After discovering the music of Skip James and Bukka White, he began exploring how African Americans influenced American roots music.

== Career ==
Jenkins began performing as a busker in New York City, then booked gigs in local coffee shops and bars. From 2010 to 2016, Jenkins was a member of the Carolina Chocolate Drops, playing instruments including guitar, banjo, and bones. Their album Leaving Eden was nominated for a Grammy Award for Best Folk Album in 2012. Along with other members, he was later part of the Rhiannon Giddens band. The two groups played a major role in the revival of Black string band tradition.

Jenkins was nominated for Instrumentalist of the Year at the 2015 Americana Awards.

== Discography ==
=== Albums ===
Title	Details
Hubby Jenkins	Release date: July 1, 2016; Label:
The Fourth Day	Release date: April 22, 2020; Label: Need to Know Music / Skunkworks
