= Joe Thompson (musician) =

American musician

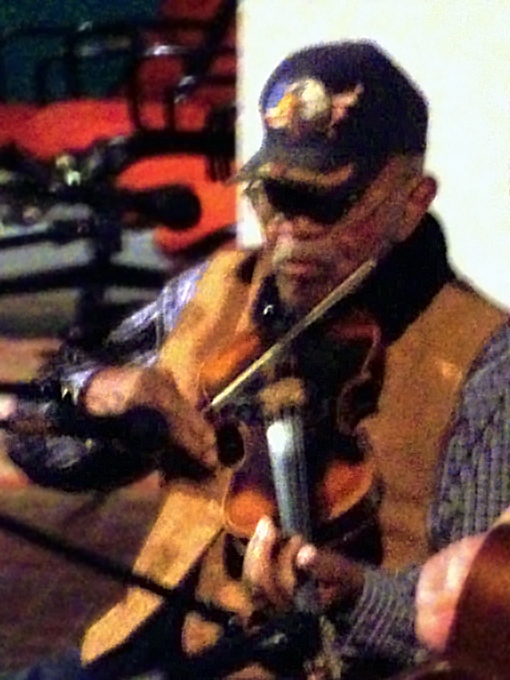
- Thompson in 2009

Background information
- Born: Joseph Aquiler Thompson; December 9, 1918; Orange County, North Carolina, U.S.
- Died: February 20, 2012 (aged 93) Alamance County, North Carolina, U.S.
- Genre: Old-time fiddle
- Occupations: Fiddle player, singer, songwriter
- Instruments: Fiddle, vocals
- Years active: Mid 1920s–2012
- Labels: Global Village; Rounder

Joseph Aquiler Thompson (December 9, 1918 – February 20, 2012) was an American old-time fiddle player, and one of the last musicians to carry on the black string band tradition. Accompanied by his cousin Odell, Thompson was recognized with several honors for performances of the old-time style, particularly when the genre was repopularized in the 1970s. In the 1980s and 1990s, he recorded his first studio albums, consisting of a repertoire rooted in the authentic string band approach.

== Biography ==
Thompson was born in Orange County, North Carolina on December 9, 1918. His father John, a fiddler, and uncle Walter, a banjo player, performed at local square dances and corn shuckings. At seven years-old, when Thompson took up the fiddle himself, he closely observed his father's techniques which were rooted in old-time African tradition. He joined his father and uncle for performances, and later formed his own string band with his older brother Nate and cousin Odell, both of whom were banjo players. Much of the band's repertoire consisted of family songs passed down since before the American Civil War, including "Hook and Line" and "Cindy Gal".

After serving in a segregated unit during the Second World War and as the popularity for traditional string band music waned, Thompson stopped playing the fiddle to work in a furniture factory as a rip saw operator for 28 years. In 1973, musicologist Kip Lornell, then a recent college graduate, heard rumors about Joe and Odell Thompson's mastery of the old-time style and urged the duo to make a comeback. Thompson and Odell began performing as the New String Band Duo across the United States and abroad, becoming popular fixtures at folk festivals. Among the notable gigs the duo played at included Carnegie Hall, the National Folk Festival, the Festival of American Fiddle Tunes, and the Tennessee Banjo Institute.

In 1989, they recorded the studio album Old-Time Music from the North Carolina Piedmont for the Global Village record label. The duo was awarded the North Carolina Folk Heritage Award in 1991 for preserving black folk music traditions. When Odell died in a car accident in 1994, Thompson pondered quitting music altogether but recorded the solo album Family Traditions, released on Rounder Records in 1999. A stroke Thompson suffered in 2001 severely impaired the use of his left arm, but after extensive rehabilitation, he returned to playing. Although he lamented at the lack of interest in old-time music, in 2005 he began mentoring the Carolina Chocolate Drops, a modern-day African American string band.

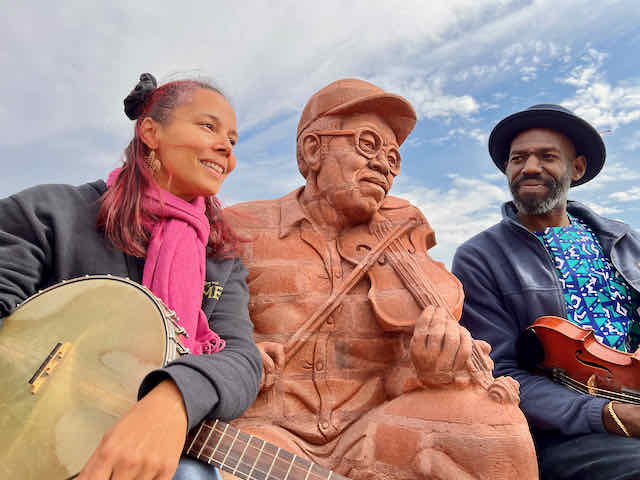
Carolina Chocolate Drops founding members Rhiannon Giddens and Justin Robinson at Joe and Odell Thompson's Memorial in Mebane during the filming of Black Fiddlers

He was a recipient of a 2007 National Heritage Fellowship awarded by the National Endowment for the Arts, which is the United States government's highest honor in the folk and traditional arts. In the same year, he performed at the Kennedy Center for the Performing Arts in Washington, D.C.

Gravestone of Joe Thompson in White Level Cemetery, Mebane

Thompson was married twice and had one son and six step-children. He died in a nursing home in Alamance County, North Carolina from pneumonia; Thompson was 93 years old. Folklorist Wayne Martin commented that "Probably more than anyone else, Joe was the inspiration for a national revival of stringband music among young generations of African American musicians".

== Filmography ==
- The Life and Times of Joe Thompson (2004). Thompson was the subject of a 27-minute documentary film produced and directed by Iris Thompson Chapman.
- Black Fiddlers (2022). Rhiannon Giddens and Justin Robinson recall their learning experiences next to Joe Thompson. Produced by Heritage Film Project and directed by Eduardo Montes-Bradley.
