= Rhiannon Giddens =

American musician (born 1977)

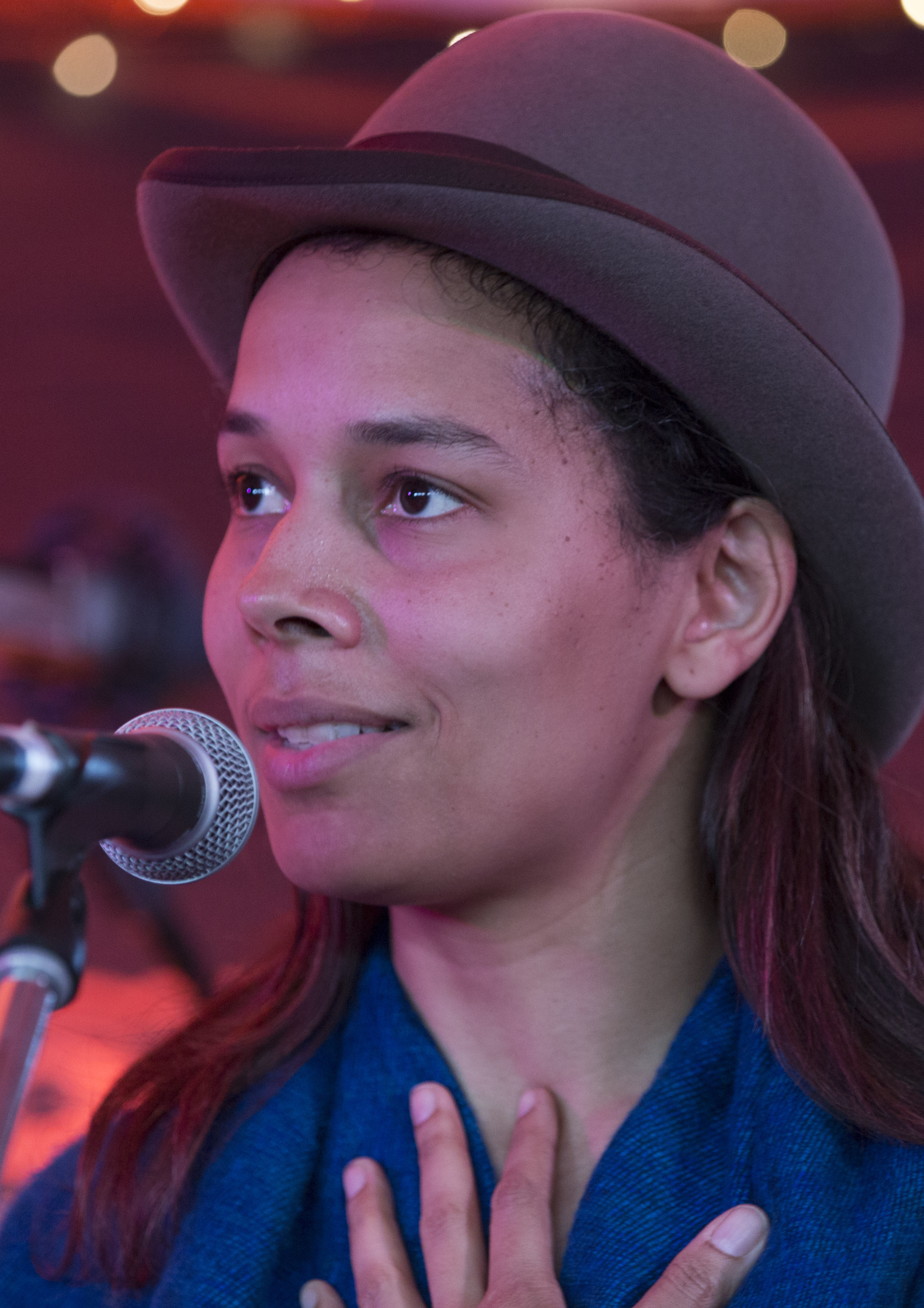
- Giddens in 2016

Background information
- Born: February 21, 1977 (age 49); Greensboro, North Carolina, U.S.
- Genres: Folk; old-time music; bluegrass; country; gospel; blues; jazz; soul; R&B; Celtic; Americana
- Instruments: Vocals; fiddle; banjo; viola
- Years active: 2004–present
- Labels: Music Maker; Nonesuch
- Formerly of: Carolina Chocolate Drops; The New Basement Tapes
- Website: Official website

Rhiannon Giddens (born February 21, 1977) is an American musician, actress, and author known for her eclectic folk music. She is a founding member of the group Carolina Chocolate Drops, where she was the lead singer and played fiddle and banjo.

Giddens is from Greensboro, North Carolina. In addition to her work with the Grammy-winning Chocolate Drops, Giddens has released seven solo albums including: Tomorrow Is My Turn (2015) and Freedom Highway (2017); 2021's There Is No Other and They're Calling Me Home (both collaborations with Italian multi-instrumentalist Francesco Turrisi); You're the One (2023). She appears in the Smithsonian Folkways collection documenting Mike Seeger's final trip through Appalachia in 2009, Just Around The Bend: Survival and Revival in Southern Banjo Styles – Mike Seeger's Last Documentary (2019).

In 2014, Giddens participated in the T Bone Burnett-produced project The New Basement Tapes, along with several other musicians, which set a series of recently discovered Bob Dylan lyrics to newly composed music. The resulting album, Lost on the River: The New Basement Tapes, was in the Billboard top 40. She worked on the song "Mountain Hymn" for the popular video game Red Dead Redemption 2.

In 2023, the opera Omar, co-written by Giddens and Michael Abels, won a Pulitzer Prize for Music.

== Early life ==
Giddens is of multiracial ancestry. Her father, David Giddens, is European-American. Her mother, Deborah Jamieson, is a descendant of African Americans and Native American tribes including the Lumbee, Occaneechi, and Seminole. Giddens does not claim a specific tribal affiliation. Her parents met as college students in the city of Greensboro. Giddens' parents separated soon after her birth, when Deborah came out as a lesbian.

Rhiannon and her sister Lalenja grew up in Greensboro and nearby rural Gibsonville. Lalenja Harrington is a director for Beyond Academics, a four-year certificate program supporting students with intellectual and developmental disabilities, at the University of North Carolina at Greensboro. A singer and songwriter herself, Harrington occasionally collaborates with her sister on musical projects.

== Musical career ==
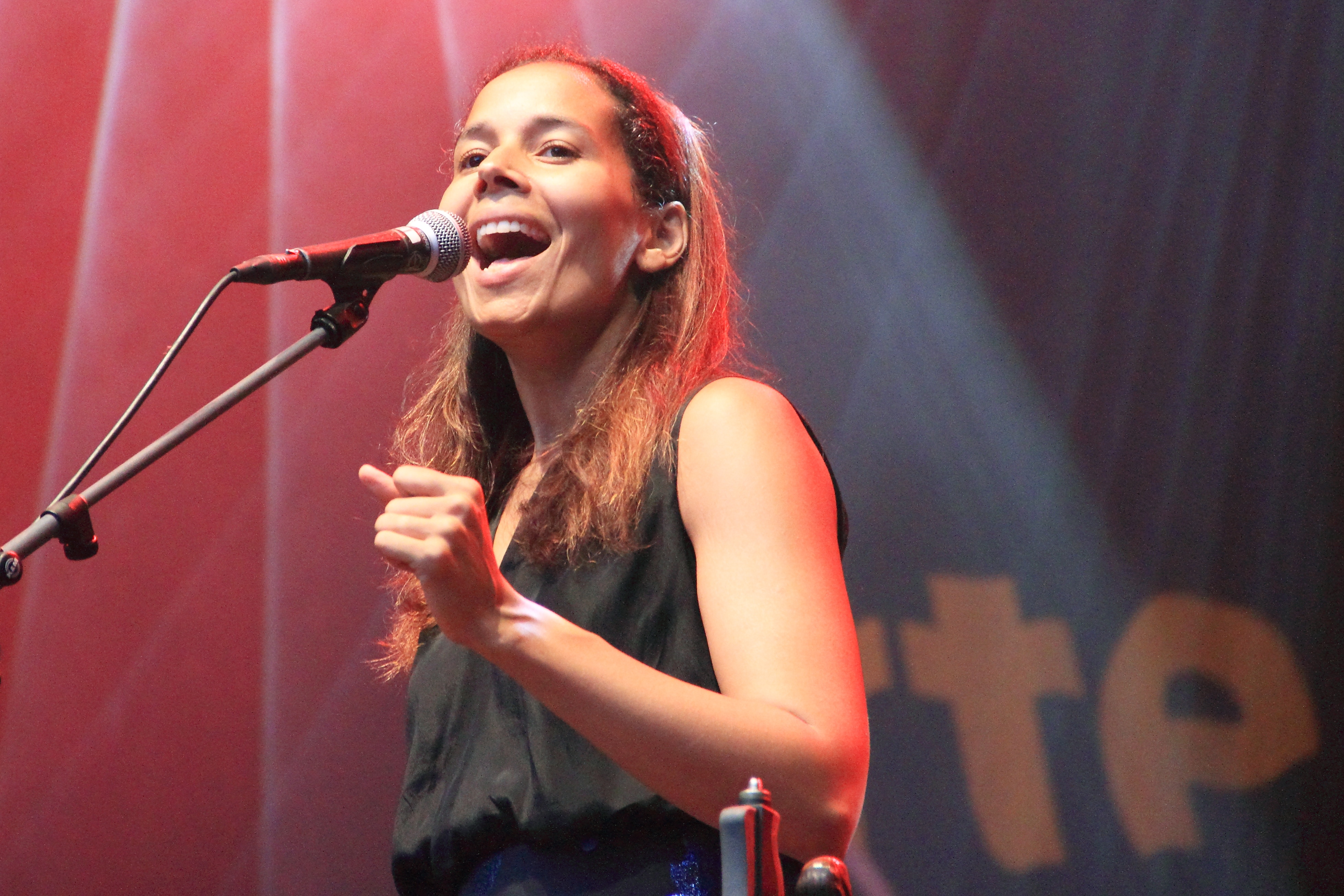
Giddens at Rudolstadt, July 2015

Giddens is a 1995 alumna of the North Carolina School of Science and Mathematics in Durham, North Carolina, and a 2000 graduate of Oberlin Conservatory at Oberlin College, where she studied opera.

In 2005, Giddens attended the Black Banjo Then and Now Gathering in Boone, North Carolina. At the time she was spending time participating in Scottish traditional music competitions (specializing in the Gaelic lilting tradition, also known as mouth music). There she met Dom Flemons and Súle Greg Wilson. The three started playing together professionally as a "postmodern string band", Sankofa Strings. During the same period, Giddens was also a regular caller at local contra dances and featured in a Celtic music band called Gaelwynd. Later in 2005, after both Gaelwynd and Sankofa Strings released albums, Giddens and Flemons teamed with other musicians and expanded the Sankofa Strings sound into what became the Grammy winning Carolina Chocolate Drops.

In 2007, Giddens contributed fiddle, banjo, "flat-footin'" dancing, and additional vocals to Talitha MacKenzie's album Indian Summer. Performing as a soprano, Giddens and mezzo-soprano Cheryse McLeod Lewis formed a duo called Eleganza to release a CD in 2009. Because I Knew You... consists of classical, religious, theater, and movie music. Giddens and Lewis were middle school classmates who reconnected after college while working in the same office. The friends started singing together in 2003, but did not begin recording until 2008.

As of November 12, 2013, Giddens became the only remaining original member of the Carolina Chocolate Drops. In 2013, she began pushing further into a solo career. She participated in "Another Day, Another Time", a concert inspired by the Coen brothers film Inside Llewyn Davis. Many critics have said that Giddens had the best performance at what was called "the concert of the year". Late in 2013, she contributed the standout a cappella track "We Rise" to the LP We Are Not For Sale: Songs of Protest by the North Carolina Music Love Army – a collective of activist musicians from North Carolina founded by Jon Lindsay and Caitlin Cary. Giddens' protest song joins contributions from many other Carolina musical luminaries on the Lindsay-produced compilation (11/26/13 via Redeye Distribution), which was created to support the North Carolina NAACP and the Moral Monday movement. In early 2014, she recorded Lost on the River: The New Basement Tapes alongside Elvis Costello, Marcus Mumford, Taylor Goldsmith, and Jim James. The album was produced by T Bone Burnett and is a compilation of partial, unreleased lyrics written by Bob Dylan.

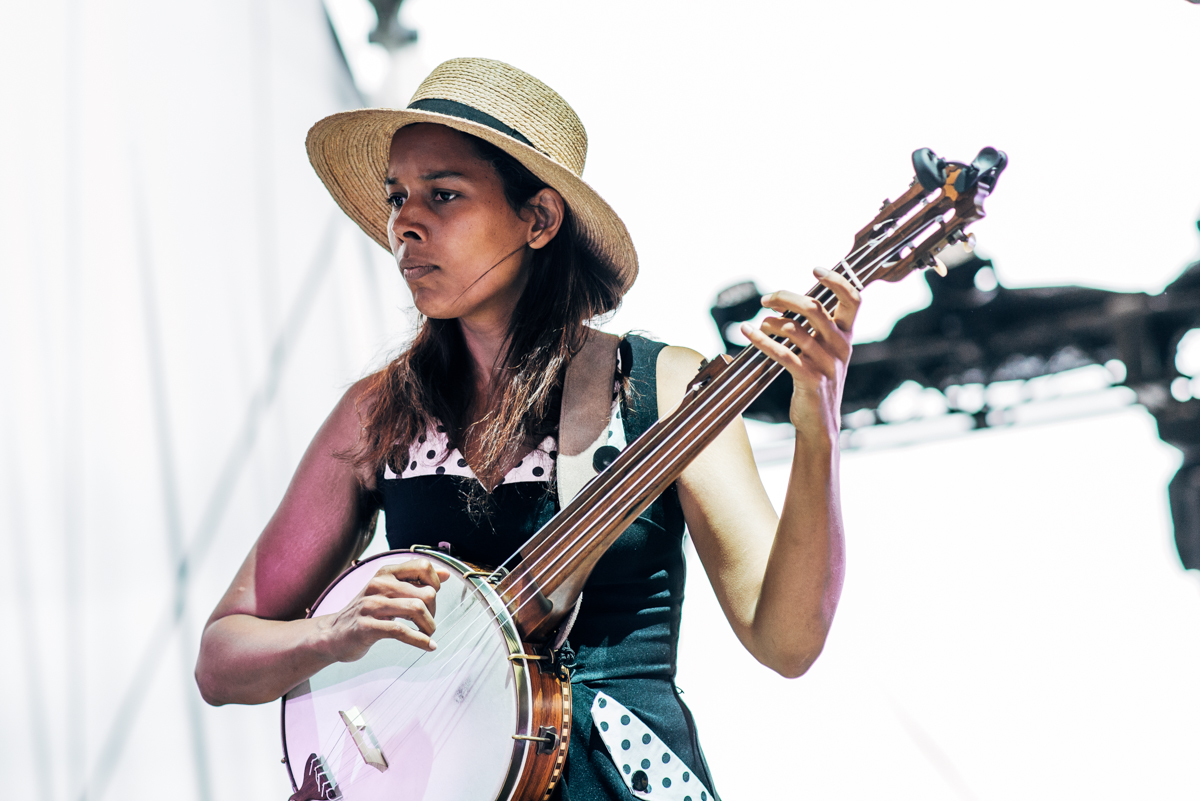
Giddens performing at the Interrstellar Rodeo in Edmonton, July 2015

In February 2015, Giddens released her debut solo album, Tomorrow Is My Turn, on Nonesuch Records. Also produced by Burnett, the album contains songs made famous by Patsy Cline, Odetta, Dolly Parton, Nina Simone, and others. The Wall Street Journal said the album "confirms the arrival of a significant talent whose voice and distinctive approach communicate the simmering emotion at the core of the songs." Additionally, the Los Angeles Times called the album "a collection that should solidify her status as one of the bright new lights in pop music."

In July 2015, she performed at the TFF Rudolstadt world music, folk and dance festival in Germany. Her performance was broadcast live by the German national public radio Deutschlandfunk. Rhiannon appears on Jon Lindsay's single "Ballad of Lennon Lacy" (Redeye Distribution, August 21). The song tackles the mysterious hanging death of Lennon Lacy, a black teen from rural Bladenboro southeast of Lumberton, North Carolina.

On November 27, 2015, to coincide with the Black Friday Record Store Day event, Giddens released Factory Girl (EP) on Nonesuch Records, which contained music culled from the same T Bone Burnett–produced sessions which yielded Tomorrow Is My Turn. A digital version of Factory Girl was made available December 11, 2015. The sessions for the album and EP were in Los Angeles and Nashville, with a multi-generational group of players assembled by Burnett. Musicians on Factory Girl include Burnett; fiddle player Gabe Witcher and double bassist Paul Kowert of Punch Brothers; percussionist Jack Ashford of Motown's renowned The Funk Brothers; drummer Jay Bellerose; guitarist Colin Linden from Toronto; veteran Nashville session bassist Dennis Crouch; and Giddens's Carolina Chocolate Drops touring band-mates, multi-instrumentalist Hubby Jenkins, and beat-boxer Adam Matta.

Giddens appeared on Jools Holland's Hootenanny on December 31, 2015, shown on BBC Two. She performed songs from her 2015 album Tomorrow Is My Turn, including "Waterboy" and a cover of "St. James Infirmary Blues" with Tom Jones. In January 2016, she was selected to take part in Transatlantic Sessions. The collaboration between American and Celtic musicians is a coveted honor. The ensemble performed as part of Celtic Connections in Glasgow, and a short UK/Irish tour. Her performances on the tour included the stirring tribute to David Bowie "It Ain't Easy". On October 8, 2016, she was featured on Austin City Limits.

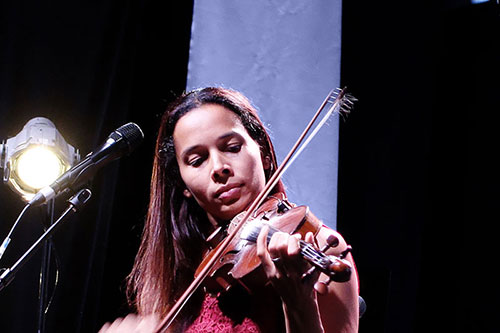
Giddens performing at Aarhus Festival

Later in 2016, Giddens became the first American to be honored as Folk Singer of the Year at the BBC Radio 2 Folk Awards, and it was announced that she would be receiving the prestigious Steve Martin Prize for Excellence in Banjo and Bluegrass. She was the first woman and first person of color to receive the prize. Also in 2016, it was announced that Giddens and the Carolina Chocolate Drops would be inducted into the North Carolina Music Hall of Fame.

In 2017, Giddens became only the fourth musician to perform at both the Newport Folk and Jazz Festivals. Later that year, she gave the keynote address at the World of Bluegrass Business Conference 2017. According to Bluegrass Today, "Giddens (has) shattered long-held stereotypes... By the time she was done, she had systematically dismantled the myth of a homogenous Appalachia." In June 2017, Giddens appeared in the multi-award-winning documentary The American Epic Sessions, directed by Bernard MacMahon, where she recorded "One Hour Mama" and English folk ballad "Pretty Saro", on the restored first electrical sound recording system from the 1920s. Both performances were released on Music from The American Epic Sessions: Original Motion Picture Soundtrack. After hearing the playback of these direct-to-disc recordings, she said, "you feel like your soul is coming out of the speaker."

In October 2017, Giddens was named one of the 2017 class of MacArthur "Genius" Fellows. The organization noted, "Giddens' drive to understand and convey the nuances, complexities, and interrelationships between musical traditions is enhancing our musical present with a wealth of sounds and textures from the past." She further demonstrated the broad range of her musical interests with several projects. In early November, she performed as a soprano with the Louisville Orchestra in Teddy Abrams' multimedia tribute to Muhammad Ali, The Greatest. A week later, she sang with the Cincinnati Pops Orchestra for their live recording of American Originals: 1918, which explored the early development of jazz during the post WWI era. In January 2018, Giddens co-produced (with Dirk Powell) Songs of Our Native Daughters for Smithsonian Folkways. Written and recorded with fellow artists Amythyst Kiah, Leyla McCalla, and Canadian singer Allison Russell, "The album confronts the ways we are culturally conditioned to avoid talking about America's history of slavery, racism, and misogyny." Also in early 2018, the Nashville Ballet announced that Rhiannon Giddens had been commissioned to write the music for Lucy Negro, Redux, a new dance choreographed by artistic director, Paul Vasterling. Based on the book of the same name by Caroline Randall Williams, its premise is that Shakespeare's Dark Lady was of African descent. The ballet premiered in February 2019. In March 2018, Giddens fulfilled a previously announced engagement as guest curator for the Cambridge Folk Festival in Cambridge, England by inviting Peggy Seeger, Kaia Kater, Birds of Chicago, Amythyst Kiah, and Yola Carter to perform at the event.

Giddens recorded vocals for Silo Songs, an audio installation created by composer Brad Wells for Hancock Shaker Village. She contributed a song, "Mountain Hymn", to the popular video game Red Dead Redemption 2 which was released in October 2018. The song was written with Daniel Lanois. In December 2018, she began hosting a podcast called Aria Code with Rhiannon Giddens produced by the Metropolitan Opera and WQXR-FM. The program is about individual arias having a lasting impact on audiences and how singers prepare to perform them. In 2019, Giddens released two studio albums: Songs of Our Native Daughters with Allison Russell, Leyla McCalla, and Amythyst Kiah and There Is No Other with Italian musician Francesco Turrisi.

For the 2020 Spoleto Festival USA in Charleston, South Carolina, Giddens was commissioned to create an opera based on the Arabic language autobiography of Omar Ibn Said, a highly literate and cultured Torodbe (Muslim cleric) from the Fula people of modern Senegal, who was enslaved in an intertribal war against the Imamate of Futa Toro and brought aboard a slave ship to Charleston in 1807. She wrote the libretto and was the lead composer with help from co-composer Michael Abels. Owing to the COVID-19 pandemic, the world premiere of Omar was postponed until 2022. It received the 2023 Pulitzer Prize in Music.

In July 2020, Giddens was named artistic director of the cross-cultural music organization Silkroad. The position had been vacant since 2017 when Silkroad's founder, Yo-Yo Ma, stepped down. On August 17, 2020, Giddens guest-hosted the BBC Radio 2 Blues Show while its regular host Cerys Matthews was on her holidays.

Giddens was awarded an honorary Doctor of Letters degree from the University of North Carolina at Greensboro for her lasting impact on the UNCG community and work in music. She sang "Calling Me Home" by Alice Gerrard at a virtual commencement after accepting the degree in December 2020. In 2023, she was awarded an honorary Doctor of Music from Princeton University. In 2023, Giddens joined the programming lineup at Wondrium leading the series "The Banjo: Music, History and Heritage." In 2022, she was named the musical director of the 2023 Ojai Music Festival. On 7 July 2024, she and her band headlined the Gate to Southwell Festival.

Giddens performs on Beyoncé's 2024 album, Cowboy Carter. She plays banjo and viola on the album's hit single, "Texas Hold 'Em."

== Scholarship on the Racial History of American Music ==
In addition to being a musician, Giddens has described herself as an "armchair historian" and often discusses where her music comes from culturally and geographically. She works to discover the historical roots behind American music and challenge the racial labels prescribed to musical genres. In her twenties, Giddens found out about the links between instruments of African origin in common American music, such as the banjo, and became interested in learning more about these connections. The obscuring of commonly accepted racial categories that musical genres have historically been placed in is a key aspect of Giddens' work, specifically focusing on the whiteness attributed to country music, a topic she has discussed in relation to her heritage as a mixed-race American. Giddens affirms that her scholarship on the intertwined histories of black and white music is important to develop new understandings of cultural belonging and exclusion.

== Acting ==
In 2017 and 2018, Giddens appeared in the fifth and sixth seasons of CMT's Nashville as Hannah Lee "Hallie" Jordan, a social worker and gospel singer who is a significant character in the Juliette Barnes storyline. She appeared in 11 episodes and performed several songs, which have been made available following each episode.

== Documentary ==
Giddens is featured in the 2024 documentary Cover Your Ears produced by Prairie Coast Films and directed by Sean Patrick Shaul, discussing music censorship.

She is featured in the 2022 documentary Black Fiddlers next to Justin Robinson. In the film, produced by Heritage Film Project and directed by Eduardo Montes-Bradley, Giddens shares her memories of Joe Thomson and Odell Thomson.

== Author ==
Giddens announced that she would have four children's books published by Candlewick Press. The first two books, scheduled for release in Fall 2022, are based on the lyrics of her songs "Build A House" and "We Could Fly" with illustrations by Monica Mikai and Briana Mukodiri Uchendu respectively.

=== Books by Giddens ===
- Build A House by Rhiannon Giddens, illustrated by Monica Mikai. Candlewick, Somerville, Mass., 2022.
- We Could Fly by Rhiannon Giddens, illustrated by Briana Mukodiri Uchendu. Candlewick, Somerville, Mass., 2023.
- Go Back and Fetch It: Recovering Early Black Music in the Americas for Fiddle and Banjo by Kristina R. Gaddy and Rhiannon Giddens. University of North Carolina Press, 2025.
- Color Me Country: A Celebration of Black Women Who Shaped Country Music, edited by Kelly McCartney and Rissi Palmer, illustrated by Rhiannon Giddens. Candlewick Studio, 2026.

== Personal life ==
Giddens married Irish traditional musician Michael Laffan in 2007. They have a daughter born in 2009 and a son born in 2013. They had separated as of 2018.

Around 2018, Giddens began a relationship with her Italian musical partner Francesco Turrisi. They released albums together in May 2019 and April 2021. In a Facebook post in December 2024, Giddens announced that her romantic relationship with Turrisi had come to an end after almost seven years, but that they would continue making music together.

In 2021, Giddens was living in Limerick, Ireland.

Giddens's family history was explored on the April 7, 2026 episode of Finding Your Roots.

== Discography ==
=== Solo ===
==== Studio albums ====
- Tomorrow Is My Turn (2015)
- Freedom Highway (2017)
- There Is No Other with Francesco Turrisi (2019)
- They're Calling Me Home with Francesco Turrisi (2021)
- You're the One (2023)
- What Did the Blackbird Say to the Crow (2025)
- Hope Is the Thing with Feathers (2026)

==== Live albums ====
- Live at Jazzfest 2016 (2016)
- Live at Jazzfest 2017 (2017)

==== EPs ====
- We Rise (2014)
- Factory Girl (2015)

==== Singles ====
- "Cruel World" (2019)
- "Just the Two of Us" featuring Sxip Shirey (2020)
- "Don't Call Me Names" (2020)
- "Julie's Aria" with Bill Frisell and Francesco Turrisi (2022)
- "Build a House" with Yo-Yo Ma and Francesco Turrisi (2022)

=== As member of Carolina Chocolate Drops ===
List of albums as member of Carolina Chocolate Drops, with selected details and chart positions
Title	Album details	Peak chart positions			
Title	Album details	US	US Grass	US Folk	US Heat.
Dona Got a Ramblin' Mind	Release date: September 12, 2006; Label: Music Maker	—	—	—	—
The Great Debaters Soundtrack; (with Alvin Youngblood Hart, Sharon Jones and Teenie Hodges)	Release date: December 11, 2007; Label: Atlantic	—	—	—	—
Heritage	Release date: February 18, 2008; Label: Dixiefrog	—	—	—	—
Carolina Chocolate Drops & Joe Thompson; (recorded live at MerleFest, April 25, 2008)	Release date: May 26, 2009; Label: Music Maker	—	—	—	—
Genuine Negro Jig	Release date: February 16, 2010; Label: Nonesuch	150	1	2	2
Carolina Chocolate Drops/Luminescent Orchestrii EP	Release date: January 25, 2011; Label: Nonesuch	—	3	11	32
Leaving Eden	Release date: February 24, 2012; Label: Nonesuch	123	1	6	2
"—" denotes releases that did not chart

=== As member of Gaelwynd ===
- Out on the Ocean: Music of the British Isles (2004)
- Northern Lights (2005)

=== As member of The New Basement Tapes ===
- Lost on the River: The New Basement Tapes (2014)

=== As member of Our Native Daughters ===
- Songs of Our Native Daughters (2019)

=== As member of Silkroad Ensemble ===
- Phoenix Rising (EP) (2023)
- American Railroad (2024)

=== Additional collaborations ===
- As member of Sankofa Strings, Colored Aristocracy (2005)
- As Elftones & Rhiannon Giddens, All the Pretty Horses (2009)
- As Laurelyn Dossett, Rhiannon Giddens, Eric Robertson & Bennett Sullivan, The Music of Beautiful Star (2009)
- As Eleganza (with Cheryse McLeod Lewis), Because I Knew You... (2009)
- As Mike Compton, Laurelyn Dossett, Rhiannon Giddens, Joe Newberry, Jason Sypher, The Gathering (2011)
- As The Giddens Sisters (with Lalenja Harrington), I Know I've Been Changed (2013)
- As Ben Harper and Rhiannon Giddens, Black Eyed Dog (single) (2020)
- As Amanda Palmer and Rhiannon Giddens, It's a Fire (single) (2020)
- As Renée Fleming, Alison Krauss, Rhiannon Giddens, and Yannick Nézet-Séguin, Before the Deluge (single) (2021)
- As Rhiannon Giddens, Resistance Revival Chorus, and Crys Matthews, How I Long For Peace (single) (2024)
- As Rhiannon Giddens and Justin Robinson, What Did the Blackbird Say to the Crow (2025)

=== Nashville ===
See Nashville discography Seasons Five and Six for songs performed by Hallie Jordan (played by Rhiannon Giddens)

=== Other significant appearances (lead, duet, trio, featured solo) ===
- "Dreamland" and "Clothes of My Man", Sonic New York (Sxip Shirey) (2010)
- "Brightest and Best", "Christ Child Lullaby", "A Babe is Born All of a Maid", and "Down in Yon Forest", The Winter Moon (Immigrant's Daughter) (2010)
- "Lay Your Money Down", Shamrock City (Solas) (2012)
- "Outside Man Blues", Yes We Can (An Apple A Day) (2013)
- "The Vanishing Race", Look Again to the Wind: Johnny Cash's Bitter Tears Revisited (Various Artists) (2014)
- "Now to Conclude Our Christmas Mirth", "Christmas Day Is Come", and "The Enniscorthy Christmas Carol", The Wexford Carols (Caitríona O'Leary) (2014)
- "Waterboy", "'S iomadh rud tha dhìth orm / Ciamar a nì mi 'n dannsa dìreach", and "Didn't Leave Nobody But The Baby", Another Day, Another Time: Celebrating the Music of Inside Llewyn Davis (Various artists) (concert recorded live September 29, 2013, album released January 2015)
- "Up In Arms", Rhythm & Reason (Bhi Bhiman) (2015)
- "Julie" and "Cluck Old Hen", Tunes from David Holt's State of Music (Various Artists) (2015)
- "Ballad of Lennon Lacy" (single) (Jon Lindsay with Rhiannon Giddens and NC Music Love Army) (2015)
- "Kill a Word", Mr. Misunderstood (Eric Church) (2015)
- "The Good Fight", Real Midnight (Birds of Chicago) (2016)
- "St. James Infirmary Blues", Sing Me Home (Yo-Yo Ma & The Silk Road Ensemble) (2016)
- "Manman", A Day for the Hunter, A Day for the Prey (Leyla McCalla) (2016)
- "Come Sunday" and "Rocks in My Bed", American Tunes (Allen Toussaint) (2016)
- "Woman of Constant Sorrow", "Just Drive By, Firefly", and "Bach, Stevie Wonder and Janelle Monae", A Bottle of Whiskey and a Handful of Bees (Sxip Shirey) (2017)
- "West End Blues (Live)" and "Shake Sugaree", Tunes from David Holt's State of Music 2 (Various Artists) (2017)
- "One Hour Mama" and "Pretty Saro", Music from The American Epic Sessions (Various Artists) (2017)
- "Factory Girl" and "Lullaby", Folk Songs (Kronos Quartet) (2017)
- "So Pretty", For Lenny (Lara Downes) (2018)
- "My Baby Likes Bacon" and "Mansell's Waltz", Hopes & Dreams: The Lullaby Project (Various Artists) (2018)
- "I'm Just Wild About Harry", "I Ain't Gonna Play No Second Fiddle", "Swing Along", and "I Ain't Got Nobody", American Originals: 1918 (Cincinnati Pops Orchestra) (2018)
- "Dream Variation", Holes in the Sky (Lara Downes) (2019)
- "The May Morning Dew", The Great Irish Songbook (Dervish) (2019)
- "Georgia Buck" and "Cripple Creek", Just Around the Bend: Survival and Revival in Southern Banjo Sounds (Mike Seeger's Last Documentary) (Various Artists) (2019)
- "Moonlight", "Mountain Hymn", and "Mountain Banjo", The Music of Red Dead Redemption 2: Original Soundtrack (Various Artists) (2019)
- "All Babies Must Cry" (single) (Sxip Shirey) (2019)
- "Wish in Vain" (w/ Dirk Powell), Good Music to Avert the Collapse of American Democracy, Volume 2 (Various Artists) (2020 1-day benefit release)
- "All You Fascists Bound To Lose" (written by Woody Guthrie), This Joy (Resistance Revival Chorus) (2020, Righteous Babe Records)
- "Woman of the House", Canvas (Natalie MacMaster and Donnell Leahy) (2023)
- "Texas Hold 'Em" (single) (Beyoncé) (2024)
- "The Ballad Of Sally Anne", My Black Country - The Songs Of Alice Randall (Various Artists) (2024)
- “Don’t Come Around Here No More” feat. Silkroad Ensemble and Benmont Tench, (2024, Petty Country: A Country Music Celebration)
- "Prologue: Oh Freedom", "Mud Song", "Ahmaud", and "An Echo, An Ending", Songs In Flight (Shawn Okpebholo) (2025)

== Awards and nominations ==
Awards and nominations for Rhiannon Giddens
Year	Association	Category	Nominated work	Work
2010	Americana Music Awards	Duo/Group of the Year	Carolina Chocolate Drops	Nominated
2011	Grammy Awards	Best Traditional Folk Album	Genuine Negro Jig	Won
2012	Americana Music Awards	Duo/Group of the Year	Carolina Chocolate Drops	Nominated
2013	Grammy Awards	Best Folk Album	Leaving Eden	Nominated
2015	Americana Music Awards	Album of the Year	Tomorrow Is My Turn	Nominated
2015	Americana Music Awards	Artist of the Year	Rhiannon Giddens	Nominated
2016	Grammy Awards	Best Folk Album	Tomorrow Is My Turn	Nominated
2016	International Folk Music Awards	Album of the Year	Tomorrow Is My Turn	Won
2016	BBC Radio 2 Folk Awards	Folk Singer of the Year	Rhiannon Giddens	Won
2016	Steve Martin Prize for Excellence in Banjo and Bluegrass	N/A	Rhiannon Giddens	Won
2016	North Carolina Music Hall of Fame	Induction	Rhiannon Giddens and the Carolina Chocolate Drops	Won
2017	Grammy Awards	Best American Roots Performance	Factory Girl	Nominated
2017	Grammy Awards	Best Folk Album	Factory Girl	Nominated
2017	Living Blues Awards	Critics Poll Blues Artist of the Year (Female)	Rhiannon Giddens	Won
2017	Americana Music Awards	Album of the Year	Freedom Highway	Nominated
2017	Country Music Association Awards	Musical Event of the Year	Kill a Word (with Eric Church)	Nominated
2017	MacArthur Fellowship			Won
2018	International Folk Music Awards	Album of the Year	Freedom Highway	Won
2018	Songlines Music Awards	Americas	Freedom Highway	Won
2018	Living Blues Awards	New Recordings (Traditional & Acoustic)	Freedom Highway	Won
2019	Americana Music Honors & Awards	Legacy of Americana	Rhiannon Giddens	Won
2019	Americana Music Honors & Awards	Duo/Group of the Year	Our Native Daughters	Nominated
2019	Americana Music Honors & Awards	Artist of the Year	Rhiannon Giddens	Nominated
2020	Grammy Awards	Best American Roots Performance	I'm on my Way	Nominated
2020	Blues Music Awards	Acoustic Blues Artist	Rhiannon Giddens	Nominated
2020	Living Blues Awards	Blues Artist of the Year (Female)	Rhiannon Giddens	Nominated
2020	Living Blues Awards	Most Outstanding Blues Singer	Rhiannon Giddens	Nominated
2020	Living Blues Awards	Best Live Performer	Rhiannon Giddens	Nominated
2020	Living Blues Awards	Critics Poll Most Outstanding Musician (Other/Banjo)	Rhiannon Giddens	Won
2020	Living Blues Awards	Producer of the Year: New Recording	Rhiannon Giddens & Dirk Powell (Songs of Our Native Daughters)	Won
2021	Blues Music Awards	Traditional Blues Female Artist	Rhiannon Giddens	Nominated
2021	Americana Music Honors & Awards	Duo/Group of the Year	Our Native Daughters	Nominated
2022	Grammy Awards	Best American Roots Song	Avalon	Nominated
2022	Grammy Awards	Best Folk Album	They're Calling Me Home	Won
2022	Songlines Music Awards	Fusion	Rhiannon Giddens with Francesco Turrisi	Nominated
2023	Blues Music Awards	Traditional Blues Female Artist	Rhiannon Giddens	Nominated
2023	Blues Music Awards	Acoustic Blues Artist	Rhiannon Giddens	Nominated
2023	Society of Composers & Lyricists Awards	Jury Award	Omar	Won
2023	Pulitzer Prize	Music	Omar	Won
2024	Grammy Awards	Best American Roots Performance	"You Louisiana Man"	Nominated
2024	Grammy Awards	Best Americana Album	You're The One	Nominated
2025	Grammy Awards	Best American Roots Performance	"The Ballad of Sally Anne"	Nominated
2026	Grammy Awards	Best Folk Album	What Did The Blackbird Say To The Crow	Nominated
2026	University of Limerick (Irish World Academy of Music and Dance)	Honorary Doctorate	Career achievement contributions to music, film, theatre, and culture.	Awarded
