= Carolina Chocolate Drops =

American string band

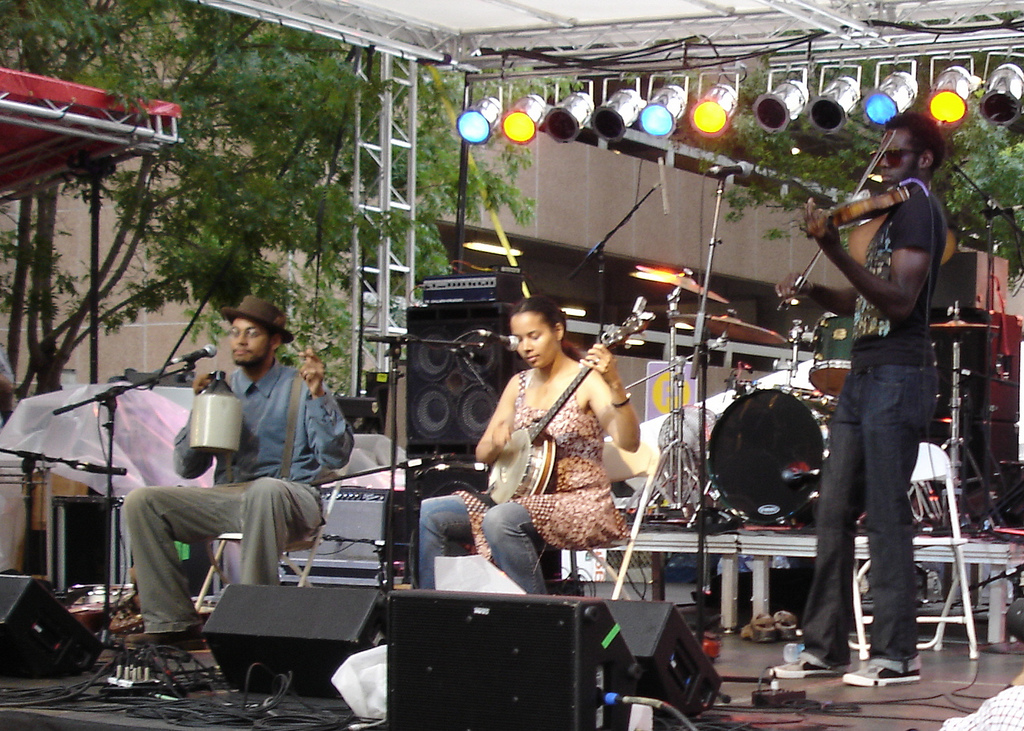
- The Carolina Chocolate Drops performing in Birmingham, Alabama, in June 2008.

Background information
- Origin: Durham, North Carolina, U.S.
- Genres: Old-time, Americana, skiffle
- Years active: 2005–2014, 2025
- Labels: Nonesuch/Elektra Records; Dixiefrog; Music Maker
- Past members: Rhiannon Giddens; Hubby Jenkins; Rowan Corbett; Malcolm Parson; Justin Robinson; Adam Matta; Dom Flemons; Leyla McCalla; Súle Greg Wilson
- Website: https://rhiannongiddens.com/carolina-chocolate-drops

The Carolina Chocolate Drops were an old-time string band from Durham, North Carolina. Their 2010 album, Genuine Negro Jig, won the Grammy Award for Best Traditional Folk Album at the 53rd Annual Grammy Awards, and was number 9 in fRoots magazine's top 10 albums of 2010.

== Career ==
Formed in November 2005, following the members' attendance at the first Black Banjo Gathering, held in Boone, North Carolina, in April 2005, the group grew out of the success of Sankofa Strings, an ensemble that featured Dom Flemons on bones, jug, guitar, and four-string banjo, Rhiannon Giddens on banjo and fiddle and Súle Greg Wilson on bodhrán, brushes, washboard, bones, tambourine, banjo, banjolin, and ukulele, with Justin Robinson as an occasional guest artist. All shared vocals. The purpose of Sankofa Strings was to present a gamut of African American musics: country and classic blues, early jazz and "hot music", string band numbers, African and Caribbean songs, and spoken word pieces. The Carolina Chocolate Drops' original three members: Giddens, Flemons, and Robinson, were all in their twenties when the group formed after Flemons' move from Phoenix (where he and Wilson lived), to North Carolina, home of Giddens and Robinson. Wilson, nearly a generation older than the other members, was occasionally featured with the group into 2010, including contributions to the recordings, Dona Got a Ramblin' Mind, CCD and Joe Thompson, Heritage (with songs culled from Sankofa Strings' independently-released CD, Colored Aristocracy) and nearly half of Genuine Negro Jig. All of the musicians sing and trade instruments including banjo, fiddle, guitar, harmonica, snare drum, bones, jug, and kazoo. The group learned much of their repertoire, which is based on the traditional music of the Piedmont region of North and South Carolina, from the eminent African American old-time fiddler Joe Thompson, although they also perform old-time versions of some modern songs such as Blu Cantrell's R&B hit "Hit 'em Up Style (Oops!)."

The Carolina Chocolate Drops have released five CDs and one EP and have opened for Taj Mahal and, in 2011, Bob Dylan. They have performed on Mountain Stage, MerleFest, and at the Mount Airy Fiddlers Convention. Additionally they have performed on A Prairie Home Companion, Fresh Air, and BBC Radio in early 2010, and at the 2010 Bonnaroo Music Festival in Manchester, Tennessee, and at the 2011 Romp, in Owensboro, Kentucky. On January 17, 2012, they appeared live on BBC Radio 3. They have performed on Grand Ole Opry several times. They have also performed on the UK's BBC Television program, Later... with Jools Holland.

In February 2011, the band announced that beatboxer Adam Matta and multi-instrumentalist Hubby Jenkins would be joining the band, while Justin Robinson was departing. In early 2012, they announced that the New Orleans–based cellist Leyla McCalla was joining the band on its next tour. CCD contributed a track, "Political World," to the Bob Dylan tribute compilation, Chimes of Freedom (album) released in January 2012. Their next album, Leaving Eden, followed soon afterward in February 2012. In an interview, Jenkins said,

"Leaving Eden was an interesting album because [fiddler] Justin [Robinson] had just left the group, and they had already decided to record with Buddy Miller, and had even picked the recording dates. It was an interesting time to be coming in, because they were ready to do different things with the new members. So it was a trial-by-fire period."

That same year, the group toured with Josh Ritter & the Royal City Band. Later in 2012, the Drops were nominated for numerous awards by the Chicago Black Theater Alliance for their work in Keep a Song in Your Soul: The Roots of Black Vaudeville. Staged by the Old Town School of Folk Music in Chicago, written by Lalenja Harrington (Rhiannon Giddens's older sister) and Súle Greg Wilson, and featuring veteran hoofer Reggio MacLaughlin, and ragtime pianist and MacArthur Fellow Reginald R. Robinson, the program examined the hopes and realities, music, and dances of the Great Migration. Also in 2012, the Carolina Chocolate Drops contributed a song, "Daughter's Lament", to The Hunger Games soundtrack.

In 2013, the band was nominated for a Blues Music Award for 'Acoustic Artist'. Also in 2013, the Carolina Chocolate Drops contributed a song, "Day of Liberty", to the two-CD album Divided & United. In November 2013, the Carolina Chocolate Drops announced that Dom Flemons would be leaving to embark on his own solo career, and introduced two new members: cellist Malcolm Parson and multi-instrumentalist Rowan Corbett.

In 2014 the Carolina Chocolate Drops worked with choreographer Twyla Tharp and dancers Robert Fairchild and Tiler Peck to create Cornbread Duet. 2014 was also the year that group stopped regularly performing together, and members have pursued solo work and other projects since. Hubby Jenkins left the band in 2016. Rhiannon Giddens has released a number of solo recordings and in 2020 was named the artistic director of the Silk Road Project.

The original members of the Carolina Chocolate Drops reunited for the inaugural Biscuits & Banjos Festival in Durham, North Carolina on April 26, 2025.

== Members ==
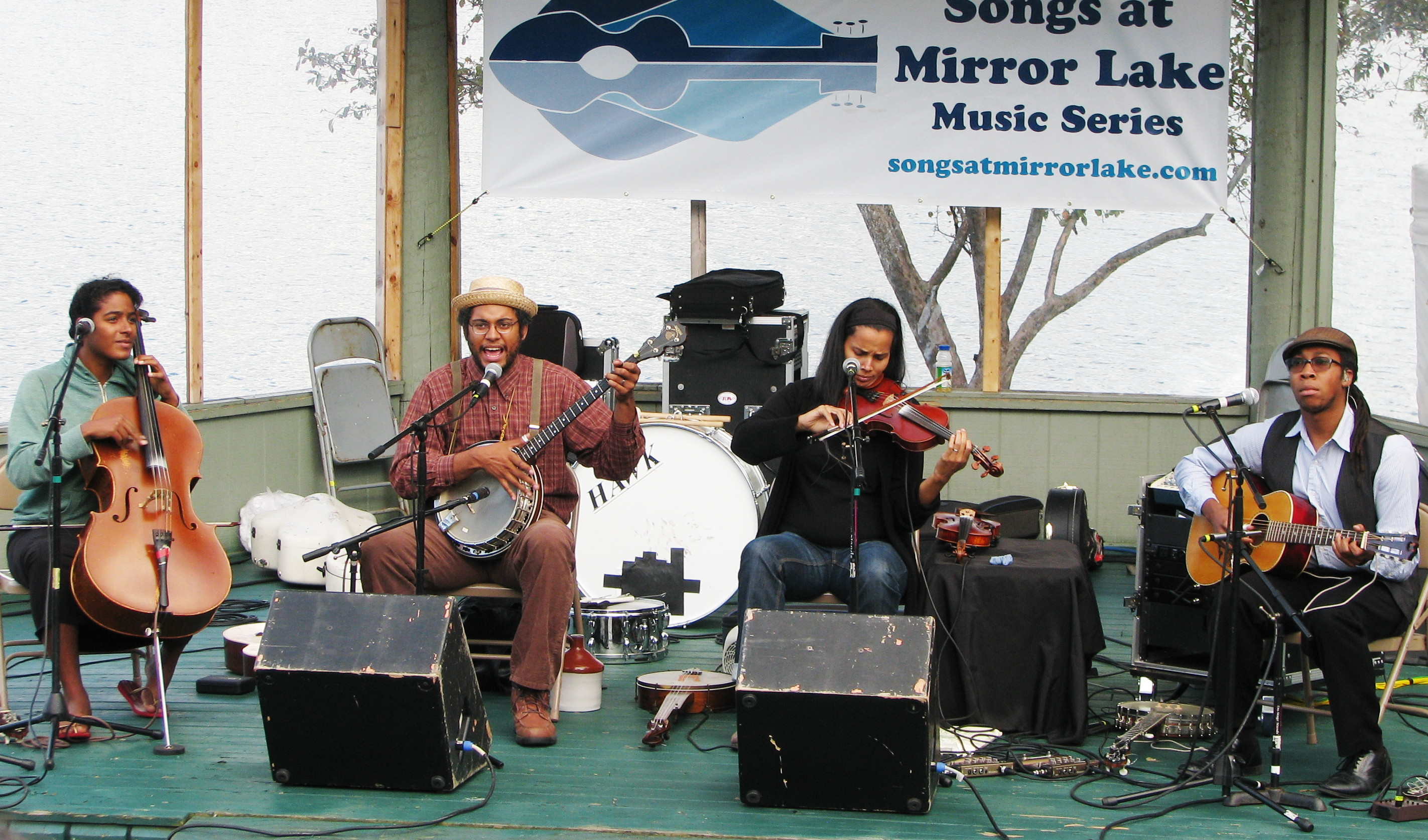
Carolina Chocolate Drops at Lake Placid, New York, in 2012. Left to right: Leyla McCalla, Dom Flemons, Rhiannon Giddens, Hubby Jenkins

Members in 2014

- Rhiannon Giddens: 5-string banjo, dance, fiddle, kazoo, voice
- Hubby Jenkins: Guitar, mandolin, 5-string banjo, bones, voice
- Rowan Corbett: Guitar, bones, snare drum, cajon, djembe
- Malcolm Parson: Cello, melodica

Previous

- Dom Flemons: 4-string banjo, guitar, jug, harmonica, kazoo, snare drum, bones, quills, voice
- Adam Matta: Beatbox, tambourine
- Leyla McCalla: Cello, tenor banjo, voice
- Justin Robinson: Fiddle, jug, beatbox, dance, voice
- Súle Greg Wilson: 5-string banjo, banjolin, bodhrán, brushes, bones, dance, gourd, kazoo, tambourine, ukulele, voice, washboard

== Discography ==
=== Albums ===
Title	Album details	Peak chart positions			
Title	Album details	US	US Grass	US Folk	US Heat
Dona Got a Ramblin' Mind	Release date: September 12, 2006; Label: Music Maker	—	—	—	—
The Great Debaters Soundtrack (with Alvin Youngblood Hart, Sharon Jones and Teenie Hodges)	Release date: December 11, 2007; Label: Atlantic	—	—	—	—
Heritage	Release date: February 18, 2008; Label: Dixiefrog	—	—	—	—
Carolina Chocolate Drops & Joe Thompson (recorded live at MerleFest, April 25, 2008)	Release date: May 26, 2009; Label: Music Maker	—	—	—	—
Genuine Negro Jig	Release date: February 16, 2010; Label: Nonesuch	150	1	2	2
Carolina Chocolate Drops/Luminescent Orchestrii EP	Release date: January 25, 2011; Label: Nonesuch	—	3	11	32
Leaving Eden	Release date: February 24, 2012; Label: Nonesuch	123	1	6	2
"—" denotes releases that did not chart

=== Music videos ===
Year	Video	Director
2012	"Country Girl"	Thomas Ciaburri

== Films ==
- Don't Get Trouble In You Mind: The Carolina Chocolate Drops' Story (dir. John Whitehead, 2019)
