= Kim Rosen (engineer) =

American audio mastering engineer (b. 1980)

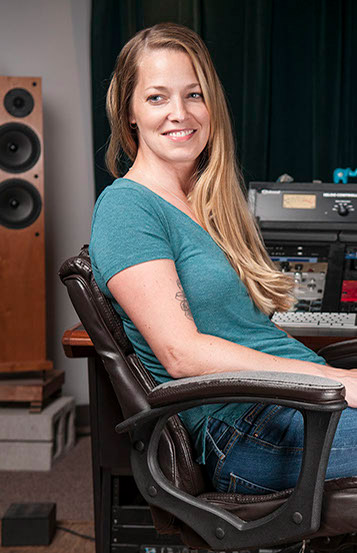
- Rosen at Knack Mastering in Ringwood, NJ

Background information
- Born: Kimberly A. Dumas; 1980 (age 45–46)
- Origin: Ringwood, New Jersey, U.S.
- Occupation: Audio mastering engineer

Kimberly A. Rosen (née Dumas; born c. 1980) is an American Grammy-nominated audio mastering engineer. Since 2009, she owns and runs a mastering studio in Ringwood, New Jersey.

== Career ==
Rosen grew up in the western Massachusetts town of Northampton. With an interest in pursuing a career in the music industry, she began an internship at West West Side Music in Tenafly, New Jersey. There, she assisted chief mastering engineer Alan Douches from 2002 through 2009. While assisting at West West Side Music, Rosen began taking on her own mastering projects and was promoted to staff mastering engineer in 2004. As a mastering engineer at West West Side Music, Rosen mastered a wide range of projects for artists such as Franz Ferdinand, Dashboard Confessional, Jeremy Enigk, and La Dispute. In 2009, Rosen started her own audio mastering studio, Knack Mastering, in Ringwood, New Jersey. Acoustician Chris Pelonis designed her mastering room.

Rosen has participated in speeches on mastering and audio industry-related panels at the AES Convention, Summer NAMM, the PotLuck Audio Conference (Tucson, Arizona), and the Welcome to 1979 Recording Summit (Nashville, Tennessee).

In October 2017, Rosen and her husband Dave launched Whitestone Audio Instruments, a company that designs and produces professional analog processing equipment for audio engineers. Their first product, the P331 Tube Loading Amplifier, was unveiled at the 2018 NAMM Show in Anaheim, California. Rosen is an active member and was elected as a Governor of the New York Chapter of the Recording Academy (Grammys) in 2018.

== Work ==
Rosen works both for independent artists and labels and for major-label record companies and producers. Her most notable releases include works by Bonnie Raitt, Wynonna Judd, Joe Henry, Superdrag, Jeff Bridges, Amy Helm, and Title Fight.

In 2014, she worked on the remake of the Johnny Cash album Bitter Tears, published by Sony Masterworks, with the participation of Emmylou Harris, Steve Earl, Gillian Welch, The Milk Carton Kids and Kris Kristofferson. In 2015, she mastered the rearrangement of "Forever Young", the theme song of the television series Parenthood, performed by Rhiannon Giddens and Iron & Wine for its series finale.

Rosen was nominated for the Grammy Award for Best Engineered Album, Non-Classical for mastering Bonnie Raitt's Dig In Deep (2016) and the Milk Carton Kids' All the Things That I Did and All the Things That I Didn't Do (2018).

Several albums mastered by Kimberly Rosen have received Grammy Award nominations as well as wins. The Bonnie Raitt album Just Like That received four nominations and three wins, including the 2023 Grammy Award for Song of the Year. Aimee Mann's Mental Illness (2017) won the Best Folk Album Grammy, as did the Rhiannon Giddens album They're Calling Me Home (2022).

=== Grammy nominations and awards ===
Year	Album artists	Work	Category	Result
2017	Bettye Lavette	Worthy	Best Blues Album	Nominated
2018	Bonnie Raitt	Dig In Deep	Best Engineered Album, Non-Classical	Nominated
2019	Aimee Mann	Mental Illness	Best Folk Album	Won
2020	Victor Wainwright	Victor Wainwright and The Train	Best Contemporary Blues Album	Nominated
2020	Teresa James And The Rhythm Tramps	Here In Babylon	Best Contemporary Blues Album	Nominated
2020	The Milk Carton Kids	All The Things That I Did And All The Things That I Didn't Do	Best Engineered Album Non-Classical	Nominated
2021	Rhiannon Giddens	I'm On My Way	Best American Roots Performance	Nominated
2022	Nnenna Freelon	Time Traveller	Best Jazz Vocal Album	Nominated
2022	Rhiannon Giddens	They're Calling Me Home	Best Folk Album	Won
2022	Rhiannon Giddens	Avalon	Best American Roots Song	Nominated
2022	Allison Russell	Outside Child	Best Americana Album	Nominated
2022	Allison Russell	Nightflyer	Best American Roots Performance	Nominated
2022	Allison Russell	Nightflyer	Best American Roots Song	Nominated
2023	Bonnie Raitt	Just Like That	Song of the Year	Won
2023	Bonnie Raitt	Just Like That	Best Americana Album	Nominated
2023	Bonnie Raitt	Made Up Mind	Best Americana Performance	Won
2023	Bonnie Raitt	Just Like That	Best American Roots Song	Won
2023	Cheryl B. Engelhardt	The Passenger	Best New Age, Ambient, or Chant Album	Nominated

=== Selected discography ===
Partial discography
Year	Artist	Album	Credited
	True Love	¡Pas Net!	Mastering
	Darius Koski	What Was Once Is by and Gone	Mastering
	Jank	Versace Summer	Mastering
	Uke-Hunt	Uke-Hunt	Mastering
	Shirk Circus	This Band Will Destroy Your Life	Mastering
	The Riverwinds	The Riverwinds	Mastering
	Crystal Yates	The Other Side	Mastering
	Colin Lake	The Ones I Love	Mastering
	The Deadmen	The Deadmen	Mastering
	Julia Rainer	Spirits	Mastering
	Seryn	Shadow Shows	Mastering
	Dorian Allen	Running Back to You	Mastering
	Ben Shea	Red Sunshine	Mastering
	ALSO	Music Belongs In The Background	Mastering
	Turnover	Magnolia	Mastering
	Loretta Hagen	Lucky Stars	Mastering
	Seldan	In Transit	Mastering
	Muncie Girls	From Caplan to Belsize	Mastering
	Southern Cross	Down Below	Mastering
	Koji	Crooked in My Mind	Mastering
	Danl	Crooked Mile	Mastering
	Choir Vandals	Collection	Mastering
	Lewis & Clarke	Blasts of Holy Birth	Mastering
	Birds of Night	Birds of Night	Mastering
2003	The Escape Engine	Celebrity Role Model	Assistant Engineer
2004	The Warriors	War Is Hell	Mastering Assistant
2005	Isadora	They'll Never Take Us Alive	Mastering Assistant
2005	Calico System	They Live	Mastering Assistant
2005	The Burning Season	The Haze of Infatuation	Mastering
2005	Dirty Faces	Superamerican	Mastering
2005	Tim Reale	Story	Mastering
2005	Paint It Black	Paradise	Mastering
2005	The Fire Still Burns	Keeping Hope Alive	Mastering
2005	Collapsar	Collapsar	Mastering
2006	McGill Manring Stevens	What We Do	Mastering
2006	Anagram	The Lights Went Up	Mastering
2006	Torture	Storm Alert	Editing
2006	Lifetime	Somewhere in the Swamps of Jersey	Assistant Mastering Engineer
2006	Bad Wizard	Sky High	Assistant Mastering Engineer
2006	Wuthering Heights	Shadow Cabinet	Mastering
2006	Flying Donuts	Renewd Attack	Mastering Assistant
2006	Incantation	Primordial Domination	Mastering Assistant
2006	Radio 4	Packing Things Up On the Scene [Edit]	Mastering
2006	River City High	Not Enough Saturday Nights	Mastering
2006	To Live and Shave in L.A.	Noon and Eternity	Mastering
2006	Music for Girls	Music for Girls	Mastering
2006	Dirty Faces	Get Right with God	Mastering
2006	Josef K	Entomology	Mastering
2006	Android Lust	Devour, Rise and Take Flight	Mastering Assistant
2006	DK Limb	Defy Define Definition	Assistant
2006	Genghis Tron	Dead Mountain Mouth	Sequencing
2006	Barricade	Be Heard	Mastering
2006	Antilove	6/6/2006	Assistant Engineer
2007	Pain Principle	Waiting for the Flies	Mastering Assistant
2007	Nakatomi Plaza	Unsettled	Assistant, Mastering
2007	Amandine	Solace in Sore Hands	Mastering
2007	Uke of Spaces Corners County	So Far on the Way	Mastering
2007	Alina Simone	Placelessness	Mastering
2007	Nurse & Soldier	Marginalia	Mastering
2007	Kill the Camera	Kill the Camera	Mastering
2007	The Teeth	You're My Lover Now	Mastering
2007	Jason Dove	We Should Be Together	Mastering
2007	John Bustine	Waltzes & Pleas	Mastering
2007	The Recession	Time, Arithmetic and Other Elementary Subjects Not Well Learned	Mastering
2007	Sean Madigan Hoen	The Liquor Witch	Mastering
2007	The Eclectic Collective	The Flux	Mastering
2007	One False Move	Some Kind of Healing	Mastering
2007	Weird Owl	Nuclear Psychology	Mastering
2007	Telenovela Star	Love Lust Sci-Fi & Monsters	Mastering
2007	Avec	Lines	Mastering
2007	Saints Never Surrender	Hope for the Best, Prepare for the Worst	Mastering
2007	Capital	Homefront	Mastering
2007	The High Strung	Get the Guests	Mastering
2007	Bring Back the Guns	Dry Futures	Mastering
2007	D. Jay	Buggy Baloo	Mastering
2007	Mustache!	Babes Say the Hottest Things	Mastering
2008	Jami Sieber	Unspoken	Mastering
2008	Final Drive	Under the Overpass of America	Mastering
2008	I Am The Heat	The Future Doesn't Need Us	Mastering
2008	The Muckrakers	The Concorde Fallacy	Mastering
2008	La Dispute	Somewhere at the Bottom of The River Between Vega & Altair	Mastering
2008	Franz Nicolay	Major General	Mastering
2008	Lydia	Illuminate	Mastering
2008	Destroy Everything	Freedom of Speech Means Talk is Cheap	Mastering
2008	Osaka Popstar	Rock'em O-Sock'em Live!	Mastering Assistant
2008	Doug Paisley	Doug Paisley	Mastering
2008	Saints Never Surrender	Brutus	Mastering
2008	Century	Black Ocean	Mastering
2009	Copernicus	disappearance	Mastering
2009	Spheric Universe Experience	Unreal	Mastering
2009	Kava Kon	Tiki for the Atomic Age	Mastering
2009	Higher Giant	The First Five	Mastering
2009	Acheron	The Final Conflict: Last Days Of God	Mastering
2009	Parasites	Solitary	Mastering
2009	Kelly Carmichael	Queen Fareena	Mastering
2009	Knot Feeder	Light Flares	Mastering
2009	The Peekers	Life in the Air	Mastering
2009	Various Artists	Just Like Heaven: A Tribute to the Cure	Mastering
2009	United States	Instant Everything, Constant Nothing	Mastering
2009	Scale the Summit	Carving Desert Canyons	Mastering
2009	Big Ned	Big Ned	Mastering
2010	Smoke or Fire	The Speakeasy	Mastering
2010	Elk City	House of Tongues	Mastering
2011	Pianos Become the Teeth	The Lack Long After	Mastering
2011	Me First and the Gimme Gimmes	Sing in Japanese	Mastering
2011	Title Fight	Shed	Mastering
2011	Zachary Cale	Noise of Welcome	Mastering
2011	Mother of Mercy	IV: Symptoms of Existence	Mastering
2011	Star Fucking Hipsters	From the Dumpster to the Grave	Mastering
2011	Cobra Skulls	Agitations	Mastering
2012	Various Artists	Vans Warped Tour '12: 2012 Tour Compilation	Mastering
2013	Anthony Green	Young Legs	Mastering
2013	Various Artists	Vans Warped Tour 2013 Compilation	Mastering
2013	Foxing	The Albatross	Mastering
2014	Get Dead	Bad News	Mastering
2014	Various Artists	Warped Tour 2014 Compilation	Mastering
2014	Braid	No Coast	Mastering
2014	Various Artists	Look Again to the Wind: Johnny Cash's Bitter Tears Revisited	Mastering
2014	Jeff Bridges / Jeff Bridges & the Abiders	Live	Mastering
2014	Sarah Jaffe	Don't Disconnect	Mastering
2014	Tigers Jaw	Charmer	Mastering
2014	Wallflower	Summer Daze	Mastering
2015	Bettye LaVette	Worthy	Mastering
2015	Various Artists	Warped Tour 2015 Compilation	Mastering
2015	Nai Harvest	Hairball	Mastering
2015	Tom McBride	Columbia	Mastering
2016	Wynonna Judd	Wynonna & the Big Noise	Mastering
2016	Relick	Twin House	Mastering
2016	Glen Phillips	Swallowed By The New	Mastering
2016	Billy Bragg / Joe Henry	Shine a Light: Field Recordings from the Great American Railroad	Mastering
2016	Real Midnight	Birds of Chicago	Mastering
2016	Anthony Green	Pixie Queen	Mastering
2016	Chely Wright	I Am the Rain	Mastering
2016	Various Artists	Warped Tour 2016 Compilation	Mastering
2016	Get Dead	Honesty Lives Elsewhere	Mastering
2016	Bonnie Raitt	Dig In Deep	Mastering
2016	Jenny Gillespie	Cure for Dreaming	Mastering
2016	Sprowt	2003	Mastering
2017	Dead Heavens	Whatever Witch You Are	Mastering
2017	The Barr Brothers	Queens of the Breakers	Mastering
2017	Rozwell Kid	Precious Art	Mastering
2017	Sarah Jaffe	Bad Baby	Mastering
2017	Direct Hit! / PEARS	Human Movement	Mastering
2017	Various Artists	Warped Tour 2017 Compilation	Mastering
2018	Amy Helm	This Too Shall Light	Mastering
2018	The Gaslight Anthem	The '59 Sound Sessions	Mastering
2018	Steep Canyon Rangers	Out in the Open	Mastering
2018	Victor Wainwright	Victor Wainwright and the Train	Mastering
2018	Brady Rymer / Brady Rymer & the Little Band That Could	Revvin' Up the Reindeer	Mastering
2018	Cicada Rhythm	Everywhere I Go	Mastering
2018	Birds of Chicago	Love In Wartime	Mastering
2018	Birds of Chicago	American Flowers	Mastering
2018	Former Member	Old Youth	Mastering
2018	Joe Henry	Thrum	Mastering
2018	Eric Lindell	Revolution In Your Heart	Mastering
2018	Belly	Dove	Mastering
2018	Sam Phillips	World On Sticks	Mastering
2018	Christine Rosander	Been a Long Time	Mastering
2018	Two Medicine	Astropsychosis	Mastering
2018	The Milk Carton Kids	All the Things That I Did and All the Things That I Didn't Do	Mastering
2019	Foy Vance	To Memphis	Mastering
2019	E.B. The Younger	To Each His Own	Mastering
2019	Rhiannon Giddens	There Is No Other	Mastering
2019	Carla Olson / Todd Wolfe	The Hidden Hills Sessions	Mastering
2019	Danny Lynn Wilson	Peace Of Mind	Mastering
2019	Over the Rhine	Love & Revelation	Mastering
2019	Matt Andersen	Halfway Home by Morning	Mastering
2019	Foy Vance	From Muscle Shoals	Mastering
2019	Doug Seegers	A Story I Got to Tell	Mastering
