= Healing (Weird Owl album) =

Studio album by Weird Owl
- Released: October 15, 2013
- Genre: Psychedelic rock
- Length: 26:35
- Label: A Recordings, Ltd.

Weird Owl chronology
Build Your Beast a Fire (2011)	Healing (2013)	Interstellar Skeletal (2015)

Healing is a mini-LP and the third studio album by the American psychedelic rock band Weird Owl, released on October 15, 2013. The short-length album was released by A Recordings, Ltd., unlike Weird Owl's previous studio albums, Ever the Silver Cord Be Loosed and Build Your Beast a Fire, which were released under the label of Tee Pee Records. Healing received generally mixed reviews upon its release.

== Reception ==
Professional ratings
Review scores
Source	Rating
AllMusic	3.5/5 stars
PopMatters	5/10 stars

David Maine, writing for PopMatters, gave the mini-LP five out of ten possible stars, calling it a "mixed-bag". SLUG Magazine reported that the "five songs are enjoyable and worth the 27 minutes of listening time—especially if you're on a comfortable couch in a room with good mood lighting. I wasn't while listening to Healing, and it was still a pleasant experience".

== Track listing ==
No.	Title	Length
1.	"Change Your Mind"	5:56
2.	"Stars on a Coffin Lid"	4:57
3.	"Seventh of Seven Sundays"	6:51
4.	"Master of the Mysteries"	2:40
5.	"Healing"	6:11
Total length:		26:35

== Personnel ==
- Trevor Tyrrell – guitar, lead vocals
- Jon Rudd – guitar
- Kenneth Cook – bass guitar, keyboards, synths, back-up vocals
- Sean Reynolds – drums
- John Cassidy – keyboards, synths
