= TowIt =

- Original authors: Michael Duncan McArthur, Gregory Meloche
- Developer: TowIt Solutions Inc.
- Release: January 16th 2015
- Stable release: 0.9.4
- Operating system: iOS, Android
- Available in: 1 languages
- List of languages English
- Website: TowIt.io

"TowIt" is a free, global, cross-platform mobile app, website, and Web API that allows civilians to report parking violations and dangerous driving in real-time. The mission is to remove the barriers required to make cities effectively fight and deter bad parking and dangerous driving habits. The company ultimately aims to better existing social controls in order to drive necessary behavioral change through increased education, real-time reporting, optimized enforcement, as well as the resulting reactivity.

== User base and adoption ==
The application has users reporting vehicular infractions in upwards of 30 countries. The top reporting countries are: Portugal, Canada, United States of America and Australia. Users have adopted TowIt for a variety of reasons, usually central to their geographical location and the prominent offences in those specific areas. For instance, the majority of Portuguese reports are cars parked on sidewalks, footpaths and pedestrian crossings, Australian reports are largely focused on the abuse of disabled parking spaces, and in Toronto or San Francisco users generally capture cars parked in bicycle lanes.

== Functions ==
=== Data collection ===
TowIt gathers data on individual parking offences, the prominence of various offence types, as well as recurring offenders. This allows the company to identify trends and hotspots in order to take action against problem vehicles, as well as to help improve urban planning, traffic congestion and gridlock management. Individuals modify or improve an aspect of their behavior in response to their awareness of being observed, theoretically more so when demonstrating selfishness, egocentrism, narcissism and anti-social behavior. The company states that by becoming a user, one can "help TowIt relieve congestion, reduce collisions, open up economies, improve the environment and enhance the lives of urban residents and suburban commuters alike". The company has acknowledged that there are numerous legislative changes that would be required to integrate with governments at any level in many countries.

A simple three-step process allows users to take a photo of an offending vehicle and subsequently verifying the offending vehicle's license plate information before submitting by tapping the TowIt (submit) button. Photographical evidence can only be captured with the camera from within the TowIt application. An Internet connection is required. The company has stated that this was purposefully done for quality control and report validation purposes. Users may only submit and view their own report history on either the iOS or Android applications. Globally submitted reports are displayed uncensored and in aggregate only on the Android application and the TowIt website. The "Global Feed" feature was removed from iOS (see iTunes Connect Acceptance Issues).

TowIt's back-end automatically geotags the report and compares it to local parking by-law data, including by-law types, locations, times, side(s) of street, etc.- where available. Valid reports are posted to the global feed, to the TowIt website, and passed on to municipalities and police for enforcement (where connected).

=== Technologies used under license ===
TowIt currently utilizes the following software or software libraries under license: AngularJS, Apache Cordova, Apple iTunes Store EULA, Chart.js, Google Play Distribution Agreement, Ionic Framework, MongoDB, Moment.js, Python 2.7, Python Flask, and jQuery.

== Company history ==
The TowIt application was conceived by Michael Duncan McArthur on December 5, 2014, as a response to Toronto Mayor John Tory's election mandate to "get this city moving". The application was announced via TowIt's official Twitter page on January 6, 2015. After the initial public announcement, Michael & Gregory were contacted by members of John Tory's staff on January 8, 2015, and invited to demo a prototype at Toronto City Hall on January 12, 2015. The two were also invited to meet with Toronto Councillor Norm Kelly, in his City Hall office, for a subsequent demo of the live Android application on January 28, 2015. A similar meeting and demo took place with members of the Traffic Services department of Toronto Police Service on February 2, 2015.

Michael & Gregory teamed up with friends and Toronto-based developers Dae-Seon Moon, Jesse Malone, and Marcus Veres to complete the prototype in time to meet the city's imposed demo deadline and to launch the initial Android version of the application. TowIt officially launched on the Android platform on January 16, 2015. A subsequent iOS launch took place on March 19, 2015.

=== iTunes connect acceptance issues ===
The iOS version of the application was delayed for approximately two months, only after significant deliberation with Apple's iTunes Connect review board around (as then stated) rule: "14.1 - Any App that is defamatory, offensive, mean-spirited, or likely to place the targeted individual or group in harm's way will be rejected." The result was having to remove the "Global Feed" feature from the iOS platform, in which civilian users could view all recent reports from within the application. This feature still exists on the Android platform.

=== Business and legal ===
TowIt engaged Wildeboer Dellelce, one of Canada's leading business law and transactional corporate finance law firms, on January 17, 2015. The company filed for incorporation as "TowIt Solutions Inc." by both Michael & Gregory in the Canadian province of Ontario on January 22, 2015. TowIt continues to operate under a Freemium business model. The company is 100% bootstrapped and has received no outside investment to date. TowIt was accepted into the MaRS Discovery District's Venture Services program on March 4, 2015.

=== Lobbyist registration ===
After receiving initial press coverage in January and February 2015, an unknown entity reported Michael & Gregory's initial communications with city staff to the City of Toronto's Lobbyist Registrar. This complaint resulted in legal threats of fines received on February 10, 2015, for apparently and unknowingly breaking municipal lobbying by-laws. These fines (of up to $100,000) were eventually withdrawn after Michael & Gregory immediately provided all records of communication with city officials and registered as lobbyists in the City of Toronto on the subjects of By-law / Regulation, Parking, and Technology. Their registration was accepted by the Lobbyist Registrar on March 6, 2015. However, communication with Toronto city staff was reduced greatly as a result, which the company believes may have been the desired intent of the original complaint.

=== Outreach and activism ===
TowIt encourages its global user base to reach out to their local government representatives to promote the app at the users' own will. This tactic is used not only to demonstrate grassroots support, but also to avoid future lobbying issues. On June 2, 2015, the company officially partnered with Australian campaign "No Permit No Park" who advocate for the creation of inclusive communities.

== Reception ==
The Best Planning Apps for 2016 by Planetizen, 5 Toronto apps you should be using by Indie88, 12 Best Apps Made In Canada by TechVibes.
