= Ever Green, Ever Rain =

Studio album by Michael McArthur
- Released: January 25, 2019
- Recorded: July 2–6, 2018
- Studio: United Recording Studios, Stampede Origin Studio
- Genre: Folk, Alternative Rock, Americana, Soul
- Length: 44:45
- Label: Dark River Records
- Producer: Ryan Freeland

Singles from Ever Green, Ever Rain
- 1. "Save Me from the Fire" Released: October 12, 2018; 2. "Elaine" Released: November 26, 2018

Ever Green, Ever Rain is the debut studio album by American singer-songwriter Michael McArthur. It was released on January 25, 2019,

The album was recorded in Los Angeles at United Recording Studios with producer Ryan Freeland, and is the first release on McArthur's record label Dark River Records.

== Reception ==
The album received a positive reception from Billboard, popmatters, and Cowboys & Indians magazine.

== Track listing ==
All tracks are written by Michael McArthur.

Ever Green, Ever Rain
No.	Title	Length
1.	"Earth and Space" (composed by Josh Davis)	1:49
2.	"We Live & We Die"	4:00
3.	"Wild in the Blood"	4:07
4.	"Prisoner"	3:48
5.	"Elaine"	4:14
6.	"Simple Kindness"	3:44
7.	"I've Been Wrong"	3:39
8.	"Warmer Months"	4:01
9.	"Rest's Unknown"	3:24
10.	"Save Me from the Fire"	3:50
11.	"A Conversation Before Bed"	4:57
12.	"Ever Green, Ever Rain"	3:12
Total length:		44:45

== Personnel ==
- Michael McArthur – guitar, lead vocals, background vocals
- Ryan Freeland – producer, engineer, mixing
- Monique Evelyn – assistant engineer
- Kim Rosen – mastering
- Steven Nistor – drums, percussion
- Paul Bryan – bass guitar, background vocals
- Lee Pardini – piano, synth
- Jebin Bruni – piano, synth
- Josh Davis – electric guitar
- Dan Kalisher – electric guitar
- Kristin Mooney – background vocals
- Matt Scott Barnes – design
- Michael Flores – photography
- Michael McArthur – photography
- Jack Catterall – photography
