= Lita (wrestler) =

American professional wrestler (born 1975)

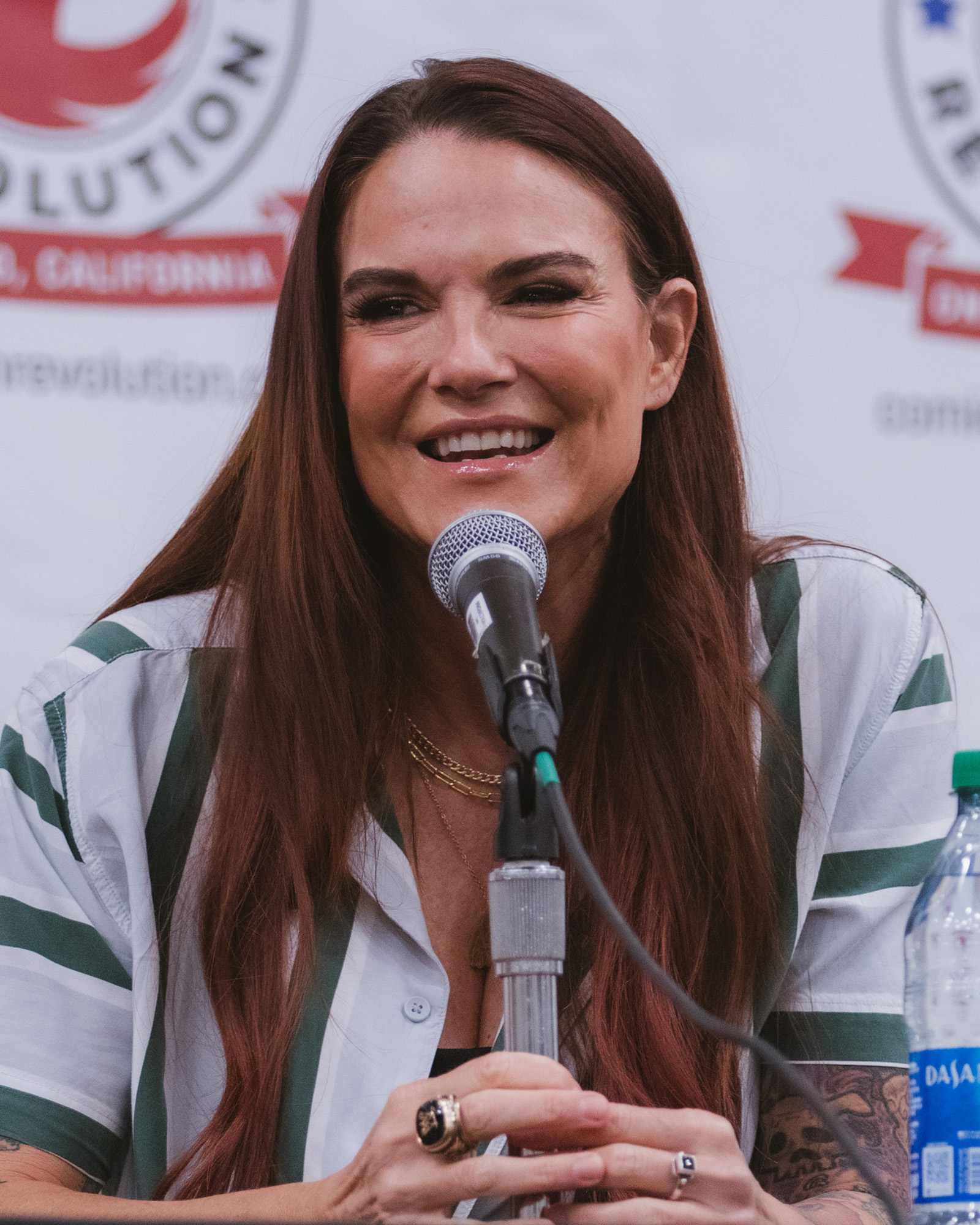
- Lita in 2024

Personal information
- Born: Amy Christine Dumas; April 14, 1975 (age 51) Fort Lauderdale, Florida, U.S.
- Website: amy-dumas.org

Professional wrestling career
- Ring name(s): Angelica; Lita; Miss Congeniality
- Billed height: 5 ft 7 in (170 cm)
- Billed weight: 135 lb (61 kg)
- Billed from: Sanford, North Carolina; Atlanta, Georgia
- Trained by: Dory Funk Jr. El Dandy; Ricky Santana; Kevin Quinn
- Debut: January 9, 1999

Amy Christine Dumas (born April 14, 1975) is an American professional wrestler and singer. She is best known for her tenure in WWE, under the ring name Lita.

Dumas began her wrestling career in 1998 under the ring name Angelica, training and performing in Mexico with Consejo Mundial de Lucha Libre (CMLL). She later competed on the U.S. independent circuit and had a brief run in Extreme Championship Wrestling (ECW) in early 1999. In August 1999, she signed with the World Wrestling Federation (WWF, later WWE), debuting as Lita in February 2000. Initially aligned with Essa Rios, she rose to prominence as part of Team Xtreme alongside Matt and Jeff Hardy, known for their high-flying and daredevil style.

Over the course of her career, she became a four-time WWE Women's Champion. She retired from full-time in-ring competition in 2006 but continued to make sporadic appearances. In 2014, she was inducted into the WWE Hall of Fame. She returned on a part-time basis between 2022 and 2023, and in 2023, she won the WWE Women's Tag Team Championship with Becky Lynch, becoming the first female Hall of Famer to capture a WWE title after induction. She has also worked behind the scenes with WWE as a producer and trainer.

Outside of wrestling, Dumas formed the punk rock band The Luchagors, releasing their self-titled debut album on September 11, 2007.

== Early life ==
Amy Christine Dumas was born in Fort Lauderdale, Florida, to Christine and Michael Dumas on April 14, 1975. She is of Mexican, Puerto Rican and French ancestry. She attended many different schools around Florida throughout her childhood and adolescent years and managed to finish school at Lassiter High School near Atlanta six months before graduation. She majored in education at Georgia State University, but dropped out in 1993 because she felt it was too much like high school.

Later, in Washington, D.C., Dumas played bass guitar in several bands, and worked as a roadie for a band.

== Professional wrestling career ==
=== Early career (1997–1999) ===
Dumas first became interested in wrestling after watching Rey Mysterio Jr., an American luchador, wrestle on an episode of World Championship Wrestling's (WCW) Monday Nitro. She traveled to Mexico in 1997 to learn more about the sport and how to wrestle. Dumas financed her training by dancing in a club under the pseudonym Misty. During her stay in Mexico, Dumas trained under numerous wrestlers, including El Dandy, Kevin Quinn and Ricky Santana. Following the completion of her training, Dumas made several appearances with the Consejo Mundial de Lucha Libre in 1998, under the ring name of Angelica.

After returning to the United States, Dumas continued working as a valet on the independent circuit as Angelica. She made her wrestling debut in a match against indie wrestler Strawberry Fields on January 9, 1999, where she won the match. She worked in Maryland Championship Wrestling (MCW), at one point managing Christopher Daniels. She also made appearances in NWA Mid-Atlantic, where she first met Matt and Jeff Hardy, who offered to train with her.

=== Extreme Championship Wrestling (1999) ===
In April 1999, Dumas was approached by Paul Heyman, the owner and booker of Extreme Championship Wrestling (ECW). Dumas debuted in ECW as Miss Congeniality, the on-screen girlfriend of Danny Doring. Dumas later began using the name Angelica once again and made her pay-per-view debut on July 18 at Heat Wave where Doring, as part of their storyline, proposed to her with a condom.

Dumas was introduced to veteran wrestler Dory Funk, Jr. by ECW wrestler Rob Van Dam, and Funk invited her to attend his wrestling school, The Funkin' Conservatory. Dumas attended Funk's school alongside twenty-three men, graduated from the school in August 1999, and returned to ECW. Meanwhile, Funk and his wife compiled video footage of Dumas and sent it to the World Wrestling Federation. The Federation was sufficiently impressed, and on August 1, 1999, Dumas was signed to a WWF developmental deal. After six months with ECW, she made her final appearance on October 23, 1999, at Re-enter the Sandman.

=== World Wrestling Federation/Entertainment (1999–2006) ===
==== Debut (1999–2000) ====
Dumas debuted on the July 5, 1999, episode of Raw Is War as part of The Godfather's Ho-Train.

After honing her skills at the Memphis Championship Wrestling developmental territory, Dumas was given the ring name Lita and paired with luchador Essa Rios. Lita and Rios made their WWF debut on the February 13, 2000, episode of Sunday Night Heat, where Rios was booked to win the WWF Light Heavyweight Championship from Gillberg (it was only by watching the episode that the two learned their new ring names, decided post-production). Lita mimicked his moves, notably the moonsault and hurricanrana, immediately after he had performed them on an opponent. Essa Rios and Lita had a feud with Eddie Guerrero and Chyna which led to a European title match between Ríos and then-champion Guerrero at Backlash. In May 2000, a storyline was developed in which Lita found Rios cavorting with The Godfather and his "hos", causing tension between them. Rios eventually turned on Lita by powerbombing her after she inadvertently cost him a match, with the Hardy Boyz coming to her rescue.

==== Team Xtreme (2000–2002) ====
As a member of Team Xtreme, Lita developed a more "alternative" image, wearing baggy pants with a thong, which was hiked up high above her pants, clearly exposed—right after she joined Team Xtreme, her popularity skyrocketed. During her time with Team Xtreme, Lita became the only female to ever be physically involved in Tables, Ladders, and Chairs matches in the WWF, effectively interfering at TLC I at Summerslam and TLC II at WrestleMania X-Seven on the Hardy Boyz’ behalf- but her interference was often short-lived as she was brutally speared at ringside by Edge and 3-D'ed by the Dudley Boyz.

In June 2000, Team Xtreme began a storyline with T & A (Test and Albert), with Lita engaging in a rivalry with their manager, Trish Stratus. The rivalry developed into an off-and-on long-term feud between the two women that lasted until Stratus retired in 2006. The storyline ended shortly after Fully Loaded, where Lita pinned Stratus in a six-person intergender tag team match. The two rivals were then part of the main event of the July 31, 2000, edition of Raw Is War in Lita's hometown of Atlanta, which was a tag team match between Lita & The Rock vs Stratus & Triple H, which Lita and The Rock won. Subsequently, Lita began feuding with WWF Women's Champion Stephanie McMahon-Helmsley after winning the first-ever women's battle royal against the likes of Ivory, Jacqueline, Terri and The Kat. In the main event of the August 21, 2000, episode of Raw is War (her second main event in three weeks), Lita defeated Stephanie with a moonsault to win the Women's Championship for the first time, with The Rock as special guest referee. Later, that week Lita was involved in another main event match on Smackdown, this time teaming with the Rock in a winning effort against Kurt Angle and Stephanie McMahon-Helmsley.

Lita held the Women's Championship for 73 days, which included retaining her title in a hardcore match against Jacqueline on October 9. In the course of her reign, Lita became embroiled in the storyline feud between the Hardy Boyz and Edge and Christian. In retaliation for her frequent interference in their matches, Edge and Christian cost Lita the Women's Championship by side-slamming her into the mat, helping Ivory to defeat her in a four-way match on the November 2 episode of SmackDown! Ivory was in a conservative-based stable named Right to Censor at that time, which targeted Lita for her attire and moves. Lita attempted to regain the title on several occasions, wrestling Ivory in a match at Survivor Series where Ivory cut Lita's lower forehead open with her boot heel and she bled heavily, and then another match at Rebellion but Lita was thwarted on each occasion by Steven Richards, Ivory's mentor. She spent the remainder of the year in a storyline with would-be suitor Dean Malenko, on one occasion unsuccessfully challenging him for the WWF Light Heavyweight Championship. Even after repeated rejections from Lita followed by savage beatings by the Hardy Boyz, Malenko was undeterred in his quest to win Lita's affections.

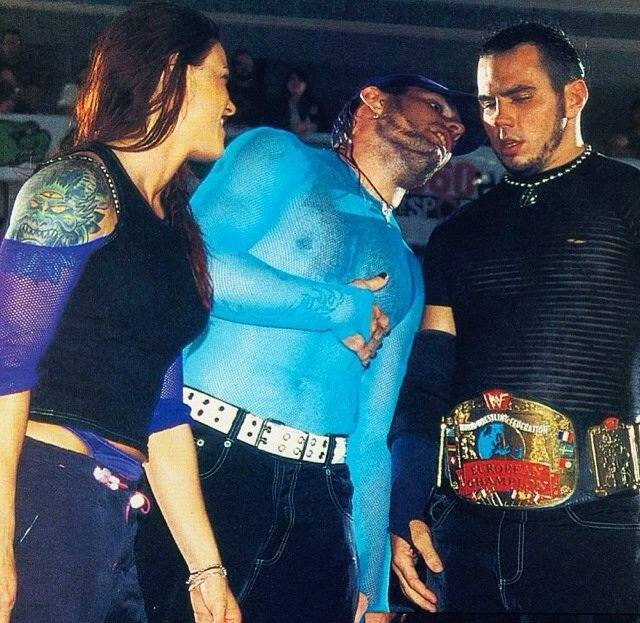
Lita with the Hardy Boyz in 2001

Lita continued to feud with Dean Malenko in early 2001, and she defeated him in a singles bout on the February 19 episode of Raw is War with the assistance of Matt Hardy. Following the match, Hardy kissed Lita, beginning their on-screen relationship and turning their real-life romance into a storyline. On the April 9 edition of Raw is War, she took part in another WWF main event as part of Team Xtreme against a tag team of Stephanie McMahon-Helmsley and the Two Man Power Trip (Stone Cold Steve Austin and Triple H). They won, but Lita took a brutal beating immediately following the match, when she was pedigreed by Triple H and hit four times in the back with a steel chair by Austin, who finished her off with a stunner. Austin had just turned heel and this was an attempt to generate even more heat by beating up the most popular female wrestler in the WWF at the time.

In July 2001, Lita and Trish Stratus joined forces to combat Stacy Keibler and Torrie Wilson, members of The Alliance: Extreme Championship Wrestling and World Championship Wrestling wrestlers who were invading the WWF as part of The Invasion storyline. At the Invasion pay-per-view on July 22, Lita and Stratus defeated Keibler and Wilson in the first ever tag team bra and panties match by stripping their opponents to their underwear. Throughout The Invasion, Lita, Stratus, and Jacqueline feuded with Alliance members Keibler, Wilson, Ivory, and Mighty Molly. The Invasion storyline ended on November 18 at Survivor Series, when Lita took part in a six-pack challenge for the WWF Women's Championship which had been vacated by Chyna earlier that month; Stratus won the match and the title.

In late 2001, the Hardy Boyz began a storyline in which they were feuding with one another. Lita refereed a match between them at Vengeance on December 9. Jeff won the match with a scripted finish that had Lita failing to notice that Matt had placed his leg on the rope during Jeff's successful pin attempt. Continuing the storyline on the following episode of Raw, Matt defeated Lita and Jeff in a handicap match, shortly after informing Lita that both their relationship and the Hardy Boyz were finished. On the December 17 episode of Raw, both Jeff and Lita were sidelined with storyline injuries following a hardcore title match between Jeff and WWF Hardcore Champion The Undertaker, when they were both tossed off the stage by The Undertaker. The injuring of both his brother and ex-girlfriend led to a reconciliation between the members of Team Xtreme, and on the December 20 episode of SmackDown!, Matt faced The Undertaker but was also injured. All three members of Team Xtreme were then removed from WWF television for several weeks.

Team Xtreme returned at the Royal Rumble event in January, with the Hardys as participants and Lita accompanying them. The trio attacked The Undertaker, but were unsuccessful in eliminating him. Lita resumed her pursuit of the WWF Women's Championship and made her in-ring WrestleMania debut at WrestleMania X8 on March 17, facing Stratus and WWF Women's Champion Jazz in a match in which Jazz retained her title by pinning Lita.

==== Neck injury and return (2002–2003) ====
On April 6, Dumas suffered what appeared to be a stinger while filming a fight scene for a role in the season finale of the television program Dark Angel. The rehearsal required that she practice the hurricanrana that would be used in the episode, however, the stunt double Dumas was working with dropped her as she swung through the move, causing her to land on her neck and shoulders. After she underwent a CAT scan, it was revealed that she had suffered three cracks in her vertebrae, necessitating surgery. On April 30, Dumas underwent neck surgery under Dr. Lloyd Youngblood, during which he used a section of her hip to fuse her C5 and C6 vertebrae together. She spent the subsequent year rehabilitating, making appearances on Sunday Night Heat as a color commentator, beginning in October 2002. During her time recovering, Matt and Jeff split thus ending Team Xtreme; Jeff would leave the WWE the following year and Matt would move to SmackDown!.

On the April 21, 2003, episode of Raw, as part of a new storyline, she was fired from her position on commentary by general manager Eric Bischoff after she rejected his advances and his request that she follow in the footsteps of SmackDown!'s Torrie Wilson and pose for Playboy. She returned to the ring after an absence of seventeen months on the September 15 episode of Raw, saving Trish Stratus from a beating at the hands of Molly Holly and Gail Kim. Co-general manager Stone Cold Steve Austin later explained to Eric Bischoff that he had rehired Lita. Lita and Stratus went on to defeat Holly and Kim in a tag team match on September 21 at Unforgiven. Lita feuded with Holly into late 2003, unsuccessfully challenging her for the Women's Championship on November 16 at Survivor Series. On the November 17 episode of Raw, Lita and Matt Hardy were reunited after Hardy was moved from SmackDown! to Raw. Continuing the storyline, Holly interrupted as Hardy was about to propose to Lita, challenging the duo to face her and Bischoff in an intergender tag team match later that evening. Bischoff later added the stipulation that Lita would earn a title shot if she won but would be fired if she lost. Hardy and Lita lost the match after Hardy refused to tag in, with Hardy berating Lita for "selfishly" returning to Raw instead of SmackDown!, claiming that this showed that she cared more about the Women's Championship than about him. Lita was rehired later that evening when Christian informed her that he had used his Survivor Series favor to get Bischoff to reinstate her. One week later, Lita lost to Victoria in the first ever women's steel cage match in WWE history, due to interference from Hardy.

As Lita and Christian appeared to be developing an on-screen relationship, so did Stratus and Chris Jericho. Subsequently, Stratus and Lita participated in an intergender tag team match as partners on the December 1 episode of Raw. After the match, Stratus overheard Jericho talking to then-heel, Christian, about who could sleep with their respective woman first. One week later, Stratus and Lita confronted the men about their real intentions, leading to a feud between the two men and women which resulted in a "Battle of the Sexes" match at Armageddon, which the women lost. A rematch ended in a no contest the next night. On February 23, 2004, Lita was involved in a fatal-4-way elimination match for the Women's Championship which also included Molly Holly, Jazz, and Victoria, who won the match.

==== Storyline with Kane and feud with Trish Stratus (2004–2005) ====
Lita competed in the women's division throughout early 2004, winning a battle royal to become the number one contender for the Women's Championship on the April 5 episode of Raw. Victoria defeated Lita to retain the Women's Championship at Backlash on April 18. The next night on Raw, Lita was reunited with Matt Hardy when Hardy attacked Kane in an attempt to prevent him from harming Lita, beginning a new storyline involving the trio. In the following weeks, Kane began repeatedly assaulting Hardy and attempting to seduce Lita. During the course of the storyline, he kidnapped Lita and held her tied up backstage, and he persuaded Eric Bischoff to give her a title shot at Bad Blood on June 13, where she was defeated by Trish Stratus in a Fatal Four Way match that also included Gail Kim and defending champion Victoria. The next night on Raw, Lita revealed that she was pregnant. One week later, it appeared that Hardy was going to propose to Lita, but he was interrupted by Kane, who claimed to be the father of Lita's child. Two months later, it was revealed that Kane was, in fact, the father. Hardy and Kane feuded for several months, culminating in a "Till Death Do Us Part" match on August 15 at SummerSlam, with the stipulation that Lita would be obliged to marry the winner of the match. Kane won the match, leading to him marrying a reluctant Lita on the August 23 episode of Raw. Despite being married to Kane, Lita thwarted him during his matches, constantly aiding his opponents. On the September 13 episode of Raw, Lita miscarried after Gene Snitsky struck Kane with a chair, resulting in him falling on Lita. The miscarriage led to Lita and Kane joining forces in order to take revenge on Snitsky.

With her pregnancy storyline over, Lita returned to the women's division in November 2004. She began a feud with Trish Stratus, who had constantly degraded her during her pregnancy storyline. When Stratus referred to her as "chubby" because of her weight gain, she retaliated by attacking Stratus backstage. Lita challenged Stratus to a Women's Championship match at Survivor Series, however, due to the months of humiliation and being verbally berated by Stratus, Lita was more concerned with doing as much damage as possible—she broke Stratus's nose and attacked her with a steel chair, promptly leading to her disqualification. This intense and violent match involved levels of physicality that had not been seen before in the women's division. The feud raged on, and on December 6, Lita defeated Stratus in the main event of Raw to win her second WWE Women's Championship. During the course of the match, Lita botched a suicide dive to the outside when she over-rotated by a fraction of an inch, barely escaping serious injury. This move was later used in the buildup to the title rematch she was booked for at New Year's Revolution against Stratus, who claimed, "Lita had to practically kill herself just to beat me." During the match, Lita legitimately tore her left ACL after executing a Thesz press off the ring apron, leaving her unable to continue the match and resulting in a rushed finish, in which Stratus reclaimed the title.

Lita returned to WWE television in March 2005, mentoring Christy Hemme, who was in the midst of a storyline with Stratus that featured a title match between them at WrestleMania 21. Despite Lita's coaching, Hemme was defeated by Stratus. Lita continued to feud with Stratus by proxy over the following weeks, with Kane defeating Stratus's companion, Viscera, at Backlash on May 1.

==== Relationship with Edge and first retirement (2005–2006) ====
The relationship between Lita and Kane lasted until the May 16 episode of Raw, when Lita turned on Kane, helping Edge defeat him in the finals of the Raw Gold Rush Tournament, turning heel for the first and only time in her career. On the May 30 episode of Raw, Lita announced that she had filed for divorce, claiming Kane was like a 4th grader in the bedroom and expressing relief that she would no longer have to deal with his "sweaty body" and "stupid little laugh," and his wedding ring being flushed down a toilet. She then attempted to marry Edge on the June 20 episode of Raw, but the marriage ceremony was interrupted by a vengeful Kane, who emerged from beneath the ring, destroyed the ceremony, and as Edge and Lita escaped from the ring, Kane tombstoned their priest. The storyline with Kane ended shortly thereafter.

Off-screen, at this time, Dumas had been involved with Matt Hardy romantically, but began an affair with Adam Copeland (Edge), who was one of Hardy's closest friends. WWE then began to use the real-life issues between the three as an on-screen storyline. In April, Hardy was released from WWE for revealing the entire incident on his blog, only to be rehired several months later under constant outcry from fans from shows and pay-per-views every week for months on end. Lita had been one of the most popular performers in the WWE since the beginning of her association with the Hardy Boyz in 2000 and after Hardy was fired in April, her popularity had taken a massive dive. Starting with a Raw event at Madison Square Garden where after hobbling to the ring on a crutch to do a segment with heel Trish Stratus, she was booed heavily and fans chanted "You screwed Matt!" and "We want Matt!"- and Lita was still a face at this time. The booing and jeering got so bad that Stratus, angered by the abuse, went off script and berated the crowd; after the segment Dumas was shaken by the experience. Hardy was rehired in July (by which time Lita had turned heel) and would engage in a three-month feud with Edge, while Lita, awkwardly watching and sometimes interfering in these matches from ringside continued to act as Edge's valet. On the October 3 episode of Raw, Edge, with the assistance of Lita, defeated Hardy in a ladder match, and Hardy was obligated to leave Raw as a stipulation of the match, ending their feud. Hardy went to SmackDown!, and Edge defeated John Cena to win the WWE Championship on January 8 at New Year's Revolution.

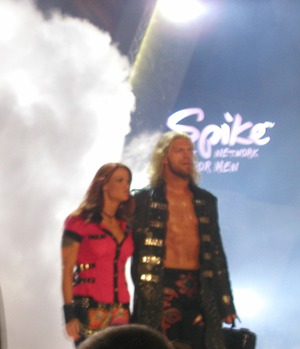
Edge and Lita in July 2005

In an interview conducted after the event, on WWE.com, Edge announced that he and Lita would have "hot, unbridled sex" in the middle of the ring on Raw the following night to celebrate his victory. On Raw that night in the family-friendly amusement park town of Hershey, Pennsylvania, Edge held up to that promise by engaging in foreplay with Lita in a bed inside the ring until they were interrupted by Ric Flair, who called Edge a disgrace and "that he was horrible in the sack." Flair, however, ended up on the receiving end of a con-chair-to on the announcers' table until Cena came out to Flair's aid and performed an FU on Lita. The "Live Sex Celebration" segment earned Raw a 5.2 rating, the highest Raw rating in over a year, leading Edge to call himself the "most watched champion ever". In 2021, Lita revealed that she was uncomfortable with the segment, but WWE threatened to fire her if she didn't do the segment. On the February 6 episode of Raw, Lita teamed with Edge in a loss to Cena and Maria. She continued to manage Edge into mid-2006, frequently interfering on his behalf during his feud with Mick Foley. In May 2006, Foley joined forces with Edge and Lita, with the trio defeating Foley's ECW rivals Terry Funk, Tommy Dreamer, and Beulah McGillicutty in an impromptu six-person tag team match at One Night Stand.

On the August 14 episode of Raw, Lita won her third Women's Championship by defeating Mickie James. She lost the title to longtime rival, Trish Stratus, at Unforgiven in Stratus's retirement match. At Cyber Sunday, Lita defeated James again in the finals of a tournament for the vacant Women's Title in a lumberjill match. In the three editions of Raw after Cyber Sunday, Lita faced James in three non-title handicap matches, the first where James had one hand tied behind her back, the second where James had her feet tied together, and the third with James being blindfolded. Lita easily won the first (November 6) and third (November 20) of those matches, but on the November 13 episode of Raw, James was able to defeat Lita after D-Generation X squirted mustard in Lita's face. By this time, Lita had become so fed up with the continued negative intrusion for 18 consecutive months WWE fans had on her personal life, that she cut a series of intense promos, with the normally relaxed Lita yelling and screaming into the microphone over her intense frustration of being treated the way she had been treated, insulting the crowd and the millions watching on TV. At Survivor Series, Lita lost the women's title to Mickie James in her last match before retiring, ending her 7-year tenure with WWE.

=== Return to the independent circuit (2007, 2017) ===
Dumas made her debut for United Wrestling Federation (UWF) on April 21, 2007, where she served as a special guest referee for the match between Christy Hemme and April Hunter. The following day, Dumas made her in-ring debut teaming up with Jerry Lynn in a winning effort defeating Austin Starr and Christy Hemme. Dumas made her debut for Family Wrestling Entertainment on the April 28 episode of FWE Television, as a special guest referee for the match where Winter retained the FWE Women's Championship against Melina Perez.

Lita made her in-ring return for the first time in five years as part of an eight-person tag match for MCW Pro Wrestling in Joppa, Maryland on March 3, 2017, where she teamed with The Bruiser, and The Hell Cats to defeat MCW champion Sean Studd, Andy Vineberg, Rayo and Jeremiah.

=== Return to World Wrestling Entertainment/WWE (2007–present) ===
==== Sporadic appearances (2007–2012) ====
Lita returned on December 10, 2007, on Raw's 15th Anniversary Special by teaming up with Trish Stratus to rid the ring of Jillian Hall, turning face for the first time since 2005. Later that night, she had a backstage reunion with Kane, her former on-screen husband.

She appeared on the November 1, 2010, episode of Raw in a segment with Pee-wee Herman. On December 12, 2011, Lita presented a Slammy Award to Kelly Kelly for Divalicious Moment of the Year.

Lita returned on the 1000th episode of Raw on July 23, 2012, defeating Heath Slater in an intergender no disqualification, no countout match with the help from the WWE legends who had defeated Slater during the past weeks, as well as the APA.

==== WWE Hall of Famer and various roles (2014–2018) ====
In 2014, she was inducted into the WWE Hall of Fame by her best friend and fellow wrestler Trish Stratus. The next night at WrestleMania XXX, she appeared during transmission while she was introduced as part of the 2014 Hall of Fame class.

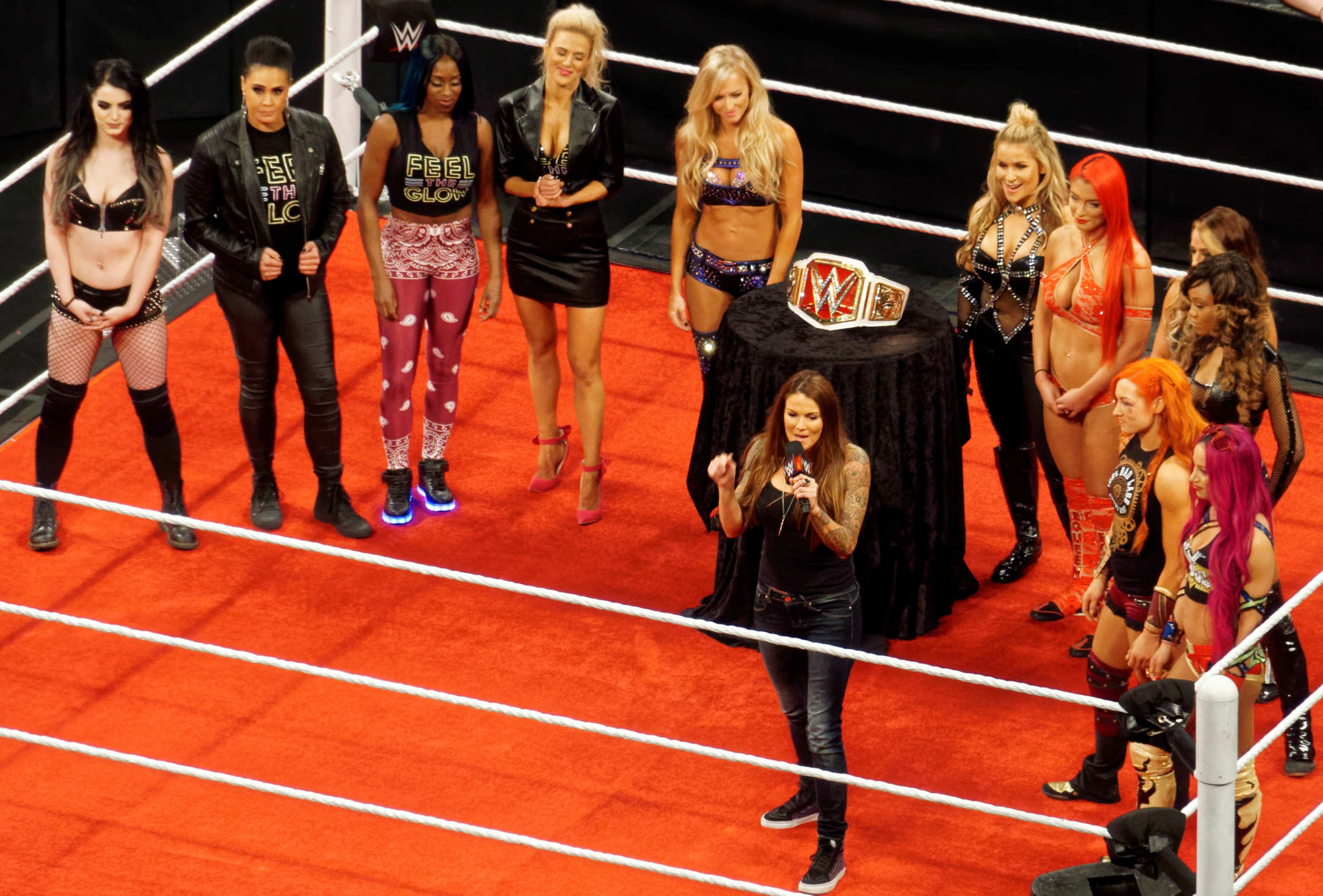
Lita presenting the WWE Women's Championship on Raw in April 2016

Lita served as a trainer on the sixth season of Tough Enough, alongside Booker T and Billy Gunn. She appeared on the July 13, 2015, episode of Raw to introduce the Tough Enough contestants. From October 2015 to July 2016, Dumas was a creative writer and backstage producer for the WWE on a full-time basis.

During the WrestleMania 32 pre-show on April 3, 2016, Lita announced the retirement of the WWE Divas Championship and unveiled the new WWE Women's Championship belt, being won by Charlotte. She was working as one of the pre-show hosts for Raw, SmackDown and pay-per-view events until 2017.

Lita appeared during the WrestleMania 33 pre-show on April 2, 2017. She was also color commentator for the first edition of the Mae Young Classic, alongside Jim Ross.

Lita participated in the first edition of the Women's Royal Rumble in 2018. She also wrestled at WWE Evolution, WWE's first all women's pay-per-view, where she and Trish Stratus defeated Mickie James and Alicia Fox following a brief feud.

==== Return and WWE Women's Tag Team Champion (2022–2023) ====
Ahead of her appearance in the 2022 edition of the Royal Rumble, Lita returned to SmackDown, as a face, which led to a confrontation with Charlotte Flair. At the event, Lita entered at #26 and eliminated former rival Mickie James before being eliminated by Flair. On January 31, 2022, on Raw, Lita challenged Becky Lynch to a match at Elimination Chamber for the Raw Women's Championship. At the event on February 19, Lita failed to win the title, but received a standing ovation after the match.

Ending a one-year hiatus, Lita returned to Raw on February 6, 2023, during a Steel Cage match between Lynch and Bayley. She proceeded to assault all three members of Damage CTRL (Bayley, Dakota Kai, and Iyo Sky) and giving Lynch the victory. On the February 27 episode of Raw, Lita would team with Lynch to defeat Kai and Sky for the WWE Women's Tag Team Championship after an assist from the returning Trish Stratus, giving Lita her first title reign since 2006. On March 6, Stratus, Lynch, and Lita challenged Damage CTRL to a six-woman tag team match at WrestleMania 39, where they were victorious. This was Lita's second WrestleMania match and first-ever win.

On April 10, 2023, Lita was scheduled to defend the WWE Women's Tag Team Championship on Raw against Liv Morgan and Raquel Rodriguez. However, Lita was assaulted just prior to the start of the show, with Trish Stratus teaming with Becky Lynch to defend the title on her behalf. Morgan pinned Stratus with a roll-up, costing Lita and Lynch the titles. Stratus then attacked Lynch following the match. On the following episode of Raw, Stratus revealed herself as Lita's attacker, citing frustration with Lita appearing as Lynch's sidekick and overall anger at her legacy seemingly being forgotten.

On the November 14, 2023, episode of NXT, Lita announced the qualifiers for the Iron Survivor Challenge at NXT Deadline.

== Legacy ==
Lita is cited as inspiration for several women, such as Paige, AJ Lee, Bayley, Liv Morgan, Deonna Purrazzo, Melina Perez, Taryn Terrell, Maria Kanellis, and Maryse.

Lita was involved in the first three Raw main events featuring women. She won all three matches—the first on July 31, 2000, in Atlanta being a mixed tag-team match pairing her and The Rock against Trish Stratus and Triple H, the second against Stephanie McMahon on August 21, 2000, with The Rock as the special guest referee in which she captured her first Women's Championship, and the third against Trish Stratus on December 6, 2004, where she won her second Women's Championship. This was the first time women had main-evented Raw where no men were involved in any capacity. In November 2003, she faced Victoria in the first-ever women's steel cage match in WWE.

WWE mentions Lita as "a Diva who always kept the WWE Universe on their toes. Whether she was flying high with The Hardy Boyz or shocking censors alongside Edge, the four-time Women's Champion knew how to elicit a reaction around the world."

Her Women's Championship match against Trish Stratus at Unforgiven 2006 was ranked No. 3 by WWE in 2015 on the "10 greatest Divas Matches of all time" list. This match is also cited as one of the most unforgettable Divas matches, along with her match against Mickie James at Survivor Series 2006, and against Victoria in a cage match on Raw.

== Music career ==
Dumas formed the band The Luchagors in mid-2006, and they debuted in September 2006 at the rock and wrestling event Rock-N-Shock at The Masquerade in Atlanta. Dumas wore a top emblazoned with the symbol of the band during her final match in WWE. The band released their self-titled debut CD, The Luchagors, on September 11, 2007.

Dumas contributed vocals to the song "From The Shadows" (appearing on the track alongside Dez Cadena of Black Flag/Misfits) from Recognise, the debut album from UK band JD & the FDCs, which was released in July 2012. A video for the song was released in March 2013.

== Other media ==
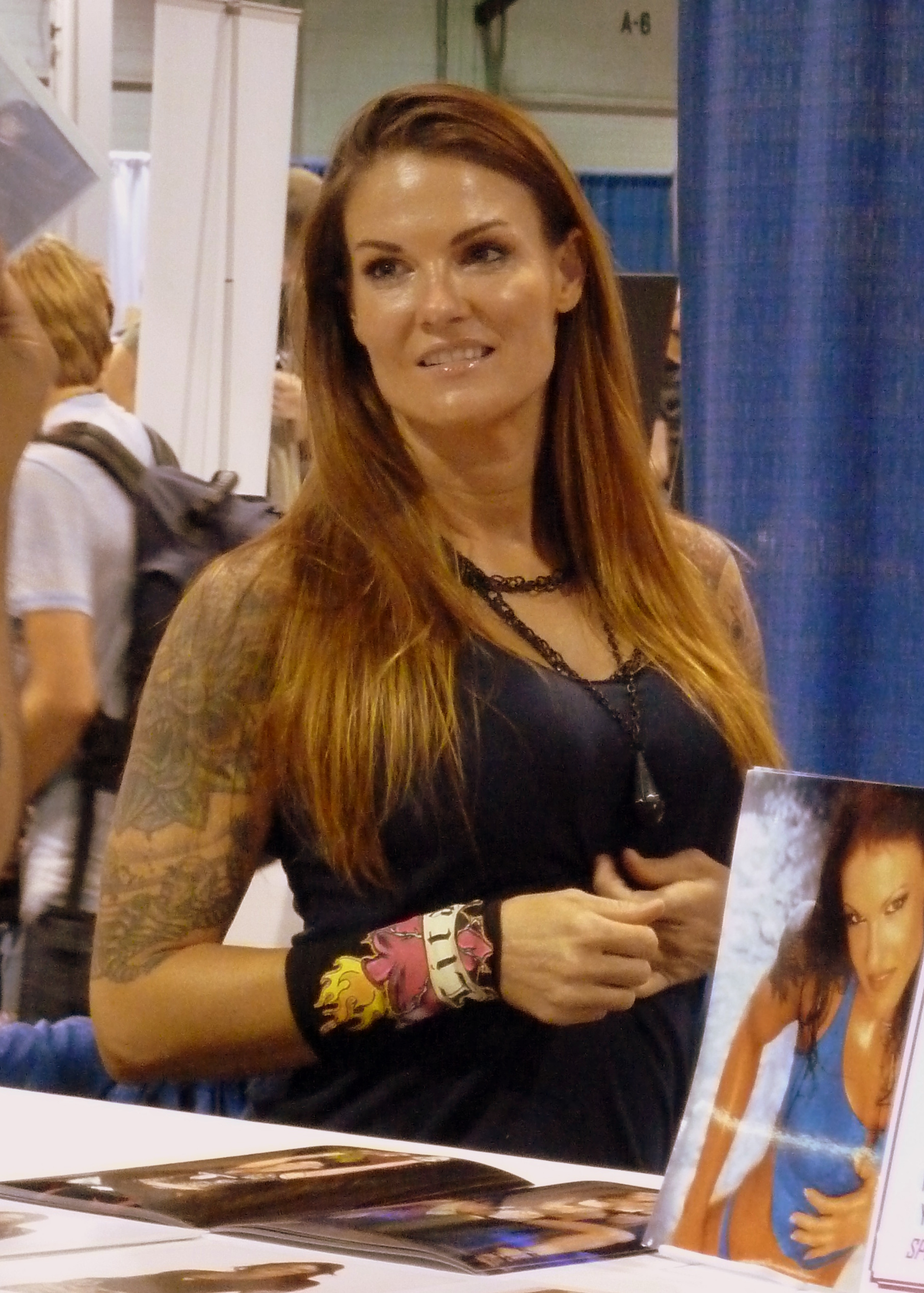
Lita signing autographs in March 2012

Lita was featured in the June 2001 video and DVD release Lita: It Just Feels Right. The video featured discussions of Lita's career to that point and showcased several of her matches. Dumas's autobiography, written with Michael Krugman, Lita: A Less Traveled R.O.A.D. – The Reality of Amy Dumas was released on September 16, 2003. The book covered topics such as her family, childhood years, wrestling career, relationship with Matt Hardy, and her neck surgery and subsequent rehabilitation. Lita is considered to be a sex symbol.

Dumas also appeared on a variety of television shows including the season finale of Dark Angel, Fear Factor,The Weakest Link's "WWF Superstars Edition", and as a presenter at the MTV Asia Awards 2002 in 2002. In 2004, she appeared on an episode of Headbangers Ball.

Lita began hosting a local Atlanta radio show called Amy's Discordia in 2013.

Lita was interviewed and profiled for the 2016 Nine Legends movie.

On May 9, 2018, Dumas debuted as the host of a series for the ASY TV web platform titled The UFO Sho where she visits UFO-themed locations and examines the culture around them.

In 2019, Dumas appeared on The Special Without Brett Davis during WrestleMania week.

In March 2020, Dumas, along with Christy Hemme and Gail Kim, announced "KAYfABE," a new wrestling show which was inspired by true events and was to blend scripted drama with pro wrestling. The production launched a crowd-funding campaign on Kickstarter to raise money for the pilot episode, however they were only able to raise $62,919.96 of the $400,000 goal. Following the failure of the campaign, the team cited the financial impacts of the global COVID-19 pandemic as a reason for the campaign's difficulties and assured fans that the show would secure funding elsewhere at a later date.

On November 18, 2020, Lita made an appearance on a TV show along with Tatiana Suarez of the UFC on The Bachelorette.

Lita also joined Booker T and Mick Foley as a co-host of WWE Studios' A&E reality series WWE's Most Wanted Treasures about searches for collectibles related to various wrestlers for its second season in 2023.

== Filmography ==
Film and television
Year	Title	Role	Notes
2001	WWF Divas: In Hedonism	Self; guest	Direct to DVD
2001	Open Mike with Mike Bullard	Self; guest	1 episode
2001	Live & Kicking	Self; guest	1 episode
2001	Lita: It Just Feels Right	Self; feature	Direct to DVD
2001	WWE: Hardy Boyz - Leap of Faith	Self; feature	Direct to DVD
2001	The Howard Stern Show	Self; guest	1 episode
2001	WWE Tough Enough season 1	Self; guest	1 episode
2001	SM:TV Live	Self; guest	1 episode
2001	The Weakest Link	Self; contestant	1 episode
2001-2002	The Big Breakfast	Self; guest	2 episodes
2002	Fear Factor	Self; contestant	1 episode
2002	Dark Angel	Thula	1 episode
2002	WWE Confidential	Self; guest	1 episode
2002	Before They Were WWE Superstars	Self; feature	Documentary
2002	WWE Divas: Tropical Pleasure	Self; feature	Direct to DVD
2003	WWE: Trish Stratus - 100% Stratusfaction	Self; guest	Direct to DVD
2004	Headbangers Ball	Self; guest	1 episode
2004	WWE Divas: South of the Border	Self; feature	Direct to DVD
2005	WWE Viva Las Divas	Self; feature	Direct to DVD
2005	WWE Hall of Fame 2005	Self; audience member	TV special
2005	WWE Byte This!	Self; guest	2 episodes
2006	WWE Divas Do New York	Self; feature	Direct to DVD
2006	WWE Hall of Fame 2006	Self; audience member	TV special
2012	You Think You Know Me? The Story of Edge	Self; feature	Documentary
2012	WWE: CM Punk - Best in the World	Self; feature	Documentary
2013	WWE Hall of Fame 2013	Self; audience member	TV special
2014	WWE Hall of Fame 2014	Self; inductee	TV special
2014	Talk is Jericho	Self; guest	Podcast, 1 episode
2014	The Lost Journals of Huey Williams	Self; cameo	Short film
2014	WWE Rivalries	Self; feature	2 episodes
2014	The Monday Night War: WWE vs. WCW	Self; feature	Documentary, 5 episodes
2015	Unfiltered with Renee Young	Self; guest	Podcast, 1 episode
2015-2022	WWE 24	Self; guest	3 episodes
2016	Nine Legends	Self; feature	Documentary
2016	RAW Talk	Self; guest	1 episode
2016	WWE Story Time	Self; guest	1 episode
2017	Svengoolie	Self; guest	1 episode
2017-2018	Table for 3	Self; feature	2 episodes
2018	WWE Hall of Fame 2018	Self; audience member	TV special
2018	WWE Playback	Self; feature	1 episode
2018	Then, Now, Forever: Evolution of WWE's Women's Division	Self; feature	Documentary
2019	The Special without Brett Davis	Self; guest	1 episode
2019	WWE: Trish and Lita: Best Friends, Better Enemies	Self; feature	Documentary
2019	It Wants Blood!	Delilah Bastine	
2020	The Bachelorette	Self; guest	1 episode
2020	WWE Ruthless Aggression	Self; feature	Documentary, 3 episodes
2020	Planet Scum Presents: The 10th Annual Sandwich Night	Self; guest	TV special
2020-2022	After the Bell with Corey Graves	Self; guest	Podcast, 2 episodes
2022	WWE's the Bump	Self; guest	1 episode
2022	Steve Austin's Broken Skull Sessions	Self; guest	1 episode
2022	Out in the Ring	Self; guest	Special thanks
2022-2026	WWE Rivals	Self; feature	3 episodes
2023-2024	WWE's Most Wanted Treasures	Self; co-host	11 episodes
2023-2024	Biography: WWE Legends	Self; feature	5 episodes
2025	WWE Legends Profiles	Self; feature	1 episode
2025	WWE's Greatest Moments	Self; feature	2 episodes

WWE video games
Year	Title	Notes
2000	WWF No Mercy	Video game debut
2000	WWF SmackDown! 2: Know Your Role	
2001	WWF SmackDown! Just Bring It	
2001	WWF With Authority!	
2002	WWF Raw	
2002	WWE WrestleMania X8	
2002	WWE SmackDown! Shut Your Mouth	
2003	WWE Crush Hour	
2003	WWE WrestleMania XIX	
2003	WWE Raw 2	
2003	WWE SmackDown! Here Comes The Pain	
2004	WWE SmackDown! vs. RAW	Removed, unplayable
2005	WWE WrestleMania 21	
2005	WWE SmackDown! vs. Raw 2006	
2006	WWE SmackDown vs. Raw 2007	
2012	WWE '13	
2013	WWE 2K14	
2014	WWE SuperCard	Mobile game
2015	WWE 2K16	Downloadable content
2016	WWE 2K17	
2017	WWE 2K18	
2017	WWE Champions	Mobile game
2017	WWE Mayhem	Mobile game
2018	WWE 2K19	
2019	WWE 2K20	
2019	WWE Universe	
2020	WWE 2K Battlegrounds	Downloadable content
2023	WWE 2K23	
2024	WWE 2K24	
2025	WWE 2K25	
2026	WWE 2K26	Cover athlete of Attitude Era special edition

== Personal life ==
Dumas is a known animal lover and vegan. In 2003, she founded the animal charity Amy Dumas Operation Rescue and Education (A.D.O.R.E.).

Dumas's hair is naturally brown, although she has dyed it red throughout her WWF/E career. She has a wide variety of tattoos: a three-eyed green gargoyle on her upper right bicep, the word "Punk" on the inside of her lower lip, and the word "rebel" (Russian: бунтарь) written in Russian Cyrillic letters on her lower back neck, all of which she got in the 1990s. In 2007, she acquired a sleeve on her left arm, featuring Mexican skulls, one of which has the band 7 Seconds' logo on its forehead. She previously had two piercings in her tongue and another two in her nose.

In 1999, Dumas began dating Matt Hardy. They first met in January 1999 at a NWA Mid-Atlantic show, and began dating a few months later. In February 2005, it was revealed that Dumas had been romantically involved with fellow wrestler Adam Copeland for several months while still in a relationship with Hardy, who had been at home recovering from a knee injury. Following a public revelation of the affair, Matt Hardy was released by WWE. Hardy was rehired several months later and the real-life situation was translated into a storyline.

Dumas dated fellow band member Shane Morton from 2006 to 2008. Dumas also dated CM Punk from 2009 to 2010, and then again from late 2012 to September 2013.

After retiring from wrestling in 2009, Dumas bought a house in Nicaragua and splits her time between her home in Atlanta and her house in Nicaragua, where she enjoys surfing.

Dumas was arrested on December 9, 2011, in Columbia County, Georgia, for speeding and driving with a suspended license. After one night in jail, Dumas was released on a bail bond posted at $2,200.

== Championships and accomplishments ==
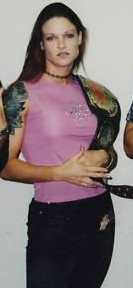
Lita is a four-time WWF/WWE Women's Champion.

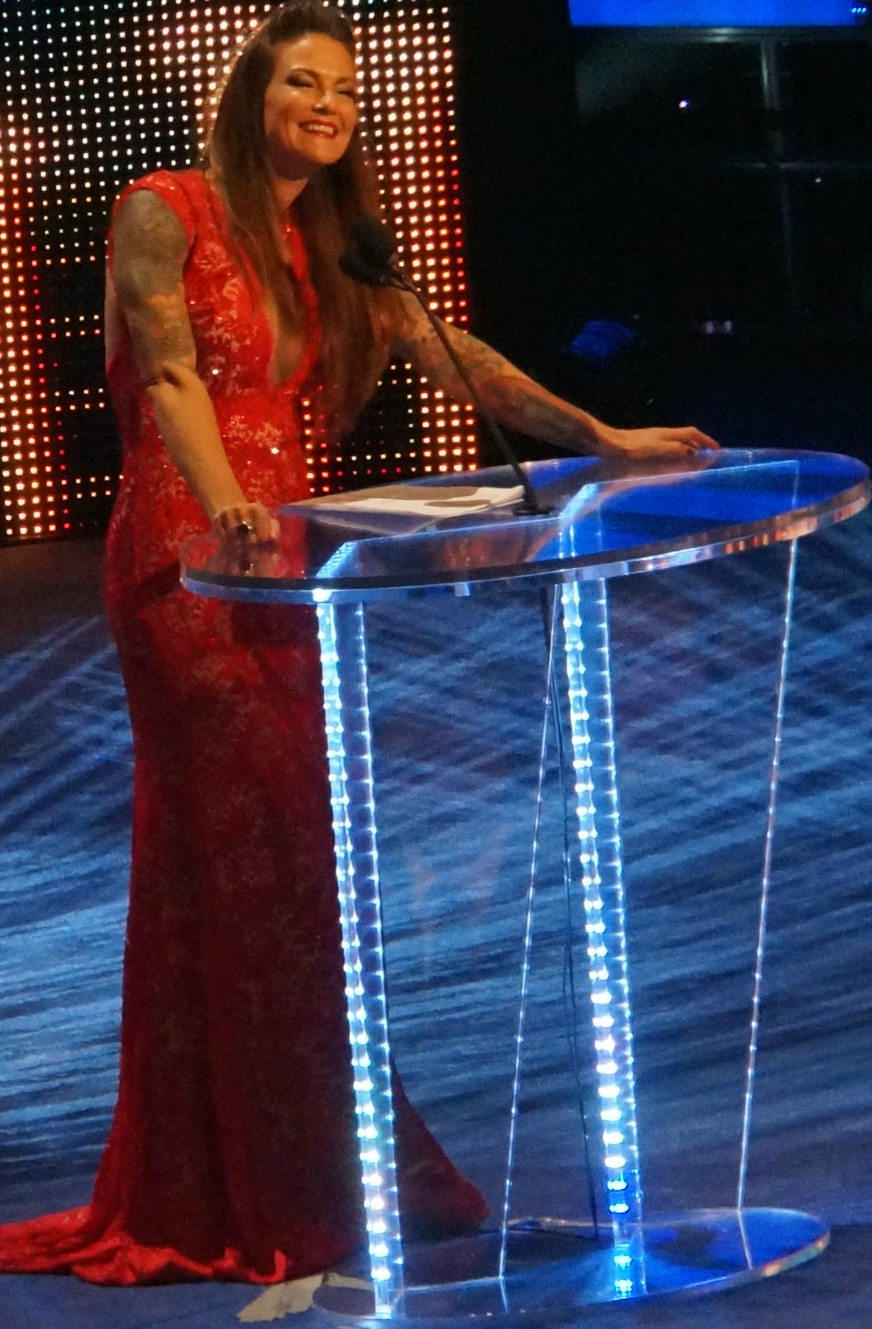
Lita during her speech of induction at the WWE Hall of Fame in April 2014

- American Chronicles
  - Female of the Year (2006)
- Bleacher Report
  - Ranked No. 49 of the top 50 Greatest WWE Superstars of All Time (2024)
- Complex.com
  - Ranked No. 45 of the top 50 Greatest WWE Wrestlers of All Time (2024)
- Digital Spy
  - In August 2020, Digital Spy held a World Cup tournament to discover the greatest female WWE wrestler of all time. Lita was declared the winner from a list of 32 female wrestlers.
- Diva Dirt
  - Woman of the Decade (2009)
  - Greatest Raw Diva Ever (2012)
  - Raw's New Diva of the Decade (2013)
  - Wrestling's Greatest Couple (2014) with Edge
  - Best Ladder Moment (2014) — Lita hurricanranas Christian off ladder (Unforgiven, 2000)
  - Legacy Award (2015)
- IGN
  - Ranked No. 39 of the top 50 WWE Wrestlers of All Time (2017)
- ONE37pm
  - Ranked No. 22 of the 30 Best WWE Wrestlers of All Time (2023)
- Pro Wrestling Illustrated
  - Feud of the Year (2005) with Edge vs. Matt Hardy
  - Woman of the Year (2001)
- Pro Wrestling Report
  - Diva of the Year (2006)
- Rolling Stone
  - Hot List (2001) with the Hardy Boyz
- Sports Illustrated
  - Ranked No. 93 of the top 101 Wrestlers of All Time (2016)
- The New York Times
  - The New York Times Best Seller list (2003) — Lita: A Less Traveled R.O.A.D. – The Reality of Amy Dumas
- World Wrestling Federation / Entertainment / WWE
  - WWF/E Women's Championship (4 times)
  - WWE Women's Tag Team Championship (1 time) — with Becky Lynch
  - Women's Championship Tournament (2006)
  - WWE Hall of Fame (Class of 2014)
  - Breakout Performer of the Year (WWF Magazine Best of 2000)
  - Diva of the Year (WWF Magazine Best of 2001)
  - Inaugural Female WWE Draft Pick (2002 WWF Draft Lottery)
  - Lita's finisher, the "Litasault", was ranked No. 35 of the 50 Greatest Finishing Moves in WWE History (2012)
  - WWE Countdown (2014)
    - Greatest High Flyers: #3
    - Hottest Couples: #1 — with Edge
    - Most Dangerous Divas: #1
- Wrestling Observer Newsletter
  - Worst Feud of the Year (2004) with Matt Hardy vs. Kane

== See also ==
- Women in WWE
- Women's professional wrestling

== Bibliography ==
- Amy Dumas; Michael Krugman (2003). Lita: A Less Traveled R.O.A.D – The Reality of Amy Dumas. WWE Books. ISBN 0-7434-7399-X.
- Ian Hamilton (2006). Wrestling's Sinking Ship: What Happens to an Industry Without Competition. Lulu.com. ISBN 1-4116-1210-8.
- Pat McNeill (2002). The Tables All Were Broken: McNeill's Take on the End of Professional Wrestling. iUniverse. ISBN 0-595-22404-0.
- Scott Keith (2004). Wrestling's One Ring Circus: The Death of the World Wrestling Federation. Citadel Press. ISBN 0-8065-2619-X.
