= White Hidden Fire =

Song by Weird Owl

from the album Nuclear Psychology
- Released: February 2007
- Genre: Psychedelic rock; doom metal
- Length: 7:03
- Label: Self-released
- Songwriter: Weird Owl

"White Hidden Fire" is a song written and performed by the American psychedelic rock band Weird Owl, from their 2007 EP Nuclear Psychology. The track is one of Weird Owl's most well-known songs, and has been noted for its "catchy and chill out atmosphere".

== Personnel ==
Weird Owl

- Trevor Tyrrell – guitar, lead vocals
- Jon Rudd – guitar
- Kenneth Cook – bass guitar, keyboards, synths, back-up vocals
- Sean Reynolds – drums
- John Cassidy – keyboards, synths

Additional production

- Gerard Garone – recording
- Harley Zinger – recording
