= Kim Rosen =

Kim Rosen may refer to:

- Kim Rosen (engineer), audio engineer
- Kimberley Rosen, state senator in Maine, United States
