= The Luchagors (album) =

Studio album by The Luchagors
- Released: September 11, 2007
- Recorded: January–March 2007
- Genres: Pop rock, punk rock
- Length: 31:04
- Label: self-released
- Producer: Rachel Bolan

The Luchagors is the only studio album by American punk rock band The Luchagors fronted by professional wrestler Amy Dumas, known professionally as Lita, and her then boyfriend Shane Morton. It was released on compact disc and digitally through their official website on September 11, 2007.

== Background ==
Dumas planned to attend a rock and roll benefit show in Atlanta and upon being pressed by friends towards making music, she had responded "I couldn't come up with a good enough excuse not to. So I just went for it." Taking the prompts from her friends, she began working with Shane Morton, who was in a relationship with Dumas. Together, they wrote all of the music for the album, which was done primarily on acoustic guitar and in the home of Dumas, particularly on her couch. The Luchagors went into the studio to begin recording in January 2007, and on March 17, 2007, Dumas announced that the band had finished recording all the music for The Luchagors. It was produced by bass player of Skid Row Rachel Bolan, who during the recording and mixing had guided the band and helped with their musical direction. The cover art for the album was made by Morton, which has been likened to the artwork found in DC Comics. The Luchagors has explicit lyrics, and the song "All There Is" features spoken word in the form of a manifesto. "Daddy's Girl" has been called pastiche of the music of Holly and the Italians, and their song "March of the Luchagors" was written as an anthem for their fans. Although some of the songs off of the album are dynamic and aggressive like "White Boy" and "Bastard", The Luchagors has songs that are lyrically geared towards conveying a message; the song "Crazy World" was written for people dissatisfied with society, and aims to motivate them towards changing it. The music has been described as being pop rock and punk, and has been compared to the music of The Ramones, as well as The Misfits. The Luchagors was released independently on September 11, 2007, and appeared for purchase from their official site, as well as in compact disc, and through iTunes. In an interview with Miriam Ramirez of The Monitor, Dumas said of the album "every member has put their heart and soul into the record". After moderate success and positive feedback, The Luchagors was distributed internationally in Europe.

=== Supporting tour ===
By the spring of 2007, The Luchagors were ready to tour in order to support the release of their album The Luchagors, which began locally in early July 2007. They toured throughout the U.S., as well as in several European venues, such as Belfast, Madrid, and in Leeds. However, in August 2007 and amidst touring, the original and recording drummer Troy King left the band, and had returned by October 2007. On the continuing tour he was replaced by Racci Shay in early 2009.

== Reception ==
Professional ratings
Review scores
Source	Rating
Allmusic	(favorable)

The Luchagors has received positive reviews, and has been called "rip-snortin’, candy-coated blast of jumpy, insanely catchy punk rock" by Jeff Clark of Stomp and Stammer. Stewart Mason of Allmusic said of the album that it is an "easily digestible blend of ramalama bubble-punk" and went on to say that they are "the sort of semi-ironic trash culture celebrations first pioneered by the Ramones. Wonka Vision views The Luchagors superior in comparison to other wrestling stars' albums and gave it a (3/5), stating that the "band’s songwriting tapers off a bit, but overall maintains the feeling of a decent, but dated, punk sound."

== Track listing ==
No.	Title	Length
1.	"White Boy"	2:49
2.	"Miracle"	2:22
3.	"All There Is"	3:08
4.	"Already Gone"	3:27
5.	"Burn"	2:47
6.	"Daddy's Girl"	2:43
7.	"Goodbye"	3:35
8.	"Janice"	3:04
9.	"Bastard"	3:08
10.	"Crazy World"	2:30
11.	"March of the Luchagors"	1:53
Total length:		31:04

Information on track listing.

== Personnel ==
- Amy Dumas – vocals
- Jay Hedberg – bass
- Troy King – drums
- Shane Morton – guitar

Information on personnel.

== Sources ==
- Monroe, Doug (June 2007). "Amy's Big Adventure". Atlanta. 47 (2). Emmis Communications. ISSN 0004-6701.
