= Michael McArthur =

American singer-songwriter

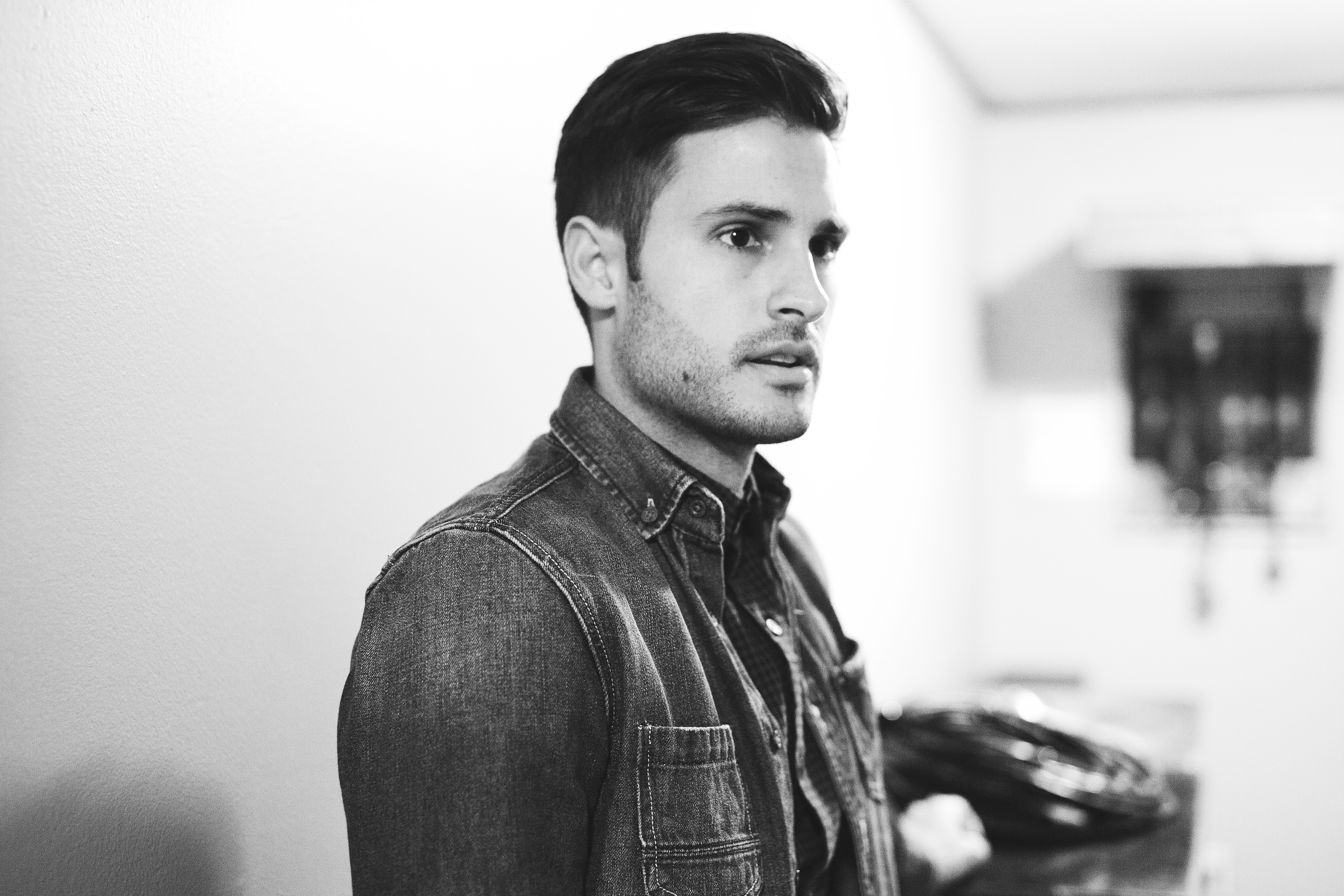
- McArthur in December 2013

Background information
- Birth name: Michael Anthony McArthur
- Born: Lakeland, Florida, U.S.
- Genres: Folk, soul, alternative rock, Americana
- Occupation(s): Singer-songwriter, record producer
- Instruments: Guitar, vocals, piano, percussion, harmonica, Martin guitar
- Years active: 2008–present
- Labels: Dark River Records
- Website: michaelmcarthurmusic.com

Michael Anthony McArthur is an American singer-songwriter, guitarist, and record producer.

== Early life ==
Michael Anthony McArthur was born and raised in Lakeland, Florida, and is one of four children. His father, Robert McArthur, is a retired retail store manager, and his mother, Yvonne Robinson, is a retired registered nurse. He began singing in elementary school, and, at age 15, his grandfather gave him his first guitar. McArthur began writing songs and making home demo recordings shortly after. In 2004, at age 19, he co-founded a company with his brother, Chris McArthur, and in 2006, the company opened Black and Brew Coffee House and Bistro in Lakeland's downtown. In late 2008, McArthur decided to sell his ownership in the family business and pursue a career in music.

== Career ==
In August 2012, McArthur independently released his first album, The Year of You and Me, a 5-track EP he recorded at The Vanguard Room in Lakeland, Florida.

In April 2013, McArthur was named the Florida GRAMMY Showcase Award Winner by The Recording Academy's Florida chapter.

In October 2013, McArthur independently released his second album, The Home Recordings, a 5-track EP composed of acoustic versions of the songs from his first EP. McArthur recorded, produced, engineered, and mixed the album at his home studio in Lakeland, Florida.

In April 2015, McArthur independently released his third album, Magnolia, a 6-track EP. The album was produced by McArthur, along with Conrad Johnson and David Bianco, a 1996 winner of the "Grammy Award for Best Engineered Album, Non-Classical." Magnolia received numerous positive reviews. The album was officially released at an album release party at "Polk Theatre" on April 10, 2015.

In March 2016, McArthur released a single recording, "Goodbye Lover," which was recorded and produced by Greg Wells at Rocket Carousel studio in Los Angeles, CA. "Goodbye Lover" received a positive review from Huffington Post critic Morena Duwe.

Five days after the 2016 shooting at Pulse Nightclub in Orlando, Florida, McArthur released a music video as a tribute to the victims of the attack. The video was based upon McArthur's song, "Love Wins," which had previously been unreleased. The video was primarily filmed at a victim support rally in downtown Orlando, but also includes still images and videos from around the world of people coming together in support of Orlando. McArthur originally wrote the song after the United States Supreme Court ruling on same-sex marriage in the United States.

In January 2017, McArthur released his single, "Fantasy Woman," which was also recorded and produced by Greg Wells.

In August 2017, McArthur independently released For Elaine, a 10-track acoustic compilation album. McArthur recorded, produced, engineered, and mixed the album at his home studio in Lakeland, Florida.

In February 2018, McArthur formed his own record label, Dark River Records.

On January 25, 2019, McArthur released his debut full-length album and first release on Dark River Records, Ever Green, Ever Rain. The album was produced by multiple-Grammy winning producer, Ryan Freeland and recorded in four days at United Recording Studios on Sunset Boulevard in Hollywood, California. The band consisted of McArthur, Steven Nistor, Paul Bryan, Lee Pardini (of the band Dawes), Jebin Bruni, Josh Davis, and Dan Kalisher. The album was mastered by Kim Rosen. 'Ever Green, Ever Rain' has received numerous positive reviews including that from Billboard, Cowboys & Indians, popmatters, Atwood Magazine, Americana UK, Glide Magazine, and The Bluegrass Situation.

In the summer of 2020, McArthur released two EPs on Dark River Records. Oh, Sedona was released on July 3 and How to Fall in Love was released on August 14. Both were recorded in isolation from April 14–16 and feature one-take solo acoustic performances. McArthur produced, engineered, recorded, performed, and mixed all songs on the two EPs. Oh, Sedona includes a cover of Prince's Purple Rain.

== Musical style ==
His musical style encompasses rock, soul, americana and folk.

== Touring ==
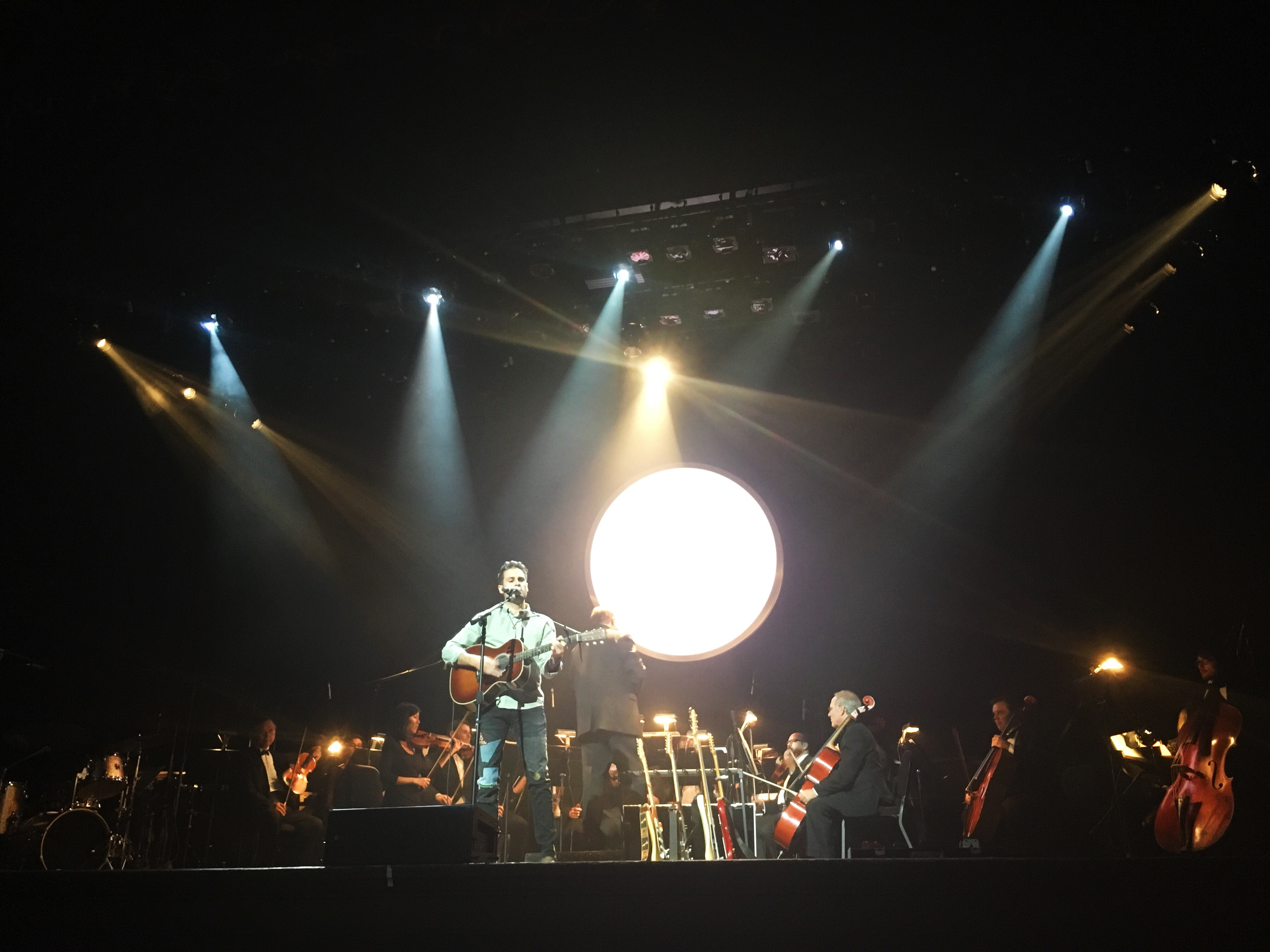
Michael McArthur with the Imperial Symphony Orchestra at The Polk Theatre, September 10, 2016

McArthur spent much of 2016 traveling the country playing intimate solo acoustic shows in fans' homes. In September 2016, he performed with his full band, and the Imperial Symphony Orchestra, at the Polk Theatre in Lakeland.

== Discography ==
=== Studio albums ===
- Ever Green, Ever Rain (2019)
- Milky Stars (2022)

=== Extended plays ===
- The Year of You and Me (2012)
- The Home Recordings (2013)
- Magnolia (2015)
- Oh, Sedona (2020)
- How to Fall in Love (2020)

=== Compilations ===
- For Elaine (2017)

=== Singles ===
- "Goodbye Lover" (2016)
- "Fantasy Woman" (2017)
