= Build Your Beast a Fire =

Studio album by Weird Owl
- Released: July 26, 2011
- Genre: Psychedelic rock
- Length: 42:26
- Label: Tee Pee Records

Weird Owl chronology
Ever the Silver Cord Be Loosed (2009)	Build Your Beast a Fire (2011)	Healing (2013)

Build Your Beast a Fire is the second studio album by the American psychedelic rock band Weird Owl, released on July 26, 2011 by Tee Pee Records. The album was released following their 2009 album Ever the Silver Cord Be Loosed.

== Recording ==
The initial recording of the album was completed at Verdant Studio in Vermont with Justin Pizzoferrato, followed by further recording and mixing at the Drawing Room in Kingston, New York with Justin Rice. Trevor Tyrrell, guitarist and lead vocalist for Weird Owl, when asked about lyrical inspirations for the album, stated that "While the lyrics do bear some allusion to certain occult practices, I also feel a kinship on a visceral and primordial level: the act of watching fire and rejoicing in both its creative and destructive power. The manner of singing resembles a chant that might be heard at some sort of shamanistic rite held on the moon long ago." Tyrrell said this of the album overall:

The album is part magical, part scientific; part futuristic, part ancient; part muscular, part psychological; part heavenly and part terrestrial. It dwells perfectly in a universe of its own creation.

== Critical reception ==
Professional ratings
Review scores
Source	Rating
The A.V. Club	B+

Steven Hyden of The A.V. Club gave the album a positive review, writing that the album's songs were "tighter and more melodic" than those of Weird Owl's previous endeavors, noting that Build Your Beast a Fire "[takes] cues from Hawkwind, early Pink Floyd, and Deep Purple's 'Space Truckin''", and stating that it gives Weird Owl's "psychedelic explorations a newfound sense of purpose". Julian Woolsey of the website Rock Edition wrote that the album "flows like a classic Floyd or Spirit album, with alchemical themes, pastoral interludes, synthesizer experiments, and explosions of rock".

Christopher Weingarten of The Village Voice wrote that the album "has a cosmic lilt and smoky churn, somewhere between ritual and choogle".

== Track listing ==
No.	Title	Length
1.	"No Time Nor No Space"	1:13
2.	"Up From The Root"	3:47
3.	"Straj Proj"	3:53
4.	"Tiny Sleeping Animals"	1:41
5.	"Mirrors in the Mud"	5:13
6.	"Parallax Eyes"	3:48
7.	"Build Your Beast A Fire II"	0:49
8.	"Saucer-Shaped Shadow"	2:12
9.	"Skin The Dawn"	4:34
10.	"Two-Headed Brother"	3:36
11.	"Horn Antler Tusk"	1:10
12.	"Mountains On Top Of Buried Stars"	5:37
13.	"Space Bolero"	1:05
14.	"What We See What We Know"	1:37
15.	"Build Your Beast A Fire I"	2:11
Total length:		42:26

== Personnel ==
- Trevor Tyrrell – guitar, lead vocals
- Jon Rudd – guitar
- Kenneth Cook – bass guitar, keyboards, synths, back-up vocals
- Sean Reynolds – drums
- John Cassidy – keyboards, synths
