= Interstellar Skeletal =

Studio album by Weird Owl
- Released: May 25, 2015
- Genre: Psychedelic rock
- Length: 43:53
- Label: A Recordings, Ltd.

Weird Owl chronology
Healing (2013)	Interstellar Skeletal (2015)

Interstellar Skeletal is the fourth studio album by the American psychedelic rock band Weird Owl, released by A Recordings, Ltd. on May 25, 2015. The album was ranked as the 11th best psychedelic record of 2015 by Redefine magazine.

== Recording ==
Trevor Tyrrell, guitarist and lead vocalist for Weird Owl, stated in an interview with Decibel that "This was the first time our personnel remained unchanged between records, so it allowed us to push the sounds and visions we started to establish with Healing even farther toward some odd starry coordinates".

The album's cover art was designed by Tyrrell, who wanted for the cover to be "abstract and unlike stereotypical psych album art", stating that "I wanted our album to look like it was from some time and some dimension completely unknown to the audience, and I wanted it to represent the cosmic psychic template (or skeleton) of the material universe".

== Reception ==
Professional ratings
Review scores
Source	Rating
AllMusic	3.5/5 stars

Dave Cromwell of The Deli wrote that, throughout the album, "the band covers an extensive range of neo-psychedelia, post-rock and alternative/indie", and called the song "God" the album's highlight track. Nic Smith, writing for SLUG Magazine, said that the album's "tracks are prone to suddenly diving into heavy riffs that inject energy and purpose back into their weightless soundscapes", and concluded his review by saying that "This record is a nice change of scenery, if you're in the mood for a cosmic comedown".

The album was named the 11th best psychedelic album of 2015 by Redefine magazine, with writer Thad McKraken stating that Weird Owl "doesn’t do anything particularly well, and yet, it’s somehow arranged with such a concise precision that it rules". In regards to Weird Owl's discography, Jeff Treppel of Decibel called the album "the finest LP of their career".

== Track listing ==
No.	Title	Length
1.	"Interstellar Skeletal"	2:19
2.	"Silver Ziggurats"	3:32
3.	"God"	6:35
4.	"Split from the Sun"	4:26
5.	"Fine Vibrations"	8:16
6.	"White Werewolf"	6:43
7.	"Flying Fortress"	6:19
8.	"You Are a Spacecraft"	5:01
9.	"Interstellar Skeletal II"	0:42
Total length:		43:53

== Personnel ==
- Trevor Tyrrell – guitar, lead vocals
- Jon Rudd – guitar
- Kenneth Cook – bass guitar, keyboards, synths, back-up vocals
- Sean Reynolds – drums
- John Cassidy – keyboards, synths
