= The Luchagors =

US musical group

- Origin: Atlanta, Georgia, United States
- Genres: Punk rock, alternative metal
- Years active: 2006–2014
- Label: Hellcat Records
- Members: Amy Dumas; Shane Morton; Jay Hedberg; Racci Shay
- Past members: Troy King

The Luchagors was an American punk rock band based in Atlanta, Georgia, United States. It was fronted by Amy Dumas, better known as Lita to professional wrestling fans of World Wrestling Entertainment (WWE). During her match at WWE's Survivor Series 2006, against Mickie James, Dumas wore a Luchagors T-shirt.

== History ==
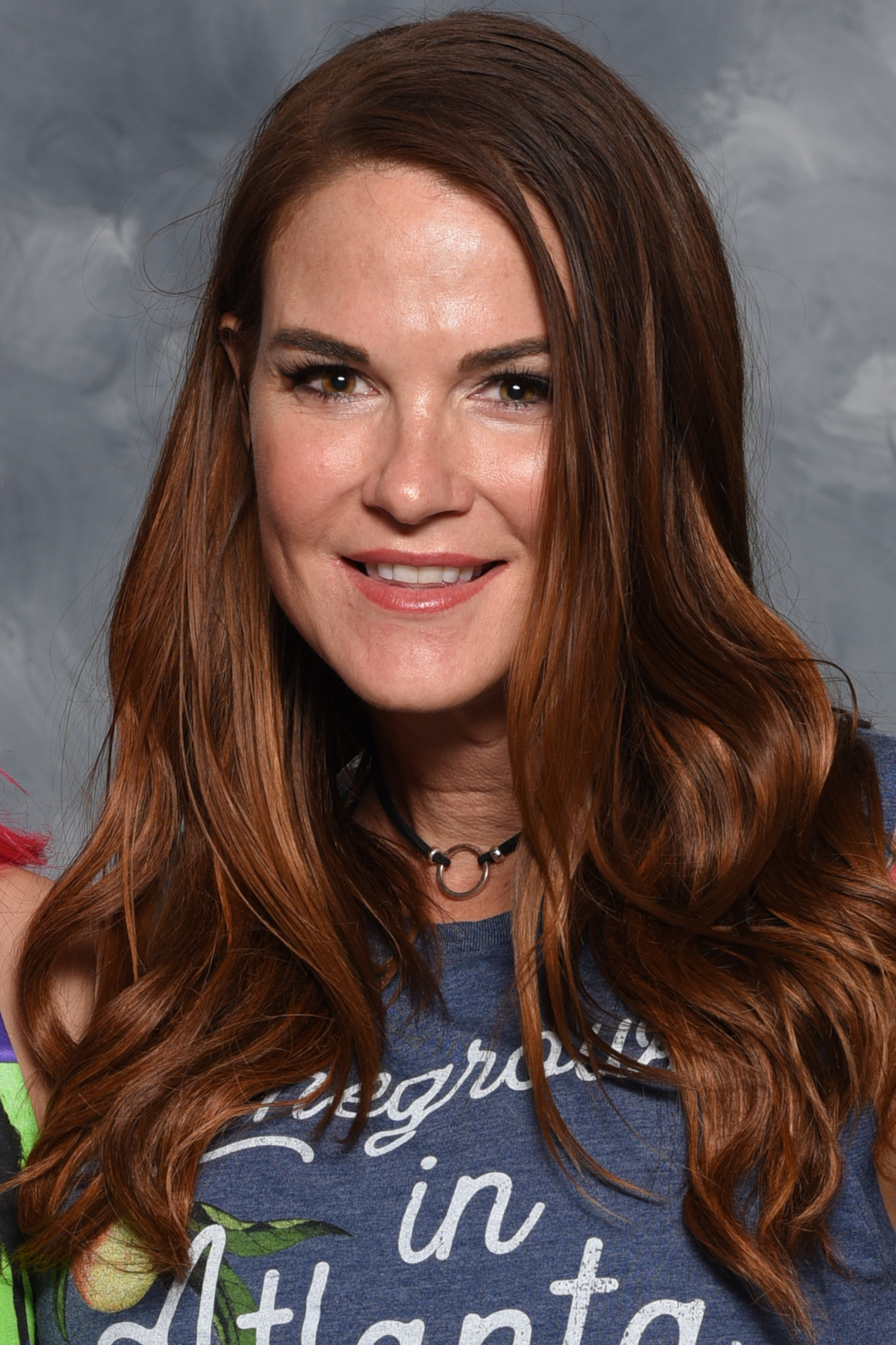
Luchagors frontwoman Amy Dumas in 2017

The name Luchagors is an homage to the term Luchador, a Lucha libre performer. Dumas performed this style early in her professional wrestling career. It is combined with the word gore, as in horror films, of which Amy Dumas and Shane Morton are fans. The band started out playing small gigs in and around the Atlanta area. The band's world premiere show was at the Rock-n-Shock event, which was held at the Masquerade in Atlanta, Georgia on September 14, 2006. The event took place to honor Sean Shocker.

In early 2007, they began recording their debut album, which was produced by Skid Row bassist Rachel Bolan. They finished recording the tracks for their album on March 17, 2007. In August 2007, an original member of the group, their drummer Troy King, left the band. Their self-titled debut album, The Luchagors, was released physically and as a download through online outlets on September 11. By October, however, Troy decided to stay with the band. Following the release of the album, the Luchagors went on a massive tour which was to promote the album. The Luchagors hired Rick Dunsford to book multiple US tours. In 2010 The Luchagors played Minerva Music Festival.

In 2014, Amy Dumas stated in multiple interviews that the band was finished at the moment due to an unsuccessful tour in the UK. There was no update on the band's second album following this announcement. The Luchagors played their last show together on July 31, 2014 at The Drunken Unicorn in Atlanta, Georgia.

== Band members ==
- Amy Dumas (vocals)
- Shane Morton (guitar, vocals)
- Jay Hedberg (bass guitar, vocals)
- Racci Shay (drums)
- Troy King (drums)

== Discography ==
- The Luchagors (2007)
