= The Escape Engine =

American post-hardcore band of the 2000s

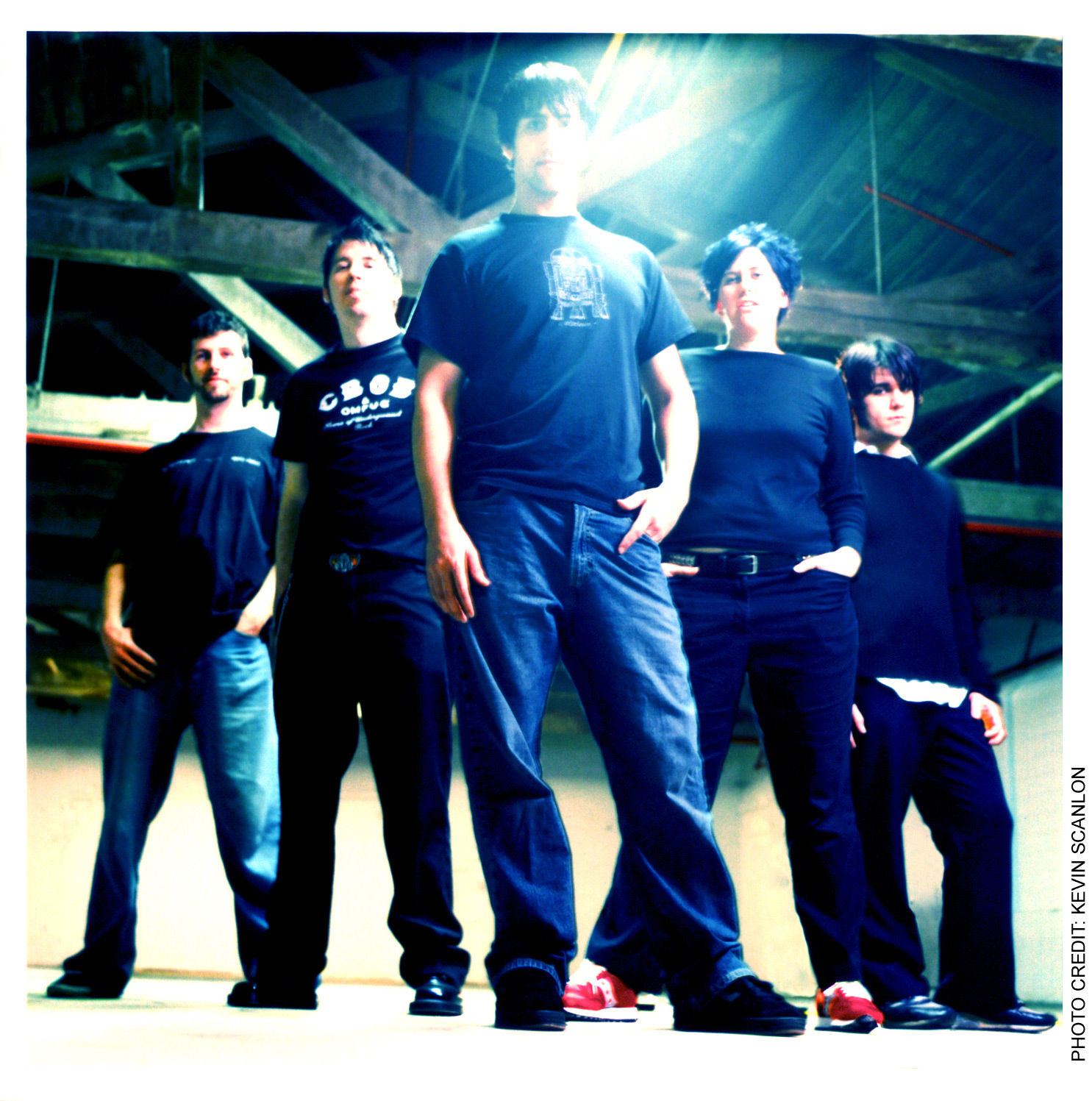

Background information
- Origin: Paramus, New Jersey, United States
- Genres: Post-hardcore; Alternative rock
- Years active: 2002–2006
- Label: Fidelity Records
- Past members: Dom Lettera; George Leontaris; Kevin B. Robbins; John "Fitz" Fitzpatrick; Amanda Klimek; Chris Osborne; Mike Carroll; Conor Clark; Aaron Elliott
- Website: theescapeengine.com

The Escape Engine was a post-hardcore band from Paramus, New Jersey, United States, that existed from 2002 to 2006. They were signed to Fidelity Records.

== History ==
The Escape Engine was founded in the spring of 2002 by vocalist Dom Lettera and guitarist/vocalist George Leontaris after the break-up of Two Weeks From Tomorrow. Soon after, Kevin B. Robbins, John "Fitz" Fitzpatrick (who, along with George Leontaris, played in Two Weeks From Tomorrow as well), and Amanda Klimek joined the line up.

The band's name comes from a Burning Airlines song titled "The Escape Engine". It wasn't until the band was at the recording studio, finishing up their 4-song demo, where the engineer asked what name should be put on the master that the band finally agreed on the name.

Within a matter of months of recording their demo the band was approach by Jon Strauss whose intentions were to start an independent record label. The band ended up becoming the first band to sign with the newly created Fidelity Records.

== Celebrity Role Model ==
In February 2003, the band entered the studio with producer Jesse Cannon, to record their first full-length album, Celebrity Role Model. It was released on May 27, 2003. The album art featured photos taken of a young woman named Brittney Hammer, a friend of the band from California.

The magazine Alternative Press gave Celebrity Role Model a 5-star rating in August 2003.

The first single from the album was "This Jagged Alibi". A video for the song was created, which featured Hammer, as well as Eyerly St. James. The video was produced and directed by Darren Doane, and shot by Shane Drake. The video premiered on MTV2's Extreme Rock on July 13, 2003, and soon after was broadcast on MTV, MTVX and MuchMusic.

"This Jagged Alibi" was included in the 2003 compilation albums Wonka Vision Issue No. 23 Winter 2003, Radiotakeover Presents the Back to School Tour '03 and Go-Kart MP300 Raceway. The video for "This Jagged Alibi" was included in the video compilation XdoaneX - The Shape of Videos to Come. Another song from the album, "A Lesson In Futility", was included in the compilation album CMJ New Music Monthly Sampler, CMJ New Music Monthly Volume 113.

The Escape Engine were selected as one of ten bands to perform on the summer 2003 Warped Tour.

"Welcome To The Conversation" was featured in Warren Miller's 2003 film titled "Journeys." While "Intro", Celebrity Role Model's first track, was featured in the movie's trailer.

== Departures ==
Upon arriving back in New Jersey after 4 months of touring along the east coast and performing on the Warped Tour, John Fitzpatrick informed the other members that he was leaving the band. Shortly after, the band auditioned several drummers as a replacement; among them were Chris Osborne and Aaron Elliott. The band eventually selected Osborne as Fitzpatrick's replacement. Osborne officially joined The Escape Engine in early October. Later that month, on October 22, 2003, John Fitzpatrick returned to play his last show with The Escape Engine at Tobacco Road in New York City as part of the 2003 CMJ Music Marathon.

The group hit the road again on November 3, 2003, this time for their first U.S. cross-continental tour. By early January 2004 guitarist Kevin B. Robbins, departed from the band over creative differences. Mike Carroll, Lettera's longtime friend who often accompanied the band on tour, stepped in to replace Robbins. Robbins later partnered with Jonathan Strauss to assist with the Fidelity Records label.

The band broke up in 2006.

In August 2011, Conor Clark (the band's final rhythm guitarist) died in Ridgewood, New Jersey.

The band re-united on May 4, 2012, for a single sold-out performance at Maxwell's in Hoboken, New Jersey.

== Members ==
"A Lesson In Futility"
"A Lesson In Futility" from Celebrity Role Model

"This Jagged Alibi"
"This Jagged Alibi" was the first single from Celebrity Role Model

Original

- Dom Lettera - vocals
- George Leontaris - lead guitar, vocals
- Kevin B. Robbins - rhythm guitar
- Amanda Klimek - bass
- John Fitzpatrick - drums, percussion

Others

- Chris Osborne - drums, percussion
- Aaron Elliott – drums, percussion
- Mike Carroll - rhythm guitar
- Conor Clark - rhythm guitar

== Discography ==
- Celebrity Role Model, May 2003

== Press ==
- All Ages at The Saint (live show review) - NJ Coast Newsletter (November 2002)
- The Engine's Mechanics - The Aquarian, East Coast Rocker (June 2003)
- Celebrity Role Model (cd review) thePRP.com (June 2003)
- Celebrity Role Model (cd review) - CD Baby (2003)
- Celebrity Role Model (cd review) Punknews.org (August 2003)
- Screamo? Emocore? Emo violence? - Wonka Vision (August 2003)
- Alternative Press Magazine (August 2003)
- The Escape Engine offers repetitiveness Den Music (September 2003)
- Celebrity Role Model (cd review) - belchinwaffles.com (October 2003)
- Celebrity Role Model (cd review) - Skratch Magazine (October 2003)
- Forging their own scene - Washington Square News (November 2003)
- Celebrity Role Model (cd review) - Wickedland
- Honesty is the best Policy - The Aquarian, East Coast Rocker (November 2004)
