= WWE's Most Wanted Treasures =

2021 American television series

- Season 2 poster
- Genre: Reality
- Created by: Paul "Triple H" Levesque; Stephanie McMahon
- Presented by: A. J. Francis (Season 1); Booker T (Season 2–present); Mick Foley (Season 2–present); Lita (Season 2–present)
- Country of origin: United States
- Original language: English
- No. of seasons: 3
- No. of episodes: 24 (list of episodes)

Production
- Production company: WWE Studios

Original release
- Network: A&E
- Release: April 18, 2021 – July 14, 2024

WWE's Most Wanted Treasures is an American reality television series. The series premiered on A&E on April 18, 2021.

On March 1, 2022, it was announced that A&E had ordered 24 more episodes of the series.

== Plot ==
The series involves various WWE personalities, instructed by Paul "Triple H" Levesque and Stephanie McMahon, traveling across the country with A. J. Francis (Season 1) or Booker T, Mick Foley and Lita (Season 2–present) searching for collectibles related to professional wrestling.

== Series overview ==
Season	Episodes	Originally released	
Season	Episodes	First released	Last released
1	9	April 18, 2021	June 20, 2021
2	10	April 30, 2023	July 9, 2023
3	5	April 14, 2024	July 14, 2024

== Episode list ==
=== Season 1 (2021) ===
No.	Title	Original release date	Viewers	Rating (18–49)
1	"Mick Foley"	April 18, 2021	766,000	0.3
Items: Mr. Socko, Original Cactus Jack Flannel Jacket, Original Mankind Leather Vest
2	"The Undertaker & Kane"	April 25, 2021	769,000	0.3
Items: Kane Mask, Kane's Unabomb Gear, Undertaker's Urn, Various items in The Undertaker's storage unit, including his black and purple jacket, phantom mask.
3	"Jerry Lawler"	May 2, 2021	563,000	0.2
Items: Robes from King of the Ring (1993), Andy Kaufman's neck brace used during Lawler's feud with Kaufman in Continental Wrestling Association, Boots
4	"Booker T"	May 9, 2021	555,000	0.2
Items: King Booker Black robe, Junkyard Dog's collar, WCW World Television Championship (not found)
5	"Sgt. Slaughter & The Iron Sheik"	May 16, 2021	497,000	0.2
Items: Iron Sheik's boots from WrestleMania 2 and Persian Clubs, Sgt. Slaughter's Campaign hat and Swagger stick. Note: Iron Sheik is not featured in the episode because of health issues. Bob Backlund is featured.
6	"Jake Roberts"	May 30, 2021	455,000	0.2
Items: Snake bag, The Honky Tonk Man's guitar (donated by Jimmy Hart), Hall of Fame tuxedo, WrestleMania III ring (not purchased because WWE thought it was not the authentic one)
7	"Brutus "The Barber" Beefcake & Greg "The Hammer" Valentine"	June 6, 2021	527,000	0.2
Items: Greg Valentine's Robe, Brutus Beefcake's Shears, Greg Valentine's boots, Brutus Beefcake's Mega-Maniacs Mask and Greg Valentine's Heart Breaker Shinguard (Donated by Jimmy Hart) Note: Features Jimmy Hart
8	"André the Giant"	June 13, 2021	N/A	TBA
Items: The Big Show's "Andre Tribute" Singlet (donated by Big Show), Madison Square Garden playbill from Andre's debut, Mark Henry's debut jacket (donated by Mark Henry), André the Giant's Jacket from The Main Event (on loan), The Giant Machine Mask (on loan), Andre the Giant's Pink Jacket (on loan) and Andre the Giant's passport. Note: Features Sonny Onoo and Tim White.
9	"Ric Flair"	June 20, 2021	492,000	0.2
Items: Black Butterfly robe as worn in his WWE debut on Prime Time Wrestling and as worn at the 1992 Royal Rumble

=== Season 2 (2023) ===
No. overall	No. in season	Title	Original release date	Viewers	Rating (18–49)
10	1	"Stone Cold Steve Austin"	April 30, 2023	N/A	TBA
Items: WWF Intercontinental Championship (1988–98) (on loan), Stone Cold's knee brace from Wrestlemania XIV (on loan), Stone Cold's Alcohol Fueled vest
11	2	"DX"	May 7, 2023	N/A	TBA
Items: New Age Outlaws World Tag Team Championship (1985–1998), Chyna's metal suit (not found), Pictures of Chyna (Donated by Kathy Hamilton), DX's Invasion Jeep (on loan) Note: Billy Gunn does not appear in the episode due to him working for AEW.
12	3	"Randy Savage"	May 14, 2023	N/A	TBA
Items: Macho King Ring Gear (on loan, scepter not found), Macho Man Monster Truck Cowboy Hat from Halloween Havoc 1996, Mega Powers robe, Videos of Macho Man's ICW matches Note: Episode dedicated to Lanny Poffo who discusses the ICW videos. He died on February 2, 2023. Features Molly Holly.
13	4	"Bret Hart"	May 21, 2023	N/A	TBA
Items: Jim Neidhart's Hart Foundation's Jacket (on loan), Bret's WrestleMania VIII Jacket, Bret's Montreal Screwjob Sunglasses (not found) Note: Features Natalya Neidhart and Peter Rosenberg.
14	5	"Goldberg"	May 28, 2023	N/A	TBA
Items: Goldberg's WWE Debut Jacket (on loan), Goldberg's WWE Boots, Goldberg's Undefeated Streak Gloves (not found)
15	6	"Roddy Piper"	June 11, 2023	N/A	TBA
Items: Roddy's Original Bagpipes (loan), Roddy's Hollywood Backlot Brawl Jacket, Roddy's WrestleMania 2 Boxing Trunks (loan), Roddy's Signature Kilt with Sporran (loan), Roddy's Leather Jacket (loan) Note: Features Drew McIntyre and Teal Piper
16	7	"Rey Mysterio & Eddie Guerrero"	June 18, 2023	N/A	TBA
Items: Rey Mysterio's WWE Debut Mask & Outfit (loan), Eddie Guerrero's Lowrider, Rey Mysterio's Custody Match Gear (not found), Rey Mysterio's Mask from final Eddie match (loan) Note: Features Dominik Mysterio
17	8	"Kurt Angle"	June 25, 2023	N/A	TBA
Items: Kurt's Cowboy Hat (loan), Kurt's Gear (loan), Kurt's Milk Truck (not acquired), Kurt's WrestleMania XIX Singlet (traded for 2002 Armageddon singlet) Note: Features Stone Cold Steve Austin
18	9	"Trish Stratus & Alundra"	July 2, 2023	N/A	TBA
Items: Trish & Lita's Raw Main Event Gear, Mae Young's Crown & Robe (traded for Edge's 2005 Money in the Bank briefcase), Alundra's WWF Women's Championship (not acquired)
19	10	"Samoan Dynasty (ft. Rikishi)"	July 9, 2023	N/A	TBA
Items: Rikishi's Sumo Belt (bought for $3,000 plus VIP Tickets to Extreme Rules 2022), Yokozuna's WrestleMania X Robe (traded for Gorgeous George's Robe), The Rock's $500 Shirt (bought from Jerry Lawler for $10,000) Note: Features Afa Anoaʻi Jr. and Jerry Lawler.

=== Season 3 (2024) ===
No. overall	No. in season	Title	Original release date	Viewers	Rating (18–49)
20	1	"WCW"	April 14, 2024	281,000	0.09
Items: Hulk's NWO Tights (bought for $10,000), Harlem Heat's Flame Gear, Kevin Nash's Outsiders and Fingerpoke of Doom Singlets (traded for tickets to WrestleMania XL), Scott Hall's NWO Gear, Steiner Brothers' Letterman Jacket, Rick Steiner's Head Gear, Scott Steiner's Chainmail Head Gear (bought for $9,000) Note: Features Hulk Hogan, Eric Bischoff, Stevie Ray, Cody Hall, Diamond Dallas Page, and Bron Breakker.
21	2	"Dusty Rhodes"	April 21, 2024	296,000	0.08
Items: Red & Yellow Polka Dots Gear (loan), Black & Yellow Polka Dots Gear (loan), 1984 Starrcade Custom Cowboy Boots & June 1985 Pro Wrestling Illustrated Magazine (bought for $5,000), Booking Journals (loan), Fur coat (loan) Note: Features Cody Rhodes
22	3	"The Miz"	April 28, 2024	236,000	0.06
Items: Intercontinental Championship Gear (Traded for Raw is XXX backstage experience), Tag Team Championship Gear (donated), United States Championship Trunks (donated by Miz), WrestleMania 27 Jacket (donated by Miz), WrestleMania 34 Glasses (donated by Miz)
23	4	"Triple H"	May 5, 2024	299,000	0.10
Items: Blueblood Attire, Signature Sledgehammer, 1998 SummerSlam Ladder Match Gear (loan), The Rock's 1998 SummerSlam Ladder Match Gear (loan)
24	5	"Ultimate Warrior"	July 14, 2024	158,000	TBA
Items: WrestleMania V Trunks (Traded for Undertaker Urn), Ultimate Maniacs Singlet (loan), Final Era Gear (loan) Note: Features Sheamus, Jimmy Hart
