= Nine Legends =

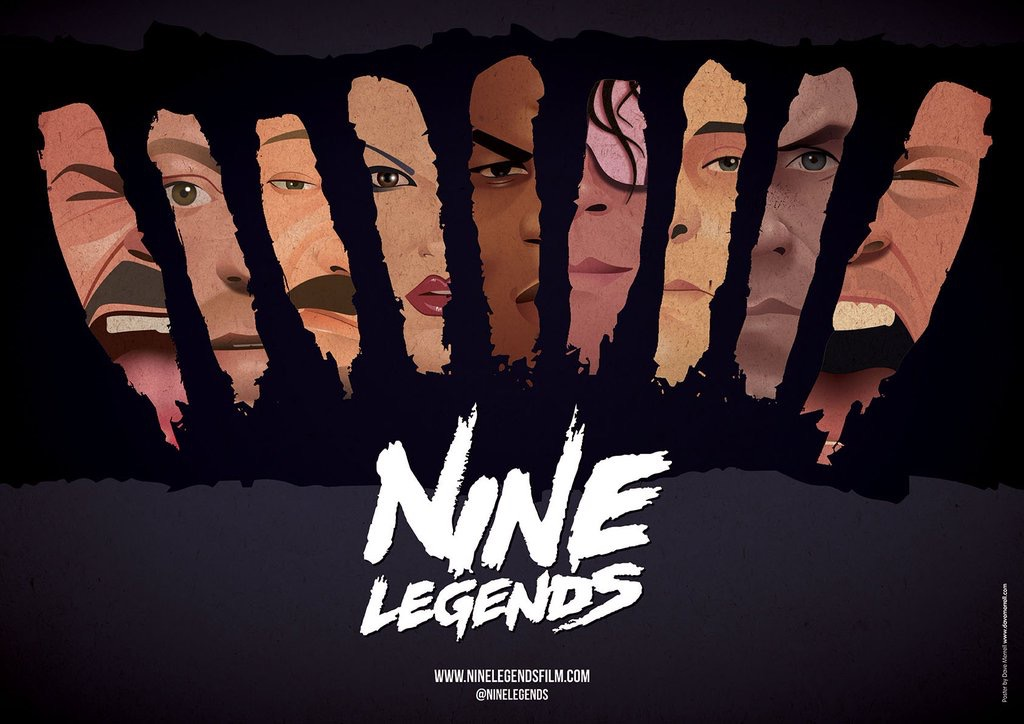
- Promotional Poster for Nine Legends
- Produced by: David Sinnott
- Starring: Bill Goldberg; Rob Van Dam; Ted DiBiase; Amy Dumas; Mike Tyson; Bret Hart; Dynamite Kid; Randy Couture; Chris Jericho
- Release date: January 28, 2016
- Running time: 122 minutes
- Countries: United Kingdom; United States
- Language: English

Nine Legends is a professional wrestling documentary released online via an official stream in January 2016. The film features interviews with seven professional wrestlers, boxer and occasional wrestling personality Mike Tyson and former amateur wrestler and UFC fighter Randy Couture. The film uses a drama narrative to frame the interviews.

== Cast ==
In order of appearance the film features: Bill Goldberg, Rob Van Dam, Ted DiBiase, Amy Dumas (Lita), Mike Tyson, Bret Hart, Dynamite Kid, Randy Couture and Chris Jericho. In an interview with The Miami Herald, director David Sinnott summed up the cast as "nine legendary athletes from diverse backgrounds and eras."

== Reception ==
The announcement of the film and its subsequent trailers was covered by Fox Sports, Yahoo News and Forbes amongst other notable publications.

== Expansion Pack ==
In October 2016 a feature-length audio commentary track of the documentary was released which featured a different guest for each of the nine scenes. Speakers included Diamond Dallas Page, Robin Leach, Ken Shamrock and Barry W. Blaustein.
