= CM Punk: Best in the World =

- Directed by: Kevin Dunn
- Starring: CM Punk; Mike Adamle; Brent Albright
- Production company: WWE
- Distributed by: WWE Home Video
- Release date: October 29, 2012
- Running time: 427
- Language: English

CM Punk: Best in the World is a 2012 documentary film released by WWE Home Video as part of a three-DVD set on October 29, 2012, by World Wrestling Entertainment (WWE). The documentary chronicles the career of WWE wrestler CM Punk. Punk collaborated with WWE to make the documentary, contributing hours of interview content to the film. The collaboration coincided with Punk's famous 434-day reign as WWE Champion. The documentary chronicles Punk's early days as a professional wrestler with backyard and independent wrestling covered extensively with footage from IWA Mid-South and Ring of Honor (ROH) all the way to his rise to stardom in WWE.

This is the third documentary about CM Punk, the first being Before They Were Wrestling Stars: CM Punk (which was distributed by Big Vision Entertainment) which chronicles some of Punk's best works from ROH and Full Impact Pro (FIP).

== Overview ==
Disc 1

The Documentary:

- High School Sports
- CM Punk - The Name
- Skull Fracture
- OVW vs. Albright
- From Extra to Champion
- December to Dismember

Disc 2 and 3

The second and third discs contains a selections of matches from Punk's career.

== Reception ==
The DVD has received positive reviews. It won the 2012 Wrestling Observer Newsletter award in the category "Best Pro Wrestling Documentary".

== Match content ==
- Brent Albright vs. CM Punk (Ohio Valley Wrestling, March 1, 2006)
  - OVW Heavyweight Championship final tournament.
- CM Punk vs. Justin Credible (ECW, August 1, 2006)
  - Punk's WWE TV debut.
- CM Punk vs. John Morrison (ECW, September 4, 2007)
  - Punk won the ECW Championship, making it his first title in WWE.
- Chris Jericho vs. Shelton Benjamin vs. John Morrison vs. Carlito vs. CM Punk vs. MVP vs. Mr. Kennedy (WrestleMania XXIV, March 30, 2008)
  - Punk wins Money in the Bank for the first time.
- CM Punk & Kofi Kingston vs. Cody Rhodes & Ted DiBiase (Monday Night Raw, October 27, 2008)
  - Punk & Kingston won the World Tag Team Championships, giving Punk his first tag team title in WWE.
- CM Punk vs William Regal (Monday Night Raw, January 19, 2009)
  - Punk won the Intercontinental Championship in a no-disqualification match in his hometown of Chicago.
- Jeff Hardy vs. CM Punk (SummerSlam, August 23, 2009)
  - Punk won his third world title in WWE after defeating Hardy in the main event and reclaiming the World Heavyweight Championship.
- Rey Mysterio vs. CM Punk (Over the Limit, May 23, 2010)
  - Punk lost a match against Mysterio with his hair on the line.
- John Cena vs. CM Punk (Money in the Bank, July 17, 2011)
  - Punk won his fifth world title in WWE after defeating Cena in his hometown of Chicago and achieving the WWE Championship.
- CM Punk vs. Chris Jericho (WrestleMania XXVIII, April 1, 2012)
  - Punk's first world title match at WrestleMania.
- CM Punk vs. Daniel Bryan (Over the Limit May 20, 2012)
  - Punk successfully retained his world title over Bryan.
