= Nuclear Psychology =

EP by Weird Owl
- Released: February 21, 2007
- Genre: Psychedelic rock
- Length: 35:29
- Label: Weird Owl

Weird Owl chronology
Nuclear Psychology (2007)	Ever the Silver Cord Be Loosed (2009)

Nuclear Psychology is an EP recorded by the American psychedelic rock band Weird Owl, released on February 21, 2007.

== Recording ==
The album was partially recorded at Seaside Lounge Studios in Brooklyn, New York City. The EP's cover art is a reference to the cover art for the 1973 album The Dark Side of the Moon by English rock band Pink Floyd. Trevor Tyrrell, guitarist and lead vocalist for Weird Owl, has stated that "the cover was a quick joke having more to do with our self-presumed spot in the continuum of mind-music more than it has to do with any great reverence for Floyd. We felt as if we were the sons of a certain musical father (in a collective sense) and that it was now time for the son to assert his independence".

== Track listing ==
No.	Title	Length
1.	"Like 100,000 Sunsets"	8:05
2.	"Thy Space Grows Long"	5:40
3.	"White Hidden Fire"	7:03
4.	"Tickle the Invisible"	7:49
5.	"King of Flowers (ESP)"	6:52
Total length:		35:29

== Personnel ==
Weird Owl

- Trevor Tyrrell – guitar, lead vocals
- Josh Weber – organ
- Sean Reynolds – drums
- John Cassidy – bass

Additional production

- Gerard Garone – recording
- Harley Zinger – recording
