= The Teeth =

Band

- Origin: Philadelphia, United States
- Genres: Rock, experimental rock, indie rock
- Years active: 2001–2008, 2024-
- Label: Park the Van
- Members: Aaron MoDavis; Peter MoDavis; Brian Ashby; Jonas Oesterle

The Teeth is an indie rock band from Philadelphia consisting of twin brothers Aaron MoDavis on rhythm guitar and Peter MoDavis on bass guitar. Other members include Brian Ashby on lead guitar and Jonas Oesterle on drums. They were created in 2001 when the MoDavis brothers moved to Philadelphia, and they have since risen to prominence in the Philadelphia area and have reached a cult status throughout the rest of the United States.

Aaron, Peter, and Brian first played together while they were students at Freedom High School in Bethlehem, Pennsylvania. Initially, Brian, Peter, and their drummer friend Greg Kulik briefly were part of a band called "The Salty Dogs." Later, these same three, along with Brian's brother Doug Ashby, formed the blues band Hurry Down Sunshine, which cut two CDs, one of which, "Raw in Memphis", didn't feature Peter or Greg but did include some guitar solos by Brian Ashby.

Often appearing at open mic nights sponsored by Freedom High's literary-and-arts magazine PEN AND INK, Brian, Peter, and Aaron performed together in various combinations, sometimes covering David Bowie tunes and sometimes (as "The Pants") featuring original songs often heavily influenced by Brian Wilson, Talking Heads, Bowie, and The Beatles.

In 2005, the band performed at North East Sticks Together.

In March 2008, The Teeth disbanded after their last tour with The Dead Trees, just after their performance at the South by Southwest in Austin, Texas. Later musical projects created by the band members include The Purples and Squawk Brothers.

In January 2024, the band reunited through a series of live performances in the Philadelphia venue Johnny Brendas, followed by a March performance in the First Unitarian Church.

== Critical reception ==
A number of sources have praised the Teeth, including Rolling Stone, Paste magazine, RJD2 in XLR8R magazine, and Jon Pareles in The New York Times.

== In media ==
In 2005, Moonrock Films created a documentary called Bones Grow: An Introduction to the Teeth that contains a series of live performances and practice sessions of the band.

== Discography ==
- Send My Regards to the Sunshine (2002), Park the Van
- The Christmas City (2003) - With Raccoon Raccoon (5) | Discogs, Park the Van
- Carry the Wood - EP (2005), Park the Van
- You're My Lover Now (2007), Park the Van

== Reunion ==
On January 12th, 2024 The Teeth reunited for a show at Johnny Brendas in Philadelphia, Pennsylvania. This reunion follows a 16 year disbandment. Today the band is still active and has been performing shows since their reunion.
