= Ever the Silver Cord Be Loosed =

Studio album by Weird Owl
- Released: February 17, 2009
- Genre: Psychedelic rock
- Length: 46:23
- Label: Tee Pee Records

Weird Owl chronology
Nuclear Psychology (2007)	Ever the Silver Cord Be Loosed (2009)	Build Your Beast a Fire (2011)

Professional ratings
Review scores
Source	Rating
AllMusic	3.5/5 stars

Ever the Silver Cord Be Loosed is the first studio album by the American psychedelic rock band Weird Owl, released by the label Tee Pee Records on February 17, 2009. The album was released following their 2007 EP entitled Nuclear Psychology.

== Recording ==
The album was recorded in a studio over a short period of around five days, making use of instruments such as a Roland VK-7 electronic keyboard as well as instruments and amplifiers manufactured by Fender and Wurlitzer. The album's cover art was designed by Weird Owl's guitarist and lead vocalist, Trevor Tyrrell, alongside his wife.

== Track listing ==
No.	Title	Length
1.	"Mind Mountain"	5:26
2.	"Skeletelepathic"	4:55
3.	"13 Arrows, 13 Stars"	6:18
4.	"Tobin's Spirit Guide"	6:01
5.	"Do What Th'owl Wilt"	5:34
6.	"Phases of the Moon"	5:47
7.	"In The Secrecy Of Oceans"	5:19
8.	"Flying Low Through The Air After Thunder"	7:03
Total length:		46:23

== Personnel ==
- Trevor Tyrrell – guitar, lead vocals
- Jon Rudd – guitar
- Kenneth Cook – bass guitar, keyboards, synths, back-up vocals
- Sean Reynolds – drums
- John Cassidy – keyboards, synths
