= You're My Lover Now =

Studio album by The Teeth
- Released: May 29, 2007
- Genre: Indie rock
- Length: 37:58
- Label: Park the Van
- Producer: Nick Krill

The Teeth chronology
Carry the Wood - EP (2005)	You're My Lover Now (2007)

Professional ratings
Review scores
Source	Rating
AllMusic	4/5 stars
Dallas Observer	(favorable)
Filter Magazine	91/100
JIVE Magazine	4/5 stars
New York Times	(favorable)
Pop Matters	8/10 stars
Time Out New York	4/6 stars

You're My Lover Now is the third album by the Teeth, released on May 29, 2007. The Teeth's bassist and songwriter Peter MoDavis said of the album, "Emotionally, it is a painfully absurd vision of the mundane intertwined with inspiring buildups and pathetic letdowns." Cristina Black of Time Out New York stated that the album is "more serious" than its predecessor Carry the Wood, "without sacrificing the quirks that save their music from the pitfalls of earnest retro-pop."

== Track listing ==
All tracks are written by the Teeth.

No.	Title	Length
1.	"Molly Make Him Pay"	2:57
2.	"The Trumpets Blared"	2:59
3.	"Shoulderblade"	2:59
4.	"A Fight in the Dark"	2:59
5.	"Yellow"	2:06
6.	"Your Feelings on Life"	2:01
7.	"The Coolest Kid in School"	2:39
8.	"Walk Like a Clown"	3:07
9.	"Ball of the Dead Rat"	2:28
10.	"It's Over, It's Over"	1:49
11.	"You're My Lover Now"	2:38
12.	"Rabbit Run"	2:50
13.	"It's Not Funny"	3:19
14.	"That Light Always Goes Out"	3:07
