= Wonka Vision =

American music magazine

- Editor-in-Chief: Justin Luczejko
- Managing Editor: Jason Schreurs
- Senior Editors: Jason Garder; Bill Gordon; Julia Kaganskiy; Lansie Sylvia; Ellen Thompson
- Music Editors: Katie Ellsweig; Jeff Meyers
- Art Directors: Bruno Guerreiro; Chris Holub; Jon Loudon; Rachel Wescott
- Staff writers: Jocelyn Aucoin; Matt Conner; Kevin Diers; Jason Garder; Emma Hernandez; Jeff Ott; Milkman; JerseyJef
- Photographer: Joelle Andres; Dustin Festenmacher; Colin Frangicetto; Beowulf Sheehan; Gene Smirnov; Kelly Turso; Jon Weiner; Nick Wilson Illustrators Colin Frangicetto; Joseph Game; Julie Laquer; Rachel Wescott
- Categories: Music
- Circulation: bimonthly
- Publisher: Justin Luczejko
- Founder: Justin Luczejko
- First issue: 1998
- Final issue: 2010
- Country: United States
- Based in: Philadelphia, Pennsylvania
- Language: English
- Website: wonkavisionmagazine.com
- OCLC: 61680028

Wonka Vision was an American music magazine.

== History ==
While Justin Luczejko was attending high school, he started Wonka Vision with two friends, Elysa Stein and Andrew Wertz in 1998; a twenty-page zine that they copied at an OfficeMax store. Philadelphia City Paper describes Wonka Vision as an "ambitious music and pop culture zine started as a creative outlet for a kid stranded in suburbia." The name comes from the 1971 film, Willy Wonka & the Chocolate Factory. In 2001 Wonka Vision also became a record label. Adrian Finiak contributed to several issues highlighting Glamour Kills clothing company and Neon Blonde (featuring members of The Blood Brothers). Wonka Vision ceased publication in 2010.

== Content ==
Wonka Vision contains interviews, reviews, poetry, indie-punk and zine reviews, and "pointed leftist rants and bits of kitschy minutiae." The cover is printed in full color. Guitarist Colin Frangicetto did photography for the magazine. In a 2008 interview with South Philly Review, Luczejko explains that Wonka Vision "do[es] art, politics, anything that's sort of underground, on that edge [...] it's not just rock, we do hip-hop-always have-I grew up listening to rap, indie rock, hardcore, we've done what we love." The bimonthly magazine featured interviews, album reviews, and pop culture articles.
