= Weird Owl =

American rock band

- Origin: Brooklyn, New York City, U.S.
- Genres: Psychedelic rock
- Years active: 2004–present
- Labels: Tee Pee, A Recordings, Ltd., Little Cloud
- Members: Trevor Tyrrell; Jon Rudd; Sean Reynolds; Kenneth Cook; John Cassidy

Weird Owl are an American psychedelic rock band from Brooklyn, New York, formed in 2004. Their first recording, Nuclear Psychology, was released in 2007. Their debut studio album, Ever the Silver Cord Be Loosed, was released in 2009 by Tee Pee Records. Their second album, Build Your Beast a Fire, was released in 2011, and received generally positive reviews. Their mini-LP Healing was released in 2013, followed by the album Interstellar Skeletal in 2015.

The band's music has been compared to that of Deep Purple, Hawkwind, Neil Young, Pink Floyd, and Spirit. Weird Owl's discography, alongside being labeled as psychedelic rock, has also been categorized as stoner rock and space rock.

== Members ==
- Trevor Tyrrell – guitar, lead vocals
- Jon Rudd – guitar
- Sean Reynolds – drums
- Kenneth Cook – bass, keyboards, synthesizer, backing vocals
- John Cassidy – keyboards, synths

== Discography ==
Studio albums

- Ever the Silver Cord Be Loosed (2009)
- Build Your Beast a Fire (2011)
- Healing (2013)
- Interstellar Skeletal (2015)
- Bubblegum Brainwaves (2017)
- Wet Telepathy (2019)

EPs

- Nuclear Psychology (2007)
