= June 28 =

June 28 this year in various calendars
- Sunday, 28 June 2026
Akan	Fokwasi
Armenian	13 Hrotich 1475
Aztec	Tepeilhuitl 9, 1 Ōlīn
Babylonian	12 Simanu, 2337 SE
Balinese pawukon	Menga, Pasah, Jaya, Umanis, Tungleh, Redite of Langkir, Guru, Dangu, Pandita
Bengali	14 Asharh, BS 1433
Chinese	Yin Water Rooster・Room Mansion; Fire Horse Year, Month 5, Day 14 (Xiazhi, 9 days until Xiaoshu)
Common Era	28 June 2026 CE
Coptic	21 Paoni, AM 1742
Egyptian	13 Athyr, 2775 NE
Ethiopian	21 Sanē, 2018 Amätä Məhrät
French Republican	Décade I, Décadi de Messidor de l'Année 234 de la République
Gregorian	28 June, AD 2026
Hebrew	13 Tamuz, AM 5786
Hindu	Jyeṣṭhā・Śubha; Solar: 14 Āṣāḍha, 1948 SE; Lunisolar: Caturdaśī, Śukla pakṣa of Jyeṣṭha, 2083 VE; Rāudra・5127 KY・1,872,754
Icelandic	Sunnudagur, 7 Sólmánuður 2026
Islamic	12 Muharram, AH 1448 (using tabular method)
ISO week date	2026-W26-7
Japanese	14 Satsuki, Reiwa 8 (Geshi, 9 days until Shōsho)
Julian	15 June, AD 2026 (AM 7534)
Julian day	2461220
Korean	14 Maldal, 4359 DE
Maya	13.0.13.12.17; 10 Tzec, 1 Caban
Roman	ante diem XVII Kalendas Iulias, MMDCCLXXIX AUC
Solar Hijri	7 Tir, SH 1405
Tibetan	14 snron, me pho rta 2153 or 1772 or 1000

<<	June					>>
Su	Mo	Tu	We	Th	Fr	Sa
	1	2	3	4	5	6
7	8	9	10	11	12	13
14	15	16	17	18	19	20
21	22	23	24	25	26	27
28	29	30
2026

June 28 in recent years
2026 (Sunday)
2025 (Saturday)
2024 (Friday)
2023 (Wednesday)
2022 (Tuesday)
2021 (Monday)
2020 (Sunday)
2019 (Friday)
2018 (Thursday)
2017 (Wednesday)

June 28 is the 179th day of the year (180th in leap years) in the Gregorian calendar; 186 days remain until the end of the year.

== Events ==
=== Pre-1600 ===
- 1098 – Fighters of the First Crusade defeat Kerbogha of Mosul at the battle of Antioch.
- 1360 – Muhammed VI becomes the tenth Nasrid king of Granada after killing his brother-in-law Ismail II.
- 1461 – Edward, Earl of March, is crowned King Edward IV of England.
- 1495 – A French force heavily defeats a much larger Neapolitan and Spanish army at the battle of Seminara, leading to the creation of the Tercios by Gonzalo de Córdoba.
- 1519 – Charles V is elected Emperor of the Holy Roman Empire.
- 1575 – Sengoku period of Japan: The combined forces of Oda Nobunaga and Tokugawa Ieyasu are victorious in the Battle of Nagashino.

=== 1601–1900 ===
- 1635 – Guadeloupe becomes a French colony.
- 1651 – The Battle of Berestechko between Poland and Ukraine starts.
- 1745 – A New England colonial army captures the French fortifications at Louisbourg (New Style).
- 1776 – American Revolution: Thomas Jefferson and the Committee of Five present the draft of the United States Declaration of Independence to the Second Continental Congress, which orders it to "lie on the table" for further edits by the assembly.
- 1776 – American Revolutionary War: The Battle of Sullivan's Island ends with the American victory, leading to the commemoration of Carolina Day.
- 1776 – American Revolutionary War: Thomas Hickey, Continental Army private and bodyguard to General George Washington, is hanged for mutiny and sedition.
- 1778 – American Revolutionary War: The American Continentals engage the British in the Battle of Monmouth Courthouse resulting in standstill and British withdrawal under cover of darkness.
- 1797 – French troops disembark in Corfu, beginning the French rule in the Ionian Islands.
- 1807 – Second British invasion of the Río de la Plata; John Whitelocke lands at Ensenada on an attempt to recapture Buenos Aires and is defeated by the locals.
- 1838 – Coronation of Queen Victoria of the United Kingdom.
- 1841 – The Paris Opera Ballet premieres Giselle in the Salle Le Peletier.
- 1855 – Sigma Chi fraternity is founded in North America.
- 1859 – The first conformation dog show is held in Newcastle upon Tyne, England.
- 1865 – The Army of the Potomac is disbanded.
- 1870 – The US Congress establishes the first federal holidays (New Year Day, July 4th, Thanksgiving, and Christmas).
- 1880 – Australian bushranger Ned Kelly is captured at Glenrowan.
- 1881 – The Austro–Serbian Alliance of 1881 is secretly signed.
- 1882 – The Anglo-French Convention of 1882 marks the territorial boundaries between Guinea and Sierra Leone.
- 1894 – Labor Day becomes an official US holiday.
- 1895 – The United States Court of Private Land Claims rules James Reavis's claim to Barony of Arizona is "wholly fictitious and fraudulent."
- 1896 – An explosion in the Newton Coal Company's Twin Shaft Mine in Pittston, Pennsylvania results in a massive cave-in that kills 58 miners.

=== 1901–present ===
- 1902 – The U.S. Congress passes the Spooner Act, authorizing President Theodore Roosevelt to acquire rights from Colombia for the Panama Canal.
- 1904 – The SS Norge runs aground on Hasselwood Rock in the North Atlantic 430 kilometres (270 mi) northwest of Ireland. More than 635 people die during the sinking.
- 1911 – The Nakhla meteorite, the first one to suggest signs of aqueous processes on Mars, falls to Earth, landing in Egypt.
- 1914 – Causes of World War I: Archduke Franz Ferdinand of Austria and his wife Sophie are assassinated in Sarajevo, beginning the July Crisis and providing the casus belli of World War I.
- 1917 – World War I: Greece joins the Allied powers.
- 1919 – The Treaty of Versailles is signed, ending the state of war between Germany and the Allies of World War I.
- 1921 – Serbian King Alexander I proclaims the new constitution of the Kingdom of Serbs, Croats and Slovenes, known thereafter as the Vidovdan Constitution.
- 1922 – The Irish Civil War begins with the shelling of the Four Courts in Dublin by Free State forces.
- 1926 – Mercedes-Benz is formed by Gottlieb Daimler and Karl Benz merging their two companies.
- 1936 – The Japanese puppet state of Mengjiang is formed in northern China.
- 1940 – Romania cedes Bessarabia and Northern Bukovina to the Soviet Union after facing an ultimatum.
- 1942 – World War II: Nazi Germany starts its strategic summer offensive against the Soviet Union, codenamed Case Blue.
- 1945 – Poland's Soviet-allied Provisional Government of National Unity is formed over a month after V-E Day.
- 1948 – Cold War: The Tito–Stalin Split results in the expulsion of the League of Communists of Yugoslavia from the Cominform.
- 1948 – Boxer Dick Turpin beats Vince Hawkins at Villa Park in Birmingham to become the first black British boxing champion in the modern era.
- 1950 – Korean War: Suspected communist sympathizers (between 60,000 and 200,000) are executed in the Bodo League massacre.
- 1950 – Korean War: Packed with its own refugees fleeing Seoul and leaving their 5th Division stranded, South Korean forces blow up the Hangang Bridge in an attempt to slow North Korea's offensive. The city falls later that day.
- 1950 – Korean War: The Korean People's Army kills almost a thousand doctors, nurses, inpatient civilians and wounded soldiers in the Seoul National University Hospital massacre.
- 1956 – In Poznań, workers from HCP factory go to the streets, sparking one of the first major protests against communist government both in Poland and Europe.
- 1964 – Malcolm X forms the Organization of Afro-American Unity.
- 1969 – Stonewall riots begin in New York City, marking the start of the Gay Rights Movement.
- 1973 – Elections are held for the Northern Ireland Assembly, which will lead to power-sharing between unionists and nationalists in Northern Ireland for the first time.
- 1976 – The Angolan court sentences US and UK mercenaries to death sentences and prison terms in the Luanda Trial.
- 1978 – The United States Supreme Court, in Regents of the University of California v. Bakke, bars quota systems in college admissions.
- 1981 – A powerful bomb explodes in Tehran, killing 73 officials of the Islamic Republican Party.
- 1982 – Aeroflot Flight 8641 crashes in Mazyr, Belarus, killing 132 people.
- 1987 – For the first time in military history, a civilian population is targeted for chemical attack when Iraqi warplanes bomb the Iranian town of Sardasht.
- 1989 – On the 600th anniversary of the Battle of Kosovo, Slobodan Milošević delivers the Gazimestan speech at the site of the historic battle.
- 1997 – Holyfield–Tyson II: Mike Tyson is disqualified in the third round for biting a piece off Evander Holyfield's ear.
- 2001 – Slobodan Milošević is extradited to the ICTY in The Hague to stand trial.
- 2004 – Iraq War: Sovereign power is handed to the interim government of Iraq by the Coalition Provisional Authority, ending the U.S.-led rule of that nation.
- 2009 – Honduran president Manuel Zelaya is ousted by a local military coup following a failed request to hold a referendum to rewrite the Honduran Constitution. This was the start of the 2009 Honduran constitutional crisis.
- 2012 – The United States Supreme Court upholds the constitutionality of the Affordable Care Act's individual mandate in National Federation of Independent Business v. Sebelius.
- 2016 – A terrorist attack in Turkey's Istanbul Atatürk Airport kills 42 people and injures more than 230 others.

== Births ==
=== Pre-1600 ===
- 751 – Carloman I, king of the Franks (died 771)
- 1243 – Emperor Go-Fukakusa of Japan (died 1304)
- 1444 – Charlotte, Queen of Cyprus (died 1487)
- 1476 – Pope Paul IV (died 1559)
- 1490 – Albert of Brandenburg, German archbishop (died 1545)
- 1491 – Henry VIII, King of England (died 1547)
- 1503 – Giovanni della Casa, Italian author and poet (died 1556)
- 1547 – Cristofano Malvezzi, Italian organist and composer (died 1599)
- 1557 – Philip Howard, 20th Earl of Arundel, English nobleman (died 1595)
- 1560 – Giovanni Paolo Lascaris, Grand Master of the Knights Hospitaller (died 1657)
- 1573 – Henry Danvers, 1st Earl of Danby, English noble (died 1644)
- 1577 – Peter Paul Rubens, Flemish painter and diplomat (died 1640)
- 1582 – William Fiennes, 1st Viscount Saye and Sele, English politician (died 1662)

=== 1601–1900 ===
- 1604 – Heinrich Albert, German composer and poet (died 1651)
- 1641 – Marie Casimire Louise de La Grange d'Arquien, consort to King John III Sobieski (died 1716)
- 1653 – Muhammad Azam Shah, Mughal emperor (died 1707)
- 1703 – John Wesley, English cleric and theologian (died 1791)
- 1712 – Jean-Jacques Rousseau, Swiss philosopher and polymath (died 1778)
- 1719 – Étienne François, duc de Choiseul, French general and politician, Prime Minister of France (died 1785)
- 1734 – Jean-Jacques Beauvarlet-Charpentier, French organist and composer (died 1794)
- 1742 – William Hooper, American physician, lawyer, and politician (died 1790)
- 1824 – Paul Broca, French physician, anatomist, and anthropologist (died 1880)
- 1825 – Emil Erlenmeyer, German chemist (died 1909)
- 1831 – Joseph Joachim, Austrian violinist, composer, and conductor (died 1907)
- 1836 – Emmanuel Rhoides, Greek journalist and author (died 1904)
- 1844 – John Boyle O'Reilly, Irish-born poet, journalist and fiction writer (died 1890)
- 1852 – Charles Cruft, English showman, founded Crufts Dog Show (died 1938)
- 1867 – Luigi Pirandello, Italian dramatist, novelist, and poet, Nobel Prize laureate (died 1936)
- 1873 – Alexis Carrel, French surgeon and biologist, Nobel Prize laureate (died 1944)
- 1875 – Henri Lebesgue, French mathematician and academic (died 1941)
- 1879 – Wilhelm Steinkopf, German chemist (died 1949)
- 1880 – John Meyers, American swimmer and water polo player (died 1971)
- 1883 – Pierre Laval, French soldier and politician, 101st Prime Minister of France (died 1945)
- 1884 – Lamina Sankoh, Sierra Leonean banker and politician (died 1964)
- 1888 – George Challenor, Barbadian cricketer (died 1947)
- 1888 – Stefi Geyer, Hungarian violinist and educator (died 1956)
- 1891 – Esther Forbes, American historian and author (died 1968)
- 1891 – Carl Spaatz, American general (died 1974)
- 1892 – Carl Panzram, American serial killer (died 1930)
- 1893 – August Zamoyski, Polish-French sculptor (died 1970)
- 1894 – Jessie Baetz, Canadian-American artist, composer and pianist (died 1974 or later)
- 1894 – Francis Hunter, American tennis player (died 1981)

=== 1901–present ===
- 1902 – Richard Rodgers, American playwright and composer (died 1979)
- 1906 – Maria Goeppert Mayer, German-American physicist and academic, Nobel Prize laureate (died 1972)
- 1907 – Jimmy Mundy, American saxophonist and composer (died 1983)
- 1907 – Yvonne Sylvain, First female Haitian physician (died 1989)
- 1909 – Eric Ambler, English author and screenwriter (died 1998)
- 1912 – Carl Friedrich von Weizsäcker, German physicist and philosopher (died 2007)
- 1913 – Franz Antel, Austrian director and producer (died 2007)
- 1913 – George Lloyd, English soldier and composer (died 1998)
- 1913 – Walter Oesau, German colonel and pilot (died 1944)
- 1914 – Aribert Heim, Austrian SS physician and Nazi war criminal (died 1992)
- 1915 – David "Honeyboy" Edwards, American delta blues guitarist (died 2011)
- 1917 – A. E. Hotchner, American author and playwright (died 2020)
- 1918 – William Whitelaw, 1st Viscount Whitelaw, Scottish-English politician, Deputy Prime Minister of the United Kingdom (died 1999)
- 1919 – Joseph P. Lordi, American government official (died 1983)
- 1920 – Clarissa Eden, Spouse of the Prime Minister of the United Kingdom (died 2021)
- 1921 – P. V. Narasimha Rao, Indian lawyer and politician, 9th Prime Minister of India (died 2004)
- 1923 – Pete Candoli, American trumpet player (died 2008)
- 1923 – Adolfo Schwelm Cruz, Argentinian racing driver (died 2012)
- 1923 – Gaye Stewart, Canadian ice hockey player (died 2010)
- 1924 – Kalevi Keihänen, Finnish entrepreneur (died 1995)
- 1926 – George Booth, American cartoonist (died 2022)
- 1926 – Mel Brooks, American actor, director, producer, and screenwriter
- 1926 – Robert Ledley, American academic and inventor (died 2012)
- 1927 – Correlli Barnett, English historian and author (died 2022)
- 1927 – Frank Sherwood Rowland, American chemist and academic, Nobel Prize laureate (died 2012)
- 1928 – Hans Blix, Swedish politician and diplomat, 33rd Swedish Minister of Foreign Affairs
- 1928 – Patrick Hemingway, American writer (died 2025)
- 1928 – Harold Evans, English-American historian and journalist (died 2020)
- 1928 – Peter Heine, South African cricketer (died 2005)
- 1928 – Cyril Smith, English politician (died 2010)
- 1929 – Alfred Miodowicz, Polish politician (died 2021)
- 1930 – William C. Campbell, Irish-American biologist and parasitologist, Nobel Prize laureate
- 1930 – Itamar Franco, Brazilian engineer and politician, 33rd President of Brazil (died 2011)
- 1930 – Jack Gold, English director and producer (died 2015)
- 1931 – Hans Alfredson, Swedish actor, director, and screenwriter (died 2017)
- 1931 – Junior Johnson, American race car driver (died 2019)
- 1931 – Lucien Victor, Belgian cyclist (died 1995)
- 1932 – Pat Morita, American actor (died 2005)
- 1933 – Gusty Spence, Northern Irish loyalist and politician (died 2011)
- 1934 – Robert Carswell, Baron Carswell, Northern Irish lawyer and judge, Lord Chief Justice of Northern Ireland (died 2023)
- 1934 – Roy Gilchrist, Jamaican cricketer (died 2001)
- 1934 – Bette Greene, American journalist and author (died 2020)
- 1934 – Carl Levin, American lawyer and politician (died 2021)
- 1934 – Georges Wolinski, Tunisian-French journalist and cartoonist (died 2015)
- 1935 – John Inman, English actor (died 2007)
- 1936 – Chuck Howley, American football player
- 1937 – George Knudson, Canadian golfer (died 1989)
- 1937 – Fernand Labrie, Canadian endocrinologist and academic (died 2019)
- 1937 – Ron Luciano, American baseball player and umpire (died 1995)
- 1938 – John Byner, American actor and comedian
- 1938 – Leon Panetta, American lawyer and politician, 23rd United States Secretary of Defense
- 1938 – S. Sivamaharajah, Sri Lankan Tamil newspaper publisher and politician (died 2006)
- 1938 – Simon Douglas-Pennant, 7th Baron Penrhyn, British baron
- 1939 – Klaus Schmiegel, German chemist
- 1940 – Karpal Singh, Malaysian lawyer and politician (died 2014)
- 1940 – Muhammad Yunus, Bangladeshi economist and academic, Nobel Prize laureate
- 1941 – Al Downing, American baseball player and sportscaster
- 1941 – Joseph Goguen, American computer scientist and academic, developed the OBJ language (died 2006)
- 1941 – David Johnston, Canadian academic, lawyer, and politician, 28th Governor General of Canada
- 1942 – Chris Hani, South African politician (died 1993)
- 1942 – Hans-Joachim Walde, German decathlete (died 2013)
- 1942 – Frank Zane, American professional bodybuilder and author
- 1943 – Jens Birkemose, Danish painter (died 2022)
- 1943 – Donald Johanson, American paleontologist and academic
- 1943 – Klaus von Klitzing, German physicist and academic, Nobel Prize laureate
- 1945 – Ken Buchanan, Scottish boxer (died 2023)
- 1945 – Jane Harman, American politician (Member of the U.S. House of Representatives from California)
- 1945 – David Knights, English bass player and producer
- 1945 – Raul Seixas, Brazilian singer-songwriter, guitarist, and producer (died 1989)
- 1945 – Türkan Şoray, Turkish actress, director, and screenwriter
- 1946 – Robert Asprin, American soldier and author (died 2008)
- 1946 – Bruce Davison, American actor and director
- 1946 – David Duckham, English rugby player (died 2023)
- 1946 – Robert Xavier Rodríguez, American classical composer
- 1946 – Jaime Guzmán, Chilean lawyer and politician (died 1991)
- 1946 – Gilda Radner, American actress and comedian (died 1989)
- 1947 – Mark Helprin, American novelist and journalist
- 1947 – Laura Tyson, American economist and academic
- 1948 – Kathy Bates, American actress
- 1948 – Sergei Bodrov, Russian-American director, producer, and screenwriter
- 1948 – Deborah Moggach, English author and screenwriter
- 1948 – Daniel Wegner, Canadian-American psychologist and academic (died 2013)
- 1949 – Don Baylor, American baseball player and coach (died 2017)
- 1950 – Philip Fowke, English pianist and educator
- 1950 – Mauricio Rojas, Chilean-Swedish economist and politician
- 1950 – Chris Speier, American baseball player and coach
- 1951 – Mick Cronin, Australian rugby league player and coach
- 1951 – Mark Shand, English conservationist and author (died 2014)
- 1951 – Lalla Ward, English actress and author
- 1952 – Enis Batur, Turkish poet and author
- 1952 – Pietro Mennea, Italian sprinter and politician (died 2013)
- 1952 – Jean-Christophe Rufin, French physician and author
- 1954 – A. A. Gill, Scottish author and critic (died 2016)
- 1954 – Alice Krige, South African actress
- 1955 – Shirley Cheriton, British actress
- 1956 – Amira Hass, Israeli journalist and author
- 1956 – Noel Mugavin, Australian footballer and coach
- 1957 – Lance Nethery, Canadian ice hockey player and coach
- 1957 – Georgi Parvanov, Bulgarian historian and politician, 4th President of Bulgaria
- 1957 – Mike Skinner, American race car driver
- 1957 – Jim Spanarkel, American basketball player and sportscaster
- 1958 – Donna Edwards, American lawyer and politician
- 1958 – Félix Gray, Tunisian-French singer-songwriter
- 1959 – Clint Boon, English singer and keyboard player
- 1959 – John Shelley, British illustrator
- 1960 – John Elway, American football player and manager
- 1960 – Roland Melanson, Canadian ice hockey player and coach
- 1961 – Kurt Eichenwald, American journalist
- 1961 – Jeff Malone, American basketball player and coach
- 1962 – Anișoara Cușmir-Stanciu, Romanian long jumper
- 1962 – Artur Hajzer, Polish mountaineer (died 2013)
- 1962 – Ann-Louise Skoglund, Swedish hurdler
- 1963 – Peter Baynham, Welsh actor, producer, and screenwriter
- 1963 – Charlie Clouser, American keyboard player, songwriter, and producer
- 1964 – Christina Ashcroft, Canadian sport shooter
- 1964 – Mark Grace, American baseball player and sportscaster
- 1964 – Bernie McCahill, New Zealand rugby player
- 1964 – Dan Stains, Australian rugby league player and coach
- 1964 – Steve Williamson, English saxophonist and composer
- 1965 – Jessica Hecht, American actress
- 1965 – Tiaan Strauss, South African rugby player
- 1966 – Peeter Allik, Estonian painter and illustrator (died 2019)
- 1966 – Bobby Bare Jr., American singer-songwriter and guitarist
- 1966 – John Cusack, American actor and screenwriter
- 1966 – Mary Stuart Masterson, American actress
- 1967 – Leona Aglukkaq, Canadian politician, 7th Canadian Minister of Health
- 1967 – Gil Bellows, Canadian actor and producer
- 1967 – Zhong Huandi, Chinese runner
- 1967 – Lars Riedel, German discus thrower
- 1968 – Chayanne, Puerto Rican-American singer-songwriter and actor
- 1969 – Tichina Arnold, American actress and singer
- 1969 – Stéphane Chapuisat, Swiss footballer
- 1969 – Fabrizio Mori, Italian hurdler
- 1970 – Mushtaq Ahmed, Pakistani cricketer and coach
- 1970 – Tom Merritt, American journalist
- 1970 – Mike White, American actor, director, producer, and screenwriter
- 1971 – Lorenzo Amoruso, Italian footballer
- 1971 – Fabien Barthez, French footballer
- 1971 – Bobby Hurley, American basketball player and coach
- 1971 – Ron Mahay, American baseball player and scout
- 1971 – Elon Musk, South African-born American entrepreneur
- 1971 – Aileen Quinn, American actress and singer
- 1972 – Ngô Bảo Châu, Vietnamese-French mathematician and academic
- 1972 – Chris Leslie, English politician, Shadow Chancellor of the Exchequer
- 1972 – Geeta Tripathee, Nepali poet, lyricist and literary critic
- 1972 – Alessandro Nivola, American actor
- 1973 – Adrián Annus, Hungarian hammer thrower
- 1973 – Corey Koskie, Canadian baseball player
- 1974 – Rob Dyrdek, American skateboarder, entrepreneur, and reality television star
- 1975 – Jon Nödtveidt, Swedish singer-songwriter, and guitarist (died 2006)
- 1976 – Shinobu Asagoe, Japanese tennis player
- 1976 – Seth Wescott, American snowboarder
- 1977 – Chris Spurling, American baseball player
- 1977 – Mark Stoermer, American bass player, songwriter, and producer
- 1977 – Harun Tekin, Turkish singer and guitarist
- 1978 – Simon Larose, Canadian tennis player
- 1979 – Felicia Day, American actress and writer
- 1979 – Randy McMichael, American football player
- 1979 – Florian Zeller, French author and playwright
- 1980 – Jevgeni Novikov, Estonian footballer
- 1981 – Savage, New Zealand rapper
- 1981 – Michael Crafter, Australian singer-songwriter
- 1981 – Guillermo Martínez, Cuban javelin thrower
- 1981 – Brandon Phillips, American baseball player
- 1982 – Ibrahim Camejo, Cuban long jumper
- 1985 – Phil Bardsley, English footballer
- 1985 – Colt Hynes, American baseball player
- 1986 – Kellie Pickler, American singer-songwriter
- 1987 – Sonata Tamošaitytė, Lithuanian hurdler
- 1987 – Terrence Williams, American basketball player
- 1989 – Jason Clark, Australian rugby league player
- 1989 – Andrew Fifita, Australian rugby league player
- 1989 – David Fifita, Australian rugby league player
- 1989 – Julia Zlobina, Russian-Azerbaijani figure skater
- 1989 – Markiplier, American internet personality
- 1989 – Nicole Rottmann, Austrian tennis player
- 1991 – Seohyun, South Korean singer, dancer, and actress
- 1991 – Kevin De Bruyne, Belgian footballer
- 1991 – Kang Min-hyuk, South Korean singer, drummer, and actor
- 1992 – Oscar Hiljemark, Swedish footballer
- 1992 – Elaine Thompson, Jamaican sprinter
- 1993 – Bradley Beal, American basketball player
- 1994 – Hussein, Crown Prince of Jordan
- 1996 – Donna Vekić, Croatian tennis player
- 1996 – Larissa Werbicki, Canadian rower
- 1997 – Tadasuke Makino, Japanese racing driver
- 1997 – Shakur Stevenson, American boxer
- 1999 – Markéta Vondroušová, Czech tennis player
- 2002 – Marta Kostyuk, Ukrainian tennis player
- 2005 – Tom Bischof, German footballer
- 2005 – Pio Esposito, Italian footballer

== Deaths ==
=== Pre-1600 ===
- 202 – Yuan Shao, Chinese warlord
- 548 – Theodora I, Byzantine empress
- 572 – Alboin, King of the Lombards
- 683 – Leo II, pope of the Catholic Church (born 611)
- 767 – Paul I, pope of the Catholic Church (born 700)
- 975 – Cyneweard, bishop of Wells
- 1031 – Taira no Tadatsune, Japanese governor
- 1061 – Floris I, count of Holland
- 1175 – Andrey Bogolyubsky, Russian Grand Prince (born 1111)
- 1189 – Matilda of England, Duchess of Saxony, (born 1156)
- 1194 – Xiao Zong, Chinese emperor (born 1127)
- 1385 – Andronikos IV, Byzantine emperor (born 1348)
- 1497 – James Tuchet, 7th Baron Audley, English rebel leader (born c. 1463)
- 1575 – Yonekura Shigetsugu, Japanese samurai
- 1586 – Primož Trubar, Slovenian author and reformer (born 1508)
- 1598 – Abraham Ortelius, Flemish cartographer and geographer (born 1527)

=== 1601–1900 ===
- 1607 – Domenico Fontana, Italian architect (born 1543)
- 1716 – George FitzRoy, 1st Duke of Northumberland, English general and politician, Lord Lieutenant of Berkshire (born 1665)
- 1757 – Sophia Dorothea of Hanover, queen consort of Frederick William I (born 1687)
- 1798 – John Henry Colclough, Irish revolutionary (born c. 1769)
- 1813 – Gerhard von Scharnhorst, Prussian general and politician, Prussian Minister of War (born 1755)
- 1834 – Joseph Bové, Russian architect, designed the Triumphal Arch of Moscow (born 1784)
- 1836 – James Madison, American academic and politician, 4th President of the United States (born 1751)
- 1880 – Texas Jack Omohundro, American soldier and hunter (born 1846)
- 1881 – Jules Armand Dufaure, French politician, 33rd Prime Minister of France (born 1798)
- 1889 – Maria Mitchell, American astronomer and academic (born 1818)
- 1892 – Alexandros Rizos Rangavis, Greek poet and politician, Greek Foreign Minister (born 1810)

=== 1901–present ===
- 1913 – Manuel Ferraz de Campos Sales, Brazilian lawyer and politician, 4th President of Brazil (born 1841)
- 1914 – Sophie, duchess of Hohenberg (born 1868)
- 1914 – Franz Ferdinand, archduke of Austria (born 1863)
- 1915 – Victor Trumper, Australian cricketer (born 1877)
- 1917 – Ștefan Luchian, Romanian painter and educator (born 1868)
- 1922 – Velimir Khlebnikov, Russian poet and playwright (born 1885)
- 1925 – Georgina Febres-Cordero, Venezuelan nun (born 1861)
- 1925 – Henry C. Berghoff, German-American politician (born 1856)
- 1929 – Edward Carpenter, English poet and philosopher (born 1844)
- 1932 – Urania Marquard Olsen, Danish-Norwegian actress and theatre director (born 1856)
- 1936 – Alexander Berkman, American author and activist (born 1870)
- 1939 – Douglas H. Johnston, governor of the Chickasaw Nation (born 1856)
- 1940 – Italo Balbo, Italian air marshal and politician (born 1896)
- 1944 – Friedrich Dollmann, German general (born 1882)
- 1945 – Yunus Nadi Abalıoğlu, Turkish journalist (born 1879)
- 1947 – Stanislav Kostka Neumann, Czech writer, poet and journalist (born 1875)
- 1960 – Jake Swirbul, American businessman, co-founded the Grumman Aircraft Engineering Corporation (born 1898)
- 1962 – Mickey Cochrane, American baseball player and manager (born 1903)
- 1962 – Cy Morgan, American baseball player (born 1878)
- 1965 – Red Nichols, American cornet player, bandleader, and composer (born 1905)
- 1966 – Mehmet Fuat Köprülü, Turkish historian and politician, 21st Deputy Prime Minister of Turkey (born 1890)
- 1971 – Franz Stangl, Austrian SS officer (born 1908)
- 1974 – Vannevar Bush, American engineer and academic (born 1890)
- 1975 – Constantinos Apostolou Doxiadis, Greek architect (born 1913)
- 1975 – Rod Serling, American screenwriter and producer (born 1924)
- 1976 – Ruby McKim, American quilter (born 1891)
- 1978 – Clifford Dupont, English-Rhodesian lawyer and politician, 1st President of Rhodesia (born 1905)
- 1980 – José Iturbi, Spanish pianist and conductor (born 1895)
- 1981 – Terry Fox, Canadian runner and activist (born 1958)
- 1983 – Alf Francis, German-English motor racing mechanic and racing car constructor (born 1918)
- 1984 – Yigael Yadin, Israeli archaeologist, general, and politician (born 1917)
- 1985 – Lynd Ward, American author and illustrator (born 1905)
- 1989 – Joris Ivens, Dutch journalist, director, and producer (born 1898)
- 1992 – Guy Nève, Belgian racing driver (born 1955)
- 1992 – Mikhail Tal, Latvian chess player (born 1936)
- 1995 – Petri Walli, Finnish singer-songwriter, guitarist, and producer (born 1969)
- 1999 – Vere Bird, first Prime Minister of Antigua and Barbuda (born 1910)
- 2000 – Nils Poppe, Swedish actor, director, and screenwriter (born 1908)
- 2001 – Mortimer J. Adler, American philosopher and author (born 1902)
- 2003 – Joan Lowery Nixon, American journalist and author (born 1927)
- 2004 – Anthony Buckeridge, English author (born 1912)
- 2005 – Brenda Howard, American activist (born 1946)
- 2005 – Michael P. Murphy, American lieutenant, Medal of Honor recipient (born 1976)
- 2006 – Jim Baen, American publisher, founded Baen Books (born 1943)
- 2006 – Peter Rawlinson, Baron Rawlinson of Ewell, English lawyer and politician, Attorney General for England and Wales (born 1919)
- 2006 – George Unwin, English pilot and commander (born 1913)
- 2007 – Eugene B. Fluckey, American admiral, Medal of Honor recipient (born 1913)
- 2007 – Kiichi Miyazawa, Japanese lawyer and politician, 78th Prime Minister of Japan (born 1919)
- 2009 – A. K. Lohithadas, Indian director, producer, and screenwriter (born 1955)
- 2009 – Billy Mays, American TV personality (born 1958)
- 2010 – Robert Byrd, American lawyer and politician (born 1917)
- 2012 – Richard Isay, American psychiatrist and author (born 1934)
- 2012 – Leontine T. Kelly, American bishop (born 1920)
- 2012 – Robert Sabatier, French author and poet (born 1923)
- 2012 – Doris Sams, American baseball player (born 1927)
- 2013 – Ted Hood, American sailor and architect (born 1927)
- 2013 – Tamás Katona, Hungarian historian and politician (born 1932)
- 2013 – Kenneth Minogue, New Zealand-Australian political scientist and academic (born 1930)
- 2013 – F. D. Reeve, American author and academic (born 1928)
- 2013 – David Rubitsky, American sergeant (born 1917)
- 2014 – Seymour Barab, American cellist and composer (born 1921)
- 2014 – Jim Brosnan, American baseball player (born 1929)
- 2014 – On Kawara, Japanese painter (born 1933)
- 2014 – Meshach Taylor, American actor (born 1947)
- 2015 – Jack Carter, American actor and comedian (born 1922)
- 2015 – Jope Seniloli, Fijian politician, Vice-President of Fiji (born 1939)
- 2015 – Wally Stanowski, Canadian ice hockey player (born 1919)
- 2016 – Scotty Moore, American guitarist (born 1931)
- 2016 – Pat Summitt, American women's college basketball head coach (born 1952)
- 2016 – Buddy Ryan, American football coach (born 1931)
- 2018 – Harlan Ellison, American writer (born 1934)
- 2023 – Lowell Weicker, French-American politician, 85th Governor of Connecticut (born 1931)
- 2024 – Orlando Cepeda, Puerto Rican baseball player (born 1937)
- 2024 – Audrey Flack, American artist (born 1931)
- 2024 – Mohamed Osman Jawari, Somali attorney and politician, 12th Speaker of the Parliament of Somalia (born 1945)
- 2025 – Aminu Dantata, Nigerian businessman and philanthropist (born 1931)
- 2025 – D. Wayne Lukas, American horse trainer (born 1935)
- 2025 – Dave Parker, American baseball player and coach (born 1951)
- 2026 – Wilford Lloyd Baumes, American screenwriter and television producer (born 1939)

== Holidays and observances ==
- International LGBTQ Pride Day, marking the anniversary of Stonewall riots.
- Christian feast day:
  - Basilides and Potamiana
  - Irenaeus of Lyon (Western Christianity)
  - Heimerad
  - Blessed Maria Pia Mastena
  - Paulus I
  - Vincenza Gerosa
  - June 28 (Eastern Orthodox liturgics)
- Constitution Day (Ukraine)
- Poznań Remembrance Day (Poland)
- Vidovdan, celebrating St. Vitus and an important day in Serbian history. (Eastern Orthodox Church)
- Tau Day
