= The Burial (soundtrack) =

The Burial (Amazon Original Motion Picture Score)

Film score by Michael Abels
- Released: October 6, 2023
- Genre: Film score
- Length: 34:58
- Label: Amazon Content Services
- Producer: Michael Abels

Michael Abels chronology
Landscape with Invisible Hand (2023)	The Burial (2023)

The Burial (Amazon Original Motion Picture Score) is the score album to the 2023 film of the same name directed by Maggie Betts and starring Tommy Lee Jones and Jamie Foxx. Featuring a musical score by Michael Abels, the soundtrack featuring 23 cues from his score, was released on October 6, 2023 through Amazon Content Services.

== Background ==
The original cut opened on an establishing shot of a tree in a grassy field, that served as an unmarked burial ground for enslaved Africans in North America and underscored "Jesu, Joy of Man's Desiring" (Note: an arrangement of 1723 Advent cantata Herz und Mund und Tat und Leben (Heart and Mouth and Deed and Life), BWV 147, by Johann Sebastian Bach) in organ to sound like a funeral, but after the shot was replaced, Abels composed a theme similar to that piece which was a series of downward triplets composed by using French horn.

Both the director and composer agreed that the film should have a classical score, contrasting the 1990s hip hop music used as needle drops and throwing the audience off balance. He played a woodwind motif in the first act where the case is first explained that makes the audience question. He said "When you have woodwinds and you have that space between the notes, it kind of makes you go [...] Every nugget of information that goes in in the beginning, we need people to keep track of those so that when it all starts to fit together, they're with us."

Another theme was curated using a waltz motif for piano and harp when the scene showcases the underhanded deal between the funeral corporation and the Black church. At the end credits, which showcases a shot of the burial ground, Abels rearranged another piece of "Jesu, Joy of Man's Desiring" that also interweaves the main theme he had composed for.

== Track listing ==
No.	Title	Length
1.	"You Done Good"	0:57
2.	"Call Me a Child of God"	0:46
3.	"A Family Business"	1:32
4.	"A Bit of Trouble"	0:58
5.	"That Tall Kid"	0:54
6.	"Settlement Offer"	1:06
7.	"Filing the Lawsuit"	0:28
8.	"No Intention of Closing"	0:59
9.	"The Yacht"	1:37
10.	"Family Is Everything"	1:35
11.	"Wake Up"	1:56
12.	"Willie's Apology"	0:39
13.	"No Need to Say Sorry"	1:38
14.	"The Hotel Bar"	1:40
15.	"Gonna Have Him On Cross"	2:47
16.	"The Deal With the Black Church"	1:32
17.	"Cemetery Without Headstones"	1:06
18.	"Objection Overruled"	1:06
19.	"One History on Top of Another"	2:45
20.	"Turning the Tide"	1:42
21.	"The Verdict Is Read"	2:28
22.	"See You on the Trail"	1:02
23.	"Quodlibet – Jesu Joy of Man's Desiring"	3:45
Total length:		34:58

== Reception ==
James Southall of Movie Wave wrote "The whole thing's got drama and emotion and, needless to say, given the length (also 1990s style!) doesn't threaten for even a moment to outstay its welcome. It's grown-up film music and I heartily recommend it." Patrice Witherspoon of Screen Rant wrote "Composer Michael Abels ensures that every emotion we're supposed to feel is supported and amplified through his music." Nick Schager of The Daily Beast wrote "Michael Abels' score never resorts to excessive mawkishness".

== Accolades ==
Variety anticipated the score by Abels would be in contention for the Academy Award for Best Original Score at the 96th Academy Awards.

Award	Date of Ceremony	Category	Recipient(s)	Result	Ref
Hollywood Music in Media Awards	November 15, 2023	Original Score – Feature Film	Michael Abels	Nominated	
