= Jamez McCorkle =

American opera singer

- Born: 1989 or 1990 (age 35–36); New Orleans, Louisiana, U.S.
- Education: Curtis Institute of Music
- Occupation: Opera singer

Jamez McCorkle (/dʒəˈmɛz/ jə-MEZZ; born 1989/1990) is an American opera singer. A tenor, he is known for originating the title role in the 2022 opera Omar.

== Early life and education ==
McCorkle was born in New Orleans. His mother, who was very supportive of him, died just before his college auditions. McCorkle originally focused on piano before switching to voice, later graduating from the Curtis Institute of Music.

== Career ==
McCorkle's first contracted opera performance was the role of Vladimir Lensky in Eugene Onegin, at the Spoleto Festival USA in 2017. Prior to that, in 2012 he took part in the "I Sing Beijing" program, performing at the National Centre for the Performing Arts (China), and appeared on a popular China Central Television program, performing George Gershwin's "It Ain't Necessarily So" alongside American soprano Meghan Picerno and Dutch-Canadian Tenor Lucas van Lierop.

His other operatic roles include Peter the Honeyman in Porgy and Bess, the Duke of Cornwall in Lear, Leonard Woolf in The Hours, and Telemaco in Il ritorno d'Ulisse in patria.

In May 2022, McCorkle sang the title role of Omar ibn Said, an enslaved Muslim scholar, in the world premiere of Omar at the Spoleto Festival USA. He went on to perform the same role in productions throughout the country, and the opera went on to receive the 2023 Pulitzer Prize for Music.

In May 2023, McCorkle performed an original interpretation of the song cycle Dichterliebe ("A Poet's Love"), with music by Robert Schumann set to poetry by Heinrich Heine. He sang and accompanied himself on the piano, alongside video projections by visual designer Miwa Matreyek and dancing by Jah'Mar Coakley.
