= John Kennedy (American musician) =

American conductor and composer (born 1959)

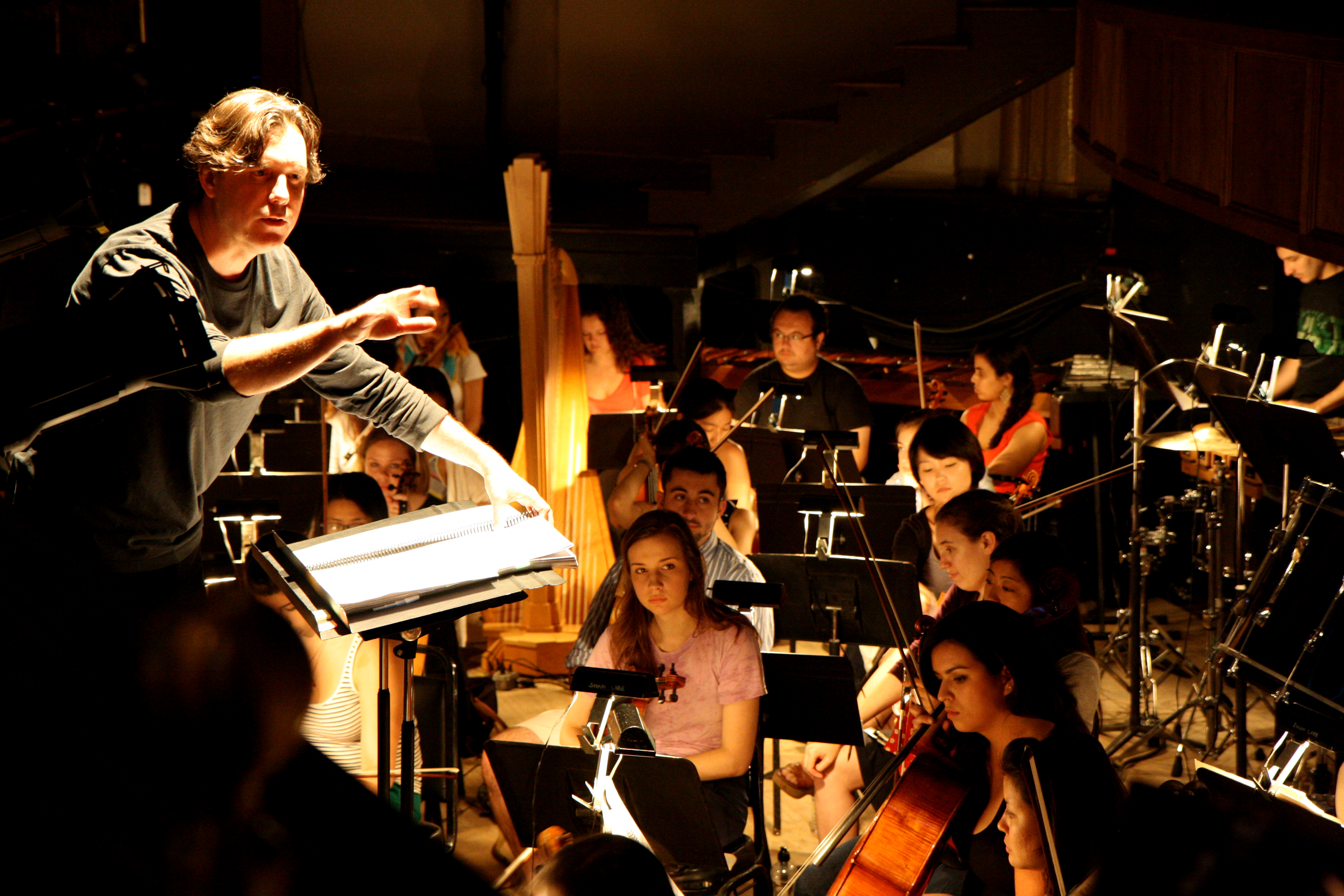
- Kennedy rehearsing Kepler (2012)
- Born: April 7, 1959 (age 67); Minnesota, U.S.
- Citizenship: American
- Education: Oberlin Conservatory; Northwestern University
- Occupations: Conductor, composer, percussionist
- Years active: 1980s–present
- Known for: Contemporary music; Spoleto Festival USA; opera Omar
- Website: johnkennedymusic.com

John Kennedy (born April 7, 1959) is an American conductor and composer. He has worked across the United States, collaborating with contemporary composers and leading ensembles and festivals, including Spoleto Festival USA. Kennedy is known for his long commitment to new music and for conducting the world premiere of the Pulitzer Prize–winning opera Omar in 2022.

== Biography ==
Originally a percussionist from Minnesota who was trained at the Oberlin Conservatory and Northwestern University, Kennedy lived in New York City from 1984 to 1999. Kennedy co-founded and led the new music ensemble Essential Music, a group of flexible instrumentation which from 1987 to 2001 led a broad traversal of the American experimental tradition and presented several concerts. During this period Kennedy had an association with John Cage, reviving a number of Cage's early works, including restoring the Kenneth Patchen radio play The City Wears a Slouch Hat. Kennedy also led the rediscoveries of the music of Johanna M. Beyer and William Russell in performances and recordings by Essential Music.

== Santa Fe and American Music Center ==
Kennedy lived in Santa Fe from 1999 to 2012, where he founded Santa Fe New Music. From 2002-2005, he served as artist President/Chair of the American Music Center.

== Spoleto Festival USA ==
Kennedy had a long association with Spoleto Festival USA, leading the contemporary music component since 1990 and over time, assuming a wider role in the orchestra and opera programs. His curation featured many underrepresented composers before they were more widely performed. From 2010 to 2023, he was the festival's director of orchestral activities and established the festival as a unique outpost in the U.S. for international opera, leading the American premieres of operas by Pascal Dusapin, Luca Francesconi, Philip Glass, Helmut Lachenmann, Liza Lim, Wolfgang Rihm, Kaija Saariaho, Toshio Hosokawa, and others. He conducted the World Premiere productions of Paradise Interrupted (2015) by Huang Ruo as well as Omar (2022) by Rhiannon Giddens and Michael Abels.

== Conducting career ==
As a conductor, he has led over 300 World and U.S. premieres, and conducted opera, orchestra, ballet, and new music projects with numerous organizations and festivals, throughout the U.S., Europe, and Asia. Kennedy has written and spoken widely on contemporary music and advocated audience development through its relevance and accessibility to general audiences. His work at Spoleto and in Santa Fe has been noted for great audience loyalty.

== Compositions ==
As a composer, Kennedy's works have been performed worldwide, including at San Francisco's Other Minds Festival, Paris Festival d’Automne, Aspekte Salzburg, the Zurich June Festival, London’s Wigmore Hall Piano Fest, the Singapore Arts Festival, and the Kanagawa Arts Festival. He has been commissioned by many organizations including the Santa Fe Opera and the Sarasota Opera.

== Select works ==
Chant (1998) for three percussion

Collective Sentiments (1998) for variable instrumentation

Fanfare for the Common Gun (1994) for the Brady Bill for handguns

Nostalgic Patterns (1995) for variable instrumentation

Animals in Distress (1995) for animal distress calls

Exigencies of Inner Rhythm (1998) for four percussion

One Body (1998) chamber cantata for countertenor/baritone, string quartet, two percussion

Someday (2000) for a cappella choir

Guadalupe (2000) musicdrama for soprano, chorus, small orchestra

The Language of Birds (2004) opera with libretto by Peter M. Krask

Storm and Stress (2005) for orchestra

First Deconstruction (in plastic) (2006) for two percussion

Recession and Procession (2006) for brass quintet

Trinity (2007) chamber opera with libretto by Andrea Fellows Walters

Horn Concerto (2007) solo horn with large orchestra

BAGHDAD (2007) variations on B-A-G-H-D-A-D for string orchestra

Garden Winds (2011) for chamber orchestra

Island in Time (2012) for chamber ensemble

iPhone 4tet (2012) for four smartphones

Passages (2013) for chamber orchestra

Open Share (2015) for orchestra

blessing the boats (2016) for choir and orchestra

== Discography ==
Chant on Ten Years of Essential Music (1998)

One Body (2000)

Someday (2007)

Naturali Periclitati (2009)

Even the Stones Breathe (2013)
