= Shigetsugu =

- Gender: Male

Origin
- Origin: Japanese
- Meaning: Different meanings depending on the kanji used

Shigetsugu (written: 重次) is a masculine Japanese given name. Notable people with the name include:

- Honda Shigetsugu (本多 重次; 1529–1596), Japanese samurai
- Yonekura Shigetsugu (died 1575), Japanese samurai
