= Omar (opera) =

2022 opera by Rhiannon Giddens and Michael Abels

- Opera by Rhiannon Giddens and Michael Abels
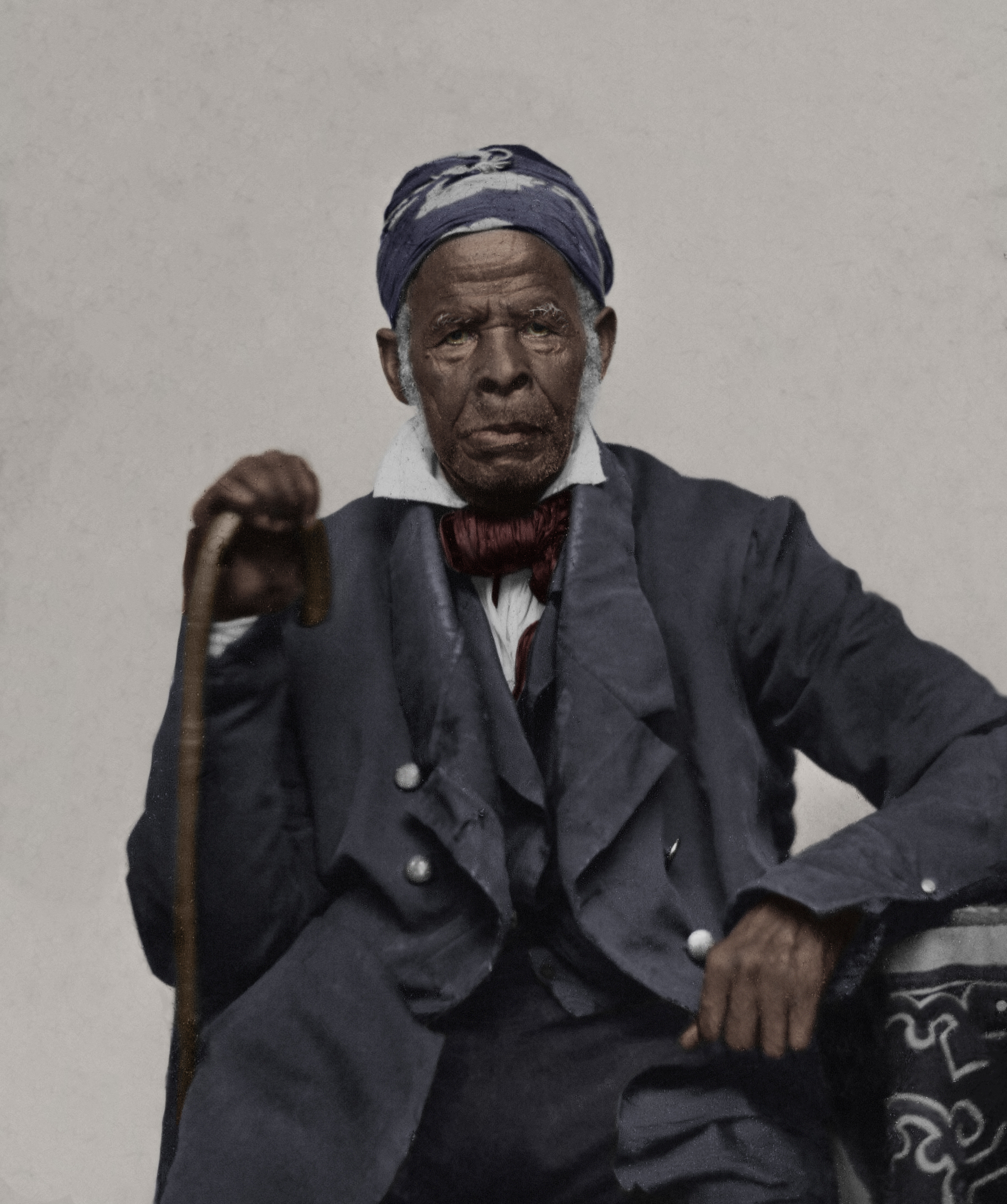
- Restored and colorized ambrotype of Omar ibn Said, c. 1850
- Librettist: Rhiannon Giddens
- Language: English
- Based on: the autobiography of Omar ibn Said
- Premiere: May 27, 2022; Spoleto Festival USA

Omar is an American opera, composed by Rhiannon Giddens and Michael Abels, with a libretto by Giddens. It had its world premiere at the Spoleto Festival USA in 2022. It had its West Coast premiere at Los Angeles Opera in October 2022. It was performed at Carolina Performing Arts in February 2023, and had its New England premiere at Boston Lyric Opera in May 2023.

The opera's plot loosely follows the life of Omar ibn Said, and is based on his autobiography A Muslim American Slave: The Life of Omar ibn Said, written in 1831, mostly in Arabic. It is the only known memoir written by a slave in America in Arabic. The work was translated into English by Ala Alryyes and published by the University of Wisconsin Press in 2011.

Omar won the 2023 Pulitzer Prize for Music.

== Background ==
Omar ibn Said was born and raised in Futa Toro, an Islamic state located in the part of West Africa that is now Senegal. His family was wealthy and he was highly educated as a Muslim scholar. He was captured by slavers in 1807 at the age of 37 and was taken to America to be sold in the Charleston slave market. Initially purchased by a harsh master, he escaped after two years and traveled to Fayetteville, North Carolina. There he was captured and jailed, but ultimately sold to planter James Owen. Owen was impressed by ibn Said's education, since very few slaves even knew how to read and write. Owen attempted to convert him to Christianity and provided him with a Bible and other books. He also urged him to write his memoirs, which he did in 1831. He wrote at least thirteen other Arabic documents, mostly on history and theology. Ibn Said lived until his mid-90s and died in 1864, still enslaved.

== Synopsis ==
The opera, in two acts, follows ibn Said's life loosely, as Giddens maintained that her libretto was only one possible telling of a life about which so much is still unknown. She wrote in the program for the premiere: "Who was Omar? We will never really know. This Omar is merely one of a thousand different possible interpretations of his writings and what we know of his life." Act One contains five scenes. The first shows him in his village along with his mother Fatima, a spiritual matriarch of the village. His brother Abdul warns them that slavers are nearby and urges them to flee, but it is too late; the slavers overrun the village, capturing Omar and killing his mother. Scene two is aboard a slave ship, where several prisoners describe their own situation and pray to survive the voyage. Scene three is set in the Charleston slave market, where Omar meets a slave for sale named Julie. Omar's kufi, a Muslim cap, reminds her of her father, and she retrieves his kufi and keeps it. She is planning to escape and return to a gentler master in Fayetteville, and urges Omar to do the same if he can. He observes an auction where a child is separated from his parents despite the father's pleading. In a vision, Omar's mother tells him to cover for Julie so she can escape. He creates a distraction and she escapes. He is then sold to an abusive master named Johnson. Scene four is on Johnson's plantation, where Omar is sent to pick cotton in the fields. In scene five, he dreams of his mother urging him to escape, which he does, intending to go to Fayetteville.

Act Two also contains five scenes. In the first scene Omar, who was caught, is imprisoned in the Fayetteville County Jail, where he has covered the walls of his cell with Arabic prayers and verses from the Quran. The townspeople are intrigued by him and his writing. The plantation owner Owen is urged by his daughter Eliza to buy Omar. Owen talks to Omar about his background and thinks he might be able to convert him to Christianity. In the second scene, Omar is introduced to the other slaves, including Julie who has returned to the plantation and is impressed that Omar has followed her advice. She gives him back his kufi, singing "My daddy wore a cap like yours." Scene three takes place in a study room that Owen has given to Omar. Owen gives him a Christian Bible written in Arabic. Scene four finds Omar under a tree reading his new Bible and praying to Allah to understand the meaning of his life journey. He recites Psalm 23, reinterpreting it from the point of view of an enslaved Muslim. In scene five Julie urges Omar to write a book. So does the spirit of Fatima, telling him to write about his experiences and his faith. The company joins Omar in a song in praise of Allah.

== Roles ==
Role	Voice type	Premiere cast (May 27, 2022) (Note: Conducted by John Kennedy)
Omar	Tenor	Jamez McCorkle
Fatima	Mezzo Soprano	Cheryse McLeod Lewis
Abdul / Abe	Baritone	Michael Redding
Julie	Soprano	Laquita Mitchell
Auctioneer / Taylor	Tenor	Adam Klein
Katie Ellen / The Caller	Mezzo Soprano	Catherine Anne Daniel
Johnson / Owen	Baritone	Malcolm MacKenzie
Eliza	Soprano	Rebecca Jo Loeb

== Performance history ==
The opera was commissioned in 2019 by the Spoleto Festival USA and Carolina Performing Arts. The commission was given to Rhiannon Giddens, who wrote both the music and the libretto, with Michael Abels as co-composer expanding and orchestrating the music. The premiere, initially planned for 2020, had to be postponed twice due to COVID-19. The opera finally had its world premiere on May 27, 2022, conducted by John Kennedy, as the opening work at that year's Spoleto Festival. The production was directed by Kaneza Schaal, with Christopher Myers as the production designer, Amy Rubin as the scenic designer, Lucrecia Birceno and Alejandro Fajardo as lighting designers, Joshua Higgason as projection designer, and April M Hickman and Micheline Russell-Brown as co-costume designers The Spoleto Festival USA Chorus, prepared by Vinroy D. Brown, Jr., served as the anchoring ensemble. The premiere took place less than a mile from the site of the slave market where Omar ibn Said was sold. Tenor Jamez McCorkle portrayed Omar in the premiere and subsequent productions by Los Angeles Opera in October 2022, Carolina Performing Arts in February 2023, Boston Lyric Opera in May 2023, and San Francisco Opera in November 2023.

== Reception ==
Joshua Barone of The New York Times described the opera as "(m)oving, joyous and in its final moments intensely spiritual." Anastasia Tsioulcas of NPR described the work as "a thoroughly American opera" and "a broadly American story". Rupa Shenoy, speaking on Morning Edition, said "A new opera brings to light a remarkable, long-buried American story of an enslaved man who wrote his memoirs in Arabic for future generations to read." Reviewing the premiere, James L. Paulk said, "Omar is the most important new work to emerge from Spoleto, at least since the Menotti era. It is an important story, told in a way that is gripping and beautiful." Charles McNulty, theater critic for the Los Angeles Times, summarized the opera by saying "Omar invites audiences to remember the lives of all those whose stories were unwritten by considering the miracle of one who managed to transmit his own. This is painful material but also triumphant, despite the impossibility of a happy ending. Omar lives again, thanks to the unconquerable power of his words, now borne aloft by the music of history." Richard S. Ginell of San Francisco Classical Voice described the Los Angeles production as "a profoundly moving spectacle".

Omar won the 2023 Pulitzer Prize for Music. The Pulitzer committee described the work as "an innovative and compelling opera about enslaved people brought to North America from Muslim countries, a musical work that respectfully represents African as well as African American traditions, expanding the language of the operatic form while conveying the humanity of those condemned to bondage."
