= Fake Famous =

2021 documentary film by Nick Bilton

- Film poster
- Directed by: Nick Bilton
- Written by: Nick Bilton
- Starring: Christopher Bailey; Dominique Druckman; Wylie Heiner
- Music by: Michael Abels
- Production company: HBO Documentary Films
- Distributed by: HBO
- Release date: February 1, 2021
- Running time: 87 minutes
- Country: United States
- Language: English

Fake Famous is a 2021 documentary film directed by Nick Bilton. It is a social experiment involving three non-famous people who attempt to become social media influencers by "faking" fame. They use tactics such as buying followers and faking a luxurious lifestyle. The documentary follows their progress and discusses issues related to social media.

== Reception ==
On Rotten Tomatoes, a review aggregator, the film received a score of 73% based on 15 reviews. Journalists described the documentary as a social experiment, interesting, and condescending.

== See also ==
- Eighth Grade, a 2018 film with a similar theme.
- Ingrid Goes West, a 2017 film with a similar theme.
- Internet Famous, a 2016 mockumentary film with a similar theme.
- Not Okay, a 2022 film with a similar theme.
