= IV for Percussion Ensemble =

Ensemble by Johanna Magdalena Beyer

IV is the fourth movement in the complete five-movement work titled PERCUSSION composed by Johanna Magdalena Beyer from October to December 1935. The complete work, PERCUSSION, is published by Smith Publications.

IV for Percussion Ensemble by German composer Johanna Beyer is a work for percussion ensemble that involves the use of nine different unspecified instruments. All other aspects of the work, including dynamics, rhythms, articulations, and, to an extent, tempo, are defined.

== Instrumentation ==
IV is scored for nine different playing surfaces. These surfaces are not defined by the composer. The director of the ensemble performing this work will choose instrumentation that works best with each other for this piece.

== Analysis ==
The time signature is 7/8, and one player has an ostinato eighth-note rhythm controlling all tempo and major dynamic changes. This piece uses rhythms, dynamics, and accents to build structure, and shows an exposition, rise, climax, and resolution using pyramids of voices. The rhythmic structure of IV is complex because each time a rhythm repeats, another rhythm crosses it, and continues to add crossed rhythms until the midway point of the section, where the cross rhythms uncross themselves and starts again. This pattern happens a total of six times. Performance time for this piece is about 2 minutes and 15 seconds.

== Performances ==
The first known complete performance of PERCUSSION was performed by the Southern Illinois University Carbondale Percussion Group (SIUCPG), conducted by Ron Coulter, at the 5th Annual Outside the Box New Music Festival (Carbondale, Illinois) on 3 April 2011. That program included world premiers of Beyer's PERCUSSION, Strive, Horizons, and Daniel Kessner's A Knocktet. As well as rare performances of Colin McPhee's Kachapi Mas, Lou Harrison's Oriental, Franziska Boas’ Changing Tensions, and Jose Ardevol's Preludio a 11.

== Composition ==
Published in 1936, IV was one of the first major works for percussion ensemble, and the only work published during Beyer's lifetime. It is unknown why Beyer chose the title "IV". Beyer's compositional style focuses on experimental music and American contemporary music, which includes new music, atonal music, music with chance operations, and music for percussion. Beyer emigrated from Germany to New York City at a time when interest in new music was starting to grow rapidly. Beyer surrounded herself with people such as Henry Cowell, John Cage, and Charles Seeger, and studied music composition with them. Cowell was an innovative composer, using abnormal playing techniques to create new sounds from instruments, and Beyer took Cowell's percussion class at The New School, where Cowell's influence may have been her starting point for creating music for percussion ensemble. Beyer is one of the first composers to focus on music for percussion ensemble, and popularized the concept of music for percussion ensemble with IV as well as other of her many later works for percussion.

== Other percussion ensemble works by Johanna Beyer ==
- Percussion Suite in 3 Movements (1933)
- PERCUSSION (1935)
- March for 30, Percussion Instruments (1939)
- Percussion, opus 14 (1939)
- Three Movements for Percussion (1939)
- Waltz for Percussion (1939)
- Strive (July 1941)
- Horizons (April 1942)

== Recordings ==
- "ORIGINS: forgotten percussion works, vol. 1", Percussion Art Ensemble, directed by Ron Coulter, (Kreating SounD KSD 4, 2012)

== Sources ==
- Coulter, Ron. "Forgotten Percussion Works: Johanna Magdalena Beyer" Percussive Notes Online Research Edition, Vol. 1, pgs. 5-23, December 2016.
