= Johanna Beyer =

American composer

- Born: Johanna Magdalena Beyer; July 11, 1888; Leipzig, German Empire
- Died: January 9, 1944 (aged 55); New York City, New York, U.S.
- Era: 20th-century music

Johanna Magdalena Beyer (July 11, 1888 – January 9, 1944) was a German-American composer and pianist. Among her best known compositions is IV for Percussion Ensemble (1935), the only work published during her lifetime.

== Biography ==
Johanna Beyer was born in Leipzig, Germany, but very little is known about her life prior to her move to the United States in 1923. She sang for three years at the Leipziger Singakademie and graduated from the Deutscher Konservatorien and Musikseminare, having studied piano, harmony, theory, counterpoint, singing, and dancing. Colleagues in New York recalled that her pianism and musicianship were excellent and that her musical training seemed traditional and solid. She spent 1911–1914 in America, though nothing is known of her activities during those years. Returning to the U.S. in 1923 (according to the biographical notes she provided in a Composers' Forum concert program), she studied at the Mannes College of Music, receiving two degrees by 1928. She taught piano to support herself, and may have taught at Greenwich House Music School, but struggled to make ends meet, resorting at times to WPA work and Ladies Home Aid. In the late 1920s or early thirties she began studying with Ruth Crawford, Charles Seeger, and Dane Rudhyar and in 1934 took Henry Cowell's percussion class at the New School for Social Research. Her musical life during these years was intertwined with Seeger, Crawford, Cowell, John Cage, and others in this modernist circle such as Jessie Baetz, a now-forgotten composer and painter who studied with Beyer. Her most intimate friendship was with Cowell; surviving correspondence reveals a tumultuous, and possibly romantic, relationship between the two composers. Beyer acted as Cowell's informal agent and secretary from 1936 to 1941 on a voluntary basis (only receiving partial compensation in 1941).

Though she was largely ignored as a composer, she did have a number of important performances. The first was at the New School for Social Research in 1933, where her Three Songs for Soprano, Piano, and Percussion were performed. A year later, the second movement from her Suite for Clarinet and Bassoon, performed in one of Henry Cowell's New Music Society of California concerts in San Francisco, was perceived as a "doleful dull duet." Aaron Copland reviewed a New Music Quarterly Recording of the movement. John Cage performed two movements of her "Three Movements for Percussion" in his northwestern percussion tours during the late 1930s. In 1936 her skills in multiple media came to the fore in her play, The Modern Composer, for which she wrote the lyrics, composed the incidental music, choreographed the modern ballet, designed and created the costumes, slides, and advertisements, directed the production, and performed the piano part. The play was performed under the auspices of the Federal Music Project at the Central Manhattan Music Center, but manuscript sources for it have not yet been found. Her music was performed twice in the New York Composers' Forum, in 1936 and 1937. Her work was also part of the music event in the art competition at the 1932 Summer Olympics. In 1988, New York's Essential Music revived her music for the centenary of her birth, presenting two concerts surveying her work.

Beyer battled with amyotrophic lateral sclerosis (ALS), also known as Lou Gehrig's disease, during the final years of her life. She died in New York City, New York, in 1944.

Some of her scores are available in recopied, annotated editions through the Frog Peak/Johanna Beyer Project. The editing and recopying work has been contributed on a voluntary basis by people interested in the project. Three of Beyer's percussion ensemble works, PERCUSSION, Strive, and Horizons, are published by Smith Publications.

== Musical style ==
Much of Beyer's music, particularly that written between 1931 and 1939, reflects the aesthetics of the American "ultra-modernists," a circle which included Ruth Crawford Seeger, Charles Seeger, Henry Cowell, Dane Rudhyar and Carl Ruggles. Many of Beyer's works are exemplary of dissonant counterpoint, a theoretical compositional system developed by Charles Seeger and Cowell and most famously articulated in the works of Ruth Crawford Seeger. However, Beyer developed her own distinctive gestures and procedures that distinguished her music from that of her colleagues. Her compositions are characterized by an economic use of resources, balanced and well-constructed forms, "a unique sense of humor and whimsy," and a commitment to experimentation.

Although her music was overlooked during her lifetime and for decades after her death, it was some of the most experimental and prophetic work created during the 1930s. Music of the Spheres (1938) is the first known work scored for electronic instruments by a female composer. The fourth movements of her two clarinet suites (1932) are some of the earliest examples of a pitch-based approach to rhythmic processes, which would not be fully explored again until the late 1940s by composers such as Elliott Carter and Conlon Nancarrow. Several of her works anticipate the minimalist music of the 1960s, most notably the fourth movement of her first String Quartet. She included tone clusters in Clusters, a suite for solo piano, and the duet, Movement for Two Pianos. The large clusters in these works often require the pianist to play the keys with their forearms.

Perhaps Beyer's most important and overlooked contribution to the development of new music is her repertoire for percussion ensemble. The Percussion Suite of 1933 is one of the earliest examples in this genre and differs from those of her contemporaries in that it "explores the understated and quiet expressive possibilities of percussion." Other percussion pieces from the 1930s include IV (1935), the March for Thirty Percussion Instruments (1939), which John Kennedy calls one of the "most gorgeous orchestrations for percussion ensemble ever composed," and the Three Movements for Percussion (1939). All of her percussion music is distinguished from that of her contemporaries by its sense of humor, and "emphasis on process over more purely rhythmic exploration."

== Works ==
Percussion

- Percussion Suite in 3 Movements (1933)
- PERCUSSION (1935)
- IV (1935) (IV is the fourth movement of the composition, PERCUSSION)
- March for 30, Percussion Instruments (1939)
- Percussion, opus 14 (1939)
- Three Movements for Percussion (1939)
- Waltz for Percussion (1939)
- Strive (July 1941)
- Horizons (April 1942)

Chamber works

- Suite for Clarinet I (1932)
- Suite for Clarinet Ib (1932)
- Suite for Clarinet and Bassoon (1933)
- Sonata for Clarinet and Piano (1936)
- Suite for Bass Clarinet and Piano (1936?)
- Movement for Double Bass and Piano (1936)
- Movement for Two Pianos (1936)
- Suite for Violin and Piano (1937)
- Suite for Oboe and Bassoon (1937)
- Six Pieces for Oboe and Piano (1939)
- Quintet for Woodwinds (1933)
- Movement for Woodwinds (1938)
- Trio for Woodwinds (194?)
- String Quartet No. 1 (1933–34)
- String Quartet No. 2 (1936)
- Movement for String Quartet ("Dance") (1938)
- String Quartet No. 4 (1943?)
- "Music of the Spheres" from Status Quo (1938)

For solo piano:

- Gebrauchs-Musik (1934)
- Clusters (or, New York Waltzes) (1936)
- Winter Ade and five other folk song settings (1936)
- Dissonant Counterpoint (193?)
- Suite for Piano (1939)
- Sonatina in C (1943)
- Prelude and Fugue (in C Major) (no date)
- Piano-Book, Classic-Romantic-Modern (no date), includes the well-known "Bees"

Songs:

- Sky-Pieces (1933)
- Three Songs for Piano, Percussion and Soprano (the "Sandburg Songs") (Timber Moon; Stars, Songs, Faces; Summer Grass) (soprano, piano, percussion) (1933)
- Ballad of the Star-Eater (soprano and clarinet) (1934)
- Three Songs for Soprano and Clarinet (Total Eclipse; Universal-Local; To Be) (1934)
- Have Faith! (soprano and flute) (3 versions) (1936–37)

Large Mixed Ensembles

- March (14 instruments) (1935)
- Cyrnab (chamber orchestra) (1937)
- Elation (concert band) (1938)
- Reverence (wind ensemble) (1938)

Choir

- The Robin in the Rain (1935)
- The Federal Music Project (1936)
- The Main—Deep (1937)
- The People, Yes (1937)
- The Composers' Forum Laboratory (1937)

Orchestra

- Fragment for Chamber Orchestra (1937)
- Symphonic Suite (1937)
- Dance for Full Orchestra from Status Quo (1938)
- Symphonic Movement I (1939)
- Symphonic Opus 3 (1939)
- Symphonic Opus 5 (1940)
- Symphonic Movement II (1941)

== Selected discography ==
- "ORIGINS: forgotten percussion works, vol. 1", Percussion Art Ensemble, directed by Ron Coulter, (Kreating SounD KSD 4, 2012)
- Restless, Endless, Tactless: Johanna Beyer and the Birth of American Percussion Music, Meehan/Perkins Duo and the Baylor Percussion Group, (New World Records 80711, 2011)
- Dissonant Counterpoint, I–VIII; Gebrauchs-Musik, on Nine Preludes, Ruth Crawford/Johanna Beyer, Sarah Cahill, piano (New Albion, NA 114 CD, 2001)
- Ballad of the Star-Eater, Merlyn Quaife, soprano, Craig Hill, clarinet, on Sticky Melodies, (New World Records 80678-2, 2008)
- Bees, Peter Dumsday, piano, on Sticky Melodies, (New World Records 80678-2, 2008)
- Clarinet Sonata II in B flat, Pat Okeefe, clarinet, on If Tigers Were Clouds (Zeitgeist, Innova 589, 2003)
- The Federal Music Project, Astra Choir, John McCaughey, conductor, on Sticky Melodies, (New World Records 80678-2, 2008)
- Movement for Double Bass and Piano, Nicholas Synot, double bass, Kim Bastin, piano
- Movement for Two Pianos, Peter Dumsday, piano 1, Kim Bastin, piano 2, on Sticky Melodies, (New World Records 80678-2, 2008)
- Music of the Spheres (1938), The Electronic Weasel Ensemble, on New Music for Electronic and Recorded Media: Women in Electronic Music (CRI CD 728, 1977, 1997)
- Sonatina in C, Peter Dumsday, piano, on Sticky Melodies, (New World Records 80678-2, 2008)
- String Quartet no. 1, Miwako Abe, violin 1, Aaron Barnden, violin 2, Erkki Veltheim, viola, Rosanne Hunt, cello, on Sticky Melodies, (New World Records 80678-2, 2008)
- String Quartet no. 2, Miwako Abe, violin 1, Aaron Barnden, violin 2, Erkki Veltheim, viola, Rosanne Hunt, cello, on Sticky Melodies, (New World Records 80678-2, 2008)
- Suite for Clarinet I, Daniel Goode, clarinet, on Sticky Melodies, (New World Records 80678-2, 2008)
- Suite for Clarinet Ib, Craig Hill, clarinet, on Sticky Melodies, (New World Records 80678-2, 2008)
- Suite for Violin and Piano, Miwako Abe, violin, Michael Kieran Harvey, piano, on Works for Violin by George Antheil, Johanna Beyer, Henry Cowell, Ruth Crawford, Charles Dodge, David Mahler, Larry Polansky, Stefan Wolpe (New World Records 80-641, 2006)
- Three Pieces for Choir: The Main Deep; The Composers Forum Laboratory; The People, Yes!, Astra Choir, John McCaughey, conductor, on Sticky Melodies, (New World Records 80678-2, 2008)
- Three Songs for Soprano and Clarinet, Merlyn Quaife, soprano, Craig Hill, clarinet, on Sticky Melodies, (New World Records 80678-2, 2008)
- IV, performed by Essential Music, on The Aerial no. 3, (Non Sequitur Recordings, 1991)
- Suite for Clarinet and Bassoon, movements 2 and 4 only, Rosario Mazzeo, clarinet, Raymond Allard, bassoon (New Music Quarterly Recordings 1413 side A [78rpm], 1938).

== Sources ==
- Beal, Amy. Johanna Beyer. Urbana, Chicago, and Springfield: University of Illinois Press, 2015.
- Beal, Amy. "'Her Whimsy and Originality Really Amount to Genius': New Biographical Research on Johanna Beyer," American Music Review 38/1 (Fall 2008), 1, 4-5, 12-13.
- Boland, Marguerite. "Experimentation and Process in the Music of Johanna Beyer." Viva Voce 76 (2007),
- Boland, Marguerite. "Le langage musical de Johanna Beyer." Proceedings from Le Colloque Des Ponts vers L'Amérique I, Centre de recherches sur les arts et le language, EHESS (Paris, France), December 2006. http://cral.ehess.fr/docannexe/file/1077/marguerite_boland_le_langage_musical_de_johanna_beyer.pdf
- Boland, Marguerite, and Larry Polansky. "Tempo Melodies in the Johanna Beyer Clarinet Suites (Fourth Movements)". Larry Polansky's Dartmouth website (accessed September 20, 2015).
- Coulter, Ron. "Forgotten Percussion Works: Johanna Magdalena Beyer" Percussive Notes Online Research Edition, Vol. 1, pgs. 5-23, December 2016.
- de Graaf, Melissa. "Intersections of Gender and Modernism in the Music of Johanna Beyer," Institute for Studies in American Music Newsletter 33/2 (Spring 2004), 8–9, 15 http://depthome.brooklyn.cuny.edu/isam/.
- de Graaf, Melissa. "'Never Call Us Lady Composers': Gendered Receptions in the New York Composers' Forum, 1935-1940," American Music 26/3 (Fall 2008), 277–308.
- de Graaf, Melissa. "The Reception of an Ultra-Modernist: Ruth Crawford's Experience in the Composers' Forum," in Ruth Crawford Seeger's Worlds: Innovation and Tradition in Twentieth-century American Music, eds. Ellie Hisama & Ray Allen. University of Rochester Press, 2006.
- Hinkle-Turner, Elizabeth. "Lady Ada's Offspring: Some Women Pioneers in Music Technology," in Frau Musica (nova): Komponieren heute/Composing today, ed. Martina Homma, 25–33. Sinzig: Studio-Verlag, 2000.
- Hinkle-Turner, Elizabeth. Women Composers and Music Technology in the United States. Aldershot, Hants; Burlington, VT: Ashgate Publishers, 2006.
- Lumsden, Rachel. "'The Pulse of Life Today': Borrowing in Johanna Beyer's String Quartet No. 2," American Music 35/3 (Fall 2017), 303–342.
- Polansky, Larry "The Choral and Chamber Music of Johanna Magdalena Beyer". Liner notes to Johanna Beyer - Sticky Melodies. New World Records.
- Polansky, Larry, and John Kennedy. "'Total Eclipse': The Music of Johanna Magdalena Beyer: An Introduction and Preliminary Annotated Checklist," The Musical Quarterly 80/4 (1996), 719–78.
- Reese, Kirsten. "Ruhelos: Annäherung an Johanna Magdalena Beyer," Musiktexte: Zeitschrift fur Neue Musik, nos. 81–82 (1999): 6–15.
