= Laquita Mitchell =

American operatic soprano (born 1976/1977)

Laquita Mitchell (born 1976/1977) is an American operatic soprano. She won the Metropolitan Opera National Council Auditions in 2004. She is known for creating the role of Julie in Omar by Rhiannon Giddens, for starring in performances of La bohème, Carmen, Aida, Don Giovanni, and The Marriage of Figaro in leading American and international houses, for many international performances first as Clara and later as Bess in Porgy and Bess, including a DVD with the San Francisco Opera with Eric Owens as Porgy. She notably performed Paul Moravec's Sanctuary Road many times, and recorded the piece live at Carnegie Hall in an album that was nominated for the 63rd Annual Grammy Awards.

== Biography ==
Mitchell was a young artist at the San Francisco Opera's Merola Opera Program in 2002.

She won the Metropolitan Opera National Council Auditions in 2004. She won the Sara Tucker Award in 2004. She won first prize in Opera in the International Hans Gabor Belvedere Singing Competition in 2003. She was also First Prize Winner of the Houston Grand Opera Eleanor McCollum Competition for Young Singers, as well as the winner of the Audience Choice award.

In 2003 she sang in the premiere of The Little Prince by Rachel Portman at the Houston Grand Opera.

In 2004 she sang the role of Miss Alice Ford in Verdi's Falstaff with Wolf Trap Opera.

In 2005 she created the role of Myrrhine in the premiere of Mark Adamo's Lysistrata, or the Nude Goddess at Houston Grand Opera.

In 2006 she sang Micaëla in Carmen with the New York City Opera. She also sang the role at Cincinnati Opera, Opera Pacific, and in an adaptation with On Site Opera at Caramoor.

In 2008 she sang in the premiere of August 4, 1964 by Steven Stucky with the Dallas Symphony Orchestra.

in 2008 she sang the role of Leonora in Il Trovatore with Nashville Opera.

In 2006 she was featured at the Richard Tucker Rising Stars Concert at Alice Tully Hall.

In 2009 she performed as Bess in Porgy and Bess at San Francisco Opera. Her performance of Porgy and Bess with Eric Owens as Porgy was distributed as a DVD and televised. She also sang the role of Bess in 2011 at the Tanglewood Music Festival with the Boston Symphony Orchestra, at the Atlanta Opera, Grange Park Opera, The Baltimore Symphony Orchestra, Budapesti Nyari Festival, The Santa Barbara Symphony Orchestra, and with the BSO again in 2012. She sang the role of Clara in 2009 at Lyric Opera of Chicago, Washington National Opera, Los Angeles Opera, Opéra-Comique, Théâtre de Caen, Festival Internacional de Música y Danza de Granada, Théâtres de la Ville de Luxembourg.

In 2010 she starred as Mimí in La bohème with Utah Opera. She also sang the role with Cincinnati Opera, and the Greater Bridgeport Symphony. She sang the role of Musetta at Los Angeles Opera in 2007.

She sang the role of Donna Elvira in Don Giovanni with the Opera New Jersey and with Portland Opera in 2006.

In 2011 she sang the leading role, Violetta, in La Traviata with New York City Opera.

In 2013 she sang Alberto Ginastera's Cantata para la América Mágica with the New World Symphony Percussion Fellows in Florida.

In 2014 Mitchell sang in David Lang's The Difficulty of Crossing a Field, subsequently recording it in 2015.

She sang with the New York Philharmonic in 2015 in a tribute concert created by Eric Owens called "In Their Footsteps". She also sang a concert with Eric Owens with the Cleveland Orchestra in 2013.

In 2019 she recorded The Ballad of the Brown King and selected songs by Margaret Bonds with The Dessoff Choirs and Orchestra and Malcolm J. Merriweather, alongside Noah Stewart, Lucia Bradford, and Ashley Jackson.

In 2020 she sang in Paul Moravec's Sanctuary Road. The piece was recorded live at Carnegie Hall with the Oratorio Society of New York. The album was nominated for a Grammy. The piece was also performed at Virginia Opera, Bach Festival Society of Winter Park, Princeton Pro Musica, Charlston Symphony Orchestra, Buffalo Philharmonic Orchestra, and the Columbus Symphony Orchestra.

In 2021 during the enforced pandemic closure of David Geffen Hall, she gave open air concerts with the Harlem Chamber Players and a New York Philharmonic string quartet presented by the New York Philharmonic as a part of their NY Phil Bandwagon 2 initiative. She also performed with Stephanie Blythe in On Site Opera's online Lesson Plan.

In 2022 she starred in Tom Cipullo's Josephine at New Orleans Opera and at Opera Colorado in 2019.

She was broadcast as a part of the WQXR Christmas Concert in 2022.

In 2023 she sang the role of Contessa in The Marriage of Figaro with New Orleans Opera and with the Washington Opera Society.

In 2023 she sang in the concert "Marin Alsop: American Voices" with the Cincinnati May Festival.

In 2024 she sang the role of Vereveine in Pauline Viardot's Le Dernier Sorcier at the Fischer Center at Bard Summerscape.

She sang Verdi's Requiem with the Buffalo Philharmonic Orchestra in 2023, and in Beethoven's Symphony No. 9 with the Chattanooga Symphony and Opera, and Mahler's Symphony No. 4 with Rhode Island Philharmonic Orchestra in 2021.

She created the role of Julie in Omar by Rhiannon Giddens at the Spoleto Festival USA.

in 2024 she sang as part of the Julia Perry Centennial Celebration and Festival in New York.

In 2025 she sang the title role in Aida at Dayton Opera.

She sang in 2025 at the Cleveland Orchestra's 45th Martin Luther King, Jr. Celebration Concert.

Mitchell is a member of the voice faculty of Mannes School of Music as well as the Conservatory of Music of Brooklyn College.

== Discography ==
- 2026 Allison Loggins-Hull: Patchwork (Cleveland Soloists / Allison Loggins-Hull / Laquita Mitchell)
- 2020 Paul Moravec: Sanctuary Road (Laquita Mitchell / Kent Tritle)
- 2019 Margaret Bonds: The Ballad of the Brown King & Selected Songs (Dessoff Choirs / Dessoff Orchestra / Ashley Jackson / Malcolm J. Merriweather / Laquita Mitchell)
- 2015 David Lang & Mac Wellman: The Difficulty of Crossing a Field (Harlem Quartet)

== DVD ==
- 2009 Porgy and Bess (San Francisco Opera production) DVD and Blu-Ray
