= Nick Bilton =

British-American journalist, author and filmmaker

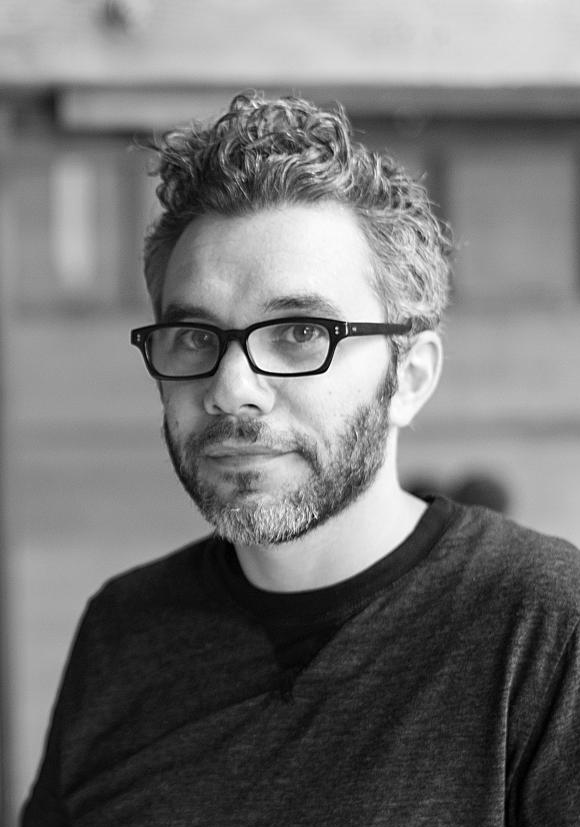
- Bilton in 2014
- Born: 1976 or 1977 (age 49–50); Darlington, County Durham, England
- Education: School of Visual Arts; The New School; Marjory Stoneman Douglas High School
- Occupations: Journalist, author and filmmaker
- Employer: CBS News
- Notable work: Hatching Twitter (2013); American Kingpin (2017); Fake Famous (2021)

Nicholas Bilton (born 1976) is a British-American journalist, author, and filmmaker. He was named executive producer of 60 Minutes on 28 May 2026. He has also been a special correspondent at Vanity Fair, author of two New York Times-bestselling books, and a screenwriter. He worked at the Times for 13 years, then at Vanity Fair for 10.

== Early life and education ==
Nicholas Bilton was born in Darlington, England, to Terence Bilton and his wife Sandra (née Jacobs). Bilton's parents were from Jewish families - although Bilton's mother gave up Judaism as a teenager - and together they had three children before they split up. Bilton's mother later remarried. Nick moved to the United States and attended Marjory Stoneman Douglas High School in Parkland, Florida.

Bilton has described some of his initial jobs prior to starting his career: as a restaurant employee, garment industry courier, hair salon worker, and as a birthday party performer. He also studied at The New School and the School of Visual Arts, both in New York City.

== Career ==
Bilton worked at The New York Times from 2003 to 2016, as a design editor in the newsroom and a researcher in the research and development labs, later becoming a technology columnist and the lead writer for the Bits blog. While at the Times, CBS News offered him a position, which he declined.

In 2016, he left The New York Times to become a special correspondent for Vanity Fair, where he wrote features and columns. He co-wrote the 2015–2019 Vanity Fair New Establishment List.

Also in 2016, Bilton fought, and won, a First Amendment lawsuit when he was deposed to testify in a class action lawsuit against Twitter. That followed an article he wrote in Vanity Fair, “Twitter Is Betting Everything on Jack Dorsey. Will It Work?” alleging that the company knowingly deceived investors in 2015 about its users’ daily and monthly engagement with the site.

In 2021, HBO released Fake Famous, a documentary film Bilton wrote, directed and produced about social media and influencer culture. Bilton is also credited as a staff writer on HBO's 2023 series The Idol.

In 2025 it was announced that Bilton would write the screenplay for a new Martin Scorsese film, starring Dwayne Johnson, Leonardo DiCaprio and Emily Blunt, set to be staged in Hawaii. Bilton will also produce the film.

On May 28, 2026, CBS News editor-in-chief Bari Weiss tapped Bilton to become the executive producer of the network's flagship 60 Minutes news magazine, his first assignment at a weekly news program. During the first team meeting with Bilton, veteran CBS correspondent Scott Pelley voiced concerns about Bilton’s lack of experience in a newsroom, and his belief that Bari Weiss and CBS were ruining 60 Minutes. The following day, Bilton fired Pelley. The day after that, Bilton sent a memorandum to 60 Minutes staff describing the values and vision that he seeks to maintain at the show.

Bilton has been an adjunct professor at the New York University Tisch School of the Arts. As part of NYU's Interactive Telecommunications Program (ITP), he has taught two courses called "1, 2, 10," and "Telling Stories with Data, Sensors and Humans".

== Books ==
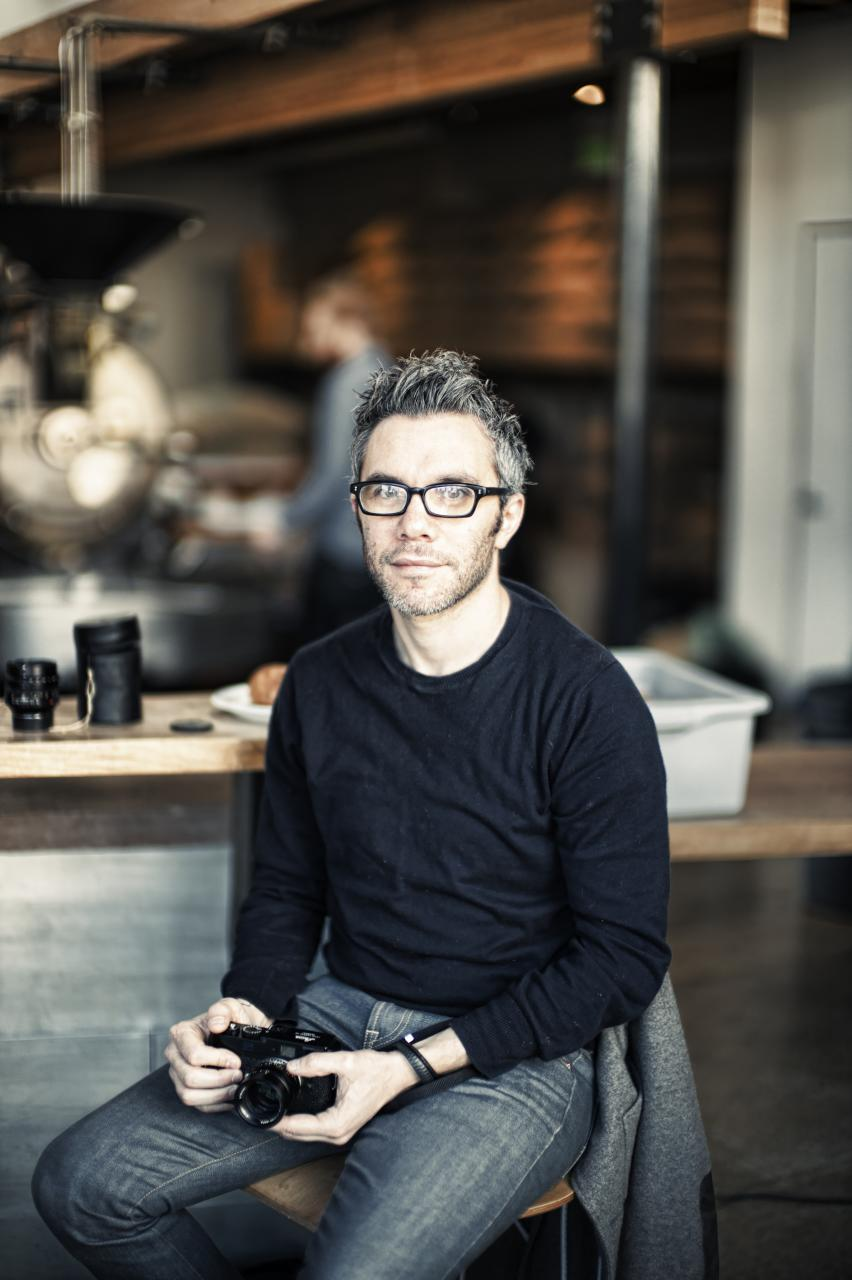
In 2012

Bilton is the author of three books:

- Hatching Twitter. A True Story of Money, Power, Friendship and Betrayal. Penguin Portfolio, New York, 2010. ISBN 978-1-59184-601-7.
- I Live in the Future & Here's How It Works: Why Your World, Work, and Brain Are Being Creatively Disrupted. Random House, New York, 2012. ISBN 978-0-307-59111-1.
- American Kingpin: The Epic Hunt for the Criminal Mastermind Behind the Silk Road. Penguin, New York, 2017. ISBN 978-1-59184-814-1.

Hatching Twitter told the story of Twitter's early days and its four founders—Evan Williams, Jack Dorsey, Noah Glass, and Biz Stone—who are portrayed as "mediocrities, narcissists and mopers who seem to spend as much time on scheming, self-promotion and self-destruction as on anything else", according to Tim Wu's review in the Washington Post. The book was optioned by Lionsgate in 2013, yet as of 2026 no series has been produced.

American Kingpin, published in May 2017, tells the story of the Silk Road marketplace, its founder Ross Ulbricht (who went by "Dread Pirate Roberts"), and how U.S. law enforcement arrested him. In June 2017, The Hollywood Reporter reported that the Coen brothers and Steven Zaillian were adapting the book into a movie.

== Filmography ==
Year	Title	director	Writer	Producer
2019	The Inventor: Out for Blood in Silicon Valley	Alex Gibney	No	Yes
2021	Fake Famous	Nick Bilton	Yes	Yes
2024	Biggest Heist Ever	-	No	Yes
TBA	Untitled Hawaii-Set Crime Drama	Martin Scorsese	Yes	Yes

== Personal life ==
Bilton and his wife Chrysta have two children. As of 2022, their home was in Los Angeles, having moved to L.A. in 2014 from San Francisco. Chrysta Bilton is the author of a book titled Normal Family: On Truth, Love, and How I Met My 35 Siblings.

Bilton is a member of NYC Resistor, a hackerspace in Brooklyn, New York.

== See also ==
- New Yorkers in journalism
