= Omar ibn Said =

Islamic scholar, enslaved in the United States

Omar Ibn Said
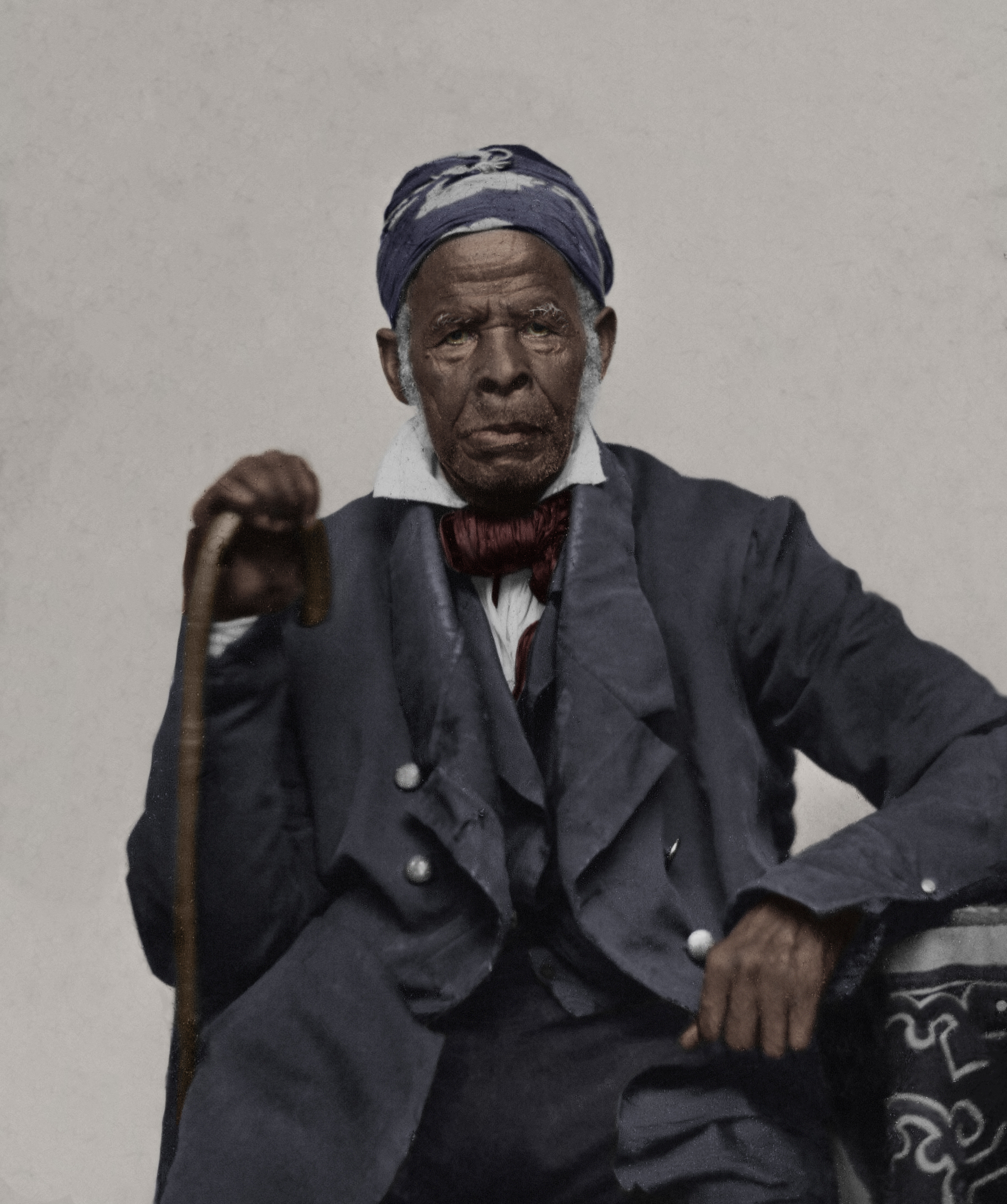
- Restored and colorized ambrotype of Omar ibn Said, c. 1850
- Born: Omar ibn Sayyid c. 1770; Futa Tooro, Empire of Great Fulo
- Died: 1864 (aged 93–94); Bladen County, North Carolina, Confederate States
- Other names: Uncle Moreau, Prince Omeroh
- Education: Formal Islamic education in Senegal
- Known for: Islamic scholar, author of slave narratives

Omar ibn Said, sometimes spelled Omar ibn Sa'id or Omar ibn Sayyid (Arabic: عُمَر بْن سَعِيد, romanized: ʿUmar bin Saʿīd or Omar ben Saeed; c. 1770–1864), was a Fula Muslim scholar from Futa Toro in West Africa (present-day Senegal), who was enslaved and transported to the United States in 1807 during the Trans-Atlantic slave trade. Remaining enslaved for the remainder of his life, he wrote a series of Arabic-language works on history and theology, including a short autobiography.

== Biography ==
Omar ibn Said was born around 1770 to a wealthy family in what would in a few years become the Imamate of Futa Toro, (Note: Said, Omar ibn (July 1925) [1831]. Jameson, John Franklin (ed.). "Autobiography of Omar ibn Sa'id, Slave in North Carolina, 1831". The American Historical Review. 30 (4): 787–795 – via University of North Carolina at Chapel Hill.) an Islamic theocratic state located along the Middle Senegal River in West Africa. (Note: Parramore, Thomas (1979). Powell, William S. (ed.). "Omar ibn Said, b. 1770?". Dictionary of North Carolina Biography. University of North Carolina Press.) He was an Islamic scholar of the Fula people, who spent 25 years of his life studying with prominent Muslim scholars, learning a range of subjects including mathematics, astronomy, business, and theology.

In 1807, he was captured during a military conflict, enslaved and taken across the Atlantic Ocean to the United States. He escaped from a cruel enslaver in Charleston, South Carolina, and journeyed to Fayetteville, North Carolina. There, he was recaptured, sent to jail, and later sold to James Owen, whom Omar ibn Said described as being gracious towards him. The Owen family was impressed by ibn Said's education and provided him with an English translation of the Quran. He also received an Arabic translation of the Bible with the help of Francis Scott Key, author of "The Star-Spangled Banner." (Note: McLaughlin, Eliott C. (2019-01-17). "Autobiography from 1831 provides rare, firsthand account of a Muslim slave in America". CNN. Archived from the original on 2021-09-15.) Ibn Said was offered multiple opportunities to return to Africa, but he chose to remain in the United States, citing his uncertainty that his family and his people were still intact. (Note: "Enslaved and Freed African Muslims: Spiritual Wayfarers in the South and Lowcountry". Lowcountry Digital History Initiative. Omar Ibn Said (ca. 1770–1864). Archived from the original on 2021-09-14 – via College of Charleston.) He lived into his mid-nineties and was still enslaved at the time of his death in 1864. He was buried in Bladen County, North Carolina. Omar ibn Said was also known as Uncle Moreau and Prince Omeroh.

Although it is said that ibn Said converted to Christianity in 1820, his conversion to Christianity is disputed, as there are dedications to Muhammad written in his Bible, and a card dated 1857 on which he wrote Surat An-Nasr, a short surah (chapter in the Quran) which refers to the conversion of non-Muslims to Islam "in multitudes." The back of this card contains another person's handwriting in English, misidentifying the surah as the Lord's Prayer and attesting to Omar's status as a good Christian. (Note: Horn, Patrick E. "Omar ibn Sa'id, African Muslim Enslaved in the Carolinas". University Library, University of North Carolina.) Additionally, while others writing on Omar's behalf identified him as a Christian, his autobiography and other writings offer more of an ambiguous position: in the autobiography, he still praises Muhammad when describing his life in his own country, and his references to "Jesus the Messiah" parallel Quranic descriptions of Jesus, who is called "the Messiah" (الْمَسِيح al-Masīḥ) a total of eleven times in the Quran. His characterization of Jesus as "our master" (سَيِّدُنَا sayyidunā) similarly employs the typical Islamic honorific for prophets as distinct from "Lord" (رَبّ rabb), and his notion of Jesus "bringing grace and truth" (a reference to John 1:14) is equally appropriate to the conception of Jesus in Islam.

Literary analysis of ibn Said's autobiography suggests that he wrote it for two audiences: the white literates who sought to exploit his conversion to Christianity and Muslim readers who would recognize Qur'anic literary devices and subtext and understand his position as a fellow Muslim using Taqiya to hide his faith while living under persecution. In a letter written to Sheikh Hunter regarding the autobiography, he apologized for forgetting the "talk" of his homeland. He ended the letter saying: "O my brothers, do not blame me," knowing that Hunter would require Arabic-speaking translators to read the message. Scholar Basima Kamel Shaheen argues that Said's spiritual ambiguity may have been purposefully cultivated to impress upon a wide readership the injustices of slavery.

== Manuscripts ==
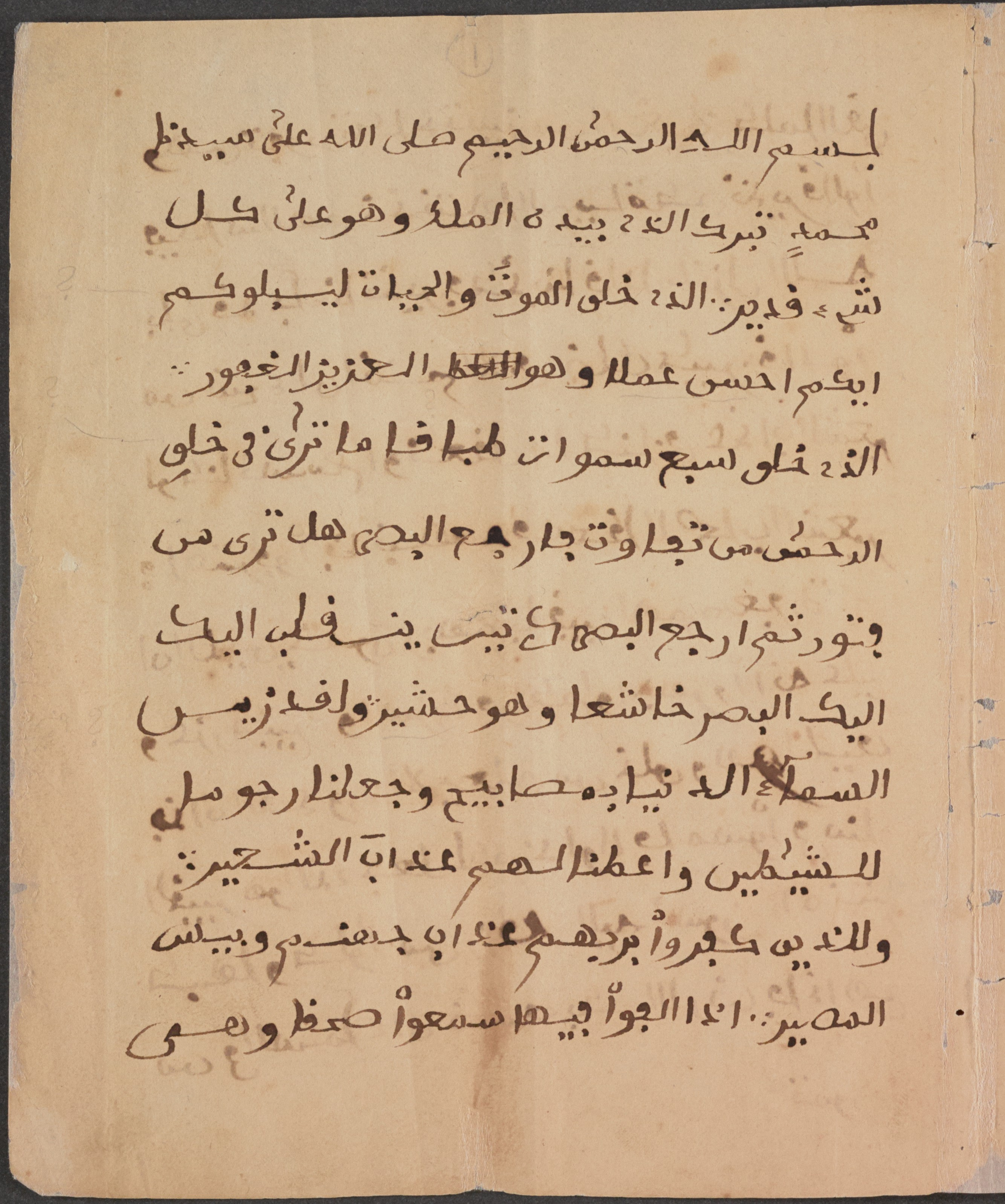
Surat Al-Mulk from the Qur'an, copied by Omar ibn Said in a rudimentary Fulani script

Omar ibn Said authored fourteen manuscripts in Arabic. The best known of these is his autobiographical essay, The life of Omar ben Saeed, called Morro, a Fullah Slave in Fayetteville, N.C. Owned by Governor Owen, written in 1831. It describes some of the events of his life and includes reflections on his steadfast adherence to Islam and his openness towards other "God-fearing" people. On the surface, the document may appear to be tolerant towards slavery; however, Said begins it with Surat Al-Mulk, a chapter from the Qur'an, which states that only God has sovereignty over human beings. (Note: Quran 67:1 ^{(Translated by Pickthall)}. "Blessed is He in Whose hand is the Sovereignty, and He is Able to do all things.") The manuscript is the only known Arabic autobiography by a person enslaved in the United States. It was sold as part of a collection of Said's documents between private collectors and later acquired by the Library of Congress in 2017. It has since been treated for preservation and made available for viewing online. (Note: "Only Known Surviving Muslim American Slave Autobiography Goes Online at the Library of Congress". Library of Congress. Archived from the original on 2019-01-19.)

Most of Said's other work consisted of Islamic manuscripts in Arabic, including a handwritten copy of some short chapters (surat) from the Qur'an that are now part of the North Carolina Collection in the Wilson Library at University of North Carolina at Chapel Hill. His Bible, a translation into Arabic published by a missionary society, which has notations in Arabic by Said, is part of the rare books collection at Davidson College. (Note: "Search Results for: Omar Ibn Sayyid". Davidson College Archives & Special Collections.) Said also authored a letter in Arabic dated 1819 addressed to James Owen's brother, Major John Owen. It contains numerous Quranic references (including from the above-mentioned Surat Al-Mulk), as well as several geometric symbols and shapes, which suggest its possible esoteric intentions. This letter is currently held at Andover Theological Seminary.

== Legacy ==
In 1991, a mosque in Fayetteville, North Carolina renamed itself Masjid Omar ibn Sayyid in his honor.

The opera Omar, inspired by ibn Said and written by Rhiannon Giddens and Michael Abels, had its debut at the Sottile Theater during the Spoleto Festival USA in Charleston, South Carolina on May 27, 2022. (Note: Cooper, Michael (2019-06-10). "Rhiannon Giddens Is Writing an Opera". The New York Times.) Omar won the Pulitzer Prize for Music on May 8, 2023.

Ghais Guevara's 2025 album Goyard Ibn Said and Guevara's alias Goyard Ibn Said are inspired by ibn Said.

== Gallery ==
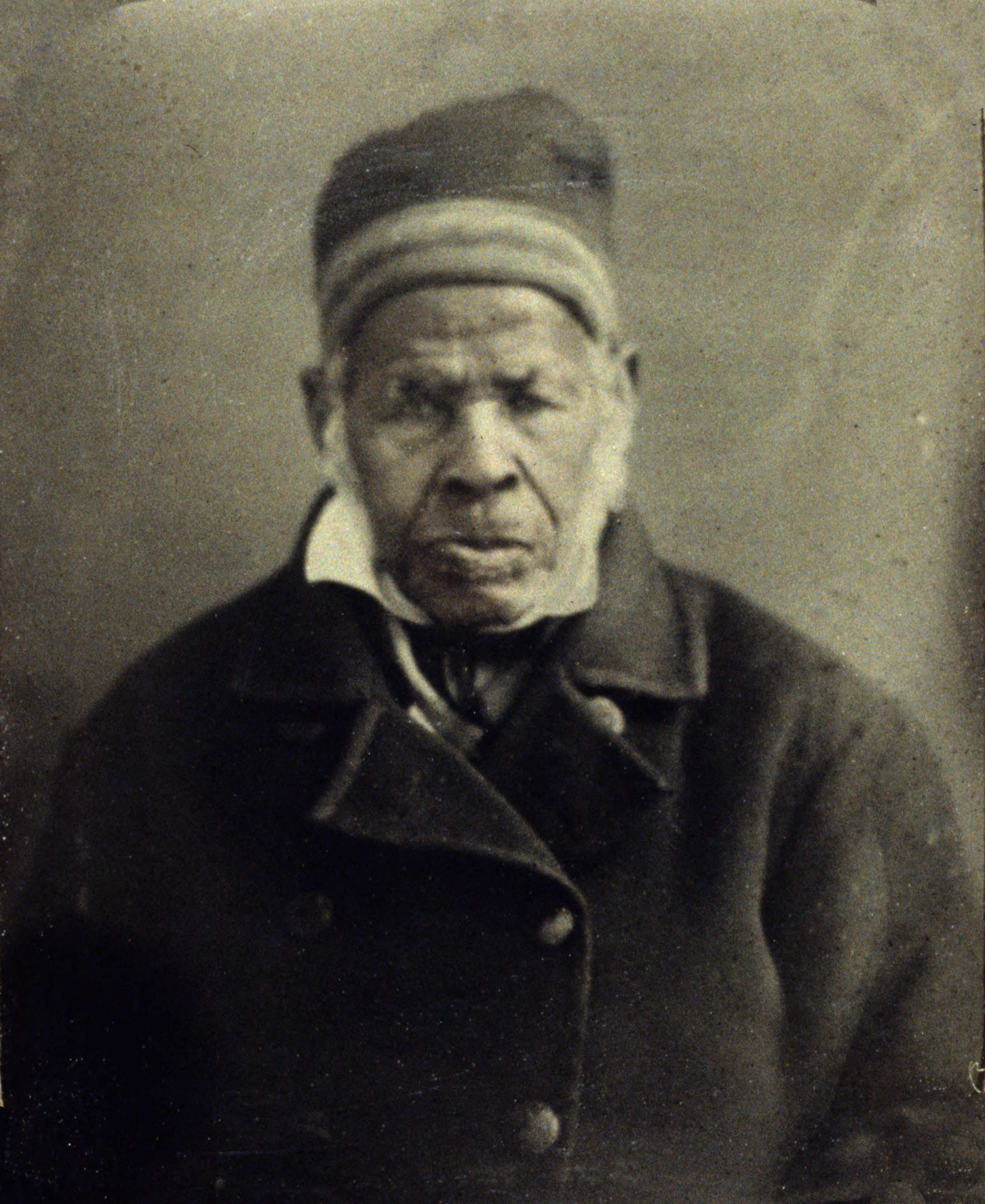
Ambrotype portrait, c. 1855

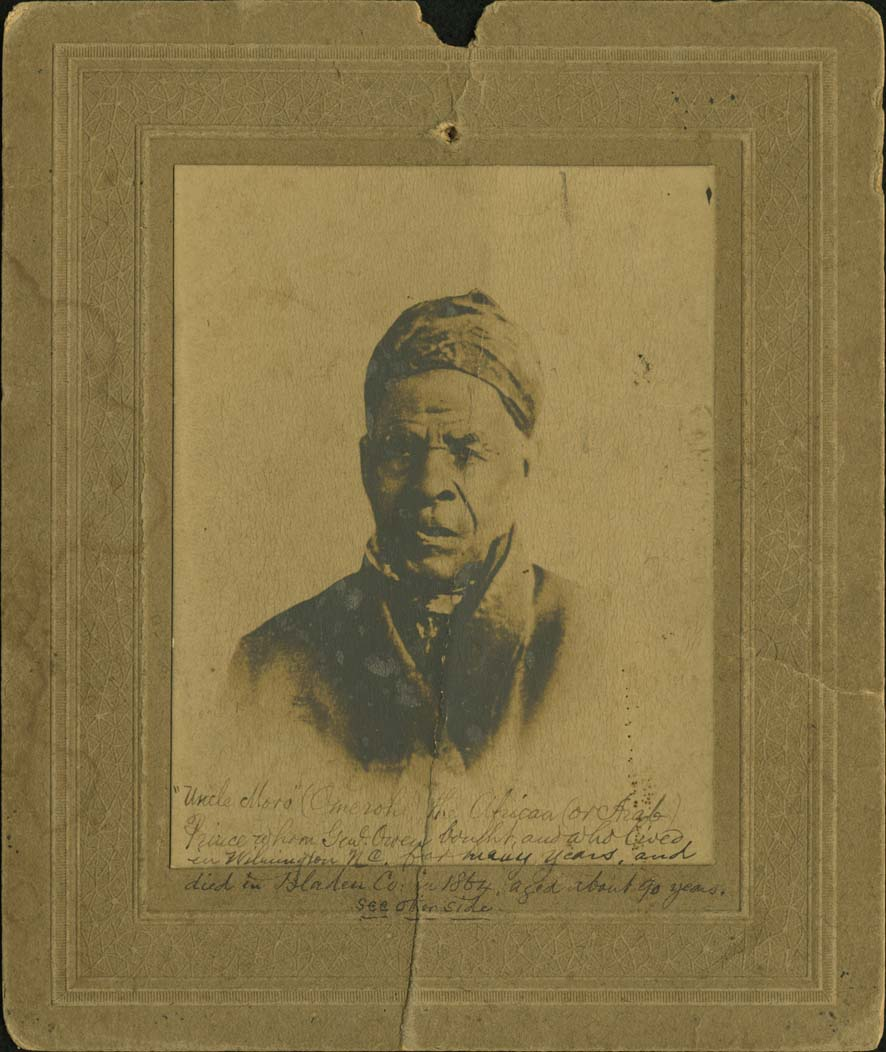
Photographic portrait, c. 1905

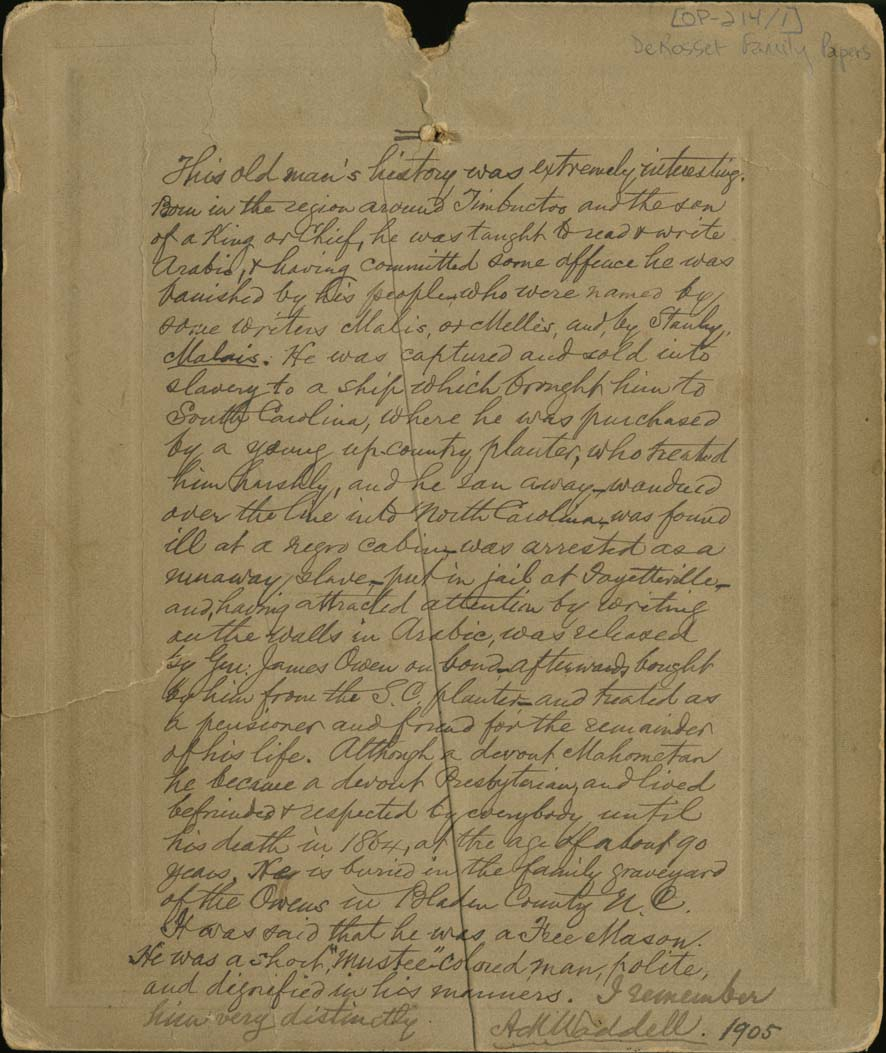
Reverse of c. 1905 portrait

== See also ==
- Islam in the United States
- List of slaves
- Trans-Saharan slave trade
