= Jessie Baetz =

American composer and artist (1894–1980)

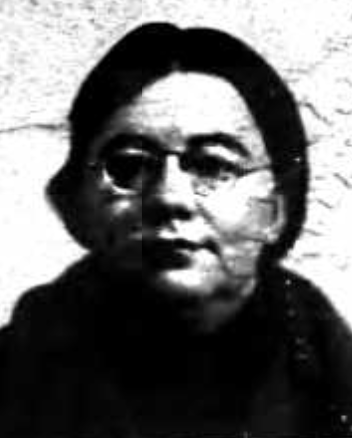
- Jessie Baetz, from a 1936 immigration form
- Born: Jessie Elizabeth Drummer; June 28, 1894; Toronto, Ontario, Canada
- Died: November 28, 1980 (aged 86); New Paltz, New York
- Occupations: Artist, composer, and pianist
- Spouse: Walter Baetz (m. 1926; died 1978)

Jessie Baetz (born Jessie Elizabeth Drummer; June 28, 1894 – November 28, 1980) was a Canadian-American artist, composer, and pianist.

== Early life and education ==
Baetz was born in Toronto, Ontario, Canada, the daughter of John Drummer and Esther Ann Oughtred Drummer. She studied and taught at the Toronto Conservatory of Music.

== Career ==
She immigrated to New York City, where 1930s census records list her occupation as painter. Her art was included in a Christmas exhibit at the Jumble Shop on West 8th Street. She studied with modernist composer, Johanna Beyer, and played in her concerts for the New York Composers' Forum. Baetz's music was influenced by Beyer and Henry Cowell's use of such techniques as tone clusters, polymeters, string piano, and playing the piano with forearms. Three of her works were performed at the Composers' Forum on December 15, 1937, where they were part of a program that also included music by Rudolph Forst and Harrison Kerr.

Her visual art consisted of "painting sculptures or spatial creations", including colorful masks. She exhibited her work at the Phoenicia Library in Phoenicia, New York in 1963, 1966, and 1970.

== Works ==
Baetz's only known compositions are the Two Compositions for Violin and Piano, Three Vocalizes for Soprano, and Six Dances for Percussion. They were never published and the whereabouts of these or any of her other musical works are unknown.

In 1936, she was one of the performers in recordings made for the New Music Quarterly of Bill Russell's Three Dance Movements: For Percussion Group and Wallingford Riegger's Evocation.

== Personal life ==
Jessie Drummer married fellow artist Walter Baetz in 1926. They lived in Shandaken, New York. In 1961 they were both rescued after a carbon monoxide accident in their home. Her husband died in 1978, and she died in November 1980, at a nursing home in New Paltz, New York, at the age of 86.
