= Michael Abels =

American classical/film composer

- Abels in 2026
- Born: October 8, 1962 (age 64); Phoenix, Arizona, U.S.
- Education: USC Los Angeles Thornton School Of Music
- Occupation: Composer

Michael Abels (born October 8, 1962) is an American composer best known for the opera Omar, co-written with Rhiannon Giddens, and his scores for the Jordan Peele films Get Out, Us and Nope. The hip-hop influenced score for Us was short-listed for the Oscars and was even named "Score of the Decade" by TheWrap. Other recent media projects include the films Bad Education, Nightbooks, Fake Famous, and the docu-series Allen v. Farrow. His most recent releases include Beauty which premiered at the Tribeca Film Festival and is now streaming on Netflix, Breaking (formerly 892) which premiered at Sundance, and his third collaboration with Jordan Peele, Nope.

Abels' works also includes many concert works, such as At War With Ourselves for the Kronos Quartet, Isolation Variation for Hilary Hahn, and the opera Omar co-composed with Grammy-winning singer/songwriter Rhiannon Giddens. Some of these pieces are available on the Cedille Records, including Delights & Dances and Winged Creatures. Recent commissions include a work for the National Symphony Orchestra and a guitar concerto for Mak Grgić.

Abels is co-founder of the Composers Diversity Collective, an advocacy group to increase visibility of composers of color in film, gaming and streaming media.

In 2023, the opera Omar, co-written by Abels and Rhiannon Giddens, won the Pulitzer Prize for Music.

== Early life ==
Abels was born in Phoenix, Arizona. He spent his early years on a small farm in South Dakota, where he lived with his grandparents. Introduced to music via the family piano, he began showing an innate curiosity towards music at age 4. His music-loving grandparents convinced the local piano teacher to take him on as a student despite his age. At age 8, Abels began composing music, and by age 13, his first completed orchestral work was performed.

Upon graduating from high school, Abels attended the University of Southern California Thornton School of Music in Los Angeles. Abels, who is mixed race, eventually studied West African drumming techniques at California Institute of the Arts, and sang in a predominantly black church choir to further explore his African-American roots.

== Filmography ==
Composer

- Get Out (2017)
- Us (2019)
- See You Yesterday (2019)
- All Day and a Night (2020)
- Bad Education (2020)
- Fake Famous (2021)
- Nightbooks (2021)
- Allen v. Farrow (2021)
- Nope (2022)
- Breaking (2022)
- Landscape with Invisible Hand (2023)
- The Burial (2023)
- The American Society of Magical Negroes (2024)
- The Acolyte (2024)
- Sirens (2025)
- The 'Burbs (2026)
- Hope (2026)
- Behemoth! (2026)

Additional music

- Detroit (2017)

=== Other works ===
- Global Warming (1990) (commissioned by the Phoenix Youth Symphony)
- I'm Determined (1991) for orchestra
- How Majestic (1992) for orchestra
- American Variations on Swing Low Sweet Chariot (1993) (premiered by Doc Severinsen and the Phoenix Symphony)
- Frederick's Fables (1994, 1996) four pieces for orchestra, based on selected stories of Leo Lionni
- Dance for Martin's Dream (1998) for orchestra (commissioned by the Houston Symphony and the Nashville Symphony)
- You're a Grand Old Flag (1995) for orchestra
- More Seasons (1999)
- Limitless (2000) for choir, or soloist with choral accompaniment, and piano
- Homies & Popz (2001) opera
- Tribute (2001) for orchestra
- Affectionate Objects (2004) for orchestra
- Outburst (2005) for orchestra
- Delights & Dances (2007) for string quartet and orchestra
- Urban Legends (2008) for string quartet and orchestra (commissioned by the Sphinx Organization)
- Aquadia (2009) for orchestra (co-commissioned by the Chicago Sinfonietta and the Shedd Aquarium)
- Be the Change (2015) for choir, or soloist with choral accompaniment, and piano
- The Open Hand
- Victory Road (2017) for orchestra
- Iconoclasm (2017) for piano
- Liquify (2017) for orchestra
- Twilight Drive for piano
- Winged Creatures (2018) for flute, clarinet and orchestra (commissioned by Cedille Records) written for Anthony and Demarre McGill
- Pensivity for piano
- Life in a Day
- Struck by Enlightenment
- Falling Sky (for concert band) (2019)
- Falling Sky, ballet (2020)
- Anguish (from Falling Sky) (2020) for piano
- Gift of the Machine (2020)
- Isolation Variation (2020) for unaccompanied violin (for Hillary Hahn)
- At War with Ourselves, oratorio - libretto by Nikky Finney, commissioned for the Kronos Quartet
- Omar, an original opera on the life of Omar ibn Said co-composed by Rhiannon Giddens
- Get Out, in concert (2020)
- Emerge (2021) for orchestra (co-commission from Detroit Symphony Orchestra)
- Guitar Concerto "Borders" (2022) Commissioned by ROCO & Quad City Symphony, written for Mak Grgić

== Awards and nominations ==
Year	Award	Category	Nominated work	Result
2017	Fright Meter Awards	Best Score	Get Out	Nominated
2017	World Soundtrack Awards	Discovery of the Year	Get Out	Nominated
2017	International Online Cinema Awards	Best Original Score	Get Out	Won
2018	International Film Music Critics Awards	Best Original Score for a Fantasy/Science Fiction/Horror Film	Get Out	Nominated
2018	Black Reel Awards	Outstanding Score	Get Out	Won
2019	Washington DC Area Film Critics Association Award	Best Original Score	Us	Won
2019	World Soundtrack Awards	Discovery of the Year	Us	Won
2019	Indiana Film Journalists Association	Best Musical Score	Us	Won
2019	Greater Western New York Film Critics Association Awards	Best Score	Us	Nominated
2019	Chicago Film Critics Association Award	Best Original Score	Us	Nominated
2019	Phoenix Critics Circle	Best Score	Us	Nominated
2019	Seattle Film Critics Society Awards	Best Original Score	Us	Nominated
2019	Hollywood Music in Media Awards	Best Original Score- Horror Film	Us	Won
2019	Fright Meter Awards	Best Score	Us	Won
2020	Academy Awards	Best Original Score	Us	Shortlisted
2020	51st NAACP Image Award	Outstanding Soundtrack/Compilation Album	Us	Nominated
2020	Critics Choice Awards	Best Score	Us	Nominated
2020	Black Reel Award	Outstanding Score	Us	Won
2020	Latino Entertainment Journalists Association Film Award	Best Music	Us	Nominated
2020	Music City Film Critics' Association Award	Best Score	Us	Nominated
2020	North Carolina Film Critics Association	Best Music	Us	Nominated
2020	Online Film & Television Association, OFTA Film Award	Best Music, Original Score	Us	Nominated
2020	Society of Composers and Lyricists Awards	Outstanding Original Score for a Studio Film	Us	Nominated
2020	Austin Film Critics Association Awards	Best Score	Us	Nominated
2020	International Film Music Critics Award	Best Original Score for a Fantasy/Science Fiction/Horror Film	Us	Nominated
2020	Central Ohio Film Critics Association	Best Score	Us	Won
2020	Chicago Independent Film Critics Circle Award	Best Original Score	Us	Won
2020	Georgia Film Critics Association	Original Score	Us	Nominated
2020	Gold Derby Awards	Original Score	Us	Nominated
2020	Hawaii Film Critics Society	Best Original Score	Us	Nominated
2020	Hollywood Critics Association	Best Score	Us	Nominated
2020	Houston Film Critics Society Awards	Best Original Score	Us	Nominated
2020	Online Film Critics Society Awards	Best Original Score	Us	Won
2021	73rd Primetime Creative Arts Emmy Awards	Outstanding Original Score for a Documentary Series or Special (Original Dramatic Score)	Allen v. Farrow	Nominated
2021	73rd Primetime Creative Arts Emmy Awards	Outstanding Original Main Title Theme Music	Allen v. Farrow	Nominated
2023	Academy Awards	Best Original Score	Nope	Shortlisted
2023	Pulitzer Prize	Music	Omar	Won
2025	56th NAACP Image Awards	Outstanding Original Score for Television/Motion Picture	The Acolyte	Won
2025	56th NAACP Image Awards	Outstanding Original Score for Television/Motion Picture	The American Society of Magical Negroes	Nominated
2026	78th Primetime Creative Arts Emmy Awards	Outstanding Original Main Title Theme Music	The 'Burbs	Nominated
