= Yonekura Shigetsugu =

Japanese samurai

Battle of Nagashino
- Part of the Sengoku period
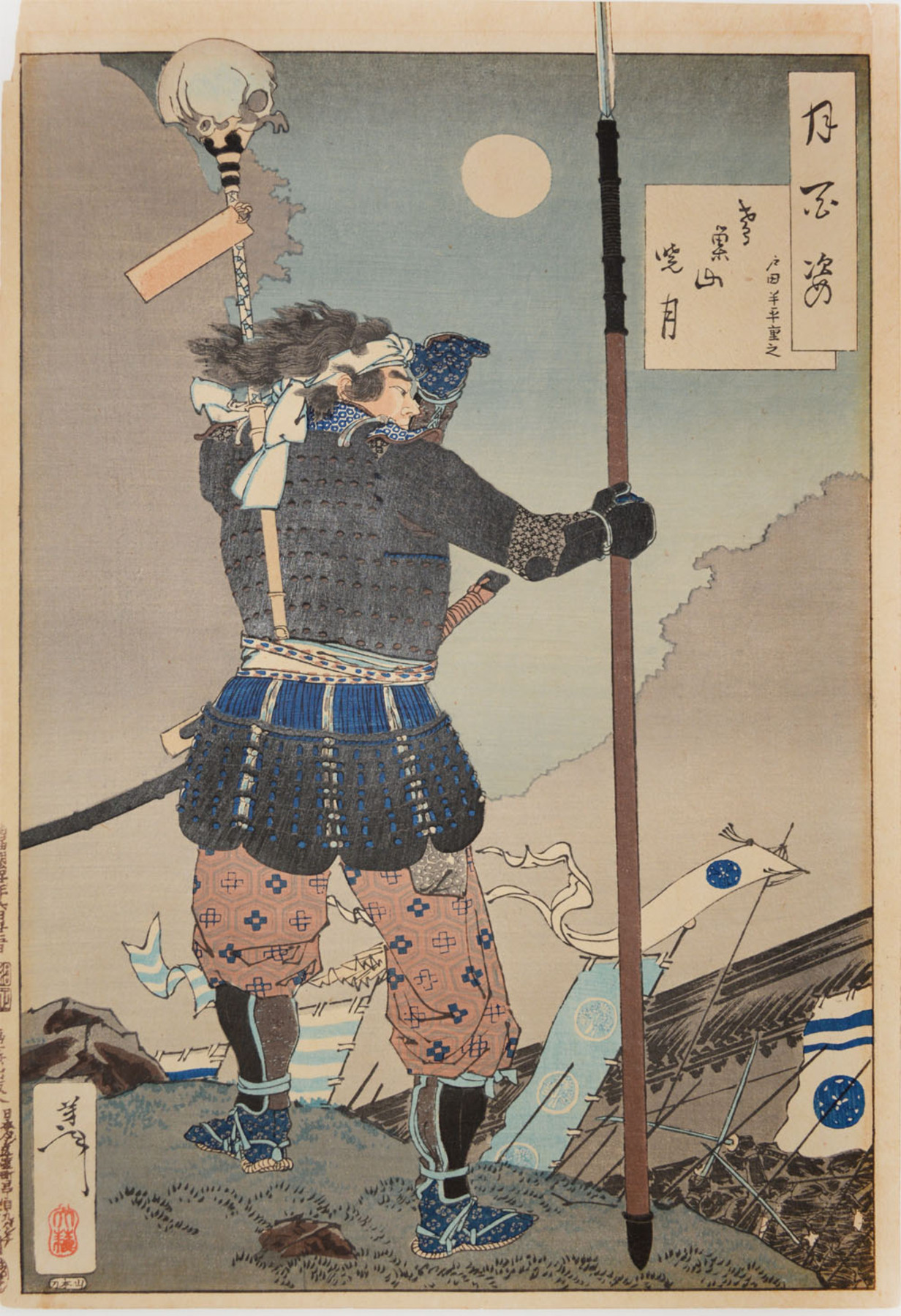
- General launching his troops to attack the castle of Nagashino in 1575, by Yoshitoshi
Date	June 28, 1575
Location	Nagashino, Mikawa Province, Japan
Result	Siege fails; Oda-Tokugawa victory

Belligerents
Takeda forces	combined Oda-Tokugawa forces

Commanders and leaders
Takeda Katsuyori, Anayama Nobukimi, Takeda Nobukado	Oda Nobunaga, Tokugawa Ieyasu, Okudaira Sadamasa

Yonekura Shigetsugu (died 1575) was a famous Japanese samurai and a member of the Takeda clan.

== Biography ==
Shigetsugu was a retainer of Takeda Shingen and servant of Amari Haruyoshi. He was killed during the Battle of Nagashino and is remembered for his participation in both the Battle of Kawanakajima (1564) and the Battle of Nagashino in 1575.

During the Battle of Nagashino in 1575, both the Tokugawa clan and Oda Nobunaga sent troops to alleviate the siege, and Takeda Katsuyori was defeated. The victory of Oda's Western-style tactics and firearms over Takeda's cavalry charge is often cited as a turning point in Japanese warfare; many cite it as the first "modern" Japanese battle. Yonekura Shigetsugu rushed the Takeda flank singlehandedly before he was killed by gunfire. His corpse was later impaled on a pike by Nobunaga's forces. (see Battles of Kawanakajima)

Following the battle, Nobunaga continued henceforth until he had effectively established control over all of Japan. Yonekura's death poem is often performed in Noh plays to this day, and is a prime example of the Haiku form in death poems. While death poems did not adopt any prescribed form as far as syllables, tone, and length were concerned (the ritual required flexibility, compared to most samurai rituals, like the tea ceremony, which were practiced with rigidity), it was usually required to be short, be pertinent, and invoke pathos in the listener. It did not need to rhyme and considering the fact that most Japanese singing was expected to be discordant and erratic, this is not surprising. The flexibility of the death poem was in direct contrast with the rigid caste system that pervaded Japanese life during that period of time.

Shigetsugu was part of the crucial Nagashino cavalry counter. As far as typical military strategy is concerned, whether or not a cavalry charge is successful depends on the enemy infantry breaking ranks in order for the cavalry to mow them down. However, when the enemies' infantry does not break rank and scatter, the cavalry charge will often fail, since trained warhorses refuse to advance into solid masses of soldiers. By opposing their adversaries' traditional tactics in this way, Takeda Katsuyori's forces hoped to rout the cavalry charges. They failed.

His master, the late Amari Haruyoshi (also known as Amari Masatada), was a famous Takeda samurai. Believed to have been born in 1533, Masatada was the eldest son of Amari Torayasu and a servant of Takeda Shingen. He fought at Kikyôgahara (1549), where the Ogasawara incurred a severe reversal at the Takeda's hands. He also served at the battles of 4th Kawanakajima (1561), Usuigatoge, and Matsuyama (1563). He was killed in a riding accident in 1564; As he was riding, he sustained an injury and was unhorsed. As he lay on the ground, he attempted to stem the flow of blood that came forth from the wound. While he was distracted, he failed to notice his horse until it was right on top of him, trampling him. He is probably most widely known for an incident involving one of his wounded retainers. When the man's bleeding did not abate, Masatada advised him to drink horse feces mixed with water to help accelerate the formation of blood clots (a folk remedy). When the wounded man hesitated to consume raw horse dung, Masatada himself consumed some of the concoction. Encouraged, his retainer drank from the same cup and was reported to have recovered.

== Descendants ==
Muramatsu, Shigetsugu, co-inventor of semiconductor United States Patent 7180182 is descended from Yonekura Shigetsuga. The Shigetsuga line also includes famed sword maker, Kasama Ikkansai Shigetsugu.

Map of Japanese provinces with Shigetsugu's home province highlighted

== Attributed Quote (No play) ==
like a dew I was born
like a dew I die
all life is but an illusion

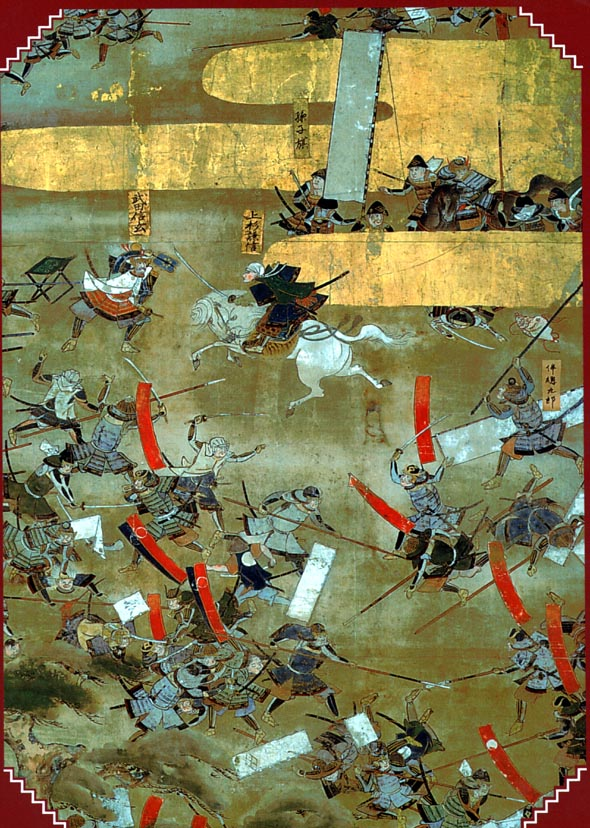
Battle of Kawanakajima in 1561
