= Boo Hanks =

American blues guitarist (1928–2016)

- Born: James Arthur Hanks; April 30, 1928; Vance County, North Carolina, United States
- Died: April 15, 2016 (aged 87) Durham, North Carolina, United States
- Genres: Piedmont blues
- Occupation(s): Guitarist, singer
- Instrument(s): Guitar, vocals
- Years active: 1940s–2016
- Labels: Music Maker

James Arthur "Boo" Hanks (April 30, 1928 – April 15, 2016) was an American Piedmont blues guitarist and singer. He was billed as the last of the Piedmont blues musicians.

Hanks recorded two albums in his lifetime, Pickin' Low Cotton (2007) and Buffalo Junction (2012), both released by the Music Maker record label. A one-time farmer, who grew up in and lived most of his adult life around Buffalo Junction, Virginia, Hanks appeared at the Roots of American Music Festival at the Lincoln Center, shared a bill with Patti Smith, was covered by The New York Times, and performed at the New Orleans Jazz & Heritage Festival; plus he toured in both the US and Europe.

== Life and career ==
Hanks was born in Vance County, North Carolina, United States, to the late Eddie and Fannie Hargrove Hanks. His heritage came from ancestors that variously were African American and Occaneechi. Family folklore reckons the family are descendants of Abraham Lincoln's mother, Nancy Hanks. Hanks attended Henderson Institute in Henderson, North Carolina. He bought his first guitar from the money he raised selling packets of garden seeds. With it, he learned to pick out the same songs his father played in the evening, after working as a share-cropper in the tobacco fields. In addition to tuition from his father, Hanks inspiration came initially from listening to his family's wind-up Victrola record player, in particular the recordings of Blind Boy Fuller. Hanks learned to play, and tune his guitar, purely by ear, and picked up a delicate finger-style method of guitar picking. Hanks later stated "Most people, when they hear me play, they think it's two guitars, because I play the bass and the other strings at the same time. They say, man that's two guitars, and I say no, me, it's just me by myself. They say, don't believe you, it sounds like two guitars to me."

His Piedmont string band ambitions were restricted to him playing locally. In the 1940s, Hanks played his guitar at barn dances, along with his cousins providing accompaniment on mandolin and spoons. However, Hanks never played outside his locale until he was aged 79, and worked in the tobacco fields up to that time. Hanks was a farmer for over two decades, but was also employed by Russell Stover Candies, Lenox, and later at the TOP Tobacco Factory in Oxford, North Carolina.

In 2007, Hanks made his first recording, Pickin' Low Cotton, at age 79. It was issued by Music Maker, who provides regular support to various low-income blues and roots musicians. In addition to assisting Hanks himself at that time, these veteran musicians then included Ironing Board Sam who was fitted with new prescription glasses; John Dee Holeman who needed assistance to pay for his medication; and the R&B singer Denise LaSalle who was given help to pay her mortgage. In 2008, Hanks appeared in a documentary film, Toots Blues. Also in the film were Adolphus Bell, Cool John Ferguson, Guitar Gabriel, George Higgs, Macavine Hayes, John Dee Holeman, Drink Small, Cootie Stark, Beverly Watkins and Albert White. In the same year, and just after his 80th birthday, Hanks appeared at the Mississippi Valley Blues Festival, in Davenport, Iowa. In August of that year, Hanks performed at the 25th Annual Roots of American Music Festival, held at the Lincoln Center in New York.

In 2010, the Music Maker Relief Foundation helped Hanks obtain a passport, purchased a new trailer for him and provided an allowance towards his medication and food. Dom Flemons had been at the Music Maker office the day Hanks arrived, and their growing friendship led to a collaborative recording of the album, Buffalo Junction (2012), named for Hanks' hometown. It contained upbeat country blues with Hanks playing his guitar and providing the main vocals, while Flemons played jug, harmonica, bones and supplied the backing vocals. The album comprised twelve tracks, which the two musicians recorded in Hanks' trailer home. These included the traditional folk number "Railroad Bill", plus a version of Sticks McGhee's "Drinking Wine, Spodie Odie" Another track was a version of Blind Lemon Jefferson's song, "One Dime Blues", which in the lyrics had the line "Mama, don't treat your daughter mean." One of the collection's songs was their collaboration on "Diddy Wah Diddy", penned by Willie Dixon and Bo Diddley. Hanks and Flemons take on Blind Boy Fuller's song "Truckin' My Blues Away" was another number on the album. Hanks and Flemons toured in the US and Europe, primarily in Belgium, to support the album.

By December 2014, Hanks still played on occasion at local bars and nursing homes. In July 2015, Hanks was on the same bill as Lightnin' Wells and Ironing Board Sam at a concert in the Sarah P. Duke Gardens, Duke University, Durham, North Carolina. He also performed at The Prizery in South Boston, Virginia, and the Clarksville Fine Arts Center.

Hanks died on April 15, 2016, at the Select Specialty Hospital, in Durham, North Carolina. He was 87. He was survived by five daughters; one son and one daughter predeceased him.

== Discography ==
Year	Title	Collaboration	Record label
2007	Pickin' Low Cotton		Music Maker
2012	Buffalo Junction	with Dom Flemons	Music Maker

== See also ==
- List of Piedmont blues musicians
