= Atlanta blues =

Music genre or scene

- Stylistic origins: Blues, country blues
- Cultural origins: Early 20th century, Atlanta, Georgia, United States
- Typical instruments: Guitar, drums, piano, harmonica, vocals

Atlanta blues refers to the local blues scene in Atlanta, Georgia, United States, which had its heyday in the 1920s and 1930s. According to AllMusic, "The Atlanta blues scene of the 1920s was among the most fertile in all the South, with a steady stream of rural musicians converging on the city hoping to gain exposure playing the local club circuit, with any luck rising to perform at Decatur Street's famed 81 Theatre".

The oldest representative of the Atlanta blues was Peg Leg Howell, who made his first recordings in 1926. He was followed by Blind Willie McTell, Barbecue Bob, Charley Lincoln, and Curley Weaver, with McTell typically being the most popular and acclaimed. Many of these musicians banded together into groups; the most popular of these bands were the Georgia Cotton Pickers.

Cora Mae Bryant, the daughter of Curley Weaver, gradually became important on the Atlanta blues scene; performing, organizing "Giving It Back" festivals at the city's Northside Tavern to honor early blues artists, and as a frequent caller to local blues radio shows. Also, Bryant's knowledge of early blues in Atlanta and Georgia was used as a source by the music historians Peter B. Lowry and Bruce Bastin.

More modern blues performers who have come out of or near Atlanta include Sean Costello, Baby Tate, Precious Bryant, Beverly Watkins, Albert White, Eddie Tigner, Robert Cray, Jesse Fuller, Jontavious Willis, Neal Pattman, Guitar Gabriel, Frank Edwards, Ray Charles, James Wheeler, Golden Big Wheeler, Larry Johnson, Otis Redding, Joe Carter, Luther "Georgia Boy" Johnson, Luther "Houserocker" Johnson, Little Richard, James Brown, Billy Wright, and Chick Willis.

A documentary film, Northside Tavern: The Mostly True Story of the Golden Age of Atlanta's Most Exquisite Blues Dive, was released on December 22, 2022.
