= Ardie Dean =

- Born: Ardie Dean Strutzenberg; January 29, 1955 (age 70); Humboldt, Iowa, United States
- Genres: Electric blues
- Occupation(s): Drummer, audio engineer, record producer
- Instrument: Drums
- Years active: 1969–present
- Labels: Music Maker, various

Ardie Dean (born January 29, 1955) is an American electric blues drummer, audio engineer and record producer. In a varied career over fifty years, Dean has worked with the Giddens Sisters, Alabama Slim, Homesick James, Little Freddie King, Lee Gates, Ernie K-Doe, Bo Diddley, Gregg Allman, Sweet Betty, Guitar Gabriel, Adolphus Bell, Jerry McCain, Macavine Hayes, Beverly Watkins, Lightnin' Wells, Taj Mahal, Cootie Stark, Sam Frazier Jr., Ironing Board Sam, Captain Luke, Cool John Ferguson, and Robert Lee Coleman, among others.

Involved in the music industry since 1969, Dean has been the musical director, and record producer for the Music Maker Relief Foundation since 1994. He plays a 1930s Ludwig drum kit.

Dean has been inducted into the Kansas Music Hall of Fame, the Alabama Blues Hall of Fame (2017) and the Iowa Blues Hall of Fame (2018).

== Life and musical career ==
Ardie Dean Strutzenberg was born and raised in Humboldt, Iowa, United States. At the age of 11, Dean purchased his first drum kit for $15 from a Fort Dodge pawn shop; the money came from mowing lawns. He had previously become interested in percussion by listening to his mother playing boogie-woogie piano. One night when Dean was 12 years old, a family friend inquired if Dean and his guitar playing friend, Ed Lindsey, could play him a song. Once the duo had finished playing, the man gave them each $2, jokingly adding "Now you’re professionals". From that humble beginning, Dean and Lindsey joined with John Callahan and Mark Flanagan to form their first band named Blue Condition. Dean then played throughout high school with Callahan, Flanagan, Jon Porter and Randy Berka, billed as the Lazy River Band, and then later teaming with Callahan, Flanagan and John Brandsgard as Goo. With booking agents interested, the teenagers employed their parents to transport them around Iowa to perform. Dean noted "We were making really good money, more than some of my high school teachers were making, and that’s when I decided I wanted to play drums professionally." Dean left Humboldt and played rock, rhythm and blues and then country, before sitting in a jam session with a blues musician, Chicago Charlie. This led Dean to a meeting with Homesick James, and Dean became his drummer for a decade while Homesick was living in Nashville.

Following this experience Dean traveled the Chitlin' Circuit, leading a band for the R&B singer Chuck Strong. Work alongside Guitar Gabriel followed, which indirectly led to the formation in 1994 of the Music Maker Relief Foundation. Dean played at Carnegie Hall, alongside Guitar Gabriel and Tim Duffy in the original "Brothers in the Kitchen." In 1999, Dean met and began playing drums for Taj Mahal, an association that has lasted the years. This all led to regular session musician work in Nashville.

His musical journey expended in to record production and Dean has mastered albums for Big Ron Hunter, Jerry McCain, Sweet Betty, Alabama Slim, and Little Freddie King among others.

The Music Maker Blues Revue is an all-star outfit originally created to back Guitar Gabriel, but has outlived that association to create an on-stage presence at Music Maker's various concerts. Etta Baker, Macavine Hayes, Robert Lee Coleman, and Pat "Mother Blues" Cohen have all benefited from having the Revue as their backing band. Dean regularly supplies the percussion work for this group. Albert White (guitar), Nashid Abdul (bass), and Lil' Joe Burton (trombone) form the other semi-permanent members of the ensemble. They first appeared at the 1994 Jazz Charlotte Festival. In 1998 and 1999, the Revue was joined by Taj Mahal for his Winston Blues Revival tour. In 2016, the Revue performed at the Globalfest in New York City.

Dean has also played at the Limestone Correctional Facility, near his home outside of Huntsville, Alabama. Other work took place with Ernie K-Doe, Bo Diddley, Jerry McCain, Gregg Allman, Taj Mahal, and Henry Grey. Dean is one of a few drummers that Bo Diddley allowed to play the Bo Diddley beat with him. Dean also collects and sells classic drum kits.

Dean played the drums and acted a musical director for Music Maker artists who performed at the 2015 Byron Bay Bluesfest.

In 2018, upon hearing about his forthcoming Iowa Blues Hall of Fame induction and that he was required to perform at the ceremony, Dean assembled his former high school bandmates — Berka, Porter and Brandsgard.

== Partial selected discography ==
Dean estimates that he has played on over 100 blues albums.

Year	Title	Artist	Credited as
1999	Back in Business	Beverly Watkins	Drums
1999	Sugar Man	Cootie Stark	Drums
2004	Music Makers With Taj Mahal	Taj Mahal	Drums
2005	Boogie Is My Name	Jerry McCain	Producer, Audio Production, Drums
2005	Drinkhouse	Macavine Hayes	Drums
2005	Feelings of Beverly "Guitar" Watkins	Beverly Watkins	Producer, Drums, Percussion
2005	Ragged But Right	Lightnin' Wells	Drums
2005	Mississippi Rubberleg	Adolphus Bell	Producer
2006	Black Lucy's Deuce	Lee Gates	Producer, Mixing, Audio Production, Drums, Mastering
2006	Live and Let Live	Sweet Betty	Producer, Drums, Tambourine
2006	One Man Band	Adolphus Bell	Producer
2006	Touring With Lucy	Lee Gates	Producer, Drums
2007	The Mighty Flood	Alabama Slim and Little Freddie King	Drums, Producer
2008	One of These Days	Captain Luke	Producer, Drums, Engineer, Tambourine
2008	Live at the Hamilton	Captain Luke and Cool John Ferguson	Drums, Mastering
2008	Christmas With Cootie	Cootie Stark	Drums
2009	One More Mile	Robert Lee Coleman	Producer, Drums
2009	The Spiritual Expressions Of...	Beverly Watkins	Producer, Drums
2010	Blue & Lonesome	Alabama Slim	Producer, Drums
2012	Double Bang!	Ironing Board Sam	Producer, Mixing, Editing, Drums
2013	I Know I've Been Changed	The Giddens Sisters	Editing, Mastering
2015	Cabbage Man	Sam Frazier, Jr.	Mixing, Editing, Mastering
2017	Take Me Back	Sam Frazier, Jr.	Liner Notes

== See also ==
- List of electric blues musicians
