= Big Boy Henry =

American singer

- Born: Richard Leslie Henry; May 26, 1921; Beaufort, Carteret County, North Carolina, United States
- Died: December 5, 2004 (aged 83) Beaufort, North Carolina, United States
- Genres: Piedmont blues
- Occupations: Guitarist, singer, songwriter
- Instruments: Guitar, human voice
- Years active: 1940s–2004
- Labels: Audio Arts, Swingmaster, Hometown, Erwin, New Moon, Music Maker

Richard Leslie Henry (born May 26, 1921 – December 5, 2004), better known as Big Boy Henry, was an American Piedmont blues guitarist, singer and songwriter. His most notable recording was "Mr. President", a protest against cuts in social welfare undertaken by President Ronald Reagan. It won Henry a W. C. Handy Award.

== Life and career ==
Henry was born in Beaufort, Carteret County, North Carolina. His parents separated and, in 1933, his mother took him north to where he grew up in New Bern, North Carolina. There he befriended the country blues musician Fred Miller, and first as Miller's apprentice and later as his vocalist, Henry earned a modest living performing at local juke joints and fish suppers.

Miller later relocated to New York, and Henry made occasional trips there for joint performances. In New York, Henry met Sonny Terry and Brownie McGhee, and in 1951 he accompanied the duo on some recordings for the producer Bob Shad. The recordings were not released, with Shad claiming the tapes had been stolen, and a dejected Henry returned to the Carolinas, where he worked on fishing and oystering crews throughout most of the 1950s and 1960s. During this period he also ran a grocery store and was a part-time preacher.

In 1971, he moved back to Beaufort, where to his surprise younger musicians championed his musical talent. He was soon performing again and writing many new songs, accompanying himself on his Gibson guitar. In later years arthritis affected his guitar playing, so he often improvised, presenting a challenge to the local musicians backing him.

Henry's song "Mr. President", recorded in Greenville, North Carolina, in the early 1980s for Audio Arts Records, was a protest against cuts in social welfare undertaken by President Ronald Reagan. It won Henry a W. C. Handy Award in 1983. In 1995, he received the North Carolina Arts Council Heritage Award. He recorded a number of self-released albums in the 1980s and 1990s, often on cassette on his own Hometown Records label, which reached only a limited audience. He became a respected figure locally, mainly because of his generous nature and support of other musicians. Henry also attempted to preserve and record chanties he had sung with other fishermen who went out to catch menhaden for a living. This led to the formation of The Menhaden Chanteymen, a singing and performing group of retired fishermen. Henry's 1995 album, Poor Man's Blues, was produced by Lightnin' Wells. Towards the end of his life, the Music Maker Relief Foundation provided a monthly stipend for prescription medicine and arranged for his album Beaufort Blues to be professionally produced. He was profiled in the book Music Makers: Portraits and Songs from the Roots of America (2004).

Henry died in his hometown in December 2004, at the age of 83.

== Discography ==
=== Singles and LPs ===
- 1983, "Mr. President" / "Cherry Red (I Don't Need No Heater)", Audio Arts 007 (45-rpm)
- 1985, "Mr. Ball's Warehouse", Audio Arts 008 (7-inch EP)
- 1988, I'm Not Lying This Time: His First Recordings 1947–1952, Swingmaster 2114 (Dutch label)
- 1989, Strut His Stuff: His New Recordings, Swingmaster 2117

=== CD albums ===
Year	Title	Record label
1993	Carolina Blues Jam	Erwin Records 9301
1995	Poor Man's Blues	New Moon 9508
2002	Beaufort Blues	Music Maker 27
