= Lightnin' Wells =

- Born: Michael Wells; West Virginia, United States
- Origin: North Carolina, United States
- Genres: Piedmont blues
- Occupations: Guitarist, harmonicist, singer, one-man band, record producer
- Instruments: Guitar, vocals, ukulele, mandolin, banjo, harmonica
- Years active: Early 1970s–present
- Labels: Music Maker, various
- Website: Official website

Lightnin' Wells is an American Piedmont blues multi-instrumentalist and singer. He is a proficient musician and regularly plays various instruments in concert including the guitar, mandolin, harmonica, ukulele and banjo. At times he has performed as a one-man band. His style encompasses elements of the blues, country, gospel, old-time, bluegrass and folk. Mark Coltrain stated in Living Blues that, "You won't find a more versatile musician around – able to move deftly between country blues, old-time banjo, and novelty tunes with a single pluck. Lightnin' Wells changes the past..."

Wells has released seven solo albums and worked on the board of directors at Music Maker Relief Foundation in the organization's early years.

== Biography ==
Michael Wells was born in West Virginia, United States, and largely raised in North Carolina, where he has spent most of his life. In his early days, Wells regularly listened to the Wheeling Jamboree show on WWVA radio out of Wheeling, West Virginia. His family relocated to Goldsboro, North Carolina in 1962, and there Wells discovered and gained a life-long interest in Piedmont blues and old-time music.

He joined his first band, the Unknowns, at the age of thirteen, where he played the harmonica in an ensemble performing British Invasion inspired music. By the late 1960s, Wells had learned to play the guitar and initially tried to follow the work of artists in the folk revival movement, leading him to Bob Dylan chronologically backwards to Woody Guthrie, then Sonny Terry and Lead Belly. The first authentic Piedmont blues record he heard was a 78 recording of "Lookin' For My Woman," by Blind Boy Fuller. Wells started performing professionally in the Chapel Hill area in the early 1970s. In addition to Fuller, Wells also studied the work of the Reverend Gary Davis. As part of his ongoing musical education, Wells sought out still living Piedmont performers, which led him later to produce work by Big Boy Henry, Algia Mae Hinton and George Higgs.

In 1995, Wells made his own debut solo recording, Bull Frog Blues, which was followed by Ragtime Millionaire (1998); both released on New Moon Records. "I'll Be Coming Home Every Saturday Night", written by Turner Foddrell was one of the tracks on Ragtime Millionaire. By this time Wells was blending Piedmont and country blues utilizing a mixture of acoustic and resonator guitars, ukulele and harmonica. Wells had joined Music Maker in 1996, and in 2002 released his next album on that label. Ragged But Right included guest appearances by Cool John Ferguson on guitar and Taj Mahal on bass. Wells also began his ten-year spell on the board of directors at the Music Maker Relief Foundation. During this time Music Maker's assistance enabled Wells to perform at Playa Zancudo in Costa Rica, at Warehouse Blues and the Shakori Hills Grassroots Festival in North Carolina.

Shake 'Em on Down (2008) gave Wells further opportunity to revisit some songs of the 1920s and produce an authentic sounding album. His journey has left him with hundreds of old pieces in his musical mind, and he discovered the work of Floyd Council to add to his repertoire. Wells was not tempted to pen his own material, despite having a university degree in English. In 2005, Wells traveled to Boone, North Carolina for the first Black Banjo Gathering where he accompanied Algia Mae Hinton. Over the years Wells has performed at The Great Blue Heron Music Festival, Gathering of the Vibes (2002), Chicago Blues Festival (2000), Hampton Acoustic Blues Revival (2006), Moulin Blues Festival (1996), the Bull Durham Blues Festival (1990, 1993, 1995, 1998, and 2000), Festival for the Eno, (1981 onwards), among many others.

In 2008, Wells recorded Jump Little Children: Old Songs For Young Folks, a collection of children's music. In addition, Wells has taught blues guitar across the United States, with his goal being to entertain and educate in presenting the unique American art form. He is a regular faculty member at the Augusta Heritage Center, Port Townsend Acoustic Blues Festival and Swannanoa Gathering. Wells is a North Carolina Arts Council and American Traditions National Roster (through the Southern Arts Federation), touring artist. In 2016, Wells performed at Muddy Creek Music Hall in Winston-Salem, North Carolina.

Lightnin' Wells currently resides in Fountain, North Carolina. In July 2015, Wells was on the same bill as Ironing Board Sam and Boo Hanks at a concert in the Sarah P. Duke Gardens, Duke University, Durham, North Carolina.

His album, O Lightnin', Where Art Thou? (2017), was issued by the Germany-based Blind Lemon Records. Wells played all of the instruments used on the collection. The tracks included Wells versions of Mississippi John Hurt's "Pallet on the Floor," Jesse Fuller's "San Francisco Bay Blues" and Robert Johnson's "Love in Vain".

Filming for a documentary about Lightnin' Wells life's work of preserving (by performing) Piedmont blues and obscure, almost forgotten pre World War II music was begun in 2025, with release expected in early 2026.

== Production work ==
- Big Boy Henry, "Mr. President" / "I Don't Need No Heater" 45 (Audio Arts),1983
- Big Boy Henry, "Mr. Ball Your Warehouse Is Burning Down" EP (Audio Arts), 1985
- Algia Mae Hinton, Piedmont Blues Traditions, EP (Audio Arts), 1986
- Co-produced and performed on Big Boy Henry, Poor Man's Blues (New Moon 9508), 1995
- Algia Mae Hinton, Honey Babe: Blues, Folk Tunes and Gospel from North Carolina (Hin-Tone 82929), 1996

== Discography ==
Year	Title	Record label
1995	Bull Frog Blues	New Moon Records
1998	Ragtime Millionaire	New Moon Records
2002	Ragged But Right	Music Maker
2008	Shake 'Em on Down	CD Baby
2008	Jump Little Children: Old Songs For Young Folks	CD Baby
2017	O Lightnin', Where Art Thou?	Blind Lemon Records
2025	Foolin' Around (Lightnin' Wells and his Uke)	Self-published

== See also ==
- List of Piedmont blues musicians
