= Eddie Tigner =

American songwriter

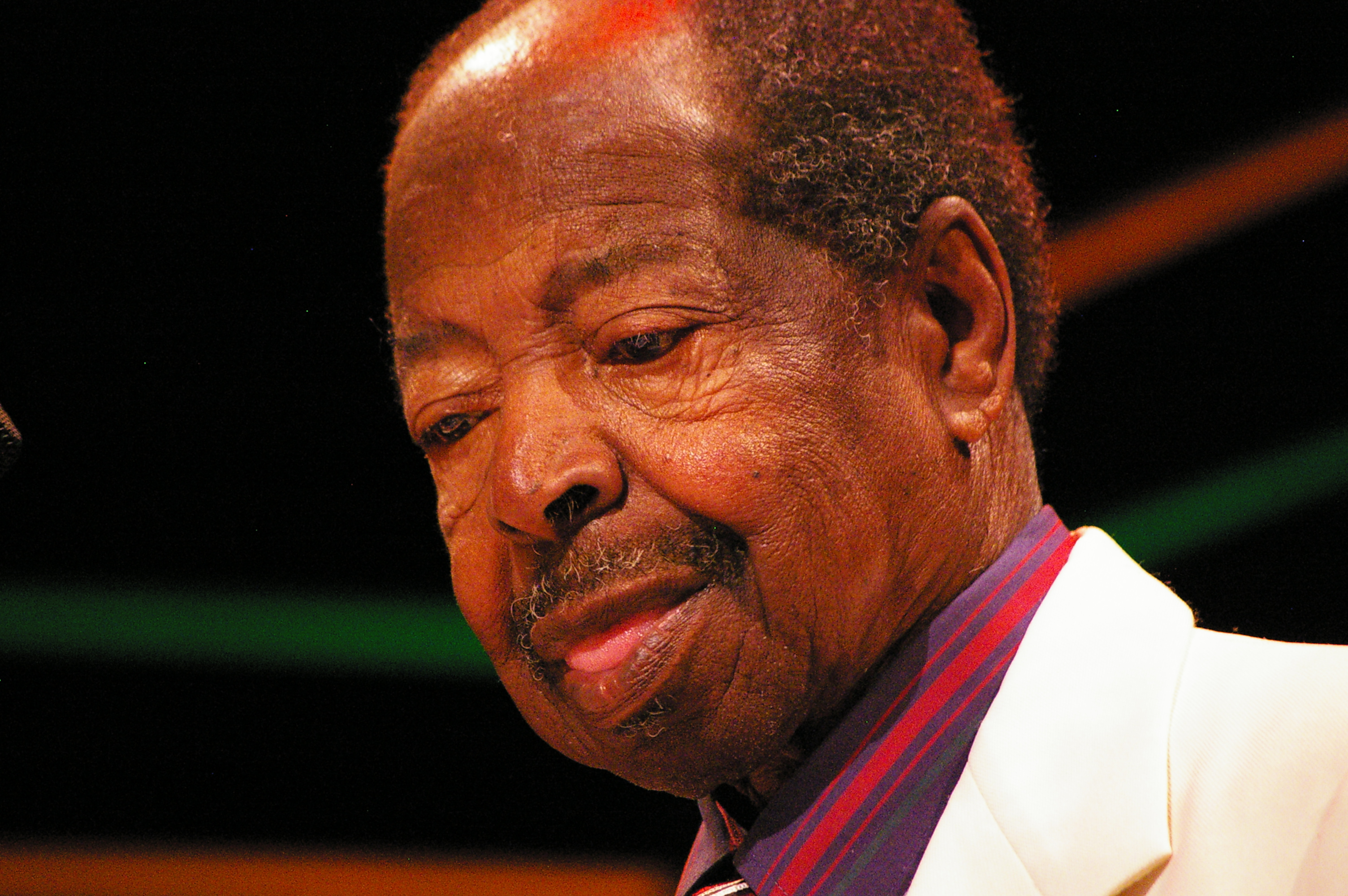
- Eddie Tigner

Background information
- Born: Ed Tigner, Jr. August 11, 1926; Macon, Georgia, United States
- Died: April 18, 2019 (aged 92)
- Genres: Blues, and originally traditional pop
- Occupation: Musician
- Instruments: Piano, keyboards, vibraphone, vocals
- Years active: 1940s–2019
- Label: Music Maker

Ed Tigner, Jr. (August 11, 1926 – April 18, 2019), better known as Eddie Tigner, was an American blues pianist, keyboardist, singer, and songwriter. He recorded two albums, both released by Music Maker, and continued to perform on stage each week, despite being in his nineties. He performed standing up at the keyboard latterly, noting "Most keyboard players sit; I can’t anymore. If I sit down to play, I'll go to sleep."

== Life and career ==
Ed Tigner, Jr. was born in Macon, Georgia, United States. In the early 1930s, Tigner heard the barrelhouse blues that his mother played at Atlanta house parties. After his father died from the effects of mustard gas poisoning he suffered in World War I, and when Tigner was six years old, the family relocated to a mining camp in Muhlenberg County, Kentucky. This followed his mother's re-marriage to a coal miner. Tigner then listened to the country and bluegrass music of that region, but also the largely African American camps had a tradition of blues music. At the age of 14, the family moved to Atlanta, Georgia. Once there, and with his mother in demand as a pianist, Tigner followed her to evening engagements at house parties and fish fries.

Tigner began military service in 1945 in the United States Army and during his term there learned to play the piano. Tigner was also in charge of booking entertainment for the servicemen. He often travelled to Baltimore to transport Bill Kenny, one of the founding members of the Ink Spots, to perform on the army base at Aberdeen Proving Ground in Maryland. Tigner also met T-Bone Walker during this time. In 1947, after his discharge he returned to Atlanta and assembled his first group, known as the Maroon Notes. In the group, Tigner played the vibraphone and they found intermittent work in Georgia and Florida. Tigner also worked in Atlanta as the pianist for the comedian Spencer "Snake" Anthony.

In 1959, Tigner joined the Ink Spots onstage during a show in Atlanta. The band had fractured upon the death of their original bass player in 1947, and various versions of the band had sprung up. Tigner's bass heavy style of playing the piano helped secure a job with them. Tigner was always keen to point out that his group had nothing to do with the original outfit, but it secured work for many years. Tigner's voice was too deep for lead vocal duties, but he ended up reciting the spoken monologues that often separated the song's verses. This led to decades of touring around the US. During this time Tigner met and played backing for Elmore James for a couple of years. After his first wife died, Tigner remarried and his second, Ollie, sometimes joined him touring the country. His stature became such that the outfit was billed as Ed Tigner's Ink Spots, but the constant touring took its toll and Tigner suffered a heart attack. He left the outfit in 1987 and returned home to Atlanta intending to semi-retire from the music industry. However, after a little while away, he was persuaded to play the blues. In 1991, Tigner commenced playing in clubs in and around Atlanta, with the encouragement of a local guitarist Danny "Mudcat" Dudeck. As a day job, Tigner worked in the kitchen at a local elementary school, and settled with his wife in a modest wooden house in Edgewood. Also on a local front, Cora Mae Bryant, the daughter of Curley Weaver, gradually became important on the Atlanta blues scene. She helped to organize "Giving It Back" festivals at the city's Northside Tavern to honor early blues artists. Mudcat Dudeck, starting in 1995, continued this organisation, with the money raised supporting a living musician, including Tigner himself in 1998.

The same year, Dudeck introduced Tigner to the Music Maker Relief Foundation. In time the Foundation helped Tigner with medical costs, supplied him with a new keyboard and helped arrange a passport. In 2003, Music Maker released Tigner's first record, Route 66, an album containing 12 songs. These included Tigner's take on standards such as "Take the "A" Train", "Stormy Monday", "C.C. Rider", and the title track, "(Get Your Kicks On) Route 66". Tigner provided vocals and piano work, as well as electric organ on several of the sides.

Tigner began touring again, appearing at the Chicago Blues Festival and Australia's Byron Bay Bluesfest, plus a six week tour of Europe in 2010. Tigner recorded his second album, Slippin' In (2009), where he gained a credit as a songwriter for the title track. Locally, Tigner started to appear regularly at both Fat Matt's Rib Shack, sometimes with Beverly Watkins, and also at the Northside Tavern with Uncle Sugar. His overseas traveling ended in 2012, four years after retiring from his school duties. Around that time Tigner noticed that he was forgetting things and after seeking medical advice found that the diagnosis was the onset of Alzheimer's disease. Nevertheless, two nights before his 89th birthday party, Tigner was in Durham, North Carolina, playing an outdoor concert alongside Albert White and other Music Maker acts. A Northside Tavern regular, Tigner continued each week to play a repertoire which included songs such as "Going Down Slow", "Help Me Make It Through the Night", and "Shake, Rattle and Roll". Despite lung troubles necessitating steering clear of smoke-filled venues, Tigner enjoyed singing and playing at his 92nd birthday at the Northside. He performed standing up at the keyboard latterly, noting "Most keyboard players sit; I can’t anymore. If I sit down to play, I'll go to sleep."

Tigner has been featured in the book Music Makers: Portraits and Songs from the Roots of America (2004), plus the Music Maker documentary film, Toot Blues. Tigner's work also appears on various compilation albums including "After Hours" on Lucerne Blues Festival 2001 and "Route 66" on We Are the Music Makers! (2014). He also played the organ and piano on Mudcat's album, The Mess Is On (2007).

Tigner died on April 18, 2019, at the age of 92.

== Discography ==
Year	Title	Record label
2003	Route 66	Music Maker
2009	Slippin' In	Music Maker
