= Mr. Wrong (disambiguation) =

Mr. Wrong is a film starring Ellen DeGeneres and Bill Pullman.

Mr. Wrong may also refer to:

- Mr. Wrong (1985 film), a New Zealand horror film also known as Dark of the Night
- Mr. Wrong, the side-project of Canadian musician Rob Wright of Nomeansno and the Hanson Brothers
- Mr. Wrong (Mr. Men), a character in the Mr. Men children's book series by Roger Hargreaves
- "Mr. Wrong" (song), a 2011 song by Mary J. Blige
- "Mr Wrong", a 1987 song by Sam Frazier Jr.
