= Alabama Slim =

American blues singer and guitarist

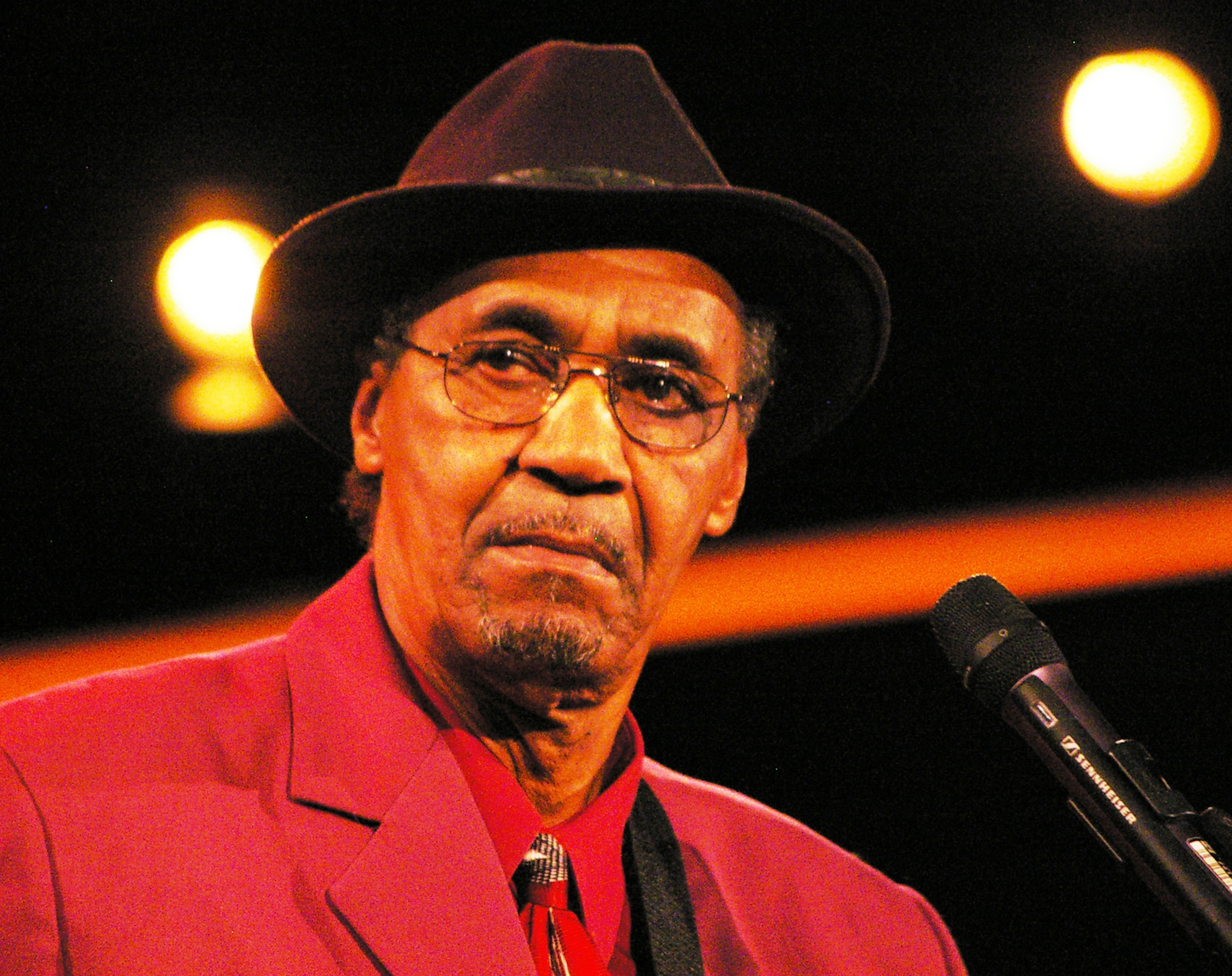

Background information
- Born: Milton Frazier; March 29, 1939 (age 87); Vance, Alabama, United States
- Genre: Blues
- Occupations: Singer, guitarist, songwriter
- Instruments: Vocals, guitar
- Years active: 1960s–present
- Labels: Music Maker, Cornelius Chapel Music

Milton Frazier (born March 29, 1939), known professionally as Alabama Slim, is an American blues singer, guitarist, and songwriter. It was noted that he "plays a minimal guitar style with a piercing attack". Playing on-and-off since the 1950s, Alabama Slim has been involved in the recording of four albums since 2007, having had assistance both from Little Freddie King and the Music Maker Relief Foundation.

== Career ==
He was born in Vance, Alabama, United States, to a train building father and a domestic working mother. His parents owned a Victrola phonograph and a small number of 78rpm records, including work by Big Bill Broonzy and Lightnin' Hopkins. Immersed in the music and culture of the blues from a young age, Alabama Slim stated "I grew up listening to the old blues since I was a child, I spent summers with my grandparents who had a farm. Them old folks would get to moanin' while they worked, and I just started moanin' with them. That's where I learned to sing."

He began playing in local juke joints before relocating in the 1965 to New Orleans, Louisiana. He worked initially for a moving company before gaining further employment with a company manufacturing cooking oil. At that time Alabama Slim met and befriended his cousin Little Freddie King, who had a lasting influence on the former's life. Slim continued to play at night until the 1970s, before leaving this pastime for a while. He noted "My cousin Freddie King was drinking hard in those days, and I was too. We jammed every once in a while. By the time the 1980s rolled around I was not doing much but Freddie always checked on me. By the 1990s I got myself together and we have been best of friends ever since..." Alabama Slim became a regular on the New Orleans blues scene again, striking in his near seven foot tall, tailored-suit appearance. In the late 1990s, the New Orleans–based drummer, Wacko Wade, had introduced the Music Maker Relief Foundation to King.

In 2005, when Hurricane Katrina struck New Orleans and its environs, Slim assisted King in their joint evacuation and relocation to a shared apartment in Dallas, Texas. Left with little possessions, the twosome spent time rearranging old songs and writing new material. They subsequently returned to New Orleans, duly chastened by their experiences but with songs influenced by those events. Tim Duffy, Music Maker's leader, then met King on the latter's relocation to New Orleans and was introduced to Slim. In December 2006, Slim and King traveled to Music Maker's headquarters in Hillsborough, North Carolina, and recorded The Mighty Flood, which was released the following year. King again collaborated with Slim on Blue & Lonesome (2010). In 2013, Slim undertook a short recording session without King at his side for the compilation album, Ironing Board Sam With Alabama Slim And Robert Lee Coleman. Slim contributed his self-penned number, "Way Down In The Bottom", to the collection.

Music Maker assisted Slim in organising tours in the United States and, with the Music Maker Blues Revue, in touring across parts of Europe including France, Belgium, Switzerland, Spain and the United Kingdom. Appearances in the U.S. incorporated a concert at New York's Lincoln Center, plus at the Telluride Blues & Brews Festival, in addition at Roots N Blues N BBQ, and was due to perform at the New Orleans Jazz & Heritage Festival in 2020, before its cancellation due to the COVID-19 pandemic in the United States.

In June 2019, Slim, King and the drummer and record producer, Ardie Dean, had a four hour long recording session in a recording studio called the Parlor in New Orleans. That initial recording was then enhanced by work by former Squirrel Nut Zippers' front man Jimbo Mathus playing keyboards and Matt Patton of Drive-By Truckers on bass guitar. The Parlor, named after the studio, was co-produced by Dean with Tim Duffy and his wife Denise. The album, a joint venture between Cornelius Chapel Records and the Music Maker Relief Foundation was released in January 2021. The track listing contained versions of "Rock Me Baby", and "Someday Baby" (the latter having been recorded by Big Joe Williams, Buddy Moss, and Sleepy John Estes among others).

He is not to be confused with Ralph Willis, who released some records in the 1940s on the Savoy label, under the pseudonym of 'Alabama Slim'.

== Discography ==
=== Albums ===
Year	Title	Record label	Additional credits
2007	The Mighty Flood	Music Maker	With Little Freddie King
2010	Blue & Lonesome	Music Maker	
2013	Ironing Board Sam With Alabama Slim And Robert Lee Coleman	APO Records	With Ironing Board Sam and Robert Lee Coleman
2021	The Parlor	Cornelius Chapel Music	
