= George Higgs =

American singer

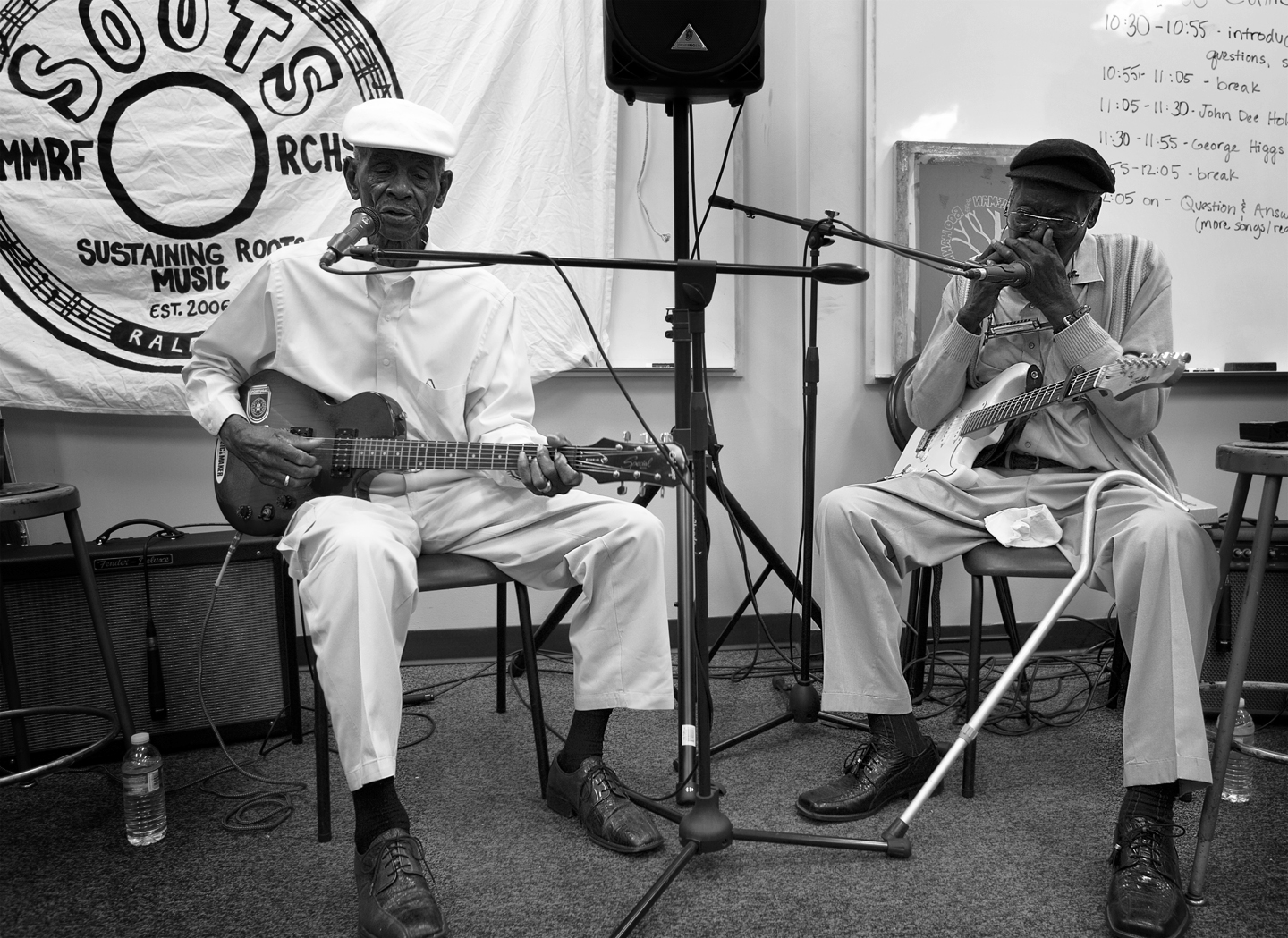
- Higgs (right) with John Dee Holeman (left), 2010

Background information
- Born: March 9, 1930; Edgecombe County, near Speed, North Carolina, United States
- Died: January 29, 2013 (aged 82) Tarboro, North Carolina, United States
- Genres: Piedmont blues
- Occupation(s): Guitarist, harmonicist, singer, songwriter
- Instrument(s): Guitar, vocals, harmonica
- Labels: Tomato Records, Music Maker

George Higgs (March 9, 1930 – January 29, 2013) was an American Piedmont blues acoustic guitarist, harmonicist, singer and songwriter. He recorded three albums in his lifetime, although he spent over sixty years performing regularly, mainly in his home State. In 1993, Higgs was granted the North Carolina Heritage Award from the North Carolina Arts Council.

== Biography ==
Higgs was born in Edgecombe County, near Speed, North Carolina, United States. Higgs joked throughout his life about Speed; "a slow town with a fast name". Born into a farming community, he was inspired to play the harmonica after watching his father, Jesse Higgs, play the instrument while singing spirituals, including "Cryin' Holy Unto the Lord". Higgs trained as a carpenter, and he grew up listening to the Grand Ole Opry, taking a liking to Uncle Dave Macon and DeFord Bailey. Higgs saw the harmonica player, Peg Leg Sam, playing nearby in Rocky Mount around the tobacco market season, and it left a favorable impression on the young Higgs. Thus inspired as a teenager to acquire his first guitar, Higgs sold his favorite squirrel dog to a neighbor to raise funds. Their close proximity meant that the hound spent more time at Higg's home than at his new owner's, so he bought the guitar and kept the company of his dog.

Having become proficient in both of his chosen musical instruments, Higgs worked as a carpenter during the day, but played at house parties, fish fries, and other local gatherings during the evenings, and at the weekend, throughout the 1940s and 1950s. He also competed in guitar playing contests in nearby Tarboro, North Carolina. During this period Higgs and his wife Bettye raised six children. In the 1960s, Higgs joined the Friendly Five Gospel Quartet, some of whose performances were broadcast on the local radio station WCPS. This switch from playing the blues to gospel was short-lived, as Higgs became despondent to note the drinking habits of some of his gospel group. He then teamed up with another local bluesman, Elester Anderson, although Anderson's premature death in the mid-1970s left Higgs to begin performing solo.

In 1993, Higgs was granted the North Carolina Heritage Award from the North Carolina Arts Council. In 1998, he made his first overseas trip as his notability grew. The same year, a videotape was released entitled Piedmont blues today : the music of Romie Plum, George Higgs and James 'Bud' Powell. However in 1999, his family lost most of their possessions in the flooding caused by Hurricane Floyd, although they rebuilt their Tarboro home.

In 2001, Higgs' debut album, Tarboro Blues, was made in collaboration with the Music Maker Relief Foundation. Most of the songs Higgs performed on Tarboro Blues were cover versions, and traditional tunes, although Higgs was credited with writing four of the collection. The album contained versions of Blind Boy Fuller's "My Hook's in the Water" and "Black and Tan"; "Greasy Greens" originally by Peg Leg Sam; and Howlin' Wolf's "I'm Worried About That". Lightnin' Wells was an associate producer and wrote the liner notes, while Taj Mahal was credited as creative consultant. Tarboro Blues was named Best Blues Album of the Year by Living Blues.

Music Maker had also previously assisted Higgs in securing a passport, provided funds for his healthcare, and supplied him with guitars. Higgs was then featured in the book Music Makers: Portraits and Songs from the Roots of America (2004). By this time his fame had spread and the musician David Holt counted Higgs among his mentors. Rainy Day followed in 2007, and Higgs was a major performer at Tarboro's 250th birthday celebration in 2010.

Raleigh Charter High School presented Higgs with a High School diploma in 2011, and around that time he was photographed on stage at the Pamlico Community College. His touring took in many venues in the United States. These included performing at the Carolina Blues Festival in Winston-Salem, North Carolina; plus the Gathering of the Vibes; the Mississippi Valley Blues Festival; the Lincoln Center for the Performing Arts in New York; plus overseas he played at the Blues to Bop Festival in Lugano, Switzerland, and in Australia.

George Higgs died in Tarboro, North Carolina, United States, on January 29, 2013, at the age of 82.

== Discography ==
Year	Title	Record label
2001	Tarboro Blues	Music Maker
2005	Tar River Flood	Tomato Records
2007	Rainy Day	Music Maker

== See also ==
- List of Piedmont blues musicians
- List of harmonicists
