= Turner Foddrell =

American singer (1928–1995)

- Born: June 22, 1928; Stuart, Virginia, United States
- Died: January 31, 1995 (aged 66) Blacksburg, Virginia, United States
- Genres: Piedmont blues, folk
- Occupations: Guitarist, singer, songwriter
- Instruments: Guitar, human voice
- Years active: 1960s–1995

Turner Foddrell (June 22, 1928 – January 31, 1995) was an American Piedmont blues and folk acoustic guitarist, singer and songwriter. He performed locally, nationally, and in Europe, both as a solo artist and with his brother, Marvin. They jointly recorded two albums in the early 1980s. In addition, he was often joined in performances by his son, Lynn.

== Life and career ==
Foddrell was born into a musical family who lived near Stuart, Virginia. His father was the multi-instrumentalist Posey Foddrell (December 9, 1898 – December 1, 1985), who played fiddle, mandolin, piano, banjo, and guitar and had a notable regional reputation. The family lived in the Stuart area for several generations and rarely traveled far from their home.

When he grew up, Foddrell owned a general store with an attached gas station on Virginia State Route 8 near the North Carolina border. He and his elder brother Marvin (July 17, 1924 – July 1, 1986) were "discovered" in the 1970s by a local DJ who found them playing an impromptu jam session in the store. They became regular performers at the Blue Ridge Folk Festival, in Ferrum, Virginia, and played at the 1982 World's Fair, in Knoxville, Tennessee. They also made appearances at blues festivals in Europe.

They were recorded by Ferrum College/BRI Records for its anthology Virginia Traditions, with Turner and Marvin playing together and individually a range of traditional songs they had learned from their father, such as "Reno Factory" and "Railroad Bill". On three occasions when the brothers performed at Berea College's Celebration of Traditional Music they included Piedmont blues fingerpicking versions of "Drifting and Dreaming" and "She's Funny That Way"; country music pieces, such as "Wildwood Flower", "In the Jailhouse Now", "Walking the Floor Over You", and "Today I Started Loving You Again"; and Chicago blues, including "Key to the Highway" and Jumpin' Gene Simmons's 1964 hit "Haunted House." They developed a cult following, without mainstream success, yet recorded a couple of albums. Marvin and Turner Foddrell's album The Original Blues Brothers was recorded on November 8 and 9, 1981, in Groningen, the Netherlands. It was released in the Netherlands by Swingmaster Records in 1984. Turner's son, Lynn, joined the brothers playing in the 1982 and 1983 performances at the Celebration of Traditional Music.

Following Marvin's death in 1986, Turner and his son continued as a duo, releasing one album.

Foddrell died of lung cancer in January 1995, at the age of 66.

Some of their recordings were available through the Blue Ridge Institute at Ferrum College. Turner's work, either with or without his brother, has appeared on various compilation albums including, Virginia Traditions: Western Piedmont Blues (1995), Virginia Traditions: Non-Blues Secular Black Music (1995), American Fogies, Vol. 1 (1996), and Classic Appalachian Blues from Smithsonian Folkways (2010).

His song, "I'll Be Coming Home Every Saturday Night", was recorded by Lightnin' Wells for his album Ragtime Millionaire (1998) and by the New Roanoke Jug Band for their album Pretty Gal's Love (2005).

The Oral History Association contains in its collection one photograph of the Foddrell Brothers performing and being interviewed and filmed. A second photograph shows a list of names of the persons who appear in the photograph. The date of the photographs is October 20, 1980.

== Discography ==
=== Albums ===
Year	Title	Record label	Billed as
1983	Patrick County Rag	Outlet Records	The Foddrell Brothers
1984	The Original Blues Brothers	Swingmaster Records	Marvin & Turner Foddrell
