= Bishop Dready Manning =

- Born: Dready Lewis Manning; August 10, 1934; Northampton County, North Carolina, U.S.
- Died: August 16, 2017 (aged 83) Roanoke Rapids, North Carolina, U.S.
- Occupation: Gospel musician

Bishop Dready Lewis Manning (August 10, 1934 – August 16, 2017) was an American singer, songwriter, guitarist, and harmonica player. He played gospel music infused with Piedmont blues elements. He was also the founder of St. Mark Holiness Church in Roanoke Rapids, North Carolina, and a North Carolina Arts Council Folk Heritage Award winner.

== Biography ==
Dready Manning was born in Northampton County, North Carolina, United States, in the farming community of Gaston. By the age of eight he was orphaned. He went to live with his aunt's family of sharecroppers who grew cotton, peanuts, and corn. Some of his uncles and cousins played blues guitar in the North Carolina Piedmont fashion. When Manning was seven years old, he began learning how to fingerpick guitar. His skills improved over time and by his teenage years Manning had earned a reputation as a master of blues guitar and harmonica. His style was influenced by Piedmont blues musicians such as Blind Boy Fuller, Brownie McGhee and Buddy Moss, and national stars including Lightnin' Hopkins, Jimmy Reed and Sonny Boy Williamson.

As a young bluesman, Manning played in clubs and sold moonshine. Having been drinking abundantly, in 1962 Manning developed esophageal varices that caused unstoppable bleeding from his nose. Some family members and neighbors, who were members of a local Holiness church, prayed over him, using the Christian ritual of laying on hands. When Manning heard their prayers, he felt the bleeding stop. He had "a converted mind right then", disavowed the blues and pledged to use his musical talents to serve God. He and his wife, known as Mother Marie, joined the Holiness congregation. Three years later they moved to Roanoke Rapids, North Carolina, and branched a St. Mark Holiness church, opening in 1975.

Manning began composing sacred songs, performing for prayer meetings and revivals, and releasing gospel recordings. With his wife and their six children he developed a distinctive gospel sound by the late 1960s. Marie Manning sang powerful old-time gospel while Bishop Manning played guitar. Along with their five children they formed the Manning Family gospel singers, featuring different family members as vocalists.

Starting circa 1970, Bishop Manning has recorded gospel 45s on Jimmy Capps' JCP, Memorial Records, Hoyt Sullivan's Su-Ann, and on his own labels Manning, B.L.M., Peatock, and Nashbrand. Some of these were reissued in 2011 in a set by Fat Possum Records' Big Legal Mess subsidiary called Converted Mind. In 1996, an album, Take One Moment At A Time, was released which presented a more modern sound, and in 1997 records under his name were released by ShurFine/Pastor Records. Through the Music Maker Relief Foundation, he recorded the album Gospel Train (2005), where he turned to play an acoustic guitar and harmonica.

Manning was a long-time host of a Sunday morning radio show on WSMY in Weldon, North Carolina.

He died in August 2017, aged 83, in Roanoke Rapids, North Carolina.

== Recognition ==
In 2003, Bishop Manning won a North Carolina Arts Council Folk Heritage Award. The Award "recognizes individuals throughout North Carolina who have demonstrated long-time contributions and commitments to the cultural life — and, in particular, the artistic expressions — of their local communities." Manning is credited with keeping an older gospel tradition alive.

Drewery N. Beale, mayor of Roanoke Rapids, proclaimed April 8, 2003, "Bishop Dready Manning Day" in that city. The Proclamation listed six celebratory clauses that document Manning's history and contributions.
