= Music Maker Relief Foundation =

American nonprofit organization

- Formation: 1994
- Legal status: Foundation
- Purpose: To Help The True Pioneers of American Music
- Headquarters: Hillsborough, North Carolina
- Leader: Tim Duffy
- Website: www.musicmaker.org

Music Maker Relief Foundation is an American non-profit, based in Hillsborough, North Carolina. Music Maker Relief Foundation was founded in 1994 by Tim and Denise Duffy to "help the true pioneers and forgotten heroes of Southern music gain recognition and meet their day-to-day needs. Music Maker presents these musical traditions to the world so American culture will flourish and be preserved for future generations."

== History ==
=== Early years ===
In 1989, while completing his studies for a master's degree in Folklore at the University of North Carolina at Chapel Hill, Tim Duffy was documenting blues musician James "Guitar Slim" Stephens for the university's Southern Folklife Collection. Stephens's health was in decline, and shortly before his death, he advised Duffy to locate a musician named Guitar Gabriel.

After his graduation, Duffy began working as a substitute teacher at a middle school in Winston-Salem, hearing an assortment of folkloric tales about Guitar Gabriel from students, until one student volunteered that Gabriel was her neighbor, living in the government housing projects of Winston-Salem. That evening, Duffy followed the student's directions to a "drink house" in the neighborhood, where he met Gabriel's nephew, Hawkeye, who took him to meet Gabriel. Duffy forged a close friendship with Gabriel, and the two began recording and performing under the name Guitar Gabriel & Brothers in the Kitchen, releasing the album Do You Know What it Means to Have a Friend? (also known as Toot Blues) on their own Karibu label in 1991.

Gabriel had been inactive in the music industry since the 1970 release of his album My South, My Blues (as Nyles Jones) on the Gemini label. He had received no royalties and was impoverished. He required almost daily assistance from Duffy, who provided transportation to medical appointments, money, and food for Gabriel and his wife. Through Gabriel, Tim and Denise Duffy made field recordings of other local blues musicians, such as Captain Luke, Macavine Hayes, Mr. Q., and Willa Mae Buckner. They lived in poor conditions and needed regular assistance. Duffy thought their culture was slipping away unnoticed by the music industry.

Tim Duffy's father, Allen Duffy, a lawyer, had represented and won a case for audio pioneer Mark Levinson, allowing him to continue working in the hi-fi industry. Levinson heard about Tim Duffy's field recordings, some reminiscent of the work of John and Alan Lomax, and invited Duffy to visit his stereo showroom in New York. After hearing the recordings, as well as the stories of the many destitute musicians, Levinson offered to remaster the tapes, which became an eight-artist CD anthology of traditional North Carolina blues entitled A Living Past. Levinson became a crusader for the cause, and solicited funds and industry connections from his friends and colleagues, which, in 1994, resulted in the incorporation of the Music Maker Relief Foundation.

=== 1995–present ===
In 1995, Tim Duffy met Eric Clapton in a Manhattan bistro, sharing some of his field recordings, as well as the philosophy and goals of the foundation, after which Clapton became a supporter, introducing artists such as B.B. King, Pete Townshend, Bonnie Raitt, Ron Wood, Lou Reed and Rosanne Cash, all of whom donated to the Music Maker Relief Foundation. Duffy was invited to the Los Angeles studio where B.B. King's album Deuces Wild was recorded and where he met Taj Mahal, who contributed to the foundation's growth and success.

By 1996, after receiving several sizable donations, Music Maker Relief Foundation had established the Musician Sustenance, Musical Development, and Cultural Access Programs, which provide food, monetary assistance, transportation to doctor's appointments and to pick up medications, home repairs (in some cases, extremely poor living conditions have warranted the relocation of the musician), performance bookings in professional venues, such as the Lincoln Center and Carnegie Hall, as well as European tours and music festivals worldwide. The success of the programs is due, in large part, to Taj Mahal, who by 1997 had become an advisory board member, artistic consultant, contributor, and co-producer for many of the artists' records. Taj Mahal headlined blues festivals in support of Music Maker, was instrumental in securing advertising in mainstream print media, as well as the creation of the "Fishin' Blues Tournament", which raises funds for the foundation. Over the next several years, many new donors and contributors were involved, allowing Duffy to expand the roster of the Music Maker Recordings label, and to release over one hundred albums, the proceeds of which the artists keep, in their entirety. Many of the label's artists have been documented in the collaborative work of artists Harvey Pekar and Gary Dumm, who have contributed artwork since 2003, and whose work was featured in a 2010 calendar, created as a fundraiser for Music Maker Relief.

In 2006, Tim Duffy saw the Carolina Chocolate Drops performing at the Shakori Hills Grassroots Festival of Music and Dance in Silk Hope, North Carolina. Duffy signed a management deal with the group and released their debut record, Dona Got a Ramblin' Mind on the Music Maker Recordings label. During Duffy's time as manager the Carolina Chocolate Drops won a Grammy Award in 2010 for Best Traditional Folk Album with their first album on Nonesuch Records, Genuine Negro Jig. The Chocolate Drops second release with Nonesuch, Leaving Eden was nominated for a Grammy.

In 2014, the Music Maker Relief Foundation celebrated its 20th anniversary with an exhibit of 28 photographs of Music Maker artists. The exhibit was previewed at the New York Public Library for the Performing Arts. A double-disc compilation album and 144-page photo book is also set to be released in honor of the foundation's anniversary.

On October 27, 2014 PBS NewsHour aired segment on the Music Maker Relief Foundation, showing William R. Ferris say, "They provide a model for what our nation should be doing. The New Deal under FDR did this for the entire nation, and Tim Duffy thankfully is doing it for the community of blues artists."

== Artists (past and present on Music Maker Recordings) ==
- Sheila Kay Adams
- Rachel Ammons
- Little Pink Anderson
- Harvey Dalton Arnold
- Etta Baker
- Terry "Harmonica" Bean
- Robert Belfour
- Adolphus Bell
- Larry Bellorin & Joe Troop
- Skeeter Brandon
- Kelley Breiding
- Essie Mae Brooks
- Leonard "Lowdown" Brown
- Tommy Brown
- Cora Mae Bryant
- David Bryant
- Precious Bryant
- Willa Mae Buckner
- Randy Burns
- Charles "Sugar Harp" Burroughs
- Dr. G. W. Burt
- Lil' Joe Burton
- David Butler
- Carolina Chocolate Drops
- The Carolina Cutups
- Gail Ceasar
- Pat "Mother Blues" Cohen
- Robert Lee Coleman
- The Como Mamas
- George Conner
- Pura Fe Crescioni
- George Daniels
- Johnny Ray Daniels
- Clarence "Bluesman" Davis
- James B. Davis
- Ardie Dean
- Dedicated Men of Zion
- Ernie K-Doe
- Bishop Dready Manning
- Paul Duffy
- Mr. Frank Edwards
- Faith & Harmony
- Willie Farmer
- Pura Fé
- Cool John Ferguson
- Robert Finley
- Dom Flemons
- Benton Flippen
- Cora Fluker
- Sam Frazier Jr.
- Preston Fulp
- Guitar Gabriel
- Lee Gates
- Rhiannon Giddens
- Elder James Goins
- Boo Hanks
- Macavine Hayes
- Big Boy Henry
- George Higgs
- Algia Mae Hinton
- Hermon Hitson
- Carl Hodges
- John Dee Holeman
- Big Ron Hunter
- Ironing Board Sam
- David Johnson
- Elder Anderson Johnson
- Todd Jones
- Kever's Long House Singers
- Little Freddie King
- Pernell King
- Sonny Boy King
- Willie King
- Clyde Langford
- The Legendary Singing Stars
- Guitar Lightnin' Lee
- Lucille Lindsay
- John "Lakota John" Locklear
- Captain Luke
- Marie Manning
- Jimbo Mathus
- William Maxwell
- Jerry "Boogie" McCain
- Leyla McCalla
- Dave McGraw & Mandy Fer
- Rufus McKenzie
- Nora Milner
- W.C. Minger IV
- Cary Morin
- Mudcat
- Music Maker Blues Revue
- Chicago Bob Nelson
- Sonny Boy Nelson
- Bubba Norwood
- Jack Owens
- Neal Pattman
- Ben Payton
- Lena Mae Perry & the Branchettes
- Pinetop Perkins
- Shelton Powe
- Rip Lee Pryor
- Lil' Jimmy Reed
- Abe Reid
- Thomas Rhyant
- Sugar Chile Robinson
- Sol Roots
- Jahue Rorie
- Earnest "Guitar" Roy Jr
- Carl Rutherford
- Cueselle Settle (Mr. Q.)
- Larry Shores
- Patrick Sky
- Slewfoot
- Alabama Slim
- Drink Small
- Albert Smith
- Elnora Spencer
- Martha Spencer
- Sol
- Cootie Stark
- James "Guitar Slim" Stephens
- Samuel Turner Stevens
- Sweet Betty
- Taj Mahal
- Brother Theotis Taylor
- Benjamin Tehoval
- Fred Thomas
- Robert Thomas
- Eddie Tigner
- Reverend Perry Tillis
- Othar Turner
- Ernie Vincent
- The Glorifying Vines Sisters
- Freeman Vines
- Tad Walters
- J. W. Warren
- Beverly Watkins
- Lightnin' Wells
- Pete Whicher
- Pat Wilder
- Jontavious Willis
- Aretta Woodruff
- Whistlin' Britches
- Albert White
- Pat Wilder
- Ernie Williams
- John Lee Zeigler

== See also ==
- List of record labels
