= Billy Wright (musician) =

American singer (1918–1991)

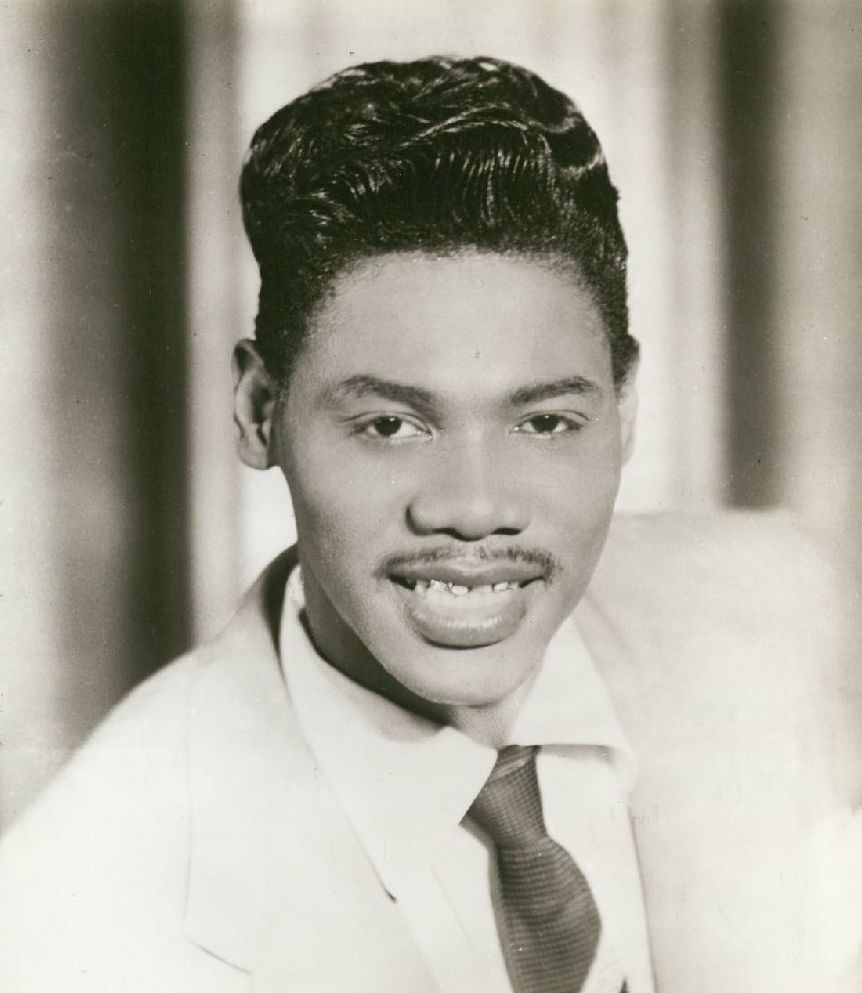

Background information
- Also known as: Prince of the Blues
- Born: William Wright; May 21, 1918; Atlanta, Georgia, United States
- Died: October 28, 1991 (aged 73) Atlanta, Georgia, U.S.
- Genres: Jump blues; R&B
- Occupation: Singer
- Years active: 1930s or 1940s–1991
- Labels: Savoy; Peacock

William "Billy" Wright (May 21 or 23, 1918 – October 28, 1991) was an American singer. He is considered one of Little Richard's greatest influences in his formative years.

== Biography ==
Wright was born in Atlanta, Georgia. There is uncertainty over his year of birth. He claimed to have been born in 1932, but the researchers Bob Eagle and Eric LeBlanc have stated that he was born in 1918, on the basis of official records and a newspaper obituary; other sources suggest 1928. As a child, Wright excelled at singing gospel music in his local church.

Wright's first musical opportunity came in the tent shows that were popular at the time. In these events, men dressed in drag and acted and sang in minstrel shows. He worked as a dancer and as a female impersonator. Sometimes, he even balanced a chair on his chin while he sang. This led to the flamboyant persona he adopted for his short career that he passed onto Little Richard. It also gave him experience in make-up which came in handy with his performances. After a few years as a female impersonator, Wright focused more on singing, performing at Atlanta's 81 Theater. The saxophonist Paul "Hucklebuck" Williams saw Wright's performance when the two shared a bill with Charles Brown and Wynonie Harris. Williams recommended him to Herman Lubinsky of Savoy Records.

His first record, "Blues for My Baby", recorded with Howard Collander's orchestra, rose to number 3 on the Billboard R&B chart in 1949. He had three more records on the R&B chart: "You Satisfy" (number 9, 1949), "Stacked Deck" (number 9, 1951), and "Hey, Little Girl" (number 10, 1951). A flamboyant performer, he was known as the "Prince of the Blues" throughout his career. He was a key figure in Atlanta blues after World War II and had a major influence on the rock-and-roll pioneer Little Richard, whom he helped get his first recording contract in 1951. In the early 1950s, the openly gay Wright also helped in establishing Richard's look, advising him to use pancake makeup on his face and wear his hair in a long-haired pompadour style similar to his.

In 1954, Wright signed a contract with Peacock Records, owned by Don Robey, in Houston, Texas. He made his last recordings in 1959. He primarily worked as an MC in Atlanta but continued to perform until he suffered a stroke. He died of a pulmonary embolism just before his 1991 Halloween show at the Royal Peacock in Atlanta. He was buried in South-View Cemetery.

== Personal life ==
Wright was openly homosexual.

== Discography ==
=== Singles ===
- "Blues for My Baby" / "You Satisfy" (Savoy 710), 11/1949
- "Man's Brand Boogie" / "Beg-a-Dog" (Atlanta 6000), 1950
- "I Keep Drinkin'" / "Billy's Boogie Blues" (Savoy 715),1950
- "Back Biting Woman" / "Thinkin' Blues" (Savoy 733), 1950
- "After Dark Blues" / "Heavy Hearted Blues" (Savoy 741), 1951
- "'Fore Day Blues" / "Empty Hands" (Savoy 761), 1951
- "Mean Old Wine" / "Keep Your Hands on Your Heart" (Savoy 776), 11/1951
- "Stacked Deck" / "Mercy Mercy" (Savoy 781), 1951
- "Hey Little Girl" / "Gotta Find My Baby" (Savoy 810), 1951
- "New Kind of Lovin'" / "When the Wagon Comes" (Savoy 819), 1952
- "Turn Your Lamps Down Low" / "Drinkin' and Thinkin'" (Savoy 827), 1952
- "Married Woman's Boogie" / "Every Evening" (Savoy 837), 1952
- "If I Didn't Love You" / "Goin' Down Slow" (Savoy 870), 12/1952
- "After Awhile" / "Four Cold Cold Walls" (Savoy 1100), 5/1953
- "Live the Life" / "I Remember" (Savoy 1127), 4/1954
- "Bad Luck, Heartaches, and Trouble" / "The Question" (Peacock 1657), 7/1955
- "Have Mercy Baby" / "I Love You Sweetheart" (Carrollton 801), 1959

=== Other recordings ===
- "Walking the Blues" (Savoy), unreleased, September 23, 1949
- "Ride on Little Girl" (Savoy), unreleased, July 1, 1950
- "Misfortune Blues" (Savoy), unreleased, April 24, 1950
- "Restless Blues" (Savoy), unreleased, 1951 (included on Savoy LP-1146)
- "This Love of Mine" (Savoy), unreleased, 1951 (included on Savoy LP-1146)
- "If I Had My Life to Live Over" (Savoy), unreleased, 1952 (included on Savoy LP-1146)
- "Sad Hour Blues" (Savoy), unreleased, 1952 (included on Savoy LP-1146)
- "Do Something for Me", recorded live at the Harlem Theater, Atlanta, Georgia, 1952 (included on the album Stacked Deck)
- "Keep Your Hand on Your Heart and Your Mind on Me" (Savoy), 1953 (included on Savoy LP-2255)
- "Will You Need Me" (Savoy), unreleased, 1954 (included on Savoy LP-1146)
- "Baby Don't You Want a Man Like Me" (Peacock), unreleased, 1955
- "Let's Be Friends" (Peacock), unreleased, 1955
- Titles unknown (Fury/Fire), unreleased, 1959

=== Albums ===
- Stacked Deck (Route 66 KIX-13, 1980)
- Goin' Down Slow (Savoy LP-1146, 1984)
- Various artists, Southern Blues: Roots of Rock and Roll, Volume 11 (Savoy LP-2255, 1985)
- Billy Wright/Little Richard: Baby Don't You Want a Man Like Me (Ace CHA 193, 1987)
- Goin' Down Slow (Savoy Jazz/Denon SV-0257, 1994), CD release/reissue
- The Chronological Billy Wright 1949-1951 (Melodie Jazz/Classics [Blues & Rhythm Series] 5046, 2003)
- Have Mercy Baby (Blue City BCCD-810, 2005), including his Peacock, Carrollton, and Atlanta recordings
- Billy's Boogie Blues (His Complete Savoy Singles A's & B's 1949-1954) (Jasmine JASMCD-3174, 2020)
- Blues For My Baby (Collected Recordings 1949-1959) (Acrobat ADDCD-3485, 2023) 2-CD
