= Precious Bryant =

American singer-songwriter

Precious Bryant (née Bussey; January 4, 1942 – January 12, 2013) was an American country blues, gospel, and folk singer and guitarist. Bryant is described as one of Georgia's great blueswomen. She played Piedmont fingerstyle guitar.

Bryant was born in Talbot County, Georgia, United States. She was the third child of nine and first became interested in singing by performing at her local Baptist church with her sisters. Bryant learned to play guitar from her father and uncle before dropping out of high school in eleventh grade and beginning to perform wherever she could. Her uncle was blues musician George Henry Bussey. She was first recorded by folklorist George Mitchell in 1967, who described her as "Georgia musical treasure." In 1983, she performed at the Chattahoochee Folk Festival, and soon began playing at local, regional, and international venues to a growing fanbase.

In 1995, Bryant met Tim Duffy and became involved with the Music Maker Relief Foundation, who assisted her in booking global tours and shows and increasing her following through events like Blues to Bop in Lugano, Switzerland, Port Townsend Blues Festival, and Chicken Raid in Atlanta, Georgia.

Bryant released three solo albums. Her 2002 debut, Fool Me Good, was nominated for two Blues Music Awards, in the categories Acoustic Blues Album of the Year and Best New Artist Debut. In 2006, she was nominated for a similar award for Traditional Blues Female Artist of the Year, as were Koko Taylor, Maria Muldaur and the winner of the award, Etta James. Her song "Morning Train" was featured on the soundtrack of the 2007 film Black Snake Moan.

Bryant died on January 12, 2013, in Columbus, Georgia, of complications from diabetes and congestive heart failure.

== Discography ==
- Fool Me Good (2002) – Terminus
- The Truth (2004) – Terminus
- My Name Is Precious (2005) – Music Maker

Bryant was first recorded in 1969 by George Mitchell in Waverly Hall, Georgia. Three songs from that session were released on 7" vinyl by Fat Possum Records, under the title George Mitchell Collection, vol. 37.
