= Lee Gates =

American singer (1937–2020)

- Born: Brice Lee Gates; December 20, 1937; Pontotoc, Mississippi, U.S.
- Died: April 15, 2020 (aged 82) Milwaukee, Wisconsin, U.S.
- Genres: Blues
- Occupations: Guitarist, singer, songwriter
- Instruments: Guitar, vocals
- Years active: 1960s–present
- Label: Music Maker
- Website: www.facebook.com/LeeGatesBluesman/

Brice Lee Gates (December 20, 1937 – April 15, 2020) was an American blues guitarist, singer, and songwriter. The cousin of fellow bluesman Albert Collins, Gates released three albums on the Music Maker label. Gates performed for almost sixty years, for the bulk of that time being resident in Milwaukee, Wisconsin.

== Biography ==
He was born the son of Brice and Inez Gates in Pontotoc, Mississippi, United States. Gates first heard the blues as a young child, and grew to appreciate the music created by B.B. King, John Lee Hooker, and Muddy Waters. He later traveled to Randy's Record Shop in Memphis, Tennessee, gaining valuable guidance from the other blues players of that time. Further assistance came from both of his parents who played both blues and country on guitar. His mother supplied Gates with his first guitar when he was aged fourteen.

He moved to Milwaukee in 1959, whilst in his early twenties, and started playing the guitar and singing in local juke joints. Although he knew that Albert Collins was his cousin, they did not meet until 1974. Gates stated that "My daddy’s brother had a lot of kids out there in Texas. I never met them as a child, but we all knew of each other. When Albert came to Milwaukee I showed him around and we did some gigs together. Every time he came to town we would go out and eat supper together, he was a good friend to me". Gates found employment with the house band at Wilson's Club in Milwaukee, and remained there for 15 consecutive years. Over the years Gates has performed across the Midwest, plus his traveling has led him to play in California, Kansas, Alabama, and in Europe. He also played alongside Sonny Boy Williamson II, who also lived in Milwaukee for a while.

Growing tired of a lack of recognition, Gates contacted Tim Duffy of the Music Maker Relief Foundation, and stated that he intended to travel to North Carolina with the view of recording an album. Duffy recommended he meet the drummer and record producer, Ardie Dean, in Huntsville, Alabama. Eventually, Gates arrived early one morning and the proposed album, Lee Gates and the Alabama Cotton Kings (2005), was recorded in three hours. Meanwhile, the Foundation went on to provide monies for Gates' prescription medication, gave him two guitars and ultimately supplied the resources for Gates to record two more albums. In addition, they arranged for Gates to tour in Australia and play various US music festivals.

Gates next album was Black Lucy's Deuce (2006). Cool John Ferguson played guest guitar on the recording. Touring with Lucy was his third album, with the said Lucy in both titles being the name of Gates guitar. Gates had reason to complain about the lack of opportunity to play at Summerfest. He noted in an interview on the matter that, "I don't get the credit I deserve here. I've been playing 50-something years. There's discrimination at Summerfest. I shouldn't need to have a CD out to be paid $700 at Summerfest. If they want you to have CDs, they should pay you like they pay the professional people".

Along the way, Gates played with Albert Collins and Hubert Sumlin, and was a regular weekly performer at the Six Points Pub in West Allis, Wisconsin.

== Death ==
Gates daughter reported that he died in his sleep in a nursing home on April 15, 2020. He was aged 82.

== Discography ==
Year	Title	Record label
2005	Lee Gates and the Alabama Cotton Kings	Music Maker
2006	Black Lucy's Deuce	Music Maker
2006	Touring With Lucy	Music Maker
