= Algia Mae Hinton =

- Born: Algia Mae O'Neal; August 29, 1929; Johnston County, North Carolina, U.S.
- Died: February 8, 2018 (aged 88) Middlesex, North Carolina, U.S.
- Genre: Piedmont blues
- Occupations: Guitarist, vocalist

Algia Mae Hinton (née O'Neal; August 29, 1929 – February 8, 2018) was an American Piedmont blues guitarist and vocalist, based in Johnston County, North Carolina, United States.

== Biography ==
She was the youngest child of Alexander and Ollie O'Neal and grew up in an area known as the O'Neal Tri-Township, named after the slave-holders who originally owned the land. Her father had been a tenant farmer and eventually earned enough to buy a home and some land in the township. At age nine, Algia Mae learned the guitar from her mother, who was a singer and a guitarist expert in the Piedmont finger-picking style, and who often played at family gatherings, house parties, and services at the local congregation. From her father, who was a dancer, Algia Mae learned buck dancing and the two-step.

Algia Mae married Millard R. Hinton in 1950. They subsequently moved to Raleigh, where they had seven children. The marriage lasted until 1965, when Millard Hinton was killed. At this point, Algia Mae moved with her children back to the O'Neal township and earned income as a field laborer. In the meantime, she played at house parties in Johnston County, North Carolina and for her children.

Hinton met the folklorist Glenn Hinson in 1978, who arranged for her performance at that year's North Carolina Folklife Festival. She subsequently performed at the National Folk Festival, the University of Chicago Folk Festival, and in 1985 at an event called "Southern Roots" at Carnegie Hall that featured Delta and Piedmont blues artists.' In 1998, she made her only trip to Europe performing for the Blues Al Femminile series in Turin, Italy. She became known for her guitar playing and her buck dancing, often playing her guitar behind her head as she danced. In 1983, she demonstrated these skills in the Mike Seeger produced film Talking Feet; Solo Southern Dance - Flatfoot, Buck and Tap released by filmmaker Les Blanks in 1992.

Hinton received a North Carolina Folk Heritage Award from the North Carolina Arts Council in 1992. She was a beneficiary of the Music Maker Relief Foundation, who also released her 1999 release, Honey Babe. She died on February 8, 2018, at home in Middlesex, North Carolina. In 2018 the Killer Blues Headstone Project placed the headstone for Hinton at her family's plot.

== Discography ==
- Eight Hands and Holy Steps; Early Dance Tunes and Songs Of Praise from North Carolina's Black Tradition: (LP compilation) featured performer - North Carolina Museum of History, 1979
- Piedmont Folk Traditions: Audio Arts 009, 1985. 7" extended play.
- Honey Babe; Blues, Folk Tunes and Gospel from North Carolina: Hin-Tone 82929, 1996. CD.
- Honey Babe: Music Maker Series 91005–2, 1999. CD.
