= Sam Frazier Jr. =

American musician (1943–2021)

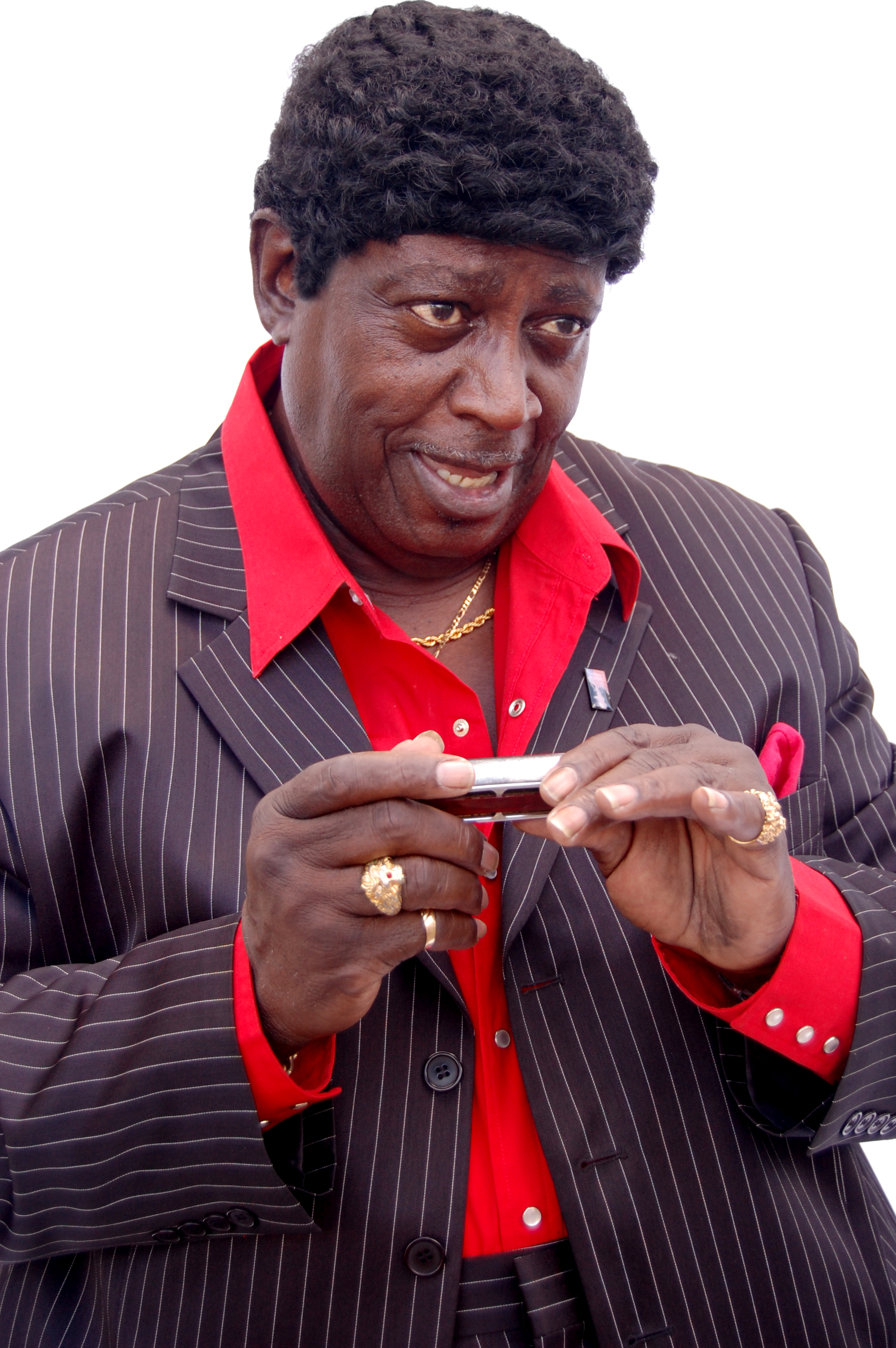
Sam Frazier Jr. in 2011

Sam Frazier, Jr. (August 12, 1943 – March 23, 2021) was an American blues singer, songwriter, guitarist and harmonica player.

== Early life ==
Frazier was born in the small mining town of Edgewater, Alabama, near Birmingham. His parents were Teretta and coal miner Sam Frazier, Sr. Sam had four sisters and one brother. As a young man, he knew Sonny Boy Williamson through his mother's bar, and Williamson gave him his first harmonica and lesson. At the age of 17, Frazier moved to his uncle's plantation in Linden, Alabama, where he completed high school.

== Career ==
While playing at a club in Birmingham, he was spotted by local DJ Maurice King. King arranged an audition with a talent agent, who took Sam and his sister to New York City, where he recorded his first record entitled You Got Me Uptight. The track was recorded at a studio on Broadway, and released on a 45-rpm single.

In 2017, Music Maker released his album, Take Me Back, containing 16 tracks.

Sam Frazier died of heart failure on March 23, 2021, after a period of hospital treatment for diabetes and a lung infection.
