= Adolphus Bell =

American musician (1944–2013)

- Born: June 5, 1944; Birmingham, Alabama, United States
- Died: October 28, 2013 (aged 69) Birmingham, Alabama, United States
- Genres: Electric blues
- Occupations: One-man band, singer, songwriter
- Instruments: Guitar, vocals, drums
- Years active: 1960s–2009
- Label: Music Maker

Adolphus Bell (June 5, 1944 – October 28, 2013) was an American electric blues musician, best known as a one-man band. He performed in a professional capacity for five decades and released two albums on the Music Maker label. He also played at various music festivals.

The music reviewer, Jim DeKoster, writing in Living Blues magazine, noted that "Adolphus Bell's music stands so well on its own merits that the CD listener soon forgets that he's listening to a one-man band. He's got the same sort of idiosyncratic appeal as Juke Boy Bonner or Guitar Gabriel".

== Biography ==
Bell was the son of a coal miner who died two months before Adolphus was born in Birmingham, Alabama. The young Bell later worked on local farms. He moved with his mother to Pittsburgh, Pennsylvania, in 1962, and learned to play the guitar from their neighbor George Benson, eventually joining his "All Stars" band as a bassist. During the 1960s he played around the city with his own quintet called Adolphus Bell and the Upstarts, who opened one show for Bobby Bland. He dubbed his 1960 Gibson guitar "Pawnshop", as it spent almost as much time there as Bell himself had to play the instrument. Discouraged with the unreliability of his bandmates, he experimented with singing while playing guitar, bass drum and high-hat himself. He played in Pittsburgh, then began touring the country in a station wagon he bought with lottery winnings. He painted "One Man Band" on both sides to advertise his music.

Bell moved with his sisters to Flint, Michigan, around 1970 and continued playing, supplementing club gigs with street performances and bookings at senior centers and jailhouses. He also spent a lot of time on the road. During an extended visit to Atlanta, Georgia in the mid-1970s, Bell was arrested for playing without a permit, but public pressure on Mayor Jackson led to an eventual order that police should leave him alone.

In the late 1970s, Bell headed west to try his luck in Los Angeles and Las Vegas. He worked as a regular casino employee and put his music on a back burner. The highlight of his sabbatical was a $200 tip from Telly Savalas. He eventually packed up his station wagon and traveled back to Alabama. After a brief stay in Birmingham he settled in Gadsden in 1980 and took a day job at a chicken plant, while he pursued blues gigs at night. He returned to Atlanta in the late 1980s and landed a regular booking as a "street busker" at Underground Atlanta. As the years passed the old station wagon was traded for a brown van and Bell continued to travel and play in the South. After the 1996 Summer Olympics, he returned to Birmingham.

In 2004, Bell was contacted by the Music Maker Relief Foundation, which organized international tours and produced his debut album, Mississippi Rubberleg. The release included tracks such as Bell's versions of "Johnny B. Goode", "Ain't No Sunshine", and "Bring It On Home to Me". The Music Maker connection saw Bell appear the same year at the King Biscuit Blues Festival in Helena, Arkansas. Bell went on to perform throughout Argentina, Australia, Europe and the US, including at the Lincoln Center in New York and the Byron Bay Bluesfest in Australia. His second album, One Man Band, was released in 2006.

Bell appeared, along with a number of Music Maker roster artists, in the 2008 Machipongo Films produced documentary, Toot Blues. Bell's recorded work was included on a couple of compilation albums; Music Maker: Slavery, Prison, Women... (2007) and Biscuits for Your Outside Man (2016). In addition to his playing, Bell was renowned for his Mashed Potato and Mississippi Longleg dance moves.

Bell continued to travel and perform until the effects of his lung cancer necessitated him remaining in Birmingham. The Foundation continued to assist Bell with his expenses. He died from his illness in October 2013 and was buried at Oakland Cemetery.

== Discography ==
| Year | Title | Record label |
|---|---|---|
| July 2005 | Mississippi Rubberleg | Music Maker |
| January 2006 | One Man Band | Music Maker |
