= The Menhaden Chanteymen =

The Menhaden Chanteymen is a musical group based out of Carteret County, North Carolina. They are a group of retired African-American commercial fishermen who publicly perform the work songs they used when hauling nets.

Their work draws from the genres of hymns, gospel, blues, and barbershop quartet songs. In 1990 the Menhaden Chanteymen recorded a collection of maritime work songs, "Won't You Help Me to Raise 'Em: Authentic Net Hauling Songs from an African-American Fishery," for Global Village Music.

== Awards ==
The group won a 1991 North Carolina Folk Heritage Award in the category of Folk/Traditional Music.
