= Jontavious Willis =

American blues singer and songwriter

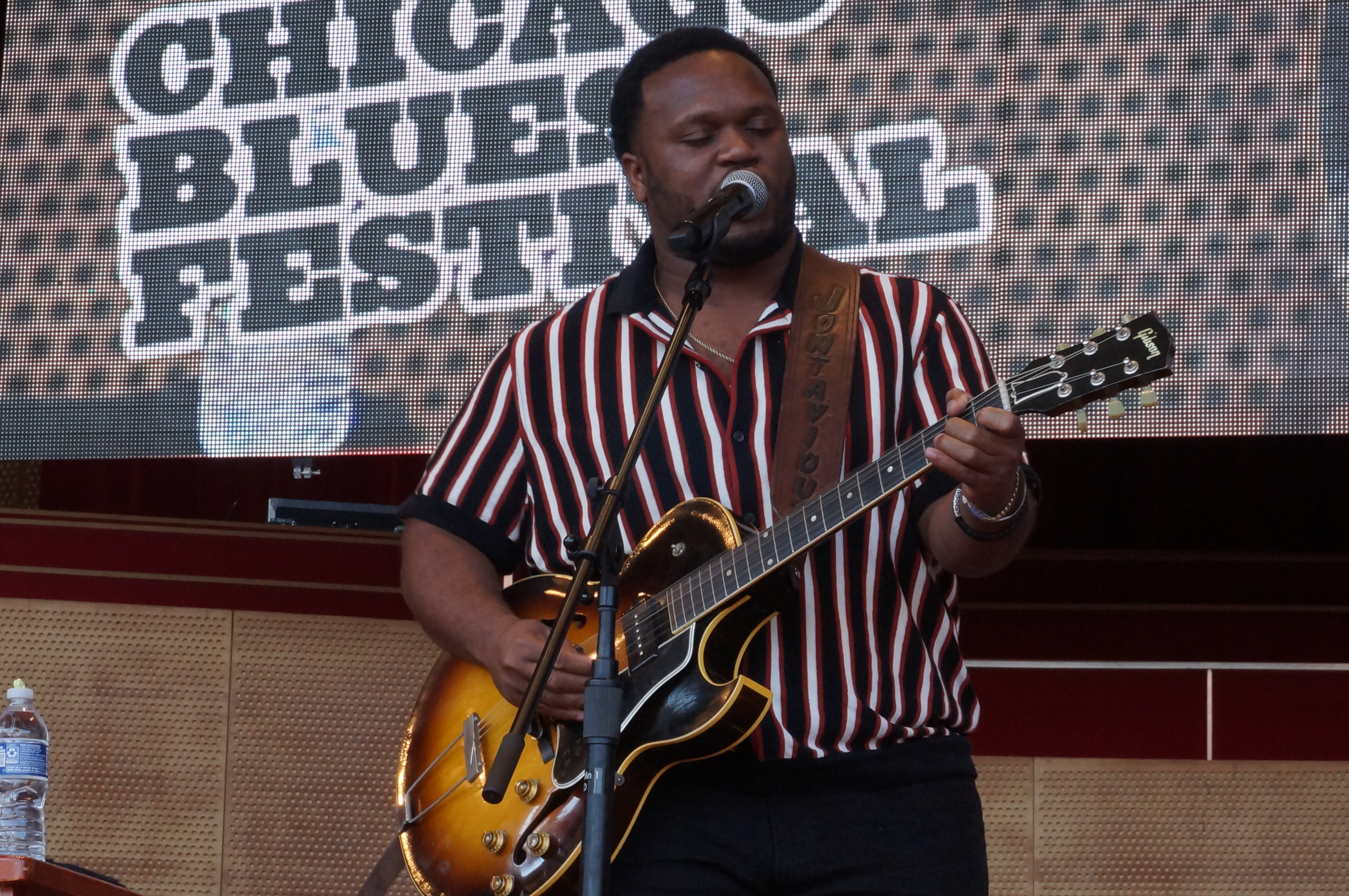
- Jontavious Willis at Chicago Blues Festival in 2023

Background information
- Born: 1996 (age 29–30); Greenville, Georgia, United States
- Genres: Country blues
- Occupations: Singer, guitarist, songwriter, multi-instrumentalist
- Instruments: Vocals, guitar, harmonica, banjo
- Years active: 2014–present
- Website: jontaviouswillis.com

Jontavious Willis (born 1996) is an American country blues singer, guitarist, songwriter, and multi-instrumentalist. Willis has released three albums to date, with his sophomore effort, Spectacular Class, debuting at number 12 in the Billboard Blues Albums Chart in May 2019.

He has been mentored through his early career by Keb' Mo', and Taj Mahal.

== Biography ==
Jontavious Willis was born in Greenville, Georgia, United States. He grew up singing gospel music, alongside his grandfather, at his local Mount Pilgrim Baptist Church. At the age of 14, Willis watched an online video of Muddy Waters performing "Hoochie Coochie Man" and was drawn towards blues music. He learned to play many styles of country blues including Delta, Piedmont, and Texas, eventually becoming adept on the guitar as a fingerpicker, flatpicker and slide player. He developed further in his teens towards an autodidactic multi-instrumentalist. In addition to the guitar, Willis taught himself to play the harmonica and five string banjo. He studied at Columbus State University, majoring in sociology and anthropology.

His playing progressed and he was given a big opportunity in 2015 when Taj Mahal invited Willis onto the stage to perform. Taj Mahal stated afterwards, "That's my Wonderboy, the Wunderkind". The exposure led to appearances at music festivals and Willis self released his debut album, Blue Metamorphosis, in April 2017. Blue Metamorphosis got favorable reviews from both Living Blues and Blues & Rhythm magazines. Paul Oscher stated "When I heard him play I said to myself: this is how the blues, as I know it, is going to stay alive." In 2018, the album earned recognition from the Blues Foundation through the International Blues Challenge, where it received the 'Best Self-Produced CD Award'.

In 2017, Keb' Mo' had partnered up with Taj Mahal to release a joint album, TajMo. It won the 2018 Grammy Award for Best Contemporary Blues Album. On the resulting promotional tour, Willis played as the support act for the two seasoned blues men on several dates.

On April 5, 2019, Willis released his follow up album, Spectacular Class. The album was issued on Kind of Blue Music. Taj Mahal was credited as executive producer and Keb' Mo' as producer. The collection contained ten sides with the lyrical content all penned by Willis. He provided vocals and acoustic guitar (fingerpicker/flatpicker/slide) with Keb' Mo' on electric guitar, Eric Ramey on bass, Phil Madeira on keyboards, plus Martin Lynds and Thaddeus Witherspoon on drums. Spectacular Class debuted at number 12 in the Billboard Blues Albums Chart in May 2019, and was nominated for the 2020 Grammy Award for Best Traditional Blues Album.

Tour dates for 2019 and beyond include concerts in the US, Switzerland, Denmark, Norway, Canada, and Puerto Rico.

== Discography ==
=== Albums ===
Year	Title	Record label
2017	Blue Metamorphosis	Self released
2019	Spectacular Class	Kind of Blue Music
2024	West Georgia Blues	Strolling Bones Records

== See also ==
- List of country blues musicians
