= Ironing Board Sam =

American singer

- Born: Samuel Moore; July 17, 1939 (age 86); Rock Hill, South Carolina, United States
- Genres: Electric blues
- Occupations: Keyboardist, singer, songwriter
- Instruments: Keyboards, piano
- Years active: Late 1950s–present
- Labels: Orleans Records, various, Music Maker

Samuel Moore (born July 17, 1939), who performs and records as Ironing Board Sam, is an American electric blues keyboardist, singer and songwriter, who has released a small number of singles and albums. His musical career, despite several low points, has spanned over fifty years, and he released a new album in 2012. "I'll tell you one thing, it's the blues," he stated. "That's why I look like a blues man now."

One commentator, describing Ironing Board Sam's 1996 album, Human Touch, noted that he "has a surprisingly smooth and effective croon and his piano playing, while subdued, is still remarkable."

== Biography ==
Moore was born in Rock Hill, South Carolina, United States. He was the son of a sharecropper and his mother died when he was around three years old. In his teens, Moore learned to play the pump organ from his stepmother and would cut lawns to make extra money, often leaving enough time to play his customers’ pianos. While concentrating initially on boogie-woogie and gospel music, he learned the electronic organ before graduating to playing the blues in Miami, Florida. After relocating to Memphis, Tennessee, in 1959, he formed a band and got his stage name from his practice of strapping his legless keyboard to an ironing board for performances. He disliked his stage name, but he later turned it to an advantage by giving away ironing boards at some of his concerts. In 1962, he was backed by a band containing the young Jimi Hendrix.

He moved around the United States trying to get a recording contract, eventually issuing a handful of singles for Atlantic, Styletone and Holiday Inn in the late 1960s and early 1970s. In the 1960s, he ended up in Nashville, playing in Club Del Morocco. His trio was playing in the upstairs level of the club while Jimi Hendrix was playing below. Ironing Board Sam recalls, “When Jimi got done with his gig, he'd come up and play with me. Other musicians would come in to hear what we were doing. We'd be playing all night.” He also performed on Night Train in the mid-1960s. The show ran from 1963 to 1966 and defined “Nashville’s golden age of rhythm & blues.” For fans of the music program, Ironing Board Sam was a “superstar.” In the weeks leading up to a 1988 Night Train reunion, fellow musician Frank Howard described Ironing Board Sam’s Nashville legacy to The Tennessean, stating, “Ironing Board Sam lives in New Orleans, but everybody in this town is crazy about him.”

His performing technique was unusual, and he developed an eccentric persona in several directions. He invented a "button keyboard", which had a regular keyboard arrangement underneath which were fitted guitar strings. Rudimentary electronics gave him a three-pronged sound, which he used primarily when billed as the "Eighth Wonder of the World" while performing as a duo with the drummer Kerry Brown. In 1978, his intention to perform in a hot air balloon was cancelled because of adverse weather. At the New Orleans Jazz & Heritage Festival a year later he played in a 1,500-gallon tank filled with water. By 1982, when he had moved back to New Orleans, he had developed the idea of performing as a "human jukebox", playing only when people inserted coins into his jukebox-styled costume. He worked in the Latin Quarter and got some club work after an appearance on the television program Real People. In the late 1980s he was accompanied by a toy monkey, known as Little George, that was rigged to play in synchronization with a drum machine. His more recent live sets have featured a mix of blues and jazz.

In 1990, Ironing Board Sam toured Europe. His debut album, Human Touch, was released in 1996.

He joined the Music Maker Relief Foundation in 2010 and moved to Chapel Hill, North Carolina. He was provided with new musical equipment, recorded a new album and played at the New Orleans Jazz & Heritage Festival in April 2012.

In late 2012 and 2013, Ironing Board Sam played a series of concerts across North Carolina. He performed at the Steel City Blues Festival in March 2014. He returned to the New Orleans Jazz & Heritage Festival in April 2014.

In 2015, Ironing Board Sam starred in a series of advertisements for Faultless Starch. In July 2015, Ironing Board Sam was on the same bill as Boo Hanks and Lightnin' Wells at a concert in the Sarah P. Duke Gardens, Duke University, Durham, North Carolina.

== Discography ==
Apart from some live recordings, Sam's discography includes the following:

Year	Title	Record label	Notes
1996	Human Touch	Orleans Records	
2011	Going Up	Music Maker	
2012	Ninth Wonder of the World of Music	Music Maker	Recorded in Gary, Indiana, in the early 1970s
2013	Double Bang	Music Maker	
2014	Ironing Board Sam and the Sticks	Music Maker	
2015	Super Spirit	Music Maker	

== See also ==
- List of electric blues musicians
