= John Dee Holeman =

American Piedmont blues guitarist, singer and songwriter (1929–2021)

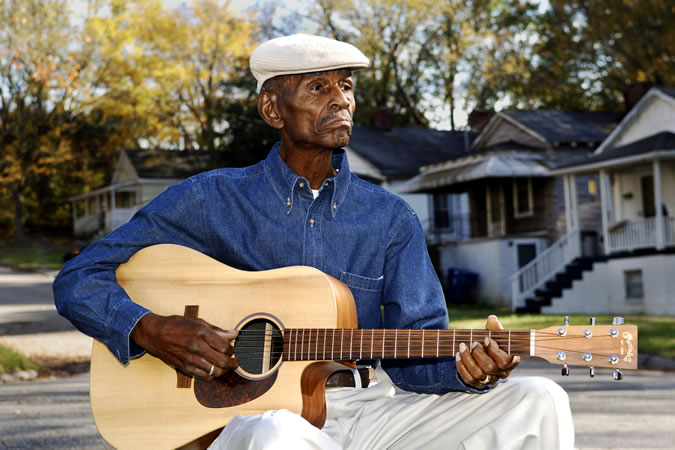
- Holeman in 1988

Background information
- Born: April 4, 1929; Hillsborough, North Carolina, U.S.
- Died: April 30, 2021 (aged 92) Roxboro, North Carolina, U.S.
- Genres: Piedmont blues
- Occupations: Musician, singer, songwriter
- Instruments: Guitar, vocals
- Years active: 1950s–2021
- Labels: Music Maker, Inedit Music

John Dee Holeman (April 4, 1929 – April 30, 2021) was an American Piedmont blues guitarist, singer, and songwriter. His music includes elements of Texas blues, R&B and African-American string-band music. In his younger days he was also known for his proficiency as a buckdancer.

== Early life ==
Holeman was born in Hillsborough, North Carolina. on April 4, 1929. He was raised on a farm in Orange County. He learned to play the guitar, and listened to traveling bluesmen from other parts of the South, as well as on the radio. Drawing inspiration from Blind Boy Fuller, he began singing and playing guitar at local parties and other community events by the time he was in his mid-teens. He went on to purchase his first electric guitar during his mid-twenties. Holeman relocated to Durham, North Carolina, in 1954, where he played with the pianist Fris Holloway. The duo became adept at the Juba dance, also known as the hambone or buckdance, which he had earlier learned at country dances.

== Career ==
During his working lifetime, Holeman had full-time employment as a construction worker, and music was a part-time pursuit. However, he was able to tour in the United States and overseas in the 1980s, including performances at Carnegie Hall, and abroad on behalf of the United States Information Agency's Arts America program. He played at the 42nd National Folk Festival at Wolf Trap, Virginia, in 1980. He performed yearly at the Black Banjo Festival, in Boone, North Carolina. His first album, Bull City After Dark, was nominated for a W. C. Handy award (a predecessor of the Blues Music Awards). He recorded the album Bull Durham Blues in 1988, which featured Taj Mahal. It was re-released on the Music Maker label in 1999. Also in 1988, the National Endowment for the Arts presented Holeman with a National Heritage Fellowship.

Holeman was presented with the North Carolina Folk Heritage Award in 1994. A song Holeman wrote, "Chapel Hill Boogie", was featured on the 2007 Grammy Award–nominated album 10 Days Out: Blues from the Backroads, recorded by Kenny Wayne Shepherd.

In 2007, Music Maker issued the album John Dee Holeman & the Waifs Band, on which Holeman was backed by the Waifs, an Australian folk-rock group. He played several shows in 2018 with Cajun/Zydeco musician Mel Melton in Durham.

== Personal life ==
Holeman was married to Joan until his death. He died on April 30, 2021, at the age of 92.

== Discography ==
Year	Title	Record label
1991	Bull City After Dark	Silver Spring
1992	Piedmont Blues of Carolina	Inedit Music
1993	John Dee & Fris – Country Girl	Mapleshade
1999	Bull Durham Blues	Music Maker
2004	John Dee Holeman with Taj Mahal	Music Maker
2006	Sunnyland Slim, John Dee Holeman – Blues Legends Live	Mapleshade
2007	John Dee Holeman & the Waifs Band	Music Maker
2009	You Got to Lose You Can't Win All the Time	Music Maker
2019	Last Pair of Shoes	Music Maker

== See also ==
- List of Piedmont blues musicians
