= Frank Edwards (blues musician) =

American blues musician

Frank Edwards (March 20, 1909 – March 22, 2002) was an American blues guitarist, harmonica player and singer. He was variously billed as Mr. Frank, Black Frank and Mr. Cleanhead.

== Biography and career ==
Edwards was born in Washington, Georgia, United States.

He recorded for four record labels in his career; Okeh Records in 1940, Regal Records in 1949, and Trix Records in the mid-1970s. Some more recent sessions were done for the Music Maker Relief Foundation. His most noted recordings were "Three Women Blues" and "Terraplane Blues".

Frank Edwards died of a heart attack in Greenville, South Carolina, while being driven back to his Atlanta, Georgia home, after completing his final recordings at the age of 93.
