= Cora Mae Bryant =

American singer

- Born: Cora Mae Weaver; May 1, 1926; Oxford, Newton County, Georgia, United States
- Died: October 30, 2008 (aged 82) Oxford, Newton County, Georgia, United States
- Genres: Blues
- Occupations: Singer, songwriter
- Instruments: Vocals, guitar
- Years active: 1960s–2008
- Label: Music Maker

Cora Mae Bryant (May 1, 1926 – October 30, 2008) was an American blues musician. She was the daughter of another American blues musician, Curley Weaver. Bryant released two solo albums in her lifetime on the Music Maker label.

Part of her home in Oxford, Georgia, was thought of as a 'blues museum'. Her own music largely derived from the influence of attending impromptu performances and house parties, including her father, plus Blind Willie McTell, Buddy Moss, and other local blues musicians of the early 1930s.

== Biography ==
She was born Cora Mae Weaver in Oxford, Newton County, Georgia, United States. She was the daughter of Curley Weaver, and started singing at the age of six in the New Bethel Baptist Church in Walnut Grove, Georgia. With her father often absent performing and recording, Bryant was part-raised by her grandmother, Savannah Shepard, who lived in Almon, Georgia. Bryant often spent days and nights with her grandmother, who had both a piano and guitar, and often played them and sang to entertain the young girl. Bryant maintained that was where her father had earlier obtained his own basic musical intuition. She once said, "When the weekend came, Daddy would come and get me. We did not know the difference between night and day."

She started attending fish fries and barbecues around her home state with her father, and through these connections got to meet Buddy Moss, Blind Willie McTell and others, including the unrecorded guitarist Johnny Guthrie. They played generally outside for the entertainment of locals and Bryant obtained her education in Georgia blues. She later found casual employment in her mid-twenties, with her father picking cotton for a living. Curley Weaver died in 1962.

Bryant began to perform in her own right, although one researcher wryly noted that "Clyde Langford and Cora Mae Bryant, kin to Lightnin' Hopkins and Curley Weaver respectively, but very distant from them in talent". Her own songwriting was slow to get started, but Bryant found the process easy to accomplish. She stated "I don't get no pencil and write 'em. One song, we was sittin' up there just talkin', me and my granddaughter, and I said, "Yeah, if you got anything in layaway, you better get it out." And I made a song of that". Also, Bryant's knowledge of early blues in Atlanta and Georgia, was used as a source by the music historians Peter B. Lowry and Bruce Bastin. Her own recording career was late in commencing before Dave Peabody's 1997 album, Down in Carolina, contained a guest appearance from Bryant on her penned track, "McTell, Moss, & Weaver".

She gradually became important on the Atlanta blues scene; performing, organizing "Giving It Back" festivals at the city's Northside Tavern to honor early blues artists, and as a frequent caller to local blues radio shows. In addition, her collection of memorabilia continued to expand; "... a little pale gray bench, that she said Blind Willie McTell used to sit on to play" was donated to Bryant's 'museum' housed in a side room in her home in Oxford. Bryant was the subject of articles in both Living Blues magazine in February 1998 and in Music Makers in 2002.

In 2001, Bryant recorded her debut album, Born with the Blues, which was released on the supportive Music Maker label. In July 2002, Bryant appeared at the Mississippi Valley Blues Festival, accompanied by the guitarist Josh Jacobson, performing songs from Born with the Blues. Her song "You Was Born to Die" had previously appeared on the compilation album, fRoots 7 (1996), while "It Was Weaver" appeared on Soul Bag N°192 (2008). Further tracks were included on Music Maker's own compilation, Sisters of the South (2003). Her own second label, Born in Newton County, came out the same year.

In 2005, Bryant was living at home in Oxford when suffered a stroke. She died of natural causes on the morning of October 30, 2008, at the age of 82.

== Legacy ==
Bryant's track, "Born to Die" was played by Cerys Matthews on the UK's BBC Radio 2 in April 2015. "It Was Weaver" had been aired in June 2014, on a NTS Radio show hosted by Charlie Bones.

== Discography ==
Year	Title	Record label
2001	Born with the Blues	Music Maker
2003	Born in Newton County	Music Maker
