= Sarah P. Duke Gardens =

Garden in Durham, North Carolina

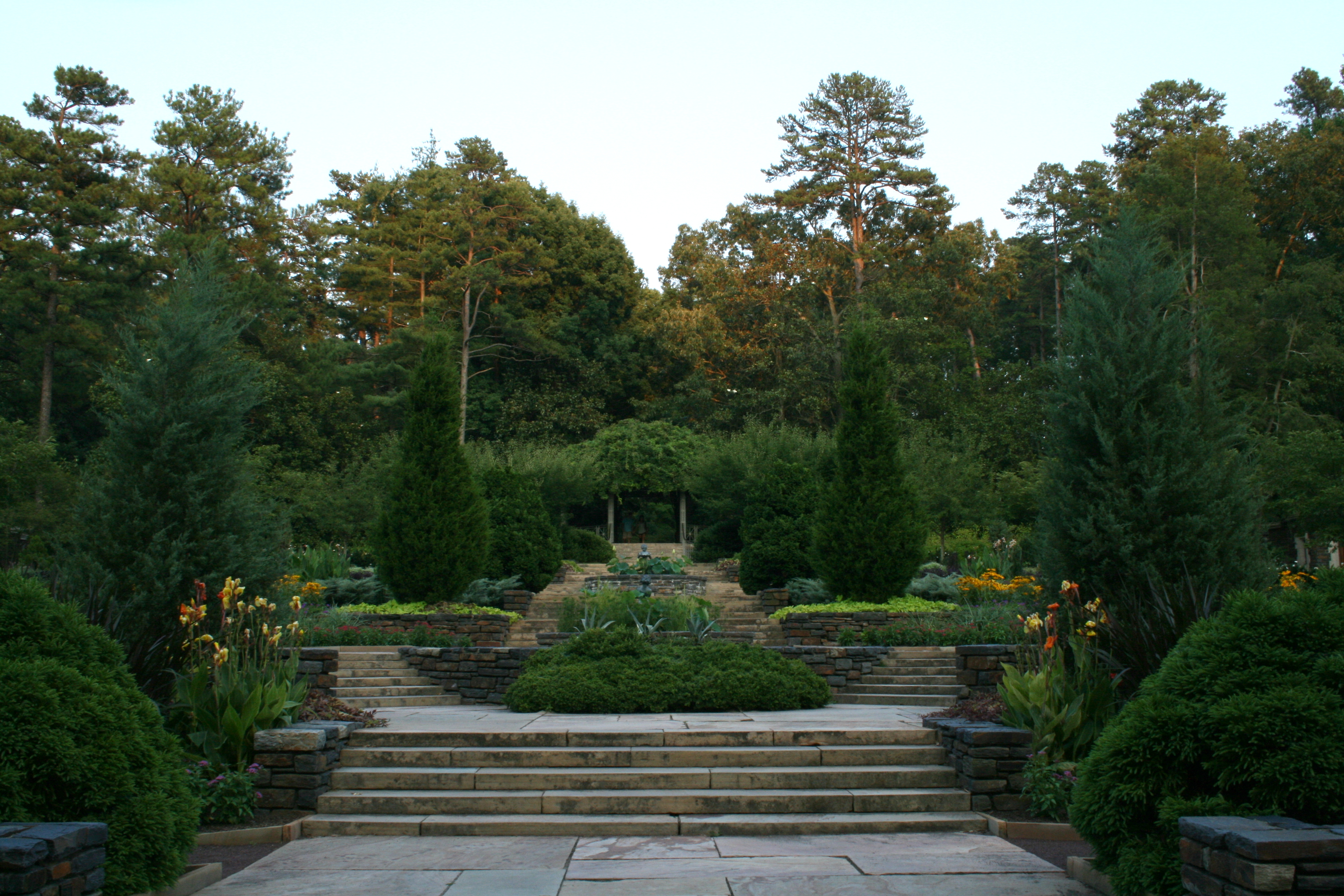
- Interactive map of Sarah P. Duke Gardens
- Type: Historic public garden
- Location: West Campus, Duke University
- Coordinates: 36°0′6.49″N 78°56′0.54″W
- Area: 55 acres (22 ha)
- Designer: Ellen Biddle Shipman
- Etymology: Named for Sarah Pearson Angier Duke
- Website: gardens.duke.edu

The Sarah P. Duke Gardens consist of approximately 55 acres (22 ha) of landscaped and wooded areas at Duke University located in Durham, North Carolina. There are 5 miles (8 km) of allées, walks, and pathways throughout the gardens. The gardens are divided into four areas, the Historic Core and Terraces, the H.L Blomquist Garden of Native Plants, the William Louis Culberson Asiatic Arboretum and the Doris Duke Center Gardens (including the Page-Rollins White Garden). The gardens are a memorial to Sarah Pearson Angier Duke, mother of Mary Duke Biddle and wife of Benjamin N. Duke, one of Duke University's benefactors.

== History ==
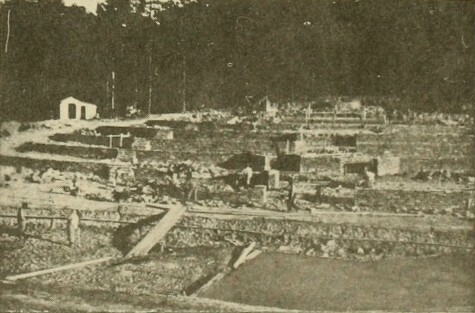
Historical image of construction of the gardens.

In the early 1920s, Duke University's planners intended to turn the area where the Sarah P. Duke Gardens are currently located into a lake. Funds for this project ran short and the idea was subsequently abandoned. The gardens then officially began in 1934, when Dr. Frederic Moir Hanes, a faculty member at the Duke Medical School, persuaded Sarah P. Duke to give $20,000 to finance the planting of flowers in the debris-filled ravine.

By 1935, over 100 flower beds consisting of 40,000 irises, 25,000 daffodils, 10,000 small bulbs and assorted annuals graced the lawns. Unfortunately, the heavy rains of that summer and the flooding stream completely washed away the original gardens. By the time Sarah. P. Duke died in 1936, the gardens were completely destroyed. Dr. Hanes was able to convince Sarah P. Duke's daughter, Mary Duke Biddle, to finance a new garden on higher ground as a memorial to her mother.

Ellen Biddle Shipman, a pioneer in American landscape design, was chosen to create the new garden, known as the Terraces, in the Italianate style. They are considered by many to be her greatest work. Though most of the approximately 650 other gardens Shipman designed have long since disappeared, Sarah P. Duke Gardens has been serving the Duke and Durham communities for more than 80 years. A subsequent 10-year landscaping program to reduce flooding was undertaken starting in 1979, for which the Gardens won an ASLA award in 1990.

The 36th line of latitude goes directly through the Duke Gardens; there is a plaque designating a spot through which the parallel runs.

== Gallery ==
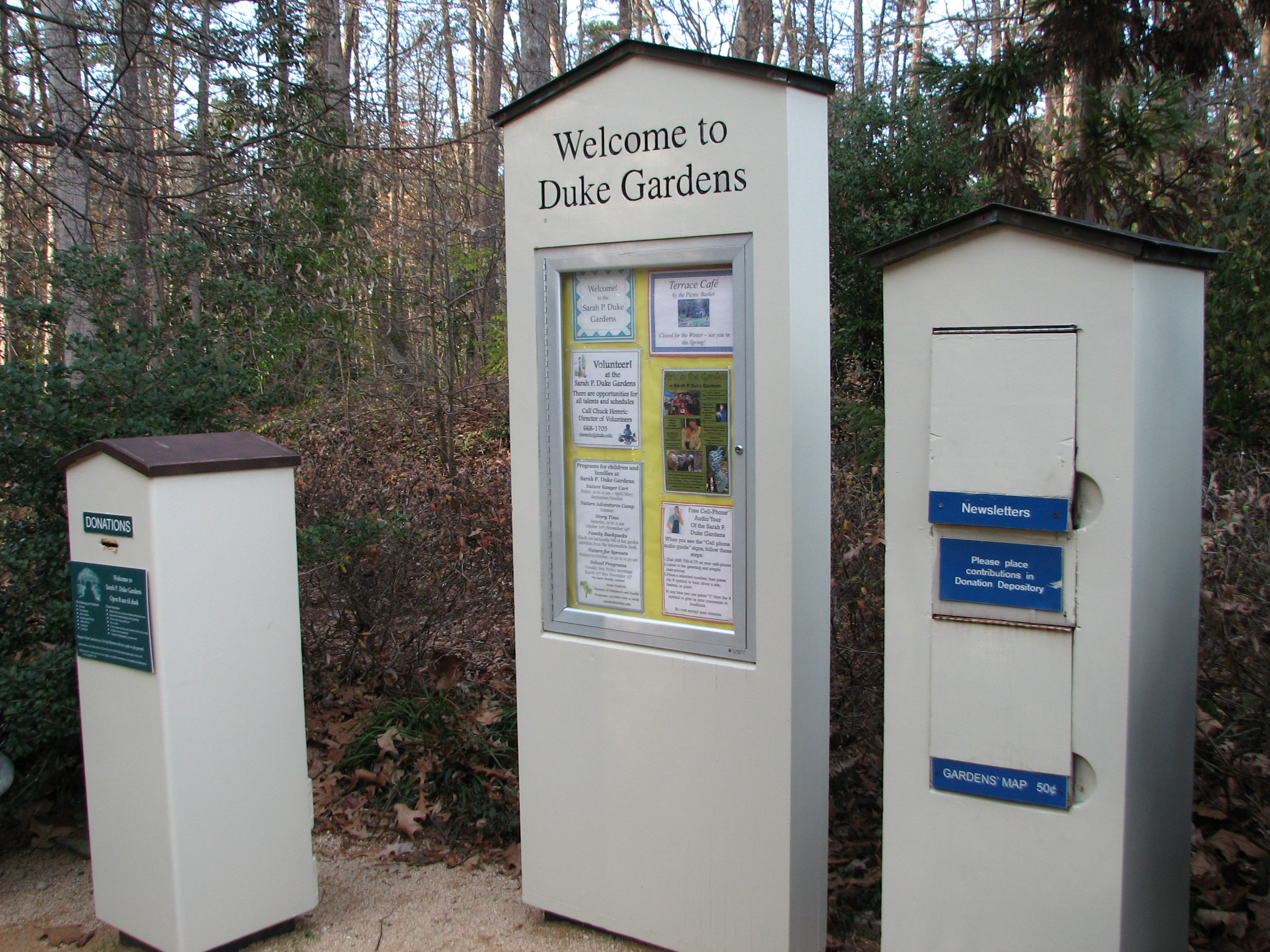
Entrance

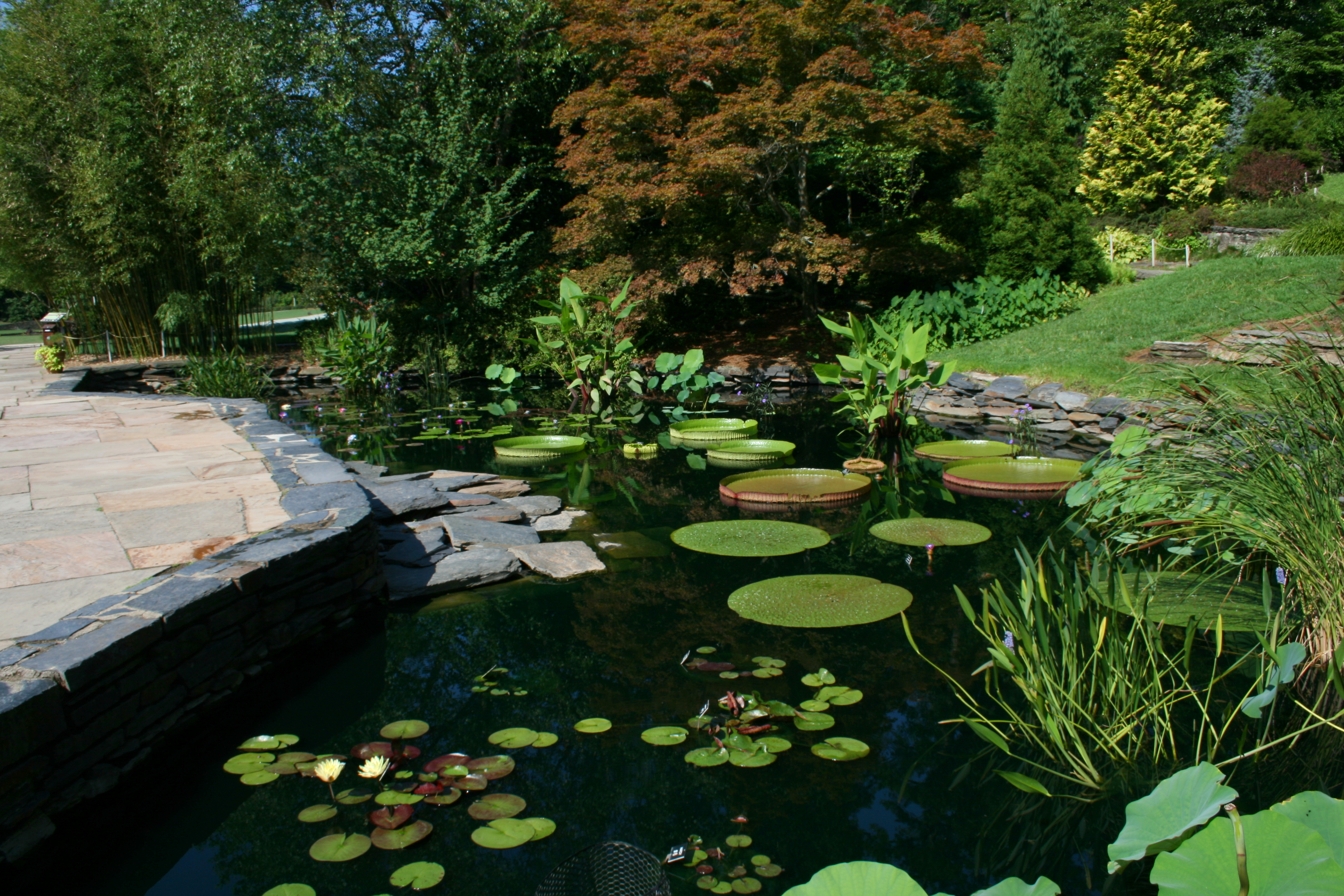
Lily pond

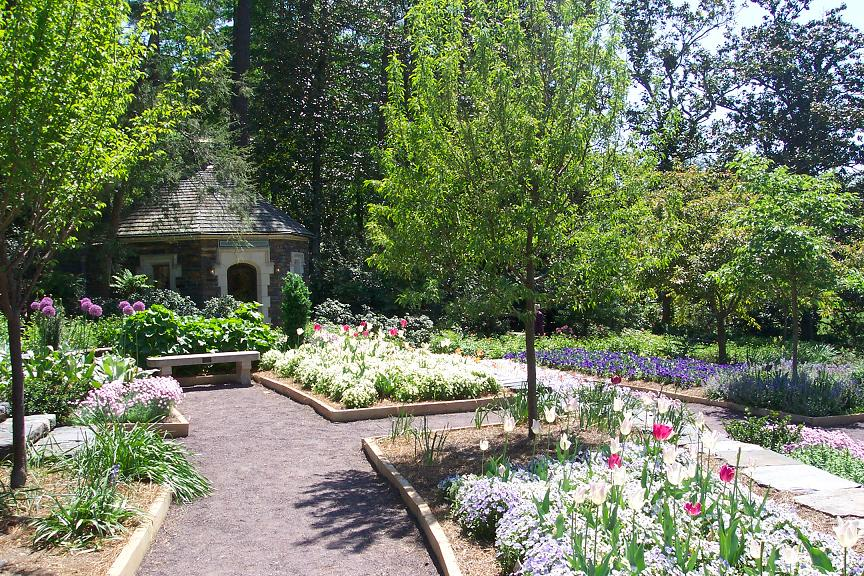
One of the walking paths

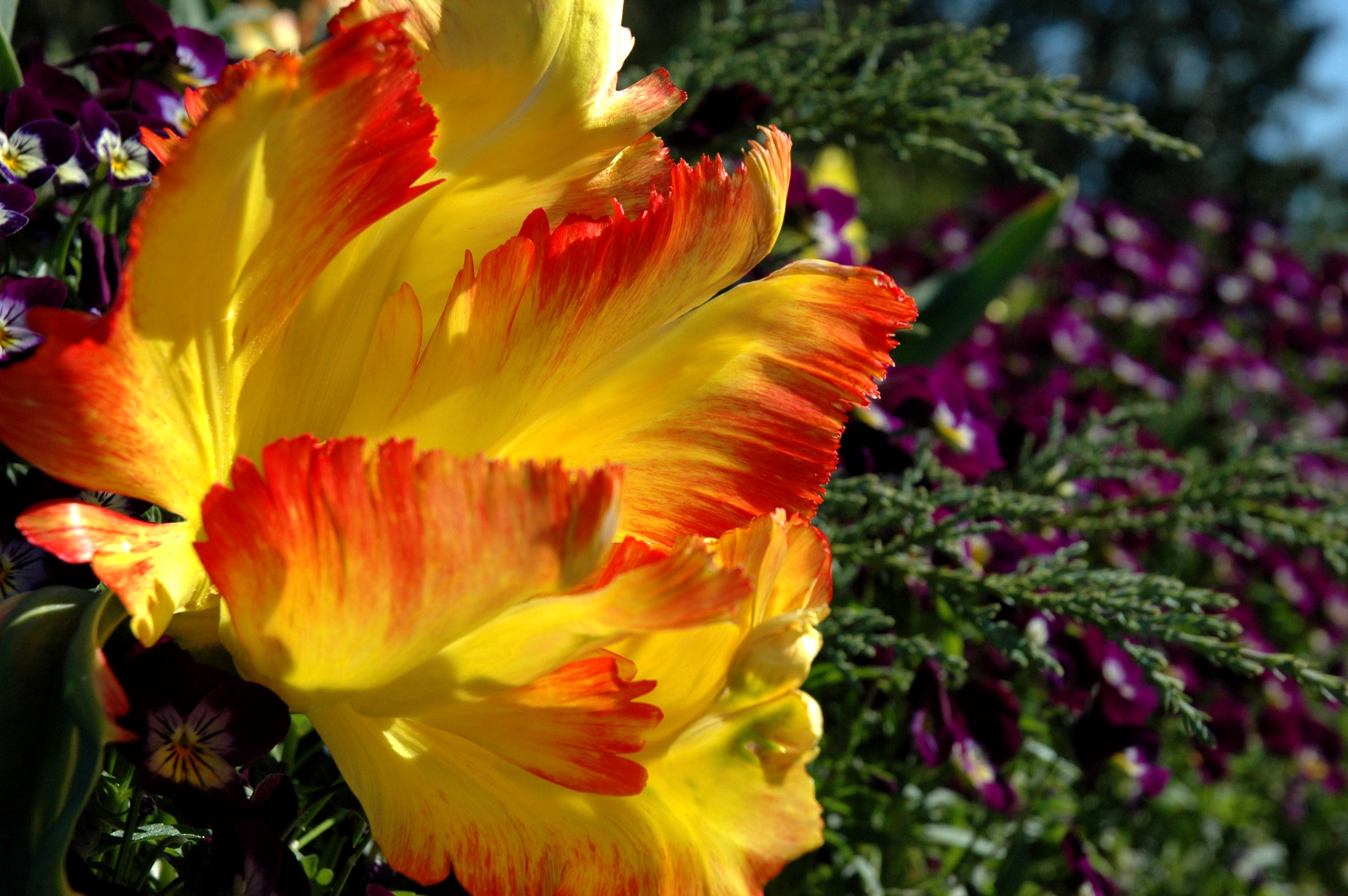
Close-up of flowers

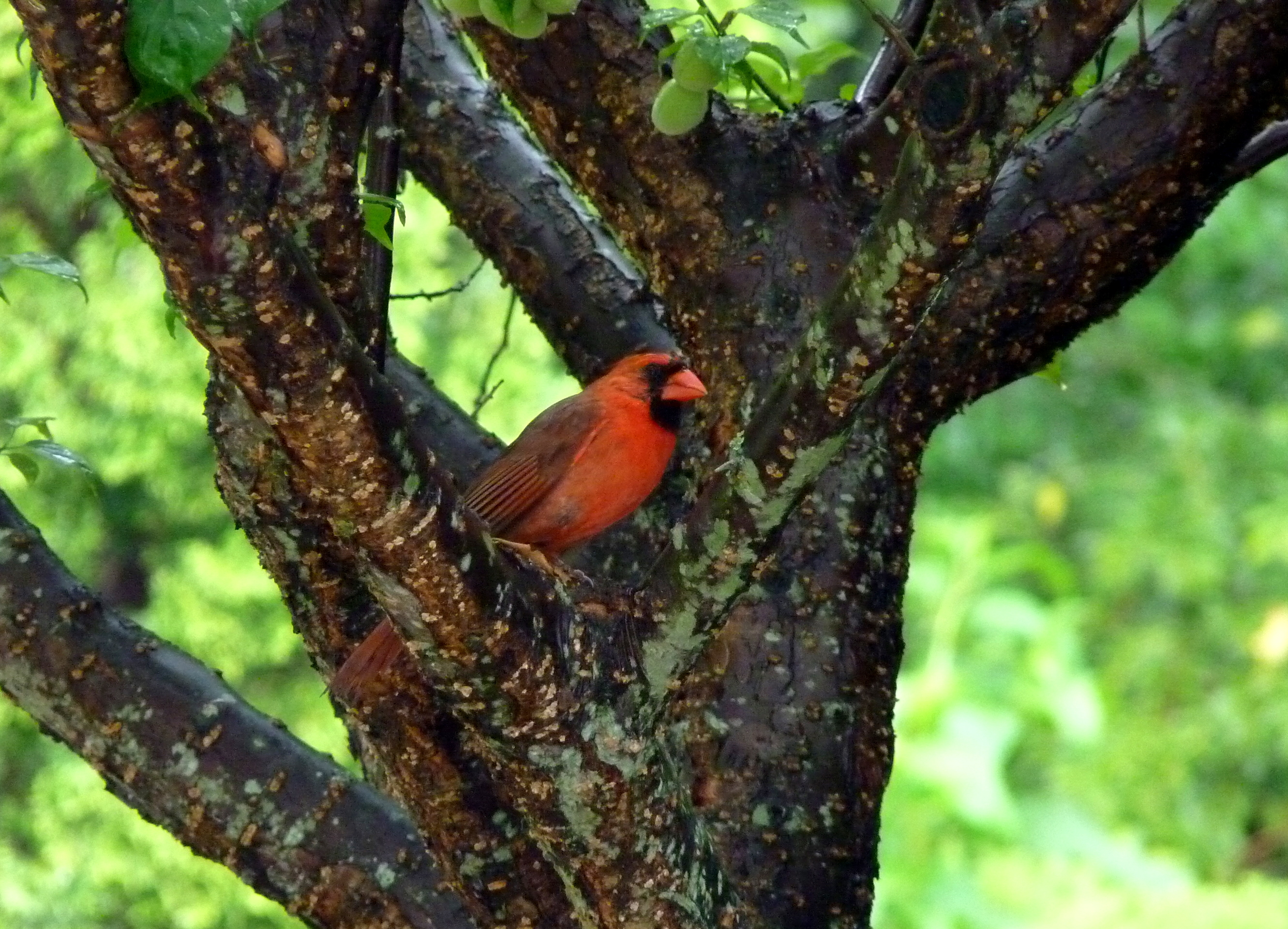
Northern cardinal

== See also ==
- List of botanical gardens in the United States
- List of botanical gardens in the United Kingdom
