= Guitar Gabriel =

American singer-songwriter

- Also known as: Nyles Jones
- Born: Robert Lewis Jones; October 12, 1925; Decatur, Georgia, US
- Died: April 2, 1996 (aged 70) Winston-Salem, North Carolina, US
- Genres: Blues, Piedmont blues, Chicago blues, Texas blues, Gospel
- Occupations: Guitarist, singer, songwriter
- Instruments: Guitar, vocals
- Years active: 1935–1996
- Labels: Gemini, Music Maker
- Website: Musicmaker.org

Robert Lewis Jones (October 12, 1925 – April 2, 1996), known as both Guitar Gabriel and Nyles Jones, was an American blues musician. Gabriel's unique style of guitar playing, which he referred to as "Toot Blues", combined Piedmont, Chicago, and Texas blues, as well as gospel, and was influenced by artists such as Blind Boy Fuller and Reverend Gary Davis. After hearing of Guitar Gabriel from the late Greensboro, North Carolina blues guitarist and pianist, James "Guitar Slim" Stephens, musician and folklorist Tim Duffy located and befriended Gabriel, who was the inspiration for the creation of the Music Maker Relief Foundation. Gabriel wore an emblematic white sheepskin hat, which he acquired while traveling and performing with medicine shows during his late 20s.

== Biography ==
Gabriel was born in Decatur, Georgia, moving to Winston-Salem, North Carolina, at the age of five. His father, Sonny Jones (also known as Jack Jones, James Johnson, and as Razorblade for an act in which he ate razor blades, mason jars, and light bulbs) recorded for Vocalion Records in 1939 in Memphis, accompanied by Sonny Terry and Oh Red (George Washington). Sonny Jones also recorded a single for the Orchid label in Baltimore in 1950 (as Sunny Jones). His family, who grew up sharecropping, shared a talent for music. His great-grandmother, an ex-slave, called set dances and played the banjo; his grandfather played banjo and his grandmother the pump organ; his father and uncle were blues guitarists and singers and his sisters sang blues and gospel.

In 1935, Gabriel's family moved to Durham, North Carolina, where he began playing guitar on the streets. Between the ages of 15 and 25, Gabriel traveled the country playing the guitar in medicine shows. During his travels, he performed with artists such as Bo Diddley, Lightnin' Hopkins, Louis Jordan, Chuck Berry, Muddy Waters, B. B. King, T-Bone Walker and Jimmy Reed. In 1970, Gabriel went to Pittsburgh and recorded a single, "Welfare Blues," as well as an album, My South, My Blues, with the Gemini label under the name "Nyles" Jones. The 45 became a hit in Pittsburgh and Cleveland and though the album sold well, Gabriel never saw any royalties. Disillusioned and embittered by the music business, Gabriel returned home to Winston-Salem where he continued playing music, but expressly for his community, at churches, homes, clubs, "drink houses", and even at bus stops when children were returning home from school. The album, My South, My Blues was reissued in 1988, on the 'Jambalaya' label (a Flyright subsidiary), as Nyles Jones, the Welfare Blues.

In March 1990, musician and folklorist Tim Duffy began searching for Guitar Gabriel. After being directed to a drink house in Winston-Salem, Duffy met Gabriel's nephew, Hawkeye, who took him to meet Gabriel. Duffy and Gabriel forged a friendship, and began performing under the name Guitar Gabriel & Brothers in the Kitchen, later recording the album, which was released on cassette, Do You Know What it Means to Have a Friend? on their own Karibu label. During this time, Duffy would assist the impoverished Gabriel by providing transportation, paying bills, and providing food for him and his wife, but realized that there were many more musicians like Gabriel who were in need of the same assistance, and who were still capable and willing to record and perform. In 1994, Tim and his wife, Denise Duffy founded the Music Maker Relief Foundation. Through this foundation, Gabriel was able to perform in professional venues, including the Lincoln Center and Carnegie Hall, and made several trips to Europe. Michael Parrish played piano on Deep in the South (1992), Guitar Gabriel: Volume 1 (1995), and at the Lincoln Center and Carnegie Hall concerts.

Gabriel died on April 2, 1996, and is buried with his guitar (per his request to Duffy) at the Evergreen Cemetery in Winston-Salem, North Carolina.

== Discography ==
=== Albums ===
- My South, My Blues, as Nyles Jones (Gemini, 1970) – LP
- The Welfare Blues, (Jambalaya reissue of My South, My Blues, 1988) – LP
- Do You Know What it Means to Have a Friend?, as Guitar Gabriel & Brothers in the Kitchen (Karibu, 1991) – Cassette
- Deep in the South, as Guitar Gabriel (Music Maker, 1992) – CD
- Guitar Gabriel: Volume 1, as Guitar Gabriel (Music Maker, 1995) – CD
- The Blue Box of Blues, as Nyles Jones (Millennia, 2003) – CD
- Guitar Gabriel: The Beginning of the Music Maker Story, as Guitar Gabriel (Dixiefrog Records) – CD/DVD

=== Singles ===
- "The Welfare Blues" / "Your Poodle Dog", as Nyles Jones (Gemini, 1970)
