= Beverly Watkins =

American blues guitarist (1939–2019)

- Also known as: Beverly "Guitar" Watkins
- Born: April 6, 1939; Atlanta, Georgia, U.S.
- Died: October 1, 2019 (aged 80) Atlanta, Georgia, U.S.
- Genres: Blues
- Occupations: Guitarist, singer
- Instrument: Guitar
- Years active: 1959–2019

Beverly "Guitar" Watkins (April 6, 1939 – October 1, 2019) was an American blues guitarist. Sandra Pointer-Jones wrote, "Beverly Watkins is a pyrotechnic guitar maven whose searing, ballistic attacks on the guitar have become allegorical tales within the blues community." George Varga, reviewing her debut CD, observed that Watkins “sings and plays with enough poise and verve to make musicians half her age or younger consider alternative means of employment.”

== Biography ==
Watkins was born in Atlanta, Georgia, in 1939. When she was about 12 years old, her family moved to Commerce, Georgia. She began playing music in school, and, in high school, she played bass for a band called Billy West Stone and the Down Beats. Around the year 1959, she was introduced to Piano Red, who had a daily radio show on WAOK, and she subsequently joined Piano Red and the Meter-tones, who played in a number of towns in the Atlanta area, and then Atlanta clubs such as the Magnolia Ballroom and the Casino, before starting to tour throughout the southeast, primarily at colleges. About the time the group renamed itself Piano Red and the Houserockers, they started touring nationally.

The group had two successful singles: "Dr. Feelgood" and "Right String but the Wrong Yo-Yo". After recording "Dr. Feelgood" the group was known variously as Piano Red & The Interns, Dr. Feelgood & The Interns, and Dr. Feelgood, The Interns, and The Nurse. The group also included Roy Lee Johnson (composer of "Mr. Moonlight", later recorded by The Beatles), and Albert White.

After the breakup of the band in about 1965, Watkins played with Eddie Tigner and the Ink Spots, Joseph Smith and the Fendales, and then with Leroy Redding and the Houserockers until the late 1980s. Subsequently she has been based in Atlanta, a well-known fixture at the Underground Atlanta.

Watkins had a long and continuous musical career, and worked with artists including James Brown, B.B. King, and Ray Charles. However, like many roots musicians, she found it difficult to crack the airwaves, and achieved recognition much later in her career, after the advent of the internet made it possible for musicians not backed by major labels to be heard by a wider audience. She was re-discovered by Music Maker Relief Foundation founder Tim Duffy, who started booking her in package shows, and in 1998, with Koko Taylor and Rory Block, was part of the all-star Women of the Blues "Hot Mamas" tour. Her 1999 CD debut, Back in Business, earned a W. C. Handy Award nomination in 2000.

Watkins was playing internationally (for example, the Main Stage at the Ottawa Blues Fest in 2004) as well as in her hometown Atlanta until temporarily sidelined by surgery in 2005, but recovered. She performed a set at the 2008 Cognac Blues Festival. Watkins died after a heart attack on October 1, 2019, at the age of 80.

== Discography ==
- Back In Business (Music Maker Relief Foundation MMC-009, 1999; Jericho/Sire 91007, 2000)
- The Feelings of Beverly "Guitar" Watkins (Music Maker Relief Foundation MMCD-46, 2004)
- Don't Mess With Miss Watkins (Dixiefrog DFGCD-8633, 2007) compilation of her first two albums, plus video program.
- The Spiritual Expressions of Beverly "Guitar" Watkins (Music Maker Relief Foundation MMCD-108, 2009)
