= Piedmont blues =

American blues guitar style

- Stylistic origins: Blues; ragtime; piano blues
- Cultural origins: 1920s, East Coast of the United States

Other topics
- List of musicians

Piedmont blues (also known as East Coast, or Southeastern blues) refers primarily to a guitar style, which is characterized by a fingerpicking approach in which a regular, alternating thumb bass string rhythmic pattern supports a syncopated melody using the treble strings generally picked with the fore-finger, occasionally others. The result is comparable in sound to ragtime or stride piano styles. Blues researcher Peter B. Lowry coined the term, giving co-credit to fellow folklorist Bruce Bastin. The Piedmont style is differentiated from other styles, particularly the Mississippi Delta blues, by its ragtime-based rhythms.

== Origins ==
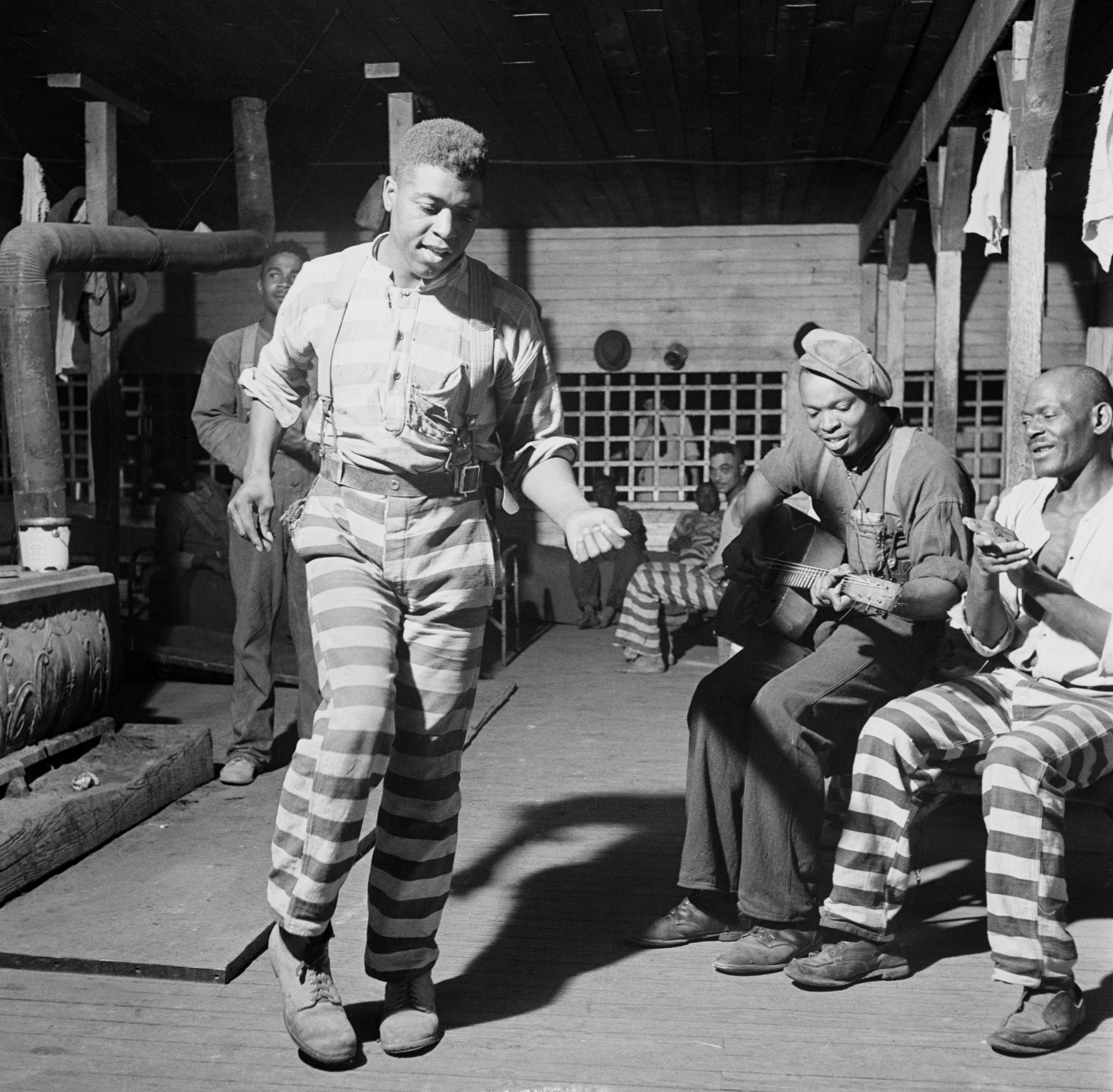
"In the convict camp in Greene County, Georgia", 1941. Buddy Moss is playing guitar; other men unidentified.

The basis of the Piedmont style began with the older "frailing" or "framming" guitar styles that may have been universal throughout the South, and was also based, at least to some extent, on formal "parlor guitar" techniques as well as earlier banjo playing, string band, and ragtime. What was particular to the Piedmont was that a generation of players adapted these older, ragtime-based techniques to blues in a singular and popular fashion, influenced by guitarists such as Blind Blake and Gary Davis.

== Geography ==
The Piedmont blues was named after the Piedmont plateau region, on the East Coast of the United States from about Richmond, Virginia to Atlanta, Georgia. Piedmont blues musicians come from this area, as well as Maryland, Delaware, West Virginia, Pennsylvania and northern Florida, western South Carolina, central North Carolina, eastern Tennessee, Kentucky, and Alabama – later the Northeastern cities such as Boston, Newark, New Jersey, and New York.

Nick Spitzer, Professor of Anthropology and American Studies, folklorist, and producer of American Routes describes Piedmont Blues in this way:

Among the rolling hills, small farms, mills, and coal and railroad camps of the rural East Coast Piedmont, between Tidewater coast and the Appalachian Mountains of Virginia, the Carolinas, and Georgia, black and white economic and cultural patterns have overlapped considerably — more so than in the nearby areas or the Deep South. Piedmont blues styles reflects this, meshing traces of gospel, fiddle tunes, blues, country, and ragtime into its rolling, exuberant sound.

== Recordings ==
Recording artists such as Blind Blake, Josh White, Buddy Moss, and Blind Boy Fuller helped spread the style on the strength of their sales throughout the region. It was nationally popular with the African-American audience for about twenty years from the mid-1920s through to the mid-1940s. Blind Boy Fuller recorded "Step It Up and Go" in 1940.

== Post-World War II ==
As a form of Black American popular music, Piedmont blues fell out of favor on a national basis after World War II. By the late-1950s, it was being performed at US folk music revivals and festivals initially by established Piedmont blues artists such as Josh White, Rev. Gary Davis, and Brownie McGhee and Sonny Terry, as well as Cephas & Wiggins, John Jackson in later years. While musicologists such as George Mitchell, Peter B. Lowry and Tim Duffy collected recordings by the aging community of Piedmont blues players, younger musicians such as Stefan Grossman, Roy Book Binder, Jorma Kaukonen, Paul Geremia, Keb Mo', Michael Roach, Samuel James, Eric Bibb, Ry Cooder, David Bromberg, and Guy Davis have carried on the Piedmont tradition, often having "studied" under some of the old Piedmont masters. The Piedmont fingerpicking style of guitar playing has also influenced other folk and popular musicians such as Doc Watson and Ralph McTell. Arlo Guthrie famously used a Piedmont blues backing for his "Alice's Restaurant" monologues, as it was easy to play repeatedly for long stretches of time.

== Preservation efforts ==
Cultural organizations in North Carolina have supported the preservation of the Piedmont blues. The Greensboro-based Piedmont Blues Preservation Society has partnered with musicians such as Max Drake and a number of public schools in North Carolina to provide performances, exhibitions, and educational programs.

== See also ==
- List of Piedmont blues musicians
