= What Are They Doing in Heaven? =

"What Are They Doing in Heaven Today"

Single by Washington Phillips
- Recorded: Dallas, Texas, December 5, 1928
- Genre: Gospel blues
- Length: 3:15
- Label: Columbia
- Songwriter: Charles Albert Tindley
- Producer: Frank B. Walker

"What Are They Doing in Heaven?" is a Christian hymn written in 1901 by American Methodist minister Charles Albert Tindley. As of 2015, it has become popular enough to have been included in 16 hymnals.

The song has sometimes been recorded under the titles "What Are They Doing?" and "What Are They Doing in Heaven Today?". The question mark is often omitted. The song may also be known by its first line, "I am thinking of friends whom I used to know".

The song consists of four verses and a refrain, each four lines long. In both the verses and the refrain, the first three lines rhyme, and the fourth is "What are they doing now?" or some small variant of that. The author reflects on friends who were burdened in life by care, or by disease, or by poverty, and wonders what they might now be doing in Heaven, without giving his answer.

The first known recording of the song is the 1928 one by Washington Phillips (1880–1954; vocals and zither), in gospel blues style. Phillips' recording was used in the soundtrack of the 2005 film Elizabethtown. The song has since been recorded many times in a wide variety of styles, including gospel and bluegrass; sometimes attributed to Phillips or to "anonymous" or "traditional".

== Recordings ==
- 1928 – Washington Phillips, 78 rpm single Columbia 14404-D
- 1934 – Mitchell's Christian Singers, 78 rpm singles Perfect 326, Banner 33433, Conqueror 8431, and Melotone 13400
- 1938 – Golden Gate Quartet, 78 rpm singles Bluebird 7994 and Montgomery 7866
- c. 1938 – The Southernaires, radio broadcast
- 1946 – Pilgrim Travelers
- 1948 – The Lilly Brothers, 78 rpm single Page 505
- 1948 – The Southern Harmonizers, 78 rpm single Specialty 301
- 1950 – The Mello-Tones, 78 rpm single Columbia 39051
- 1950-53 – Silvertone Singers
- 1952 – The Dixie Hummingbirds, 45rpm single Peacock Records 5-1594
- 1957 – Harry and Jeanie West on the album Favorite Gospel Songs
- 1960 – Sister Rosetta Tharpe on the album Gospels in Rhythm
- 1962 – The Fairfield Four on the album The Bells Are Tolling
- 1964 – The Staple Singers on the album This Little Light
- 1966–92 – Marion Williams
- 1971 – The Downtown Sister New Heaven on the album Gospels And Spirituals
- 1983 – Slim & the Supreme Angels on the album Glory to His Name
- 1992 – Tom Hanway on the album Tom Hanway and Blue Horizon
- 1994 – Martin Simpson on the album A Closer Walk with Thee
- 1995 – The Pfister Sisters on the album The Pfister Sisters
- 1996 – Michelle Lanchester, Bernice Johnson Reagon and Yasmeen on the album Wade in the Water: African American Sacred Music Traditions
- 1996 – Little Jimmy Scott on the album Heaven
- 2000 – Last Forever on the album Trainfare Home
- 2000 – Margaret Allison and the Angelic Gospel Singers on the album Home in the Rock
- 2002 – Jorma Kaukonen on the album Blue Country Heart
- 2003 – Bill Gaither feat. Gloria Gaither and Babbie Mason on the album Heaven
- 2003 – The Immortal Lee County Killers on the album Love Is a Charm of Powerful Trouble
- 2003 – Mike "Sport" Murphy on the album Uncle
- 2006 – Riley Baugus on the album Long Steel Rail
- 2006 – Joanne Blum on the album Even More Love
- 2006 – Cabin Fever NW on the album The Door Is Always Open
- 2006 – Jessy Dixon on the album Get Away Jordan
- 2006 – Vince Gill on the album Voice of the Spirit, Gospel of the South
- 2006 – The Be Good Tanyas on the album Hello Love
- 2006 – Boxcar Preachers on the album Auto-Body Experience
- 2006 – Judy Cook on the album If You Sing Songs ...
- 2006 – The Great Gospel Crew on the album The Greatest Gospel Music
- 2007 – John Reischman and The Jaybirds on the album Stellar Jays
- 2008 – Murry Hammond on the album I Don't Know Where I'm Going but I'm on My Way
- 2009 – Jim Byrnes on the album My Walking Stick
- 2009 – The Habit on the album The Habit
- 2010 – Buddy Greene on the album A Few More Years
- 2011 – The Bright Wings Chorus on the album Here Below
- 2011 – Dead Rock West on the album Bright Morning Stars
- 2013 – The Quiet American on the album Wild Bill Jones
- 2013 – Marcy Marxer on the album Things Are Coming My Way
- 2013 – Mogwai on the album Les Revenants
- 2013 – Mavis Staples on the album One True Vine
- 2013 – Colin Stetson feat. Justin Vernon on the album New History Warfare, Vol. 3: To See More Light
- 2014 – Béla Fleck and Abigail Washburn on the album Béla Fleck and Abigail Washburn
- 2016 – Consuelo's Revenge on the album Mercy
- 2023 – DeYarmond Edison on the album That Was Then: The Bickett Gallery Residency, North Carolina (Live)
