= Chinatown (The Be Good Tanyas album) =

Studio album by the Be Good Tanyas
- Released: March 11, 2003
- Genres: Folk, bluegrass
- Length: 56:30
- Label: Nettwerk
- Producer: John Ellis

The Be Good Tanyas chronology
Blue Horse (2000)	Chinatown (2003)	Hello Love (2006)

Professional ratings
Review scores
Source	Rating
AllMusic	4/5 stars
The Guardian	4/5 stars

Chinatown is the second album by the Be Good Tanyas, released in 2003.

== Track listing ==
1. "It's Not Happening" (Frazey Ford) – 2:41
2. "Waiting Around to Die" (Townes Van Zandt) – 5:13
3. "Junkie Song" (Ford) – 3:47
4. "Ship Out on the Sea" (Ford) – 4:13
5. "Dogsong 2" (Samantha Parton) – 5:08
6. "Rowdy Blues" (Ford, Trish Klein) – 3:32
7. "Reuben" (Traditional; arranged by Jolie Holland, Parton, Ford, Klein) – 4:23
8. "The House of the Rising Sun" (Traditional; arranged by the Be Good Tanyas) – 3:49
9. "In Spite of All the Damage" (Ford) – 3:59
10. "Lonesome Blues" (Parton) – 4:17
11. "In My Time of Dying" (Traditional; arranged by the Be Good Tanyas) – 3:43
12. "I Wish My Baby Was Born" (Traditional; arranged by Samantha Parton) – 3:50
13. "Horses" (The Be Good Tanyas) – 4:01
14. "Midnight Moonlight" (Peter Rowan) – 3:41

== Personnel ==
- Frazey Ford – guitar, mandolin (2), vocals
- Samantha Parton – guitar, mandolin, ukulele, piano (5), vocals
- Trish Klein – electric guitar, banjo, harmonica, acoustic guitar (9), mandolin (12), harmony vocals

Additional personnel

- Andrew Burden – double bass
- Glenn "Ike" Eidsness – drums
- Jolie Holland – fiddle (10), harmony vocals (5, 10)
- Olu Dara – cornet (3, 13)
- Paul Clifford – drums (5)
- Aaron Chapman – saw (5)
- Ketch Secor – fiddle (7)
- Doug Thordarson – five-string viola & violin (5)
- Roey Shemesh – double bass (1), bowed bass (5), fretless bass (4)
- Diane Williams (Frazey's mom) – harmony vocals (14)
- Martin Green – accordion (12)
