= Mitchell's Christian Singers =

- Also known as: New Four Quartet; Mitchell's New Four Singers
- Origin: Kinston, North Carolina, United States
- Genres: Gospel
- Years active: 1934–1940
- Past members: Lewis Herring; William Brown; Julius Davis; Louis David; Sam Bryant

Mitchell's Christian Singers were an American gospel music group who recorded prolifically between 1934 and 1940.

== Musical career ==
Formed in the early 1930s in Kinston, North Carolina, the group initially featured William Brown (lead tenor), Julius Davis (tenor), Louis "Panella" David (baritone) and Lewis Herring (bass), all former farmers. Later, two of them drove trucks, one was a carpenter and one a tobacco-factory hand. Good friends, they gradually drifted into the habit of singing together in the evenings after work.

They were discovered by J. B. Long, a talent scout for the American Record Company who was also responsible for discovering Blind Boy Fuller. Originally known as the "New Four Quartet," they were managed by former singer Willie Mitchell and first recorded in August 1934 as "Mitchell's New Four Singers" under the supervision of producer William Calloway. In 1935, Herring left and was replaced by Sam Bryant. When they recorded again in 1936, they did so under the name of "Mitchell's Christian Singers". They recorded over 80 songs over six years, released on seven different labels owned by the American Record Company. They became more widely known after performing at the From Spirituals to Swing concert presented by John Hammond in Carnegie Hall on 23 December 1938. Their last recordings were in 1940, after which they occasionally performed at community functions in Kinston.

They pioneered a 'primitive' idiosyncratic style of a cappella gospel singing: curiously wailing, syncopated spirituals, with a "down home" quality, featuring with an interplay of voices that anticipated the sound of post-war gospel quartets. Their material was mostly standard quartet fare like "What Are They Are Doing in Heaven?", "Traveling Shoes", "Swing Low Sweet Chariot", etc.

== Discography ==
Label / Catalog #	Date	Title	Matrix #	Ref
Banner 33434	8/21/1934	Here Am I	15678	ME13401
Perfect 327	8/21/1934	Here Am I	15678=2	OR8469
Melotone 13401	8/21/1934	Here I Am	15678	BA33434
Banner 33390	8/21/1934	I'm on My Way	15680	ME13357
Melotone 13357	8/21/1934	I'm on My Way	15680	BA33390
Banner 33195	8/21/1934	Mother Where Was You	15681	ME13162
Melotone 13162	8/21/1934	Mother Where Was You	15681	CQ8457
Conqueror 8457	8/21/1934	Mother, Where Was You?	15681	RO5381
Perfect 297	8/21/1934	Mother, Where Was You?	15681=1	OR8381
Conqueror 8497	8/21/1934	On My Way	15680	-
Perfect 319	8/21/1934	On My Way	15680=2	OR8451
Melotone 5-12-67	8/21/1934	Them Bones	15676	-
Banner 33196	8/21/1934	Traveling Shoes	15679	ME13163
Melotone 13163	8/21/1934	Traveling Shoes	15679	BA33196
Perfect 298	8/21/1934	Traveling Shoes	15679=2	OR8382
Perfect 326	8/21/1934	What Are They Doing in Heaven	15677=1	OR8468
Banner 33433	8/21/1934	What Are They Doing in Heaven?	15677=1	ME13400
Conqueror 8431	8/21/1934	What Are They Doing in Heaven?	15677=1	ME13400
Melotone 13400	8/21/1934	What Are They Doing in Heaven?	15677=1	BA33433
Banner 33283	8/21/1934	When a Man Feels Discouraged	15675=2	ME13250
Conqueror 8414	8/21/1934	When a Man Feels Discouraged	15675=2	ME13250
Melotone 13250	8/21/1934	When a Man Feels Discouraged	15675=2	BA33283
Perfect 305	8/21/1934	When a Man Feels Discouraged	15675=2	OR8409
Banner 33390	8/22/1934	Angels Will Roll the Stone Away	15686	ME13357
Conqueror 8497	8/22/1934	Angels Will Roll the Stone Away	15686	ME13357
Perfect 319	8/22/1934	Angels Will Roll the Stone Away	15686=1	OR8451
Melotone 13357	8/22/1934	Angels Will Roll the Stones Away	15686	CQ8497
Conqueror 8873	8/22/1934	Are You Working on the Building	15688	-
Perfect 298	8/22/1934	Are You Working on the Building	15688=1	OR8382
Banner 33196	8/22/1934	Are You Working on the Building?	15688	ME13163
Melotone 13163	8/22/1934	Are You Working on the Building?	15688	BA33196
Melotone 6-04-64	8/22/1934	Gonna Shout All Over God's Heaven	15684	-
Banner 33434	8/22/1934	Homey Homey	15687	ME13401
Perfect 327	8/22/1934	Homey Homey	15687=2	OR8469
Melotone 13401	8/22/1934	Homey, Homey	15687	BA33434
Banner 33433	8/22/1934	How About You	15689=2	ME13400
Perfect 326	8/22/1934	How About You	15689=2	OR8468
Vocalion 04394	8/22/1934	How About You	15689=2	OR8468
Conqueror 8431	8/22/1934	How About You?	15689=2	ME13400
Melotone 13400	8/22/1934	How About You?	15689=2	CQ8431
Banner 33283	8/22/1934	Lean Your Head Out the Window	15683=1	ME13250
Conqueror 8414	8/22/1934	Lean Your Head Out the Window	15683=1	ME13250
Melotone 13250	8/22/1934	Lean Your Head Out the Window	15683	CQ8414
Perfect 305	8/22/1934	Lean Your Head Out the Window	15683=1	OR8409
Conqueror 8873	8/22/1934	Somewhere in Heaven	15690	ME51267
Melotone 5-12-67	8/22/1934	Somewhere in Heaven	15690	CQ8873
Melotone 6-04-64	8/22/1934	Swing Low Sweet Chariot	15682	-
Banner 33195	8/22/1934	They Scandalized My Name	15685	ME13162
Conqueror 8457	8/22/1934	They Scandalized My Name	15685	ME13162
Melotone 13162	8/22/1934	They Scandalized My Name	15685	BA33195
Perfect 297	8/22/1934	They Scandalized My Name	15685=1	OR8381
Conqueror 8872	4/28/1936	Count Out the Angels	19154=1	ME70572
Columbia 30073	4/28/1936	Got My Ticket	19132=1	CO37696
Columbia 37696	4/28/1936	Got My Ticket	19132=1	30073
Melotone 7-03-62	4/28/1936	Got My Ticket	19132=1	VO3099z
Conqueror 8927	4/28/1936	Lord, I Can't Turn Back	19151=1	ME60962
Melotone 6-09-62	4/28/1936	Lord, I Can't Turn Back	19151	CQ8927
Conqueror 8927	4/28/1936	New Dry Bones	19133=1	ME60962
Melotone 6-09-62	4/28/1936	New Dry Bones	19133	CQ8927
Melotone 7-01-71	4/28/1936	Repair Me	19148	-
Columbia 30072	4/28/1936	Standing by the Bedside	19129=1	CO37695
Melotone 6-12-53	4/28/1936	Standing by the Bedside	19129=1	CQ8769
Conqueror 8769	4/28/1936	Standing by the Riverside	19129=1	ME61253
Columbia 30072	4/28/1936	What Kind of Shoes Do the Angels Wear	19146=1	CO37695
Columbia 37695	4/28/1936	What Kind of Shoes Do the Angels Wear	19146=1	30072
Conqueror 8769	4/28/1936	What Kind of Shoes Do the Angels Wear	19146=1	ME61253
Melotone 6-12-53	4/28/1936	What Kind of Shoes Do the Angels Wear	19146=1	CQ8769
Columbia 37694	4/28/1936	What More Can Jesus Do	19147=1	30071
Conqueror 9416	4/28/1936	What More Can Jesus Do	19147=1	ME60758
Melotone 6-07-58	4/28/1936	What More Can Jesus Do	19147=1	CQ9416
Conqueror 9416	4/28/1936	Who Was John?	19152	ME60758
Melotone 6-12-54	4/28/1936	You Rise Up	19149=2	-
Melotone 7-01-71	4/28/1936	You See the Sign of Judgement	19150	-
Conqueror 8872	4/29/1936	Come on Ezekial Let's Go 'Round the Wall	19153=1	ME70572
Melotone 7-05-72	4/29/1936	Come on Ezekiel, Let's Go 'Round the Hall	19153=1	CQ8872
Melotone 7-05-72	4/29/1936	Count Out the Angels	19154=2	CQ8872
Vocalion 03016	4/29/1936	Count Out the Angels	19154=2	CQ8872
Melotone 6-12-54	4/29/1936	Go Ye Prodigal Son	19155	-
Vocalion 03024	4/29/1936	Lord, I Can't Turn Back	19151	ME60962
Columbia 30073	4/29/1936	Out on the Ocean Sailing	19156=1	CO37696
Columbia 37696	4/29/1936	Out on the Ocean Sailing	19156=1	30073
Melotone 7-03-62	4/29/1936	Out on the Ocean Sailing	19156=1	VO3099z
Vocalion 03074	4/29/1936	What Kinda Shoes Do the Angels Wear?	19146=1	-
Columbia 30071	4/29/1936	What More Can Jesus Do	19147=1	CO37694
Columbia 30071	4/29/1936	Who Was John	19152=1	CO37694
Columbia 37694	4/29/1936	Who Was John	19152=1	30071
Melotone 6-07-58	4/29/1936	Who Was John	19152=1	CQ9416
Vocalion 03015	4/29/1936	Who Was John	19152=1	ME60758
Melotone 8-01-67	8/10/1937	Hide Me Oh Lord	21483	VO3279z
Conqueror 8929	8/10/1937	I Swore to the Lord	21486=1	-
Melotone 8-01-67	8/10/1937	I Swore to the Lord	21486	VO3279z
Vocalion 03279	8/10/1937	I Swore to the Lord	21486	ME80167
Vocalion 04055	8/10/1937	I Want Somebody to Tell Me	21482	-
Columbia 30091	8/10/1937	I'm Praying Humble	21485=2	CO37789
Columbia 37789	8/10/1937	I'm Praying Humble	21485=2	30091
Conqueror 8928	8/10/1937	I'm Praying Humble	21485=2	ME71159
Melotone 7-11-59	8/10/1937	I'm Praying Humble	21485=2	CQ8928
Columbia 30092	8/10/1937	Jesus Christ of Nazareth	21489=1	CO37790
Columbia 37790	8/10/1937	Jesus Christ of Nazareth	21489=1	30092
Conqueror 8929	8/10/1937	Jesus Christ of Nazareth	21489=1	ME71259
Conqueror 8945	8/10/1937	Jesus Christ of Nazareth	21489=1	VO3235z
Melotone 7-12-59	8/10/1937	Jesus Christ of Nazareth	21489	CQ8929
Columbia 30074	8/10/1937	Walkin' With My Savior	21488=2	CO37697
Conqueror 9001	8/10/1937	Walkin' With My Savior	21488=2	ME80355
Columbia 37697	8/10/1937	Walkin' With My Saviour	21488=2	CO30074
Melotone 8-03-55	8/10/1937	Walking With My Savior	21488=2	CQ9001
Vocalion 03318	8/10/1937	Walking With My Savior	21488=2	-
Columbia 37697	8/10/1937	We Want to Have a Talk With Jesus	21487=2	30074
Conqueror 9001	8/10/1937	We Want to Have a Talk With Jesus	21487=2	ME80355
Melotone 8-03-55	8/10/1937	We Want to Have a Talk With Jesus	21487=2	CQ9001
Vocalion 04055	8/10/1937	Yes My Lord I Done Done	21490	-
Vocalion 04176	8/10/1937	You Got to Make a Change	21484	-
Columbia 30092	8/11/1937	Blessed Are the Poor in Spirit	21499=1	CO37790
Columbia 37790	8/11/1937	Blessed Are the Poor in Spirit	21499=1	30092
Conqueror 8945	8/11/1937	Blessed Are the Poor in Spirit	21499=1	VO3235z
Melotone 7-12-59	8/11/1937	Blessed Are the Poor in Spirit	21499	-
Vocalion 03235	8/11/1937	Blessed Are the Poor in Spirit	21499	CQ8945
Columbia 30091	8/11/1937	I Don't Care Where You Bury My Body	21501=2	CO37789
Columbia 37789	8/11/1937	I Don't Care Where You Bury My Body	21501=2	30091
Conqueror 8928	8/11/1937	I Don't Care Where You Bury My Body	21501=2	-
Melotone 7-11-59	8/11/1937	I Don't Care Where You Bury My Body	21501=2	-
Vocalion 03180	8/11/1937	I Don't Care Where You Bury My Body	21502=2	-
Conqueror 9029	8/11/1937	I Got to Go to Judgement	21502=1	-
Melotone 8-04-57	8/11/1937	I Got to Go to Judgement	21502=1	-
Conqueror 9080	8/11/1937	My Lord I'm Trampin'	21503	-
Vocalion 04122	8/11/1937	My Lord I'm Tramping	21503=2	-
Columbia 30075	8/11/1937	My Lord, I'm Trampin'	21503=2	CO37698
Columbia 37698	8/11/1937	My Lord, I'm Trampin'	21503=2	30075
Conqueror 9029	8/11/1937	My Mother Had to Kneel Down	21498=1	-
Melotone 8-04-57	8/11/1937	My Mother Had to Kneel Down	21498	-
Vocalion 03409	8/11/1937	My Mother Had to Kneel Down	21498	-
Columbia 30075	8/11/1937	My Time Ain't Long	21500=1	CO37698
Columbia 37698	8/11/1937	My Time Ain't Long	21500=1	30075
Conqueror 9080	8/11/1937	My Time Ain't Long	21500	-
Vocalion 04122	8/11/1937	My Time Ain't Long	21500=1	-
Columbia 30074	8/11/1937	We Want to Have a Talk With Jesus	21487=2	CO37697
Vocalion 04913	7/6/1938	Jesus Hear Me Praying	23193	-
Columbia 30076	7/6/1938	My Mother's Gone to Glory	23192=1	CO37699
Columbia 37699	7/6/1938	My Mother's Gone to Glory	23192=1	30076
Conqueror 9081	7/6/1938	My Mother's Gone to Glory	23192=1	-
Vocalion 04273	7/6/1938	My Mother's Gone to Glory	23192	-
Conqueror 9159	7/6/1938	While He's Passing By	23194	-
Vocalion 04472	7/6/1938	While He's Passing By	23194	-
Conqueror 9159	7/7/1938	Brother Come on In	23205=1	-
Vocalion 04472	7/7/1938	Brother Come on In	23205=1	-
Vocalion 04844	7/7/1938	Drinkin' of the Holy Wine	23200	-
Columbia 30094	7/7/1938	I Got a Letter From Jesus	23197=1	CO37792
Columbia 37792	7/7/1938	I Got a Letter From Jesus	23197=1	30094
Conqueror 9417	7/7/1938	I Heard the Preachin' of the Elders	23202=1	-
Conqueror 9359	7/7/1938	I Need to Be More Like Jesus	23206	-
Vocalion 05097	7/7/1938	I Need to Be More Like Jesus	23206	CQ9359
Columbia 30093	7/7/1938	Jesus Goin' to Make Up My Dying Bed	23203=1	CO37791
Vocalion 04357	7/7/1938	Jesus Goin' to Make Up My Dying Bed	23203	-
Columbia 37791	7/7/1938	Jesus Gonna' Make Up My Mind	23203=1	30093
Columbia 37699	7/7/1938	Judgement Is Comin'	23204=1	30076
Columbia 30076	7/7/1938	Judgement Is Coming	23204=1	CO37699
Conqueror 9081	7/7/1938	Judgement Is Coming	23204=1	-
Columbia 30094	7/7/1938	Lord Have Mercy	23195=1	CO37792
Vocalion 04418	7/7/1938	Lord Have Mercy	23195	-
Columbia 37791	7/7/1938	Saints Are Marching	23196=1	30093
Columbia 30093	7/7/1938	The Saints Are Marching	23196=1	CO37791
Conqueror 9417	7/7/1938	Up on the Mountain	23198=1	-
Vocalion 04593	7/7/1938	Up on the Mountain	23198=1	CQ9417
Conqueror 9274	12/27/1938	Ain't Gonna Lay My Receiver Down	23876=1	-
Vocalion 04844	12/27/1938	Are You Living Humble	23880	-
Conqueror 9360	12/27/1938	Are You Living Humble?	23880	-
Vocalion 04783	12/27/1938	I Ain't Gonna Lay My Receiver Down	23876=1	-
Conqueror 9360	12/27/1938	I'm Gonna Do What My Lord Said	23875	-
Vocalion 04964	12/27/1938	I'm Gonna Do What My Lord Says	23875	-
Vocalion 04720	12/27/1938	My Poor Mother Died A-Shouting	23879	-
Conqueror 9285	12/27/1938	My Poor Mother Dies A-Shouting	23879=1	-
Conqueror 9285	12/27/1938	Rock My Soul in the Bosom of Abraham	23878=1	-
Conqueror 9359	12/27/1938	Way Down in Egypt Land	23881	-
Vocalion 05097	12/27/1938	Way Down in Egyptland	23881	CQ9359
Conqueror 9274	12/27/1938	Won't I Be Glad When I Get to Heaven	23877=1	-
Columbia 37483	8/6/1940	Bridegroom's Coming	WC3216	30050
Columbia 30046	8/6/1940	Don't You Want That Stone?	WC3232=A	CO37479
Columbia 37479	8/6/1940	Don't You Want That Stone?	WC3232	30046
Okeh 06081	8/6/1940	Don't You Want That Stone?	WC3232	Co37479
Columbia 30045	8/6/1940	Famine in the Land	WC3229=A	CO37478
Columbia 30045	8/6/1940	Go Where I Send Thee	WC3231=A	CO37478
Columbia 30048	8/6/1940	I Want Jesus to Be Around	WC3215=A	CO37481
Columbia 37481	8/6/1940	I Want Jesus to Be Around	WC3215	30048
Okeh 05948	8/6/1940	I Want Jesus to Be Around	WC3215	-
Columbia 30047	8/6/1940	Lead Me On	WC3218=A	CO37480
Conqueror 9770	8/6/1940	Lead Me On	C3218	-
Okeh 05995	8/6/1940	Lead Me On	WC3218	CQ9770
Columbia 30048	8/6/1940	Lead Me to That Rock	WC3214=A	CO37481
Columbia 37481	8/6/1940	Lead Me to That Rock	WC3214	30048
Okeh 05948	8/6/1940	Lead Me to That Rock	WC3214	-
Columbia 37480	8/6/1940	Lead On	WC3218	30047
Columbia 30046	8/6/1940	Take My Hand	WC3217=A	CO37479
Columbia 37479	8/6/1940	Take My Hand	WC3217	30046
Conqueror 9770	8/6/1940	Take My Hand	C3217	-
Okeh 06081	8/6/1940	Take My Hand	WC3217	-
Columbia 30050	8/6/1940	The Bridegroom's Coming	WC3216=A	CO37483
Okeh 05786	8/6/1940	The Bridegroom's Coming	WC3216	-
Columbia 30050	8/6/1940	Walk With Me	WC3230=A	CO37483
Columbia 30049	8/7/1940	Don't Drive Them Away	WC3227=A	CO37482
Columbia 37482	8/7/1940	Don't Drive Them Away	WC3227	30049
Okeh 05835	8/7/1940	Don't Drive Them Away	WC3227	-
Columbia 37478	8/7/1940	Famine in the Land	WC3229	30045
Conqueror 9769	8/7/1940	Famine in the Land	C3229	-
Okeh 06117	8/7/1940	Famine in the Land	WC3229	Co30045
Columbia 37478	8/7/1940	Go Where I Send Thee	WC3231	30045
Conqueror 9769	8/7/1940	Go Where I Send Thee	C3231	-
Okeh 06117	8/7/1940	Go Where I Send Thee	WC3231	Co37478
Columbia 30047	8/7/1940	Jesus Is Everything to Me	WC3228=A	CO37480
Columbia 37480	8/7/1940	Jesus Is Everything to Me	WC3228	30047
Okeh 05995	8/7/1940	Jesus Is Everything to Me	WC3228	-
Columbia 30049	8/7/1940	Kneel Down and Pray	WC3237=A	CO37482
Columbia 37482	8/7/1940	Kneel Down and Pray	WC3237	30049
Okeh 05835	8/7/1940	Kneel Down and Pray	WC3237	-
Columbia 37483	8/7/1940	Walk With Me	WC3230	30050

== Other sources ==
- Time, January 2, 1939
- Sleeve notes
