= The Living and the Dead (Jolie Holland album) =

Studio album by Jolie Holland
- Released: October 7, 2008
- Recorded: 2008
- Genres: Alternative country, folk
- Length: 39:49
- Label: Anti-
- Producers: Jolie Holland, Shahzad Ismaily

Jolie Holland chronology
| Springtime Can Kill You (2006) | The Living and the Dead (2008) | Wine Dark Sea (2014) |

Professional ratings
Aggregate scores
| Source | Rating |
|---|---|
| Metacritic | 71/100 |
Review scores
| Source | Rating |
| AllMusic | 4/5 stars |
| The Boston Globe | (favorable) |
| ChartAttack | 4/5 stars |
| Cleveland Free Times | (favorable) |
| Hartford Courant | (favorable) |
| Now | 3/5 stars |
| Paste | (75%) |
| Pitchfork | (7.8/10) |
| Tiny Mix Tapes | 3.5/5 stars |
| The Washington Post | (favorable) |

The Living and the Dead is Jolie Holland's fourth studio album. It was released on October 7, 2008, through Anti-. The album was mixed and engineered by Joel Hamilton.

== Track listing ==
1. "Mexico City"
2. "Corrido Por Buddy"
3. "Palmyra"
4. "You Painted Yourself In"
5. "Fox in its Hole"
6. "Your Big Hands"
7. "Sweet Loving Man"
8. "Love Henry"
9. "The Future"
10. "Enjoy Yourself"

== Personnel ==
- Jolie Holland – vocals, guitar, drum, fiddle, clapping, whistling, producer
- M Ward – guitar, bass, producer
- Shahzad Ismaily – bass, percussion, electric guitar, moog, shruthi box, robots, duck call, producer
- Marc Ribot – guitar
- Samantha Parton – harmonies
- Garth Steel Klippert – trumpet
- Colin Stetson – cornet
- Marc Alan Goodman – clapping
- Marika Hughes – cello
- Kenny Wolleson – drums
- Joel Hamilton – guitar
- Rachel Blumberg – drums
- Jim White – drums
- Samantha Parton – vocals
- Jenni Quilter – dishes
