= Hello Love =

Hello Love may refer to:

- Hello Love (The Be Good Tanyas album)
- Hello Love (Chris Tomlin album)
- "Hello Love" (song), a 1974 single by Hank Snow

== See also ==
- Hello, Love (Ella Fitzgerald album)
- Hello, Love (Jean Stafford album)
