= Blue Horse (album) =

Studio album by the Be Good Tanyas
- Released: 2000
- Genre: Folk
- Length: 53:53
- Label: Nettwerk
- Producer: Garth Futcher

The Be Good Tanyas chronology
Blue Horse (2000)	Chinatown (2003)

Blue Horse is the debut album by the Be Good Tanyas. It was released in 2000 in Canada, and in 2001 in the U.S.

== Production ==
The album was produced by Garth Futcher, and was recorded in a Vancouver-area wooden shack.

== Critical reception ==
Professional ratings
Review scores
Source	Rating
AllMusic	4/5 stars
The Encyclopedia of Popular Music	4/5 stars

Exclaim! deemed the album "spooky, drowsy gothic folk performed by three western women with voices like junkie angels." The Independent wrote: "A low-key album made on an impossibly low budget, Blue Horse is one of the most beguiling debuts to be heard this year."

== Track listing ==
No.	Title	Writer(s)	Length
1.	"The Littlest Birds"	Samantha Parton, Jolie Holland	4:06
2.	"Broken Telephone"	Frazey Ford	4:52
3.	"Rain and Snow"	Traditional	3:59
4.	"The Lakes of Pontchartrain"	Traditional; arranged by Jolie Holland	4:39
5.	"Only in the Past"	Frazey Ford, Samantha Parton	4:56
6.	"The Coo Coo Bird"	Traditional	4:50
7.	"Dogsong aka Sleep Dog Lullaby"	Samantha Parton	4:46
8.	"Momsong"	Frazey Ford	5:33
9.	"Don't You Fall"	Samantha Parton	3:38
10.	"Up Against the Wall"	Frazey Ford	3:19
11.	"Oh! Susanna"	Stephen Foster	4:17
12.	"Light Enough to Travel"	Geoff Berner	4:58
Total length:			53:53
