= Melotone =

Melotone may refer to:

- Melotone (organ), an electrostatic tone generator incorporated into Compton cinema organs in the 1930s, or the 1952 Compton Electrone model that revived the Melotone name
- Melotone Records, an American record label
