= Catalpa (album) =

Studio album by Jolie Holland
- Released: November 11, 2003
- Recorded: 2002
- Genre: Country, folk
- Length: 50:05
- Label: Anti-
- Producer: Jolie Holland

Jolie Holland chronology
Jolie Holland and The Quiet Orkestra	Catalpa (2003)	Escondida (2004)

Professional ratings
Review scores
Source	Rating
AllMusic	4/5 stars

Catalpa is Jolie Holland's debut album from 2003. The tracks were recorded in the living room of one of the band members with the intention of distributing the recordings among their friends. Inevitably, copies of the recordings were passed from person to person and demand increased for a commercial release of the album. Catalpa was initially released on the Anti Records label and distributed through CDbaby.com. In 2003, the San Francisco Chronicle chose Catalpa as one of the 10 best albums of that year.

== Track listing ==
All tracks written by Jolie Holland except where noted.

1. "Alley Flowers" – 5:02
2. "All the Morning Birds" – 4:23
3. "Roll My Blues" (Mike Good) – 4:06
4. "Black Hand Blues" – 2:55
5. "December, 1999" – 3:36
6. "I Wanna Die" – 5:19
7. "Demon Lover Improv" – 4:32
8. "Catalpa Waltz" – 5:08
9. "The Littlest Birds" (Syd Barrett, Holland, Samantha Parton) – 3:59
10. "Wandering Angus" (Holland, Miller Brian, William B. Yeats) – 7:22
11. "Periphery Waltz" – 4:06
12. "Ghost Waltz" – 3:50

== Personnel ==
- Jolie Holland – vocals, guitar, drum
- David Mihaly – drum, bells
- Enzo Garcia – harmonica, muted banjo
- Chris Arnold – musical saw, percussion
- Samantha Parton – harmonies
- Brian Miller – electric guitar
