= From Spirituals to Swing =

Concerts in Carnegie Hall in 1938 and 1939

From Spirituals to Swing was the title of two concerts presented by John Hammond in Carnegie Hall on 23 December 1938 and 24 December 1939. The concerts included performances by Count Basie, Benny Goodman, Big Joe Turner and Pete Johnson, Helen Humes, Meade Lux Lewis, Albert Ammons, Mitchell's Christian Singers, the Golden Gate Quartet, James P. Johnson, Big Bill Broonzy and Sonny Terry.

== Concert ==
The idea was a history, starting with spirituals and leading up to big swing bands, involving African American performers. Hammond had difficulty gaining sponsorship for the event because it involved African American artists and an integrated audience. However, The New Masses, the journal of the American Communist Party, agreed to finance it.

Hammond, according to the liner notes of the boxed set, "[i]n 1938... conceived a concert at Carnegie Hall in New York City to showcase African-American music from its raw beginnings to the most current jazz. Hammond... was one of the most influential talent scouts and record producers in history, having 'discovered' artists from Billie Holiday and Count Basie to [much later - Varlet] Bob Dylan and Bruce Springsteen. The concert, which would be titled 'From Spirituals To Swing', would depict the common themes that existed in Black music from its origins in Africa, through gospel and blues, dixieland and eventually to swing."

"On December 23, 1938, 'From Spirituals To Swing' was presented to a sold-out house... Its success prompted another concert on Christmas Eve of 1939..."

"The musical significance of the two 'From Spirituals To Swing' concerts is difficult to deny. Equally important, however, were the social and political implications. The racial impact cannot be overlooked as African-American artists were being presented to an integrated audience at Carnegie Hall at a time when such an occurrence was, if not unheard of, extremely rare. The strong ties between the jazz world and the political Left were also obvious in the two sponsors of the programs: The Marxist 'New Masses' and the Theater Arts Committee which was an openly Left-wing organization. John Hammond was an independent iconoclast. In his efforts to foster social justice and integration he found himself at times in step with civil rights groups and Communists (though Hammond himself was never a member of the Communist Party). The impact of the integration of musicians and jazz audiences in the 1930s and 1940s was very influential on the racial history of our country. 'From Spirituals To Swing' was not only a musical milestone in the history of jazz, it was also a socially significant even coming at a time when our nation, as well as the world, was entering a period of inconceivable upheaval and change."

The boogie-woogie craze of the late 1930s and early 1940s dates from these concerts. Johnson and Turner, along with Lewis and Ammons, continued as an act after the concerts with their appearances at the Cafe Society night club, as did many of the other performers. The stage moves and musical ecstasy of the gospel performers were new to the white audience, and presaged much that appeared later in rhythm and blues and rock and roll.

== List of performers ==
=== December 23, 1938 ===
- The Count Basie Orchestra

Ed Lewis, Harry Edison, Buck Clayton, Shad Collins (trumpets); Dicky Wells, Dan Minor, Benny Morton (trombones); Earle Warren (alto sax); Herschel Evans, Lester Young (tenor sax, clarinet); Jack Washington (baritone sax, alto sax); Count Basie (piano); Freddie Green (guitar); Walter Page (bass); Jo Jones (drums)

- Oran "Hot Lips" Page with the Count Basie Orchestra
- Meade Lux Lewis
- Albert Ammons
- Pete Johnson
- Joe Turner with Pete Johnson
- Sister Rosetta Tharpe with Albert Ammons
- Mitchell's Christian Singers

William Brown (1st tenor), Julius Davis (2nd tenor), Louis David (baritone), Sam Bryant (bass)

- Big Bill Broonzy with Albert Ammons
- Sonny Terry
- James P. Johnson
- Jimmy Rushing with the Count Basie Orchestra
- The Kansas City Six:

Buck Clayton, Lester Young, Leonard Ware (electric guitar), Freddie Green, Walter Page, Jo Jones

- The Golden Gate Quartet

Willie Johnson (1st bass), Henry Owens (1st tenor), William Langford (2nd tenor), Orlandus Wilson (2nd bass)

=== December 24, 1939 ===
- The Benny Goodman Sextet

Benny Goodman (clarinet), Charlie Christian (electric guitar), Lionel Hampton (vibes), Fletcher Henderson (piano), Arthur Bernstein (bass), Nick Fatool (drums)

- James P. Johnson
- Ida Cox with Shad Collins, Dicky Wells, Buddy Tate (tenor sax), James P. Johnson, Freddie Green, Walter Page, Jo Jones
- Big Bill Broonzy with Albert Ammons
- Sonny Terry with Bull City Red
- The Kansas City Six:

Buck Clayton, Lester Young, Charlie Christian, Freddie Green, Walter Page, Jo Jones

- Helen Humes with James P. Johnson and the Count Basie Orchestra

Ed Lewis, Harry Edison, Buck Clayton, Shad Collins, Dicky Wells, Dan Minor, Benny Morton, Earle Warren, Lester Young, Buddy Tate, Jack Washington, Count Basie, Freddie Green, Walter Page, Jo Jones

== Recordings ==
The recordings of the concerts commissioned by Hammond were acetate sound checks, and only transferred to tape in 1953 and released in 1959, with faked announcements recorded by Hammond the previous year. The album was reissued by Vanguard Records as a triple CD set in 1999. Inside were two documents: a modern brochure describing the contents of the box set, and a reproduction of the original 1938 program for the show. The program was entitled: "The New Masses Presents An Evening Of African American Negro Music - 'From Spirituals To Swing' [Dedicated to Bessie Smith]." The cover had an image of Bessie Smith.

== Bibliography ==
- From Spirituals To Swing, CD boxed set booklet, copyright 1999 by Vanguard Records, A Welk Music Group Company, 2700 Pennsylvania Avenue, Santa Monica, California, 90404
