= Hello Love (The Be Good Tanyas album) =

Studio album by The Be Good Tanyas
- Released: October 10, 2006
- Genre: Folk, bluegrass
- Length: US: 50:18 / UK: 58:49
- Label: Nettwerk
- Producer: The Be Good Tanyas

The Be Good Tanyas chronology
Chinatown (2003)	Hello Love (2006)

Professional ratings
Review scores
Source	Rating
AllMusic	3.5/5 stars
The Guardian	4/5 stars
Slant Magazine	3/5 stars

Hello Love is the third album by The Be Good Tanyas, released in 2006. Two tracks on the CD include guest musicians Old Crow Medicine Show.

== Track listing ==
No.	Title	Writer(s)	Length
1.	"Human Thing"	Frazey Ford	4:11
2.	"For the Turnstiles"	Neil Young	4:27
3.	"A Thousand Tiny Pieces"	Sean Hayes	3:45
4.	"Ootischenia"	Frazey Ford; Samantha Parton; Trish Klein	3:20
5.	"A Little Blues" (with Old Crow Medicine Show)	Samantha Parton	2:42
6.	"Scattered Leaves"	Jeremy Lindsey	4:46
7.	"Hello Love"	Ford	4:22
8.	"Nobody Cares for Me"	John Hurt	3:59
9.	"Out of the Wilderness"	Traditional	3:13
10.	"Song for R."	Samantha Parton	4:16
11.	"What Are They Doing in Heaven Today"	Traditional	4:28
12.	"Crow Waltz" (with Old Crow Medicine Show)	Samantha Parton	2:47
13.	"When Doves Cry" (Hidden track)	Prince	4:02
Total length:			50:18

UK Special limited Edition
No.	Title	Writer(s)	Length
1.	"Human Thing"	Frazey Ford	4:11
2.	"For the Turnstiles"	Neil Young	4:27
3.	"A Thousand Tiny Pieces"	Sean Hayes	3:45
4.	"Ootischenia"	Frazey Ford; Samantha Parton; Trish Klein	3:20
5.	"A Little Blues" (with Old Crow Medicine Show)	Samantha Parton	2:42
6.	"Scattered Leaves"	Jeremy Lindsey	4:46
7.	"Hello Love"	Ford	4:22
8.	"Nobody Cares for Me"	John Hurt	3:59
9.	"Out of the Wilderness"	Traditional	3:13
10.	"Song for R."	Samantha Parton	4:16
11.	"What Are They Doing in Heaven Today"	Traditional	4:28
12.	"Crow Waltz" (with Old Crow Medicine Show)	Samantha Parton	2:47
13.	"When Doves Cry" (Hidden track)	Prince	4:02
14.	"Back, Back Train"	Fred McDowell	4:09
15.	"Birds"	Neil Young	4:22
Total length:			58:49
