= Golden Gate Quartet =

American gospel vocal group

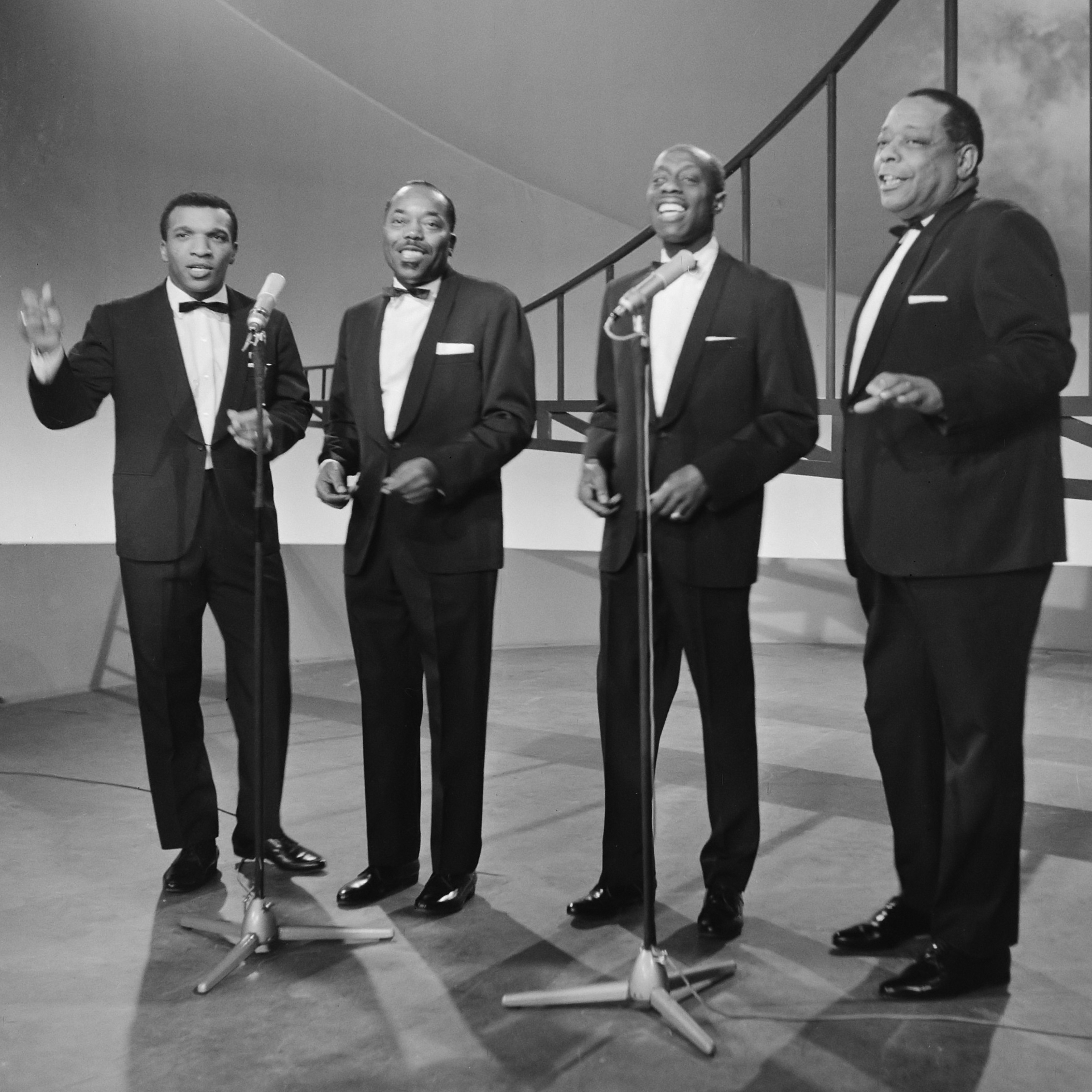
- The Golden Gate Quartet (1964)

Background information
- Also known as: Golden Gate Jubilee Quartet
- Origin: Norfolk, Virginia, United States
- Genres: Spirituals, Gospel
- Years active: 1934–present
- Members: Paul Brembly; Frank Davis; Thierry François; Timothy Riley
- Past members: Willie Johnson; Henry Owens; Robert Ford; A. C. Griffin; William Langford; Orlandus Wilson; Clyde Riddick; Cliff Givens; Alton Bradley; Orville Brooks; Eugene Mumford; Franck Todd; Caleb Ginyard; Calvin Williams; Clyde Wright; Richard Phillips; Charles Alexander West; Anthony L. Gordon

The Golden Gate Quartet (a.k.a. The Golden Gate Jubilee Quartet) is an American vocal group. It was formed in 1934 and, with changes in membership, remains active.

== Origins and early career ==
The group was founded as the Golden Gate Jubilee Singers in 1934, by four students at Booker T. Washington High School in Norfolk, Virginia. According to the group's website, the original members were Willie Johnson (baritone; d. 1980), William Langford (tenor; d. 1970), Henry Owens (second tenor; d. 1970) and Orlandus Wilson (bass; 1917–1998); other sources state that Langford and Wilson replaced earlier members Robert "Peg" Ford and A.C. "Eddie" Griffin in 1935.

From 1935, the group sang in churches and on local radio, gaining a regular spot on radio station WIS in Columbia, South Carolina in 1936. They began as a traditional jubilee quartet, combining the clever arrangements associated with barbershop quartets with rhythms borrowed from the blues and jazz like scat singing. They developed a broad repertoire of styles – from Owens' mournful, understated approach in songs such as "Anyhow" or "Hush, Somebody's Calling My Name", to the group's highly syncopated arrangements in "Shadrach, Meshach and Abednego". Like The Mills Brothers in popular music, they would often include vocal special effects in their songs, imitating train sounds in songs such as "Golden Gate Gospel Train". Langford often sang lead, using his ability to range from baritone to falsetto, while Johnson narrated in a hip syncopated style that became the hallmark for the group. Wilson's bass served as the anchor for the group and Owens harmonized with Langford and Johnson.

In 1937, they moved to station WBT in Charlotte, North Carolina, and soon afterwards won a contract with Bluebird Records. After their first recording session on August 14, 1937, in which they recorded 14 songs in two hours, they were contracted to record 12 tracks per year. In 1938, they were recruited by John Hammond to appear at the first From Spirituals To Swing concert held at Carnegie Hall in New York City, after which their popularity grew. An example of their output during this popular period includes a 1938 recording of 'John the Revelator' being inducted into the National Recording Registry in 2005. They stayed in New York and were signed up for a residency at the Cafe Society nightclub. As well as performing and recording gospel songs they also recorded some secular songs for RCA Records, who were intending to bill them as "The Four Chocolate Bars", but the recordings were not released. In 1939, William Langford left the group to form a new group, the Southern Sons; he was replaced by Clyde Riddick (1913–1999).

== The 1940s and 1950s ==
In 1940, the group signed a new contract with Columbia Records' subsidiary Okeh label, and shortened their name to the Golden Gate Quartet. They soon had a nationwide radio program and the opportunity to sing at Franklin Delano Roosevelt's inauguration in 1941, becoming the first black musical group to sing at Constitution Hall and later performing several times at the White House. They continued to be popular during World War Two, making several appearances in Hollywood films and singing secular music, including some unique popular front songs such as "Stalin Wasn't Stallin'" that mixed humor with political commentary. The Quartet appeared in films such as Star Spangled Rhythm (1942), Hit Parade of 1943 (1943), Hollywood Canteen (1944), and the Danny Kaye film A Song Is Born (1948). In the latter film, they performed the songs "Joshua Fit the Battle of Jericho" and part of "A Song Is Born" with Louis Armstrong and Virginia Mayo.

Johnson was called into the US Navy in 1943, followed by Wilson in 1944; they were temporarily replaced by Cliff Givens – who later left to join firstly The Ink Spots and then Billy Ward and His Dominoes – and Alton Bradley. The group moved first to the main Columbia record label and then, in 1948, to Mercury Records. Johnson left in 1948 to join The Jubalaires, and was replaced by Orville Brooks (1919–1997).

The quartet lost their pre-eminent position in gospel music after the war, when they faced competition from the newer hard gospel quartets. They continued in their old style, offering sharper political commentary in songs such as "God's Gonna Cut You Down", but losing much of their audience to quartets such as the Dixie Hummingbirds and the Soul Stirrers. Henry Owens left in 1950 to become a preacher and solo artist. Alton Bradley returned to replace him, but then left in 1952 when he was replaced by Eugene Mumford (1925–1977), previously of The Larks.

The Golden Gates revived their career in 1955, however, when they toured Europe for the first time, where they became widely popular. The group moved to Paris in 1959 and has continued touring, primarily in Europe, since then. During his stint in the US Army, in Germany, Elvis Presley, who was a huge admirer of their work since his early childhood, visited them backstage at Le Casino in Paris, and stayed to watch their entire show, staying also with them at the hotel Prince de Galles. Presley recorded a version of their popular "Swing Down Chariot" that appeared on his His Hand in Mine gospel album. During this time, there were further personnel changes: Orville Brooks left and was replaced by Franck Todd and later in turn by Caleb Ginyard (1910–1978), and Eugene Mumford was replaced by Clyde Wright (born May 1, 1928, Charlotte, North Carolina).

Since the 1950s, the group has been primarily based in Europe. They toured widely in the late 1950s, including US State Department-sponsored tours around the world. In 1959, the group started a two-year residency at the Casino de Paris.

== Later activities ==
The group made their first tour of Africa in 1962, and during the early 1960s gradually expanded their accompanying band to incorporate guitar, piano, bass and drums. Through the 1960s they toured widely in Europe, with a long-established line-up of Orlandus Wilson, Clyde Riddick, Caleb Ginyard, and Clyde Wright. In 1971, Ginyard and Wright left, and were replaced by Paul Brembly (the great-nephew of Orlandus Wilson) and Calvin Williams. Wright returned to the group in 1985 to replace Williams, who returned to the US.

Bill "Willie" Johnson worked with Eugene Mumford and Cliff Givens in his own version of The Golden Gate Quartet in the late '70s out of the Los Angeles area, most notably appearing on Ry Cooder's "Jazz" album, and appearing with Cooder in his 1978 "Soundstage" performance, with Givens, Pico Payne, and Jimmy Adams (though Johnson didn't use the group name in these particular appearances).

The group undertook a 60th anniversary world tour in 1994. Riddick remained with the group until his retirement in 1995, and Wilson, the last surviving member of the original group, until his death in 1998. Riddick was replaced by Frank Davis. Wright was replaced by Charles West (Nephew to Wilson) of Portsmouth, VA. The position of bass singer has in recent years been filled by Thierry Fred François, Richard Phillips, and, since 2005, by Anthony Gordon.

== Recognition ==
In his 1978 album Guigui, musician Michel Jonasz used excerpts from their recording of "Joshua Fit the Battle of Jericho" to mix into the song "Golden Gate".

The Golden Gate Quartet was inducted into The Vocal Group Hall of Fame in 1998.

A sample of the group's recording of "Jezebel" would serve as the basis for the Recoil song of the same name, appearing on their 2000 album Liquid.

In his 2011 album So Beautiful or So What, musician Paul Simon used excerpts from their 1938 recording of "Golden Gate Gospel Train" to mix into the song "Love & Blessings". In addition, the group's music was also featured in the video game Battlefield: Bad Company.

== Members after 1934 ==
=== Current members ===
- Paul Brembly (born 1950)
- Terry François (born 1968)
- Timothy Riley
- Frank Davis

=== Past members ===
- Calvin Williams (1921–2010)
- William Langford (1909–1969)
- Henry Owens (died 1970)
- Eugene Mumford (1925–1977)
- J. Caleb Ginyard (1910–1978)
- Willie Johnson (1913–1980)
- Joe Johnson (1914–1984)
- Clifford Givens (1918–1989)
- Orville Brooks (1919–1997)
- Orlandus Wilson (1917–1998)
- Clyde Riddick (1913–1999)
- Clyde Wright (1928–2026)
- Richard Phillips (born 1943)
- Bill Bing (1922–2014)
- Charles West (?)
- Alton Bradley (deceased)
- Frank Todd (1933–2016)
- Anthony L. Gordon (born 1957)

== Discography ==
=== Selected singles ===
- Bluebird 7564: "Pure Religion" / "Remember Me" (both recorded January 24, 1938)
- Okeh 6713: "Comin' in on a Wing and a Prayer" (recorded May 1943) / "Run On" (recorded March 1942)
- Okeh 6741: "I Will Be Home Again" / "The General Jumped at Dawn" (both sides recorded March 16, 1945)
- Columbia 37236: "Atom and Evil" / "Shadrach" (both recorded June 5, 1946)

=== 78RPM singles (1937–1952) ===
Label / Catalog #	Date	Title	Performer	Matrix #	Reference #
Montgomery 8548	August 3, 1937	Born Ten Thousand Years Ago	Golden Gate Jubilee Quartet	11936	BB7205
Montgomery 8544	August 3, 1937	Gabriel Blows His Horn	Golden Gate Jubilee Quartet	11932	BB7126
Bluebird 7278	August 4, 1937	Bedside of a Neighbor	Golden Gate Jubilee Quartet	11933	MW7441
Montgomery 7441	August 4, 1937	Bedside of a Neighbor	Golden Gate Jubilee Quartet	11933	BB7278*
Bluebird 7154	August 4, 1937	Behold the Bridegroom Cometh	Golden Gate Jubilee Quartet	011937=1	MW7440
Montgomery 7440	August 4, 1937	Behold the Bridegroom Cometh	Golden Gate Jubilee Quartet	011937=1	BB7154
Bluebird 7264	August 4, 1937	Bonnet	Golden Gate Jubilee Quartet	011941=1	MW8549
Montgomery 8549	August 4, 1937	Bonnet	Golden Gate Jubilee Quartet	011941=1	BB7264
Bluebird 7205	August 4, 1937	Born Ten Thousand Years Ago	Golden Gate Jubilee Quartet	11936	MW8548
Bluebird 7126	August 4, 1937	Gabriel Blows His Horn	Golden Gate Jubilee Quartet	011932=1	MW8544
Bluebird 7340	August 4, 1937	Go Where I Send Thee	Golden Gate Jubilee Quartet	011938=1	MW8550
Montgomery 8550	August 4, 1937	Go Where I Send Thee	Golden Gate Jubilee Quartet	011938=1	BB7340
RCA 20-2134	August 4, 1937	Go Where I Send Thee	Golden Gate Quartet	-	-
Bluebird 7126	August 4, 1937	Golden Gate Gospel Train	Golden Gate Jubilee Quartet	011931=1	MW7493
Montgomery 7493	August 4, 1937	Golden Gate Gospel Train	Golden Gate Jubilee Quartet	011931=1	BB7126
Bluebird 7278	August 4, 1937	I've Found a Wonderful Savior	Golden Gate Jubilee Quartet	011944=1	MW7441
Montgomery 7441	August 4, 1937	I've Found a Wonderful Savior	Golden Gate Jubilee Quartet	011944=1	BB7278+
RCA 20-2134	August 4, 1937	Job	Golden Gate Quartet	-	-
Victor 27323	August 4, 1937	Job	Golden Gate Quartet	11940	-
Bluebird 7154	August 4, 1937	Jonah	Golden Gate Jubilee Quartet	011934=1	MW7440
Montgomery 7440	August 4, 1937	Jonah	Golden Gate Jubilee Quartet	011934=1	BB7154
RCA 20-2073	August 4, 1937	Jonah	Golden Gate Quartet	-	-
Victor 27322	August 4, 1937	Jonah	Golden Gate Quartet	11934	-
Bluebird 7264	August 4, 1937	Massa's in the Cold, Cold Ground	Golden Gate Jubilee Quartet	011942=1	MW8549
Montgomery 8549	August 4, 1937	Massa's in the Cold, Cold Ground	Golden Gate Jubilee Quartet	011942=1	BB7264
Bluebird 7376	August 4, 1937	Stand in the Test in Judgement	Golden Gate Jubilee Quartet	011943=1	MW8551
Montgomery 8551	August 4, 1937	Stand in the Test in Judgement	Golden Gate Jubilee Quartet	011943=1	BB7376
Bluebird 7376	August 4, 1937	Story of Job	Golden Gate Jubilee Quartet	11940	MW8551
Montgomery 8551	August 4, 1937	Story of Job	Golden Gate Jubilee Quartet	11940	BB7376
Bluebird 7205	August 4, 1937	The Preacher and the Bear	Golden Gate Jubilee Quartet	011935=1	MW8548
Montgomery 8548	August 4, 1937	The Preacher and the Bear	Golden Gate Jubilee Quartet	011935=1	BB7205
Victor 27322	August 4, 1937	The Preacher and the Bear	Golden Gate Quartet	11935	-
Bluebird 7340	August 4, 1937	Won't There Be One Happy Time	Golden Gate Jubilee Quartet	011939=1	MW8550
Montgomery 8550	August 4, 1937	Won't There Be One Happy Time	Golden Gate Jubilee Quartet	011939=1	BB7340
Bluebird 7415	January 24, 1938	Carolina in the Morning	Golden Gate Jubilee Quartet	018622=1	MW8545
Montgomery 8545	January 24, 1938	Carolina in the Morning	Golden Gate Jubilee Quartet	018622=1	BB7415
Montgomery 8545	January 24, 1938	Dipsy Doodle	Golden Gate Jubilee Quartet	018628=1	BB7415
Bluebird 7513	January 24, 1938	I Was Brave	Golden Gate Jubilee Quartet	18633	MW7495*
Montgomery 7495	January 24, 1938	I Was Brave	Golden Gate Jubilee Quartet	18633	BB7513*
Bluebird 7631	January 24, 1938	John the Revelator	Golden Gate Jubilee Quartet	018625=1	MW7912
Montgomery 7912	January 24, 1938	John the Revelator	Golden Gate Jubilee Quartet	018625=1	BB7631+
Victor 27324	January 24, 1938	John the Revelator	Golden Gate Quartet	18625	-
Bluebird 7617	January 24, 1938	Lead Me on and On	Golden Gate Jubilee Quartet	018630=1	MW7494
Montgomery 7494	January 24, 1938	Lead Me on and On	Golden Gate Jubilee Quartet	018630=1	BB7617*
Bluebird 7463	January 24, 1938	Motherless Child	Golden Gate Jubilee Quartet	018623=2	MW7496
Montgomery 7496	January 24, 1938	Motherless Child	Golden Gate Jubilee Quartet	018623=2	BB7463*
Montgomery 8547	January 24, 1938	Ol' Man River	Golden Gate Jubilee Quartet	018635=1	BB8190+
Bluebird 7564	January 24, 1938	Pure Religion	Golden Gate Jubilee Quartet	018627=2	MW7493
Montgomery 7493	January 24, 1938	Pure Religion	Golden Gate Jubilee Quartet	018627=2	BB7564*
Bluebird 7564	January 24, 1938	Remember Me	Golden Gate Jubilee Quartet	18626	MW8547
Montgomery 8547	January 24, 1938	Remember Me	Golden Gate Jubilee Quartet	18626	BB7564
Victor 27324	January 24, 1938	Samson	Golden Gate Quartet	18632	-
Bluebird 7513	January 24, 1938	Samson & Delilah	Golden Gate Jubilee Quartet	18632	MW7495+
Montgomery 7495	January 24, 1938	Samson & Delilah	Golden Gate Jubilee Quartet	18632	BB7513+
Bluebird 7676	January 24, 1938	Swanee River	Golden Gate Jubilee Quartet	18629	MW8546
Montgomery 8546	January 24, 1938	Swanee River	Golden Gate Jubilee Quartet	18629	BB7676+
Bluebird 7676	January 24, 1938	Sweet Adeline	Golden Gate Jubilee Quartet	18631	MW8546
Montgomery 8546	January 24, 1938	Sweet Adeline	Golden Gate Jubilee Quartet	18631	BB7676*
Bluebird 7617	January 24, 1938	Take Your Burden to the Lord	Golden Gate Jubilee Quartet	018634=1	MW7494*
Montgomery 7494	January 24, 1938	Take Your Burdens to God	Golden Gate Jubilee Quartet	18634	BB7617+
Bluebird 7415	January 24, 1938	The Dipsy Doodle	Golden Gate Jubilee Quartet	BS018628-1	MW8545
Bluebird 7463	January 24, 1938	Travelin' Shoes	Golden Gate Jubilee Quartet	018624=1	MW7496
RCA 20-2073	January 24, 1938	Travelin' Shoes	Golden Gate Quartet	-	-
Montgomery 7496	January 24, 1938	Traveling Shoes	Golden Gate Jubilee Quartet	018624=1	BB7463+
Bluebird 7848	August 10, 1938	God Almighty Said	Golden Gate Jubilee Quartet	23464	MW7594
Montgomery 7594	August 10, 1938	God Almighty Said	Golden Gate Jubilee Quartet	23464	BB7848+
Bluebird 7835	August 10, 1938	Let That Liar Alone	Golden Gate Jubilee Quartet	23465	MW7595+
Montgomery 7595	August 10, 1938	Let That Liar Alone	Golden Gate Jubilee Quartet	23465	BB7835
Bluebird 7804	August 10, 1938	My Lord Is Waiting	Golden Gate Jubilee Quartet	23460	MW7596
Montgomery 7596A	August 10, 1938	MY LORD IS Writing	Golden Gate Jubilee Quartet	23460	BB7804A
Bluebird 7804	August 10, 1938	Rock My Soul	Golden Gate Jubilee Quartet	23461	MW7596*
Montgomery 7596B	August 10, 1938	Rock My Soul	Golden Gate Jubilee Quartet	23461	BB7804B
Bluebird 7835	August 10, 1938	To the Rock	Golden Gate Jubilee Quartet	23466	MW7595
Montgomery 7595	August 10, 1938	To the Rock	Golden Gate Jubilee Quartet	23466	BB7835
Bluebird 7897	August 10, 1938	When the Saints Go Marching In	Golden Gate Jubilee Quartet	23467	MW7864
Montgomery 7864	August 10, 1938	When the Saints Go Marching In	Golden Gate Jubilee Quartet	23467	BB7897*
Bluebird 7897	August 10, 1938	When They Ring the Golden Bells	Golden Gate Jubilee Quartet	23459	MW7864
Montgomery 7864	August 10, 1938	When They Ring the Golden Bells	Golden Gate Jubilee Quartet	23459	BB7897+
Bluebird 8019	November 15, 1938	Cheer the Weary Traveler	Golden Gate Jubilee Quartet	028962=1	MW7867*
Montgomery 7867	November 15, 1938	Cheer the Weary Traveler	Golden Gate Jubilee Quartet	028962=1	BB8019*
Bluebird 7962B	November 15, 1938	I Heard Zion Moan	Golden Gate Jubilee Quartet	028963!	MW7865
Bluebird 7994	November 15, 1938	Lord Am I Born to Die ?	Golden Gate Jubilee Quartet	028965!	MW7866+
Montgomery 7866	November 15, 1938	Lord Am I Born to Die ?	Golden Gate Jubilee Quartet	028965!	BB7994*
Bluebird 7962A	November 15, 1938	Noah	Golden Gate Jubilee Quartet	028964!	MW7865
Bluebird 8019	November 15, 1938	Packing Up, Getting Ready to Go	Golden Gate Jubilee Quartet	028967=1	MW7867+
Montgomery 7867	November 15, 1938	Packing Up, Getting Ready to Go	Golden Gate Jubilee Quartet	028967=1	BB8019+
Bluebird 7994	November 15, 1938	What Are They Doing in Heaven Today?	Golden Gate Jubilee Quartet	028966!	MW7866*
Montgomery 7866	November 15, 1938	What Are They Doing in Heaven Today?	Golden Gate Jubilee Quartet	028966!	BB7994*
Bluebird 10154	February 2, 1939	Change Partnners	Golden Gate Jubilee Quartet	031982=2	-
Bluebird 8123	February 2, 1939	Dese Bones Gonna Rise Agin	Golden Gate Jubilee Quartet	031976=1	MW7869+
Montgomery 7869	February 2, 1939	Dese Bones Gonna Rise Agin	Golden Gate Jubilee Quartet	031976=1	BB8123*
Bluebird 8087	February 2, 1939	Everything Moves by the Grace of God	Golden Gate Jubilee Quartet	31977	MW7868
Montgomery 7868	February 2, 1939	Everything Moves by the Grace of God	Golden Gate Jubilee Quartet	31977	BB8087+
Bluebird 8123	February 2, 1939	Lis'n to De Lambs	Golden Gate Jubilee Quartet	31975	MW7869*
Montgomery 7869	February 2, 1939	Lis'n to De Lambs	Golden Gate Jubilee Quartet	31975	BB8123+
Victor 27323	February 2, 1939	Noah	Golden Gate Quartet	31980	-
Bluebird 8160	February 2, 1939	Noah and the Ark	Golden Gate Jubilee Quartet	31980	MW8543
Montgomery 8543	February 2, 1939	Noah and the Ark	Golden Gate Jubilee Quartet	31980	BB8160
Bluebird 10154	February 2, 1939	Ol' Man Mose	Golden Gate Jubilee Quartet	31981	-
Bluebird 8190	February 2, 1939	Precious Lord	Golden Gate Jubilee Quartet	031979=1	MW8544
Montgomery 8544	February 2, 1939	Precious Lord	Golden Gate Jubilee Quartet	31979	BB8190
Bluebird 8160	February 2, 1939	This World Is in Bad Condition	Golden Gate Jubilee Quartet	31978	-
Montgomery 8543	February 2, 1939	This World Is in Bad Condition	Golden Gate Jubilee Quartet	31978	BB8160
Bluebird 8087	February 2, 1939	Troubles of the World	Golden Gate Jubilee Quartet	31974	MW7868
Montgomery 7868	February 2, 1939	Troubles of the World	Golden Gate Jubilee Quartet	31974	BB8087+
Bluebird 8286	October 6, 1939	Alone	Golden Gate Jubilee Quartet	42901	MW8774+
Montgomery 8774	October 6, 1939	Alone	Golden Gate Jubilee Quartet	42901	BB8286
Bluebird 8328	October 6, 1939	Everytime That I Feel the Spirit	Golden Gate Jubilee Quartet	042910=1	MW8776*
Montgomery 8776	October 6, 1939	Everytime That I Feel the Spirit	Golden Gate Jubilee Quartet	042910=1	BB8328
Bluebird 8328	October 6, 1939	He Said He Would Calm the Ocean	Golden Gate Jubilee Quartet	42902	MW8776+
Montgomery 8776	October 6, 1939	He Said He Would Calm the Ocean	Golden Gate Jubilee Quartet	42902	BB8328
Bluebird 8362	October 6, 1939	Hide Me in Thy Bosom	Golden Gate Jubilee Quartet	42903	MW8778*
Montgomery 8778	October 6, 1939	Hide Me in Thy Bosom	Golden Gate Jubilee Quartet	42903	BB8362
Bluebird 8348	October 6, 1939	I Looked Down the Line and I Wondered	Golden Gate Jubilee Quartet	042905=1	MW8777, RCA 20-3159
Montgomery 8777	October 6, 1939	I Looked Down the Line and I Wondered	Golden Gate Jubilee Quartet	042905=1	BB8348
RCA 20-3159	October 6, 1939	I Looked Down the Road and I Wondered	Golden Gate Quartet	-	Bb 8348
Bluebird 8362	October 6, 1939	I'm a Pilgrim	Golden Gate Jubilee Quartet	042909=1	MW8778+
Montgomery 8778	October 6, 1939	I'm a Pilgrim	Golden Gate Jubilee Quartet	42909	BB8362
Bluebird 8306	October 6, 1939	If I Had My Way	Golden Gate Jubilee Quartet	42904	MW8775+
Montgomery 8775	October 6, 1939	If I Had My Way	Golden Gate Jubilee Quartet	42904	BB8306
Bluebird 8620	October 6, 1939	Jonah in the Whale	Golden Gate Jubilee Quartet	042916=1	MW8781+
Montgomery 8781	October 6, 1939	Jonah in the Whale	Golden Gate Jubilee Quartet	042916=1	BB8620
Bluebird 8594	October 6, 1939	Julius Caesar	Golden Gate Jubilee Quartet	042914=1	MW8780*
Montgomery 8780	October 6, 1939	Julius Caesar	Golden Gate Jubilee Quartet	042914=1	BB8594*
Bluebird 8579	October 6, 1939	Stormy Weather	Golden Gate Jubilee Quartet	042912=1	MW8779*
Montgomery 8779	October 6, 1939	Stormy Weather	Golden Gate Jubilee Quartet	42912	BB8579+
Bluebird 8594	October 6, 1939	The Devil With the Devil	Golden Gate Jubilee Quartet	042913=1	MW8780
Montgomery 8780	October 6, 1939	The Devil With the Devil	Golden Gate Jubilee Quartet	042913=1	BB8594+
Bluebird 8620	October 6, 1939	Timber	Golden Gate Jubilee Quartet	042915=1	MW8781*
Montgomery 8781	October 6, 1939	Timber	Golden Gate Jubilee Quartet	042915=1	BB8620
Bluebird 8306	October 6, 1939	Way Down in Egyptland	Golden Gate Jubilee Quartet	042906=1	MW8775*
Montgomery 8775	October 6, 1939	Way Down in Egyptland	Golden Gate Jubilee Quartet	042906=1	BB8306
Bluebird 8286	October 6, 1939	What a Time	Golden Gate Jubilee Quartet	042900=1	MW8774*
Montgomery 8774	October 6, 1939	What a Time	Golden Gate Jubilee Quartet	042900=1	BB8286
Bluebird 8579	October 6, 1939	Whoa Babe	Golden Gate Jubilee Quartet	042911=1	MW8779+
Montgomery 8779	October 6, 1939	Whoa Babe	Golden Gate Jubilee Quartet	042911=1	BB8579*
Bluebird 8348	October 6, 1939	You'd Better Mind	Golden Gate Jubilee Quartet	042908=1	MW8777
Montgomery 8777	October 6, 1939	You'd Better Mind	Golden Gate Jubilee Quartet	042908=1	BB8348
Bluebird 8565	December 26, 1939	Darling Nellie Gray	Golden Gate Jubilee Quartet	46125	MW8783*
Montgomery 8783	December 26, 1939	Darling Nellie Gray	Golden Gate Jubilee Quartet	46125	BB8565
Bluebird 10569	December 26, 1939	My Prayer	Golden Gate Jubilee Quartet	BS046127-1	-
Bluebird 8565	December 26, 1939	My Walking Stick	Golden Gate Jubilee Quartet	046124=1	MW8783+
Montgomery 8783	December 26, 1939	My Walking Stick	Golden Gate Jubilee Quartet	046124=1	BB8565
Bluebird 8388	December 26, 1939	The Valley of Time	Golden Gate Jubilee Quartet	046129=1	MW8782
Montgomery 8782	December 26, 1939	Valley of Time	Golden Gate Jubilee Quartet	046129=1	BB8388
Bluebird 8388	December 26, 1939	What Did Jesus Say	Golden Gate Jubilee Quartet	046128=1	MW8782
Montgomery 8782	December 26, 1939	What Did Jesus Say	Golden Gate Jubilee Quartet	046128=1	BB8388
Bluebird 10569	December 26, 1939	What's New?	Golden Gate Quartet	BS046126-1	-
Victor 27268	June 15, 1940	Alabama Bound	Golden Gate Quartet with Huddie Ledbetter	51299	-
Victor 27266	June 15, 1940	Midnight Special	Golden Gate Quartet with Huddie Ledbetter	51298	-
Victor 27268	June 15, 1940	Pick a Bale of Cotton	Golden Gate Quartet with Huddie Ledbetter	51295	-
Victor 27267	June 17, 1940	Grey Goose	Golden Gate Quartet with Huddie Ledbetter	51327	-
Victor 27266	June 17, 1940	Ham and Eggs	Golden Gate Quartet with Huddie Ledbetter	51333	-
Victor 27267	June 17, 1940	Stew Ball	Golden Gate Quartet with Huddie Ledbetter	51329	-
Okeh 6204	April 18, 1941	Daniel Saw the Stone	Golden Gate Quartet	30282=1	-
Vocalion/Okeh 16009	April 18, 1941	I Yi Yi Yi	Golden Gate Jubilee Quartet	30289	-
Columbia 37835	April 18, 1941	Jezebel	Golden Gate Quartet	30283=2	oK6204
Okeh 6204	April 18, 1941	Jezebel	Golden Gate Quartet	30283=2	-
Columbia 37477	April 18, 1941	Time's Windin' Up	Golden Gate Quartet	30284=1	30044
Columbia 30044	April 18, 1941	Time's Winding Up	Golden Gate Quartet	30284	CO37477
Okeh 6238	May 25, 1941	Anyhow	Golden Gate Jubilee Quartet	30550	Co37477
Columbia 30044	May 25, 1941	Anyhow	Golden Gate Quartet	30550	CO37477
Columbia 37477	May 25, 1941	Anyhow	Golden Gate Quartet	30550=1	30044
Columbia 30043	May 25, 1941	Blind Barnabas	Golden Gate Quartet	30549	CO37476
Columbia 37476	May 25, 1941	Blind Barnabus	Golden Gate Quartet	30549	30043
Columbia 37834	May 25, 1941	Blind Barnabus	Golden Gate Quartet	CO30549	-
Okeh 6345	May 25, 1941	Blind Barnabus	Golden Gate Quartet	30549=2	-
Okeh 6529	May 25, 1941	Didn't It Rain	Golden Gate Jubilee Quartet	30551	Co37475
Columbia 30042	May 25, 1941	Didn't It Rain	Golden Gate Quartet	30551	CO37475
Columbia 37475	May 25, 1941	Didn't It Rain	Golden Gate Quartet	30551	30042
Columbia 37476	May 25, 1941	Sun Didn't Shine	Golden Gate Quartet	30548-2	30043
Okeh 6345	May 25, 1941	The Sun Didn't Shine	Golden Gate Jubilee Quartet	30548=1	Co37476
Columbia 30043	May 25, 1941	The Sun Didn't Shine	Golden Gate Quartet	30548-2	CO37476
Okeh 6238	May 25, 1941	Time's Winding Up	Golden Gate Jubilee Quartet	30284	Co37477
Okeh 6529	December 3, 1941	He Never Said a Humbling Word	Golden Gate Jubilee Quartet	31850	-
Columbia 30042	December 3, 1941	He Never Said a Mumblin' Word	Golden Gate Jubilee Quartet	31850	CO37475
Columbia 37475	December 3, 1941	He Never Said a Mumblin' Word	Golden Gate Quartet	31850	30042
Columbia 36937	December 3, 1941	Moses Smote the Waters	Golden Gate Quartet	CO31851	-
Columbia 30160	December 3, 1941	Toll the Bell Easy	Golden Gate Quartet	31849	-
Okeh 6712	March 25, 1942	Dip Your Fingers in the Water	Golden Gate Jubilee Quartet	32622	-
Okeh 6713	March 25, 1942	Run On	Golden Gate Quartet	32620-1	-
Okeh 6712	March 5, 1943	Stalin Wasn't Stallin'	Golden Gate Jubilee Quartet	33183=1	-
Okeh 6713	May 19, 1943	Comin' in on a Wing and a Prayer	Golden Gate Quartet	33216-1	-
Columbia 36937	March 16, 1945	Bones, Bones, Bones (Ezekiel in the Valley)	Golden Gate Quartet	CCO4426=1	-
Columbia 37832	March 16, 1945	I Will Be Home Again	Golden Gate Quartet	CCO4425=1	-
Okeh 6741	March 16, 1945	I Will Be Home Again	Golden Gate Quartet	CCO4425=1	-
Okeh 6741	March 16, 1945	The General Jumped at Dawn	Golden Gate Quartet	CCO4422=1	-
Columbia 37236	June 5, 1946	Atom and Evil	Golden Gate Quartet	CO36389=1	-
Columbia 37835	June 5, 1946	God's Gonna' Cut You Down	Golden Gate Quartet	CO36386	-
Columbia 30136	June 5, 1946	Hush	Golden Gate Quartet	CO36391	-
Columbia 37833	June 5, 1946	Joshua Fit the Battle of Jericho	Golden Gate Quartet	CO36392	-
Columbia 37832	June 5, 1946	No Restricted Signs	Golden Gate Quartet	CO36388	-
Columbia 37236	June 5, 1946	Shadrach	Golden Gate Quartet	CO36390=	-
Columbia 37834	June 5, 1946	Swing Down, Chariot	Golden Gate Quartet	CO36387	-
Columbia 37833	June 5, 1946	Wade in the Water	Golden Gate Quartet	CO36393	-
Columbia 37499	April 8, 1947	High, Low and Wide	Golden Gate Quartet	CO37602	-
Columbia 37499	April 8, 1947	Pray for the Lights to Go Out	Golden Gate Quartet	CO37601	-
Columbia 30128	1947-10-??	Abdullah	Golden Gate Quartet	CO38278	-
Columbia 30128	1947-10-??	Broodle-Oo Broodle-Oo	Golden Gate Quartet	38277!	-
Columbia 30136	1947-10-??	Do Unto Others	Golden Gate Quartet	CO38276	-
Columbia 30149	1948-10-??	She's Gonna Ruin You, Buddy	Golden Gate Quartet	CO40129	-
Columbia 30149	1948-10-??	I'm Just a Dreamer	Golden Gate Quartet	CO40131	-
Columbia 30160	1947-10-??	Fare You Well, Fare You Well	Golden Gate Quartet	38279	-
Capitol 10172	August 9, 1948	A Song was Born, part 1	Louis Armstrong With Jerri Sullivan and the Golden Gate Quartet	3426	-
Capitol 10172	August 9, 1948	A Song was Born, part 2	Louis Armstrong With Jerri Sullivan and the Golden Gate Quartet	3426	-
Mercury 8118	1948-12-??	Mene, Mene Takel	Golden Gate Quartet	2141	-
Mercury 8118	1948-12-??	Talking Jerusalem to Death	Golden Gate Quartet	2140	-
Mercury 8124	1949-01-??	Jesus Met the Woman at the Well	Golden Gate Quartet	2164	-
Mercury 5242	1949-01-??	Look Up	Golden Gate Quartet	2162	-
Mercury 8124	1949-01-??	Mary, Mary	Golden Gate Quartet	2165	-
Mercury 5242	1949-01-??	Will I Find My Love Today?	Golden Gate Quartet	2163	-
Mercury 8141	1949-04-??	John Saw	Golden Gate Quartet	2763	-
Mercury 8141	1949-04-??	Lord I Am Tired and Want to Go Home	Golden Gate Quartet	2766	-
Mercury 8243	1949-04-??	Lord, I Want to Be a Christian	Golden Gate Quartet	2765	-
Mercury 8243	1949-04-??	Seven Angels and Seven Trumpets	Golden Gate Quartet	2764	-
Mercury 8158	1949-07-??	Lord, I Want to Walk With Thee	Golden Gate Quartet	2863	-
Mercury 8155	1949-07-??	Religion Is a Fortune	Golden Gate Quartet	2859	-
Mercury 8155	1949-07-??	Satisfied	Golden Gate Quartet	2860	-
Mercury 8158	1949-07-??	You Ain't Got Faith	Golden Gate Quartet	2858	-
Columbia 39216	November 29, 1950	Listen to the Lambs	Golden Gate Quartet	GGQ1	-
Columbia 39216	November 29, 1950	Nicodemus	Golden Gate Quartet	GGQ3	-
Okeh 6897	1952-03-??	I Just Telephone Upstairs	Golden Gate Quartet	CO47724	-
Okeh 6897	1952-03-??	Rain Is the Teardrops of Angels	Golden Gate Quartet	CO47725	-
Mercury 5385	-	A Man Going...	Golden Gate Quartet	-	-
RCA 20-3308	-	Bedside of a Neighbor	Golden Gate Quartet	-	-
RCA 20-3308	-	Behold the Bride Groom Cometh	Golden Gate Quartet	-	-
Mercury 8164	-	Blessed Jesus	Golden Gate Quartet	2990	-
Mercury 5385	-	Didn't That Man Believe	Golden Gate Quartet	-	-
RCA 20-2921	-	Gabriel Blows His Horn	Golden Gate Quartet	-	-
Mercury 8164	-	Lord Have Mercy	Golden Gate Quartet	2993	-
Apollo 1205	-	Mary Had a Baby	Golden Gate Quartet	-	-
Mercury 8162	-	Ride on Moses	Golden Gate Quartet	2995=2	-
RCA 20-2921	-	Rock My Soul	Golden Gate Quartet	-	-
Apollo 1205	-	Rudolph the Red Nosed Reindeer	Golden Gate Quartet	-	-
Mercury 8162	-	Same Train	Golden Gate Quartet	2994=2	-
Apollo 1204	-	Silent Night	Golden Gate Quartet	-	-
RCA 20-2797	-	Stand in the Test of Judgement	Golden Gate Quartet	-	-
RCA 20-2799	-	Stand in the Test of Judgement	Golden Gate Quartet	-	-
RCA 20-3159	-	The World Is in a Bad Condition	Golden Gate Quartet	-	-
RCA 20-2797	-	When the Saints Go Marching In	Golden Gate Quartet	-	-
RCA 20-2799	-	When the Saints Go Marching In	Golden Gate Quartet	-	-
Apollo 1204	-	White Christmas	Golden Gate Quartet	-	-

=== Selected albums ===
- 2010 – Incredible
- 2003 – The Good Book
- 2003 – Gospel Train
- 1999 – Our Story
- 1997 – The Very Best of the Golden Gate Quartet
- 1961 – Negro Spirituals
- 1957 – That Golden Chariot
- 1956 – The Golden Gate Quartet [Camden]
- 1950 – The Golden Gate Spirituals
- 1949 – Joshua fit the battle
