= J. B. Long =

American politician

James Baxter Long Sr. (December 25, 1903 – February 25, 1975) was an American store manager, owner, and record company talent scout, responsible in the 1930s for discovering Fulton Allen ("Blind Boy Fuller") and Gary Davis, among other notable blues musicians.

== Biography ==
Long was born in Mecklenburg County, North Carolina to parents Henry Baxter Long and Minnie Swarigen Long. When he was three years old, his family moved to Hickory, North Carolina, where he lived until he moved to eastern North Carolina circa 1926. Also in 1926, he married Elizabeth "Frankie" Mae Johnson.

By 1933, Long was working in Kinston, North Carolina, as the manager of the regional chain, the United Dollar Store. During an interview in the 1970s, Long recalled:

I'd always loved music ... down in Kinston, the farmers were coming in selling tobacco. ... I got this old phonograph out and began to pile a few records in. The more I played, the more they stayed. ... So from that basis on I ordered a few records and they [the United Dollar Store] began to buy 'em and sell 'em there. Everybody thought that the radios'd kill the record business, but I satisfied so many people that I went ahead and ordered more and more [records].

It was also while he was in Kinston that he first began recruiting local music talent to make recordings. In early 1934, people began coming by his store asking for a song about a deadly wreck between a train and a car in nearby Lumberton, North Carolina; Long found out that no such song existed, but received permission from the American Record Corporation (whose records he was selling through the store) to have someone record the song. Long wrote the song, with the help of a local female journalist, and titled the song the "Lumberton Wreck". He held a local talent contest for white musicians, and a group by the name of the Cauley Family from nearby Duplin County, North Carolina won the contest, recording the song (and 23 others) in a three-day New York City recording session August 7–9, 1934. It was the only time Long recorded a white musician or group.

Long began recording African American groups after holding a local talent contest for black musicians at the nearby Old Central Warehouse in June 1934. The winner of this first black contest was the Mitchell's Christian Singers, a local Kinston gospel quartet.

In late 1934, due to his success as the manager of the Kinston store, the United Dollar Store company transferred Long to Durham, North Carolina, a larger, more important store.

In 1935, Long and his family moved to Burlington, North Carolina, again as the manager of the United Dollar Store. He later became owner-operator of the Burlington Discount Department Store on West Davis Street. Also in 1935, Long was made the southern regional talent scout for the Columbia Recording Corporation, a subsidiary of the Columbia Broadcasting Corporation. Several times a year he traveled with various musicians and bands that he had "discovered" to New York City or Chicago to make recordings of their songs. Not long afterwards, the Rev. Gary Davis (an ordained Baptist minister) was discovered by Long, and soon thereafter, Long arranged for Davis to make his first trip to New York City, where he recorded 15 sides between July 23 and July 26, 1935.

Perhaps his most famous talent discovery was Fulton Allen, Long bestowing on him the pseudonym "Blind Boy Fuller." Long is credited with helping to write several of Fuller's songs. In July 1937, Fuller travelled to New York City to record for the Decca label; since he had never signed a contract with Long, Long bluffed Decca, telling Decca that he had an exclusive contract with Fuller. Because of this, Long made sure he had a signed contract with Fuller after that, which placed him under Long's permanent management.

In 1938, Blind Boy Fuller's friend and bandmate, washboard player George Washington (a.k.a. Bull City Red), introduced Brownie McGhee to Long. Because Fuller was unable to make the recording session, Long persuaded Columbia to give McGhee an audition. McGhee's first recording session was on August 6, 1940, lasted for two days, and produced 12 sides. Following Fuller's death in February 1941, Long promoted McGhee as "Blind Boy Fuller #2".

Regarding the common-held perception that Long exploited the musicians he represented, McGhee said:

A lot of people give J.B. Long a hard time, but I don't give J.B. Long a hard time. I thought he was a marvelous fellow. He may not have given me every dime I was supposed to get, but how much did I know I was supposed to get? He saw some talent, he saw some quality involved and he used his ingenuity to get me on record, so automatically I owe him a vote of thanks for gettin' Brownie McGhee alive. Long made it possible for me to get on records, so what little money he did take from me, if any at all, he was entitled to it. He didn't take something from me. He made it possible for me to get something for myself if I was intelligent enough to go on and do it and not stop and sit down. And that's what I mean: Anybody blazes a path to a highway that never end, you should appreciate 'em some.

On the other hand, Sonny Terry, the longtime performing partner of Brownie McGhee, had a different impression of Long, stating: “I’ll tell you something about J. B. Long, he had a mean streak in him back in them days. There’s two ways of looking at a man like that. He helped people get recorded, but he made money on it himself and a lot of times got copyrights on songs he never wrote…. And what you noticed most was it was you out on the streets scufflin’, trying to get by, not him.”

In June 1939, Long was elected mayor of the city of Elon College, North Carolina. Between 1952 and 1972, he served five terms as a member of the Alamance County Board of Commissioners.

He died on February 25, 1975, and was buried in the Magnolia Cemetery, in Elon, North Carolina.
