= Escondida (album) =

Studio album by Jolie Holland
- Released: April 27, 2004
- Recorded: 2004
- Genre: Folk jazz
- Length: 48:06
- Label: Anti-
- Producer: Jolie Holland; Lemon DeGeorge

Jolie Holland chronology
Catalpa (2003)	Escondida (2004)	Springtime Can Kill You (2006)

Professional ratings
Aggregate scores
Source	Rating
Metacritic	83/100
Review scores
Source	Rating
AllMusic	4/5 stars
Blender	3/5 stars
Entertainment Weekly	A−
The Guardian	4/5 stars
The Independent	4/5 stars
Mojo	4/5 stars
Pitchfork	7.0/10
Q	4/5 stars
Rolling Stone	3.5/5 stars
Uncut	4/5 stars

Escondida is the second studio album by American musician Jolie Holland, released on April 27, 2004, by Anti-. "Escondida" means "hidden" in Spanish and Portuguese.

== Track listing ==
All tracks written by Jolie Holland, except where noted.

1. "Sascha" – 3:08
2. "Black Stars" – 4:54
3. "Old Fashioned Morphine" – 4:35
4. "Amen" – 3:32
5. "Mad Tom of Bedlam" (Traditional) – 2:52
6. "Poor Girl's Blues" – 5:26
7. "Goodbye California" – 3:28
8. "Do You?" – 4:49
9. "Darlin Ukulele" (Holland, Samantha Parton) - 4:07
10. "Damn Shame" – 4:49
11. "Tiny Idyll/Lil Missy" – 2:41
12. "Faded Coat of Blue" (Traditional) – 3:47

== Personnel ==
- Jolie Holland – voice, guitar, piano, ukulele
- Dave Mihaly – drums, marimba, voice
- Brian Miller – electric guitar, acoustic guitar, voice
- Keith Cary – double bass, mandolin, banjo
- Ara Anderson – trumpet
- Enzo Garcia – musical saw
- Paul Scriver – soprano saxophone
