= Springtime Can Kill You =

Studio album by Jolie Holland
- Released: May 8, 2006
- Recorded: 2006
- Genres: Alternative country, folk
- Length: 43:51
- Label: Anti-
- Producer: Jolie Holland

Jolie Holland chronology
| Escondida (2004) | Springtime Can Kill You (2006) | The Living and the Dead (2008) |

Professional ratings
Aggregate scores
| Source | Rating |
|---|---|
| Metacritic | 78/100 |
Review scores
| Source | Rating |
| AllMusic | 4/5 stars |
| Billboard | favorable |
| Entertainment Weekly | A |
| Pitchfork | 6.9/10 |
| PopMatters | 7/10 |

Springtime Can Kill You is Jolie Holland's third studio album. It was released in Europe on May 8, 2006, and in the United States on May 9, 2006, through Anti-.

== Track listing ==
All songs by Jolie Holland except when specified

1. "Crush in the Ghetto" – 3:01
2. "Mehitabel's Blues" (Jolie Holland/Brian Miller) – 3:21
3. "Springtime Can Kill You" (Jolie Holland/Brian Miller) – 2:48
4. "Crazy Dreams" (CR Avery) – 2:22
5. "You're Not Satisfied" (adaptation of "Though you're not satisfied" written by Riley Pucket) – 2:09
6. "Stubborn Beast" – 4:06
7. "Don't Tell 'Em" – 2:29
8. "Moonshiner" – 3:32
9. "Ghostly Girl" – 3:34
10. "Nothing Left to Do but Dream" – 7:24
11. "Adieu False Heart" (traditional) – 2:36
12. "Mexican Blue" – 6:29

== Personnel ==
- Jolie Holland - voice, piano, whistle, box fiddle, guitar
- Brian Miller - guitars, piano, percussion, rhodes, electric bass, glockenspiel
- Keith Cary - upright bass, harmony vocals, tuba, lap steel, cello, Hawaiian guitar
- David Mihaly - drum kit, tiny bells
- Peter Musselman - french horn, accordion
- Ara Anderson - baritone horn, pump organ
- Feddi Price - mellophone
- Olive Mitra - electric bass
- Sonny Smith - hammond b3 organ
- Carvell Wallace - harmony vocals
- David Dondero - voice
- Kate Klaire - harmony vocals
