= Obadiah (album) =

Studio album by Frazey Ford
- Released: July 20, 2010
- Genre: Folk
- Length: 58:33
- Label: Nettwerk
- Producer: John Raham

Obadiah is the 2010 debut album by Canadian musician Frazey Ford, who is also a member of the Be Good Tanyas.

== Background ==
Obadiah is recorded in the style of soul music, a departure from the folk sound of the Be Good Tanyas. The album takes its title from Ford's middle name, "Obadiah". When she was born, her parents asked her brothers to choose her middle name; they decided to name her after their pet cat Obadiah that had recently run away.

== Recording ==
Ford recorded the album with guitarist Trish Klein, also of the Be Good Tanyas. Klein's partner, John Raham, played drums and produced the record. Ford's mother, neighbour, and landlord also appear on the album.

== Themes ==
Ford has said that the album relates to an emotional time she had with her family. The record, according to Ford, also allowed her to bring together "a soul rhythm section...[and]....folk style writing", two of her great loves in music that had previously been "divided in [her] musicality".

== Reception ==
Ben Ratliff of the New York Times gave the album a favourable review and commended Ford's blending of soul and country influences. He compared her singing to a diverse group of artists, including Dolly Parton, Ann Peebles, and Feist.

Professional ratings
Review scores
Source	Rating
AllMusic	3/5 stars
The New York Times	Favorable
Pitchfork Media	7.1

== Track listing ==
Track number	Song	Writer(s)	Length
1	"Firecracker"	Ford	3:45
2	"Lay Down with You"	Ford	4:32
3	"Bird of Paradise"	Ford	5:17
4	"If You Gonna Go"	Ford	3:56
5	"Blue Streak Mama"	Ford	3:46
6	"Lost Together"	Ford	4:31
7	"I Like You Better"	Ford	4:36
8	"Hey Little Mama"	Ford	4:24
9	"The Gospel Song"	Ford	5:42
10	"Going Over"	Ford	3:13
11	"Half In"	Ford	5:05
12	"One More Cup of Coffee"	Bob Dylan	4:19
13	"Mimi Song"	Ford	5:27
14	"Lovers in a Dangerous Time" †	Bruce Cockburn	4:37

† Bonus track on some editions of the album.
