= Bull City Red =

American singer

- Also known as: Oh Red
- Born: George Washington; February 19, 1917; Indiantown, South Carolina or Durham, North Carolina, United States
- Died: October 1958 (age 41)
- Genres: Piedmont blues, East Coast blues, country blues, gospel
- Occupations: Singer, guitarist, washboard player
- Instruments: Vocals, guitar, washboard
- Years active: Early 1930s-early 1940s
- Label: Vocalion
- Formerly of: Blind Boy Fuller, Reverend Gary Davis, Sonny Terry, Brownie McGhee, Sonny Jones

Bull City Red (born George Washington, February 19, 1917 – October 1958) was an American Piedmont blues guitarist, singer, and predominantly washboard player, most closely associated with Blind Boy Fuller and the Reverend Gary Davis. Little is known of his life outside of his recording career.

== Biography ==
Washington was born in Indiantown, South Carolina, though some sources state Durham, North Carolina. His primary nickname, "Bull City Red", came from the "Bull City" nickname for Durham, where he grew up. A partial albino, he was sometimes alternatively billed as Oh Red, also the name of a popular song written by Joe McCoy and first recorded in 1936 by the Harlem Hamfats. Red and Fuller recorded their own version of the song, titled "New Oh Red!", in 1937. Although he was just good enough as a guitarist to imitate Fuller, with whom he frequently played, he was a talented washboard player and also sang.

Red was a street musician in Durham before becoming the sole sighted member of a band managed by the talent scout J. B. Long, which included at various times Fuller, Sonny Terry and Davis. In 1935, then a trio featuring Red, Davis, and Fuller, the band went to New York to enter the recording studio for the first time, in a session for the American Record Corporation (ARC). As his collaborators were blind, Red signaled them by touch when the recording process was ready to end. Accompanying Fuller along with Terry, Red recorded many songs for ARC's Perfect label between 1935 and Fuller's death during surgery in 1941.

Red also recorded songs based on gospel music with Fuller, Terry, and Sonny Jones, under the name of Brother George and His Sanctified Singers. He recorded "I Saw the Light" with guitar backing by Davis. On Fuller's latterday compilation album, Get Your Yas Yas Out, Red played the washboard on "Jitterbug Rag". Between 1935 and 1939, he struck out on his own as well, recording solo with his own vocals, guitar and washboard. His tracks included "Black Woman and Poison Blues" and "I Won't Be Dogged Around".

In 1941, Red became involved with another band. In late 1940, he had introduced Brownie McGhee and his collaborator Jordan Webb to his manager, John Baxter Long, and also to Fuller and Terry. After Fuller's death, the group came together along with another washboard player, Robert Young, to record.

Red died in 1958, at an unknown location.

== See also ==
- List of East Coast blues musicians
