= Wine Dark Sea (Jolie Holland album) =

Studio album by Jolie Holland
- Released: May 20, 2014
- Length: 54:58
- Label: Anti-

Jolie Holland chronology
Pint of Blood (2011)	Wine Dark Sea (2014)	Wildflower Blues (2017)

Wine Dark Sea is the sixth solo album of American musician Jolie Holland. The album was released on May 20, 2014, through Anti- records.

== Critical reception ==
Professional ratings
Aggregate scores
Source	Rating
Metacritic	83/100
Review scores
Source	Rating
AllMusic	4.5/5 stars
American Songwriter	3.5/5 stars
Evening Standard	4/5 stars
Exclaim!	8/10
Mojo	3/5 stars
Now	4/5 stars
Paste	7.0/10
PopMatters	8/10
Record Collector	4/5 stars
Uncut	9/10

Wine Dark Sea received a score of 83 out of 100 on review aggregator Metacritic based on 11 critics' reviews, indicating "universal acclaim". Thom Jurek of AllMusic called the album "a raw, often raucous presentation, balanced by Holland's mature poetic vision and her continued exploration of American musical forms. She effortlessly links them, one source to another, as seemingly disparate performance styles are filtered through a universal language, the love song, and all 11 tracks here are just that; Holland's are filled with tenderness, ferocity, fearlessness, and unfettered desire".

== Track listing ==
1. "On and On" – 3:56
2. "First Sign of Spring" – 4:56
3. "Dark Days" – 5:22
4. "Route 30" – 4:51
5. "I Thought It Was the Moon" – 4:02
6. "The Love You Save" – 5:18
7. "All the Love" – 4:18
8. "Saint Dymphna" – 6:18
9. "Palm Wine Drunkard" – 6:07
10. "Out on the Wine Dark Sea" – 5:53
11. "Waiting for the Sun" – 3:57

== Personnel ==
- Jolie Holland – producer, bandleader, mixing, voice, piano, whistling, violin, guitar
- Adam Brisbin – guitar
- Indigo Street – guitar
- Doug Weiselman – guitar, bass guitar, reeds
- Geoffrey Muller – bass guitar
- Justin Veloso – drums
- Dan Rieser – drums
- Douglas Jenkins – cello, engineer, mixing, producer
- Larry Crane – mixing
- Joe Tex – composer
- Chanticleer Tru – guest artist, vocals
- Garrett Haines – mastering
