= Orlandus Wilson =

American singer (1917–1998)

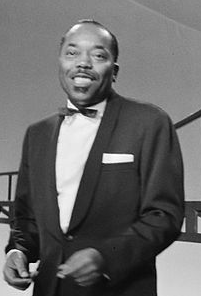
Wilson on stage, 1964

Orlandus Wilson (August 27, 1917 in Chesapeake, Virginia – December 30, 1998 in Paris) was one of the longest standing members of the Golden Gate Quartet and the group's bass singer.

He joined the Golden Gate Jubilee Singers in 1934 and only announced his retirement from the quartet in October 1998. Apart from a forced break in 1944 when he was drafted and temporarily replaced by Cliff Givens, Wilson supplied the basis for the quartet. Wilson managed the formation, and supplied a majority of the arrangements and some compositions. His rhythmic feel has been said to be essential to the group's "jump, glide, bounce and swing".

== Personal life ==
With his wife, Gun, Wilson had a son. He relocated to Paris, along with the rest of the group, in 1958, and died there in 1998. He remained an active performer almost until his death.
