= The Be Good Tanyas =

Canadian folk music group

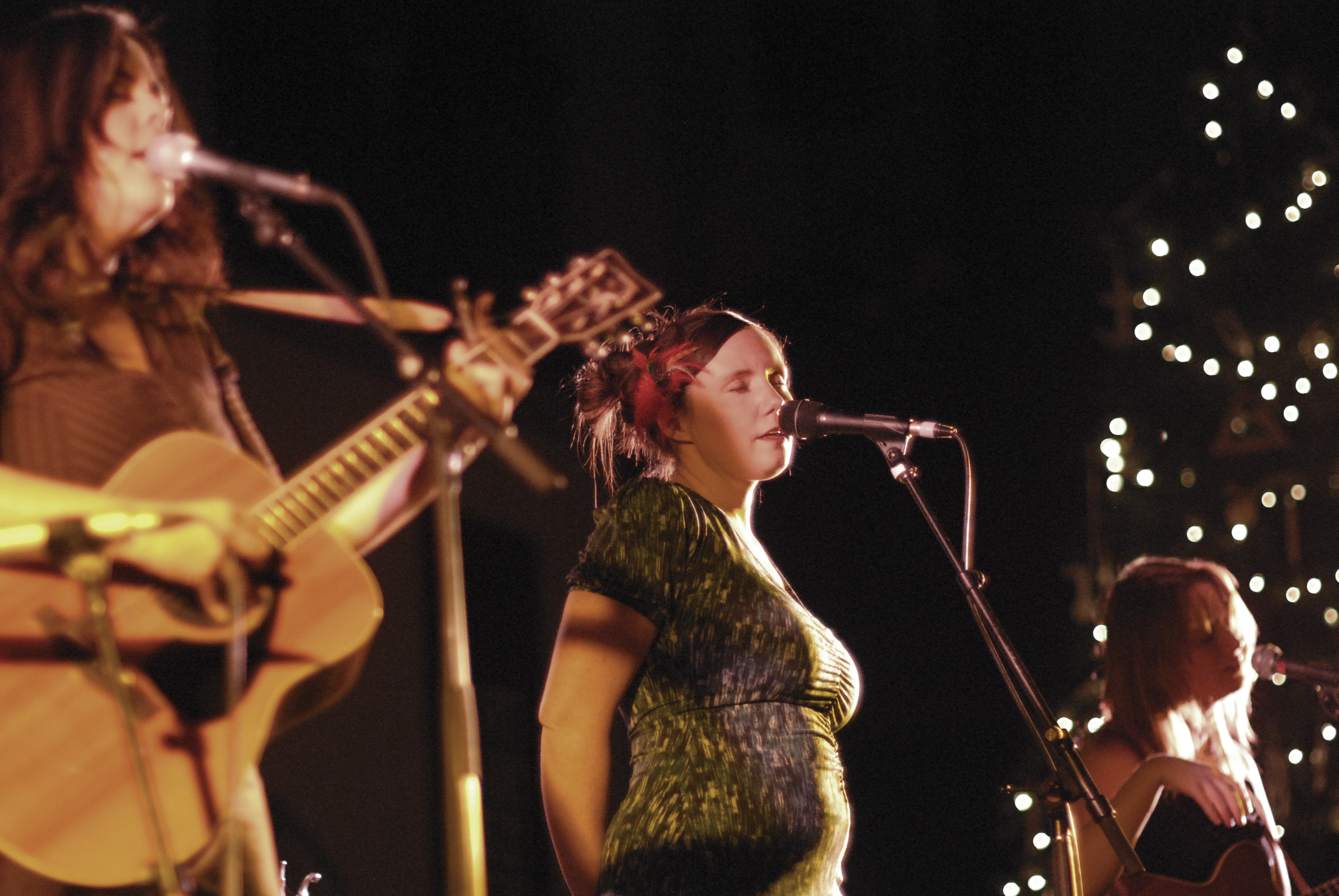
- The Be Good Tanyas in 2006

Background information
- Origin: Vancouver, Canada
- Genre: Folk
- Years active: 1999–present
- Labels: Nettwerk, Birthday Cake
- Members: Frazey Ford; Samantha Parton; Trish Klein
- Past members: Jolie Holland
- Website: begoodtanyas.com

The Be Good Tanyas are a Canadian folk music group formed in Vancouver in 1999. Their influences include folk, country, and bluegrass. The style of music they perform can be referred to as alt-country or Americana.

== History ==
The Be Good Tanyas formed in 1999 in Vancouver, British Columbia. Samantha Parton had been living on the road as a tree planter and wandering and making music, when she met Jolie Holland. The two began playing songs, including one called "Be Good Tanya", which had been written by a friend of Holland's. They added a mutual friend, Trish Klein, and Frazey Ford, who had been planting trees with Parton, joined the trio. They went on their first tour, opening for Bill Bourne. Holland left the band before the release of their debut album, Blue Horse, on which she appears prominently.

In 2000, the Be Good Tanyas embarked on a North American tour that ran from Vancouver to New Orleans, before returning to BC to record Blue Horse, which was released in 2001. The record, described as a "simple yet provocative and enchanting collection of tunes", is said, in the same article, to have been recorded in a "run down shack on the outskirts of Vancouver...[which]...provided the perfect home for the Tanyas to spin their charming tales into songs".

The group's second album, Chinatown, followed in 2003. Times Colonist noted in a review that the album represented the group's "well-earned...unblemished reputation for interpreting traditional folk songs and penning moving originals". Their third album, Hello Love, was released on October 10, 2006, with one critic noting that "Ford's curiously breathy and intimate singing creates an immediate connection with the listener...[and]...all the music has a kitchen-porch feel punctuated by the meditative plunk of the mandolin and banjo".

The Tanyas gained US exposure when the Showtime series The L Word selected one of their songs, "In Spite of All the Damage", for inclusion on its soundtrack. A live version of "In My Time of Dying" was also included in the third episode of the third season, in which Ford was featured as a nun and played the song in the opening sequence. The track "The Littlest Birds" was played during the first season of the Showtime series Weeds and was included on the soundtrack. The band's music has also featured in the CTV series The Eleventh Hour and in the film Because of Winn-Dixie. Their cover of Townes Van Zandt's "Waiting Around to Die" was also used in "Bit by a Dead Bee", an episode of AMC's Breaking Bad. Their rendition of "What Are They Doing in Heaven?" was played on the episode "Searchers" of the AMC series Hell on Wheels.

After the release of the first two Be Good Tanyas albums, Klein collaborated with Alison Russell under the band name Po' Girl. The Be Good Tanyas took a break from touring and recording in 2008.

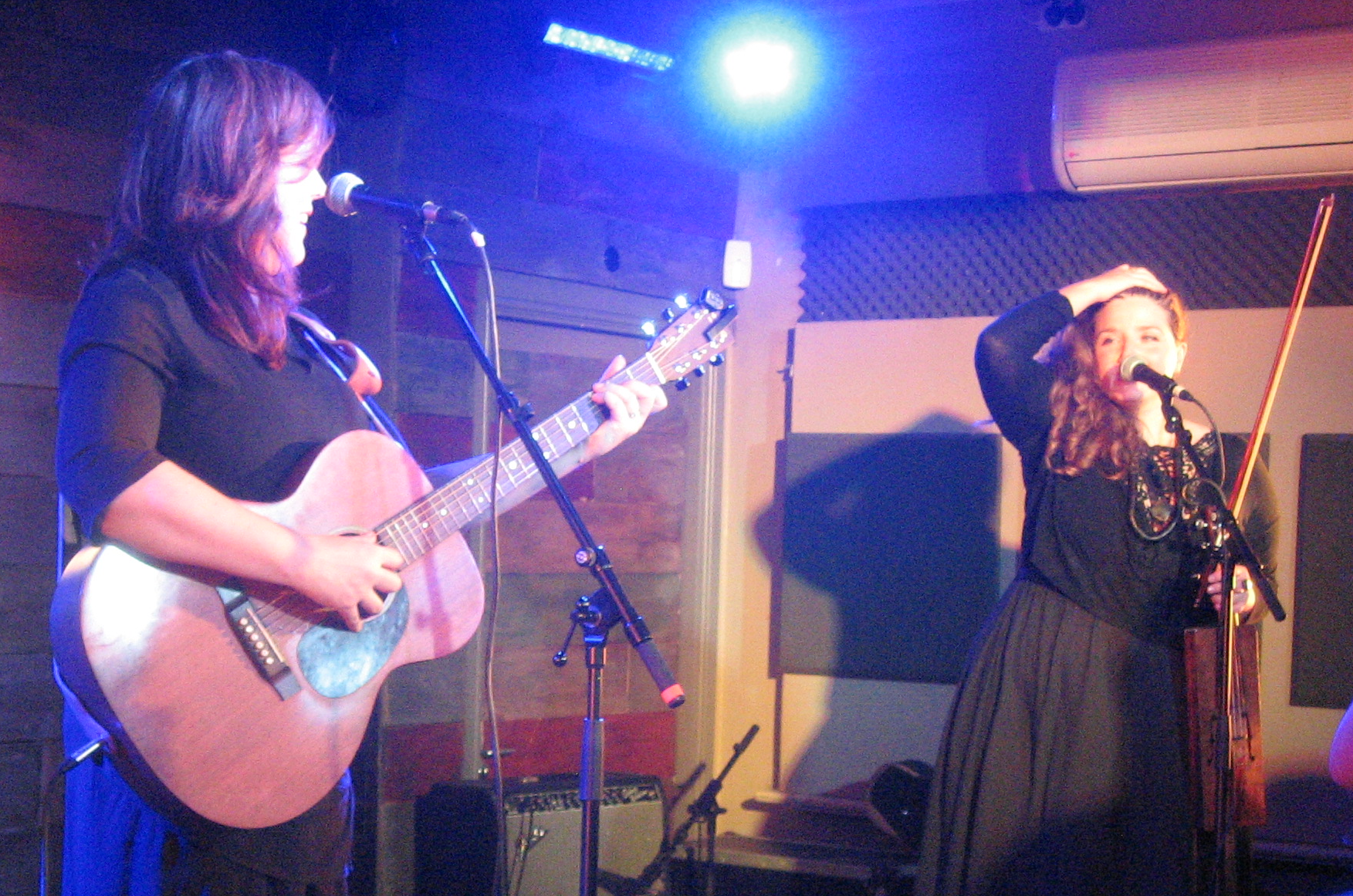
Samantha Parton and Jolie Holland in Cambridge, England, 2017

In 2010, Frazey Ford released her debut solo album, Obadiah, which featured Klein on guitar. Ford said making the recording allowed her to explore soul music more than she had with the Be Good Tanyas. She also noted that some of the songs reflected her role as a new parent, [and she had enjoyed] "exploring the concepts that are relevant to my life in terms of motherhood and generations".

In 2011, it was announced that the Be Good Tanyas would return to performing, beginning with an appearance at the Winnipeg Folk Festival. Following this, the band released a retrospective of their work, A Collection (2012), which featured selections from previous albums and two new songs. This release saw them touring throughout North America and Europe, including an appearance in San Francisco at the Outside Lands festival. While there, the band was invited to Grateful Dead guitarist Bob Weir's studio, TRI Studios, where they recorded three songs.

In September 2012, Parton suffered a concussion as a vehicle in which she was a passenger was struck from behind by a pickup truck. Medical procedures on her head during her convalescence revealed an aneurysm behind her left eye as well as a benign tumor. Parton took a leave of absence as the band continued touring North America and Europe in 2013, with fellow Vancouver musician and visual artist Caroline Ballhorn filling in.

In 2014, Ford released her second solo album, Indian Ocean. It was recorded at the Hi Recording Studio in Memphis, Tennessee, with various members of Al Green's original backing band, the Hi Rhythm Section, and Trish Klein contributing electric guitar on two tracks. Indian Ocean is described by one reviewer as [striking]..."a fine balance between light and dark, between elegiac, soul-lifting musicality and confessional, soul-baring lyricism". Ford toured worldwide in support of Indian Ocean, and in 2019, she announced her third album, U Kin B the Sun, released the following year to critical acclaim.

In 2016, Parton resumed touring, accompanied by former band member Jolie Holland, and in September 2017, they released their long-awaited album Wildflower Blues, on Cinquefoil Records.

== Band members ==
Current

- Frazey Ford – guitar, vocals
- Samantha Parton – guitar, mandolin, banjo, vocals
- Trish Klein – guitar, banjo, vocals

Past

- Jolie Holland

== Discography ==
Albums

- Blue Horse (2001)
- Chinatown (2003)
- Hello Love (2006)
- A Collection (2000–2012) (2012)

Singles

Year	Single	Album
2000	"The Littlest Birds"	Blue Horse
2003	"It's Not Happening"	Chinatown
2006	"Scattered Leaves"	Hello Love

Other contributions

- Live at the World Café: Vol. 15 – Handcrafted (2002, World Café) – "The Littlest Birds"
- 107.1 KGSR Radio Austin – Broadcasts Vol. 10 (2002) – "Light Enough to Travel"
- Northern Songs: Canada's Best and Brightest (2008, Hear Music) – "Ootischenia"
