= Jolie Holland =

American musician (born 1975)

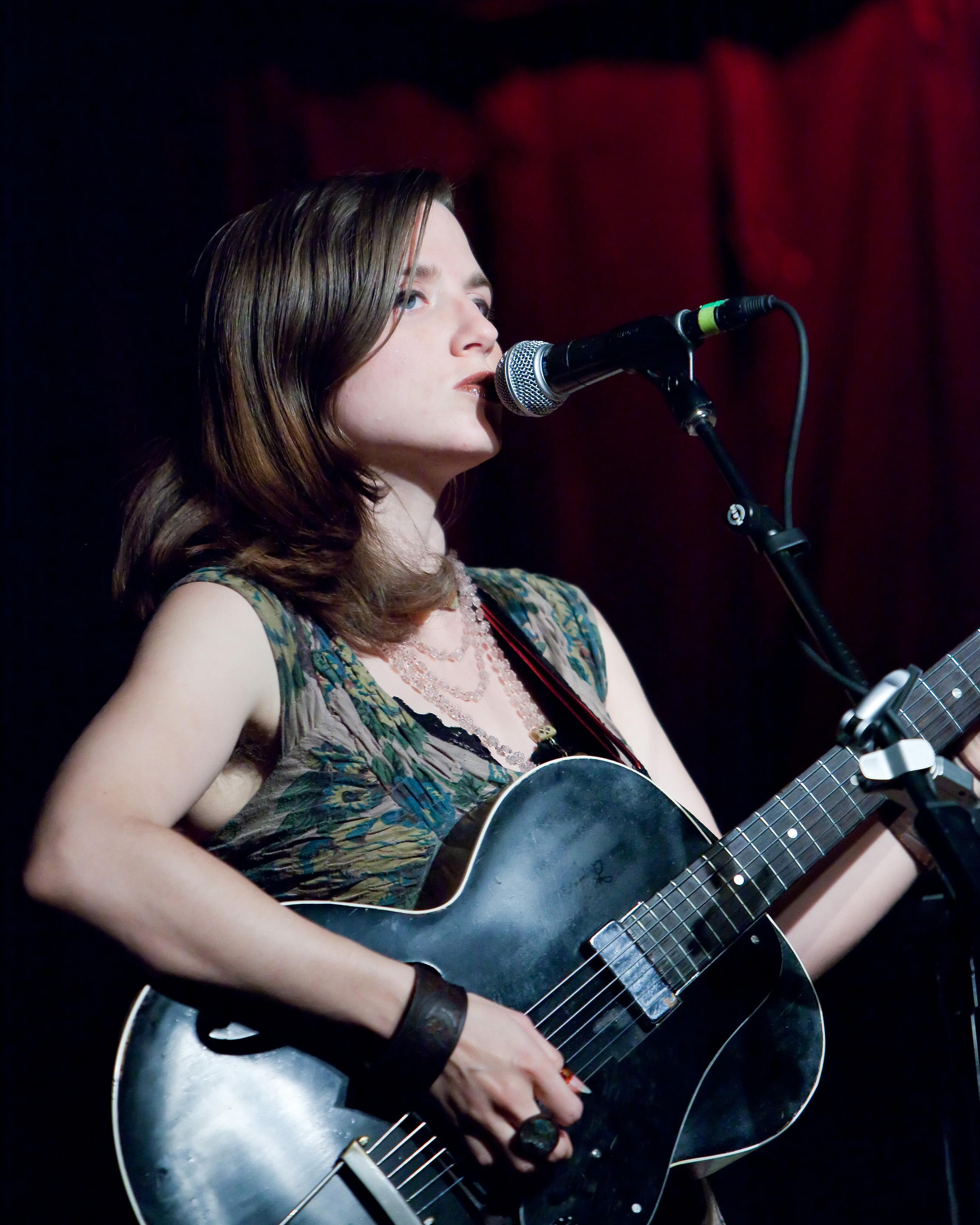
- Jolie Holland performing in 2009

Background information
- Born: September 11, 1975 (age 50); Houston, Texas, U.S.
- Genres: Rock, traditional, experimental, Americana
- Occupation: Musician
- Instruments: Vocals, piano, guitar, violin, viola, whistling
- Label: ANTI-
- Website: joliehollandmusic.com

Jolie Holland (born September 11, 1975) is an American singer and performer who combines elements of folk, traditional, experimental, and rock.

== Career ==
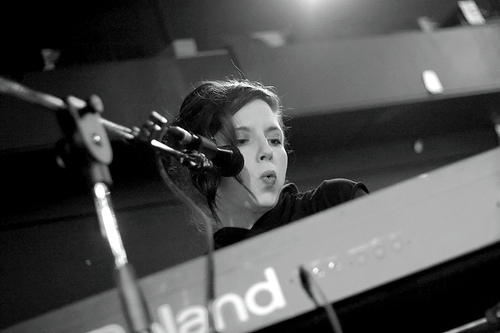
Holland at the keyboards

Growing up in her birthplace of Houston, Texas, Holland left in 1994, moving to Austin, New Orleans, and San Francisco before ending up in Vancouver, Canada, where she was one of the founding members of The Be Good Tanyas. Holland left the band before the release of their debut album, Blue Horse, on which she appears prominently. She returned to San Francisco, where she recorded her first album, 2002's Catalpa. Originally self-released, the album was later picked up and re-released by ANTI-. In 2004 she released her first album for ANTI-, Escondida. ANTI- labelmates Tom Waits and Sage Francis are both outspoken fans of Holland's: Waits nominated her for the Shortlist music prize, while Francis has said that Escondida was his most listened to album of 2005.

As well as releasing another four solo albums for ANTI- and touring globally, Holland has performed a number of collaborations with other artists, including with fan Sage Francis (on his album Human the Death Dance) and Booker T. (with whom she recorded "What A Wonderful World" in 2007). In 2016, she reunited with Be Good Tanyas bandmate Samantha Parton and they began touring as a duo, releasing the jointly-credited album Wildflower Blues, on Cinquefoil Records, in 2017 and embarking on a joint tour through 2018.

== Discography ==
=== Studio albums ===
- Catalpa (2003)
- Escondida (2004)
- Springtime Can Kill You (2006)
- The Living and the Dead (2008)
- Pint of Blood (2011)
- Wine Dark Sea (2014)
- Wildflower Blues with Samantha Parton (2017)
- Haunted Mountain (2023)
- Wolf Dispatch with Max Knouse (2025)

=== Live albums ===
- Jolie Holland and the Quiet Orkestra (2002)

=== Contributions ===
- Multiple vocal, instrumental, and writing contributions on the Be Good Tanyas' debut album, Blue Horse, released in 2000 (after Holland's departure from the band).
- Multiple collaborations with David Dondero, including backing vocals on the song "Analysis of a 1970's Divorce" on Dondero's 2001 album Shooting at the Sun With a Water Gun
- Lead vocals on The Grey Funnel Line on Hal Willner's Rogue's Gallery: Pirate Ballads, Sea Songs, and Chanteys (2006, ANTI-)
- Backing vocals for Bad Religion frontman Greg Graffin's studio solo album Cold as the Clay
- Violin on The Speakers' album Yeats Is Greats
- Backing vocals on Chuck Ragan's album Feast or Famine
- Lyrics and performance of Flood of Dreams in the film King of California
- Backing vocals on "Cinders of the Sun" and "Heart of Misery" for Steve Abel and the Chrysalids' album Flax Happyon
- Backing vocals on David Gray's "Kathleen"
- Contributed to two tracks on Sage Francis' Human the Death Dance and is featured in the video for "Got Up This Morning"
- Backing vocals on "Songs for Love Drunk Sinners" by Jan Bell and the Cheap Dates
- Collaboration with Booker T. Jones on the album "What A Wonderful World"
- Backing vocals on "Old/New" by Frally
- Backing vocals on "Alabama chicken" and "Rattlesnake charm (Dream machine)" by Sean Hayes
- Mixing and engineering by Joel Hamilton on the album "The Living and The Dead"
- Duet with Guy Garvey on "Electricity" from the 2015 album Courting the Squall
- Backing vocals and violin on Eric Terino's "Innovations of Grave Perversity" LP and "Body Gets Stoned" EP
