= Blind Boy Fuller =

American blues guitarist and singer (1904–1941)

- Studio portrait of Fuller

Background information
- Born: Fulton Allen; July 10, 1904; Wadesboro, North Carolina, U.S.
- Died: February 13, 1941 (aged 36) Durham, North Carolina, U.S.
- Genres: Country blues; Piedmont blues; East Coast blues
- Instruments: Guitar; vocals
- Years active: 1928–1940

Fulton Allen (July 10, 1904 – February 13, 1941), known as Blind Boy Fuller, was an American blues guitarist and singer. Fuller was one of the most popular of the recorded Piedmont blues artists, along with Blind Blake, Josh White, and Buddy Moss.

== Life and career ==
Allen was born in Wadesboro, North Carolina, United States, one of ten children of Calvin Allen and Mary Jane Walker. Most sources date his birth to 1907, but the researchers Bob Eagle and Eric LeBlanc indicate 1904. After his mother died, he moved with his father to Rockingham, North Carolina. As a boy he learned to play the guitar and also learned from older singers the field hollers, country rags, traditional songs and blues popular in poor rural areas.

He married young, to Cora Allen, and worked as a laborer. He began to lose his eyesight in his teens. According to the researcher Bruce Bastin, "While he was living in Rockingham he began to have trouble with his eyes. He went to see a doctor in Charlotte who allegedly told him that he had ulcers behind his eyes, the original damage having been caused by some form of snow-blindness." Only the first part of this diagnosis was correct. A 1937 eye examination attributed his vision loss to the long-term effects of untreated neonatal conjunctivitis.

By 1928 he was completely blind. He turned to whatever employment he could find as a singer and entertainer, often playing in the streets. By studying the records of country blues players like Blind Blake and live performances by Gary Davis, Allen became a formidable guitarist, playing on street corners and at house parties in Winston-Salem, North Carolina; Danville, Virginia; and then Durham, North Carolina. In Durham, playing around the tobacco warehouses, he developed a local following that included guitarists Floyd Council and Richard Trice, harmonica player Saunders Terrell (better known as Sonny Terry), and washboard player and guitarist George Washington.

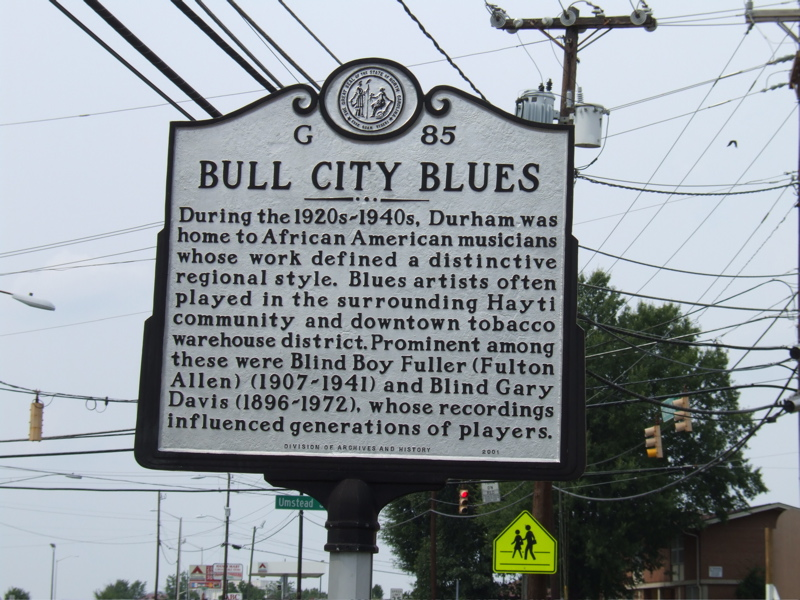
Bull City Blues historical marker, Durham, North Carolina

In 1935, James Baxter Long, a record store manager and talent scout in Burlington, North Carolina, secured Allen a recording session with the American Recording Company (ARC). Allen, Davis, and Washington recorded several tracks in New York City, including the traditional "Rag, Mama, Rag". To promote the records, Long credited Allen as Blind Boy Fuller and Washington as Bull City Red.

Over the next five years Fuller recorded over 120 sides, released by several labels. His singing style was rough and direct, and his lyrics were explicit and uninhibited, drawing on every aspect of his experience as an underprivileged, blind black man on the streets—pawnshops, jailhouses, sickness, death—with an honesty that lacked sentimentality. Although he was not sophisticated, his artistry as a folk singer lay in the honesty and integrity of his self-expression. His songs expressed desire, love, jealousy, disappointment, menace, and humor.

In April 1936, Fuller recorded ten solo performances and also recorded with guitarist Floyd Council. In 1937, after auditioning for J. Mayo Williams, he recorded for Decca Records, but then reverted to ARC. Later that year he made his first recordings with Sonny Terry.

In 1938, Fuller, who was described as having a fiery temper, was imprisoned for shooting a pistol at his wife, wounding her in the leg. His imprisonment prevented him from performing in "From Spirituals to Swing", a concert produced by John Hammond in New York City that year. Sonny Terry performed in his place; it was the beginning of Terry's long career in folk music. After Fuller was released from prison, he held his last two recording sessions in New York City in June 1940, but by then he was increasingly physically weak, and much of the material lacked the quality and energy of his earlier recordings.

Fuller's repertoire included a number of popular double-entendre "hokum" songs, such as "I Want Some of Your Pie", "Truckin' My Blues Away" (1936) (the inspiration for Robert Crumb's comic "Keep On Truckin'"), "Let Me Squeeze Your Lemon", and "Get Your Yas Yas Out" (1938) (adapted as Get Yer Ya-Ya's Out for a Rolling Stones album title), and the autobiographical "Big House Bound", about his time in prison. Much of his material was culled from traditional folk and blues songs. He had a formidable fingerpicking guitar style. He played a steel National resonator guitar. Some criticized Fuller as derivative, but his fusion of elements of traditional and contemporary songs attracted a broad audience. He was an expressive vocalist and masterly guitarist, best remembered for his up-tempo ragtime hits, including "Step It Up and Go". He was also capable of deeper material; his versions of "Lost Lover Blues", "Rattlesnakin' Daddy", and "Mamie" are as deep as most Delta blues.

== Death ==
Fuller underwent a suprapubic cystostomy in July 1940, probably due to the urethral stricture noted on his death certificate, a narrowing or blockage of the urethra that can be caused by syphilitic chancres, gonorrhea, or chlamydia, but continued to require medical treatment. He died at his home in Durham, North Carolina, on February 13, 1941. The cause of death was pyemia, due to an infected bladder, gastrointestinal tract, and perineum, plus kidney failure.

He was so popular when he died that his protégé, Brownie McGhee, recorded "The Death of Blind Boy Fuller" for Okeh Records, and then reluctantly began a short-lived career as Blind Boy Fuller No. 2, so that Columbia Records could profit from Fuller's popularity.

== Grave location ==
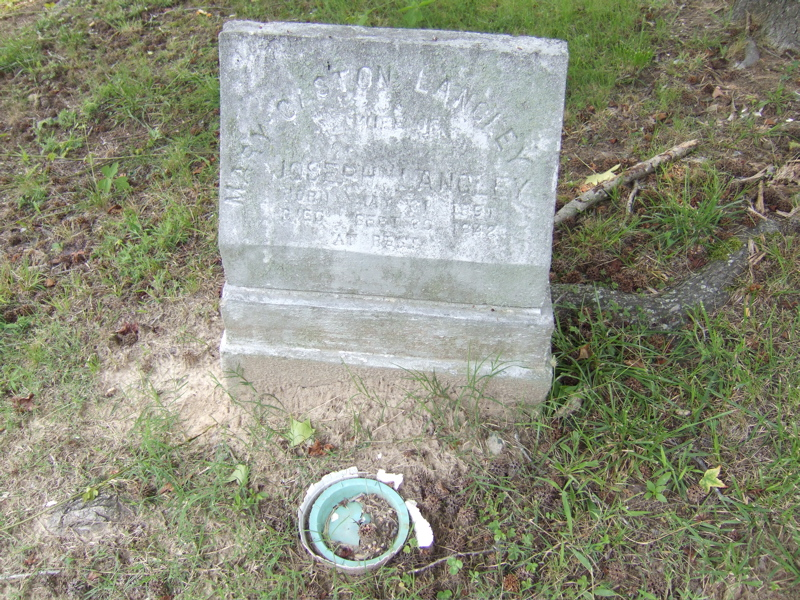
The only remaining stone at Grove Hill Cemetery

Fuller's grave is Grove Hill Cemetery, on private property in Durham. According to state records, this was once an official cemetery, and Fuller's interment is recorded. Only one headstone remains, that of one Mary Caston Langey. The funeral arrangements were handled by McLaurin Funeral Home of Durham, and the burial took place on February 15, 1941.

Fuller has been recognized with two plaques in Durham. The North Carolina Division of Archives and History placed a plaque a few miles north of Fuller's gravesite, along Fayetteville St. The city of Durham officially recognized Fuller on July 16, 2001, with a commemorative plaque along the American Tobacco Trail, adjacent to the property containing Fuller's unmarked grave (several hundred feet east of Fayetteville St.).

== Posthumous recognition ==
Blind Boy Fuller and Reverend Gary Davis were the Sesquicentennial Honors Commission's two main honorees at the Durham 150 Closing Ceremony in Durham on November 2, 2019. They were recognized for their contributions to the Piedmont blues. Fuller's influence is acknowledged by many rock artists whose styles draw from the blues, including the Rolling Stones, Rory Gallagher, and Eric Clapton. Syd Barrett of Pink Floyd named the band after seeing the names of blues singers Pink Anderson and Floyd Council in the liner notes of a 1962 album by Fuller (Philips BBL-7512).
