= Melotone Records =

American record label

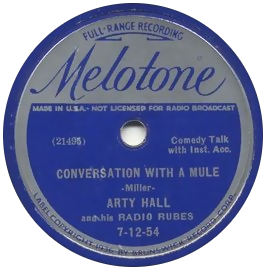
- Melotone Record “Conversation With A Mule” By Arty Hall (1937)
- Parent company: Warner Bros.
- Founded: 1930
- Founder: Warner Bros.
- Defunct: 1938
- Status: Defunct
- Genre: Jazz, pop
- Country of origin: U.S.

Melotone Records was an American record label founded in 1930. Warner/Brunswick Records introduced the Melotone label in the U.S. and Canada as a budget subsidiary issuing 78 rpm disc records. It then became part of the American Record Corporation collection of labels in 1932. The original price was 50 cents, but was reduced to 35 cents or 3 for a $1.00 by 1932. The label was disestablished in 1938. In 2010, Melotone Records was refounded as a division of Melotone Music LLC.

During the Depression, Melotone Records was a commonly found, popular label. Melotone issued popular dance tunes of the era; usually featuring a group of studio musicians issued under pseudonyms, such as Ralph Bennett and his Seven Aces (all eleven), Bob Causer and his Cornellians, Owen Fallon and his Orchestra, Sleepy Hall and his Collegians, Vic Irwin and his Orchestra, Chick Bullock and his Levee Loungers, Vincent Rose and his Orchestra, Paul Small and his Orchestra, et al. Most of the top notch New York area musicians recorded for the label, including The Dorsey Brothers, Bunny Berigan, Joe Venuti, Jack Teagarden, Benny Goodman and many others. Working orchestras such as Hal Kemp under the pseudonym Carolina Club Orchestra, as well as the bands under the direction of Will Osborne, Joe Haymes, Gene Kardos, Nye Mayhew, Nye Mayhew, Anthony Trini, Rudy Vallee, and dozens of others recorded for the label.

The label also issued a variety of jazz and blues recordings, including those by Lucille Bogan (as Bessie Jackson), Big Bill Broonzy, Josh White, and Buddy Moss; plus country, Mexican, Cajun, and Hawaiian music.

Artists on Melotone included Eddie Cantor, Annette Hanshaw, Lead Belly, Blind Boy Fuller, Gene Autry, and Tex Ritter.

== See also ==
- List of record labels
- Melotone Records (Australia)
