= Frazey Ford =

Canadian singer-songwriter and actress

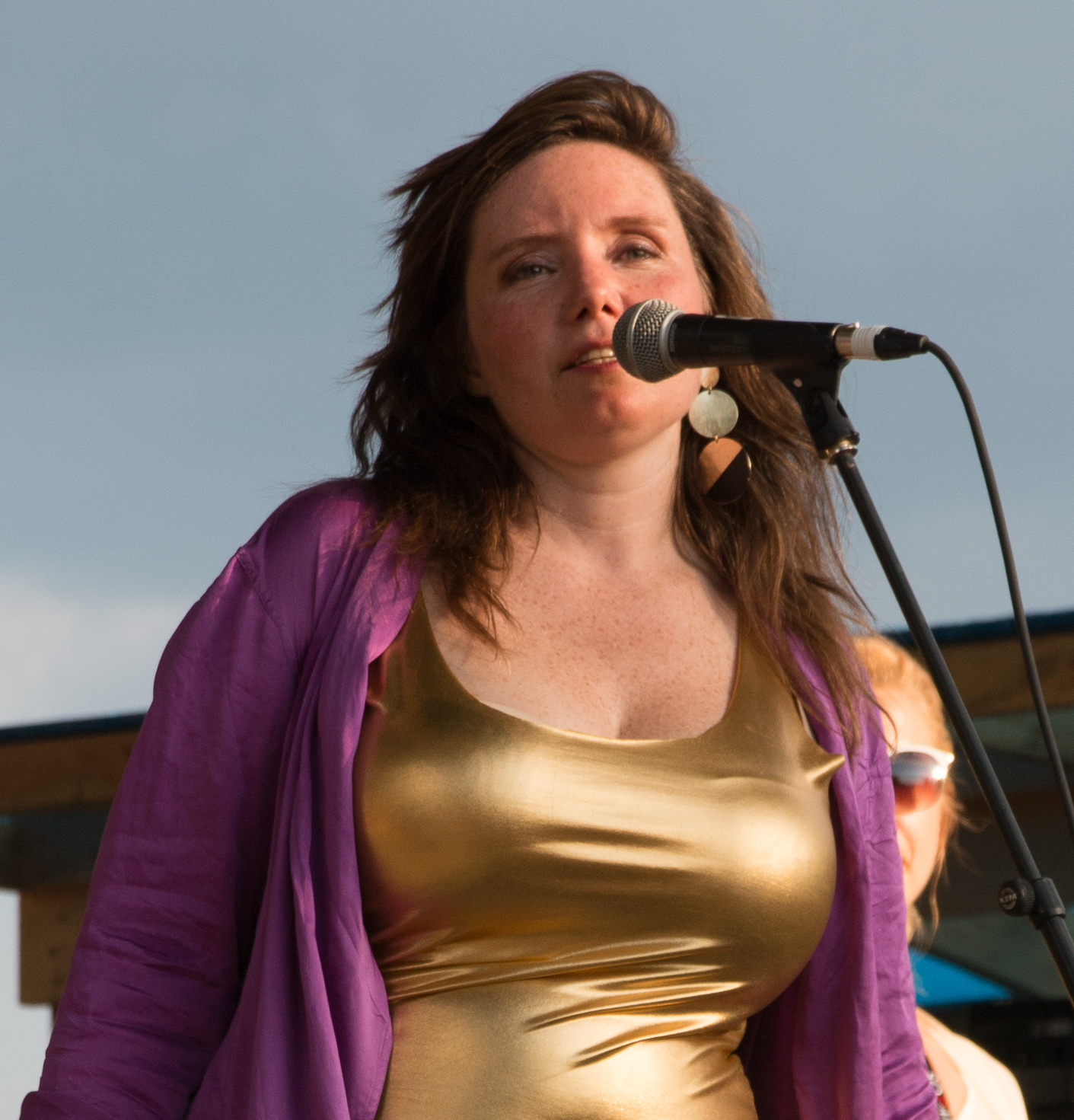
- Ford performing in 2015

Background information
- Origin: East Vancouver, British Columbia, Canada
- Genres: Americana, soul
- Years active: 2001–present
- Label: Nettwerk
- Website: frazeyford.com

Frazey Obadiah Ford (born February 11, 1973) is a Canadian singer-songwriter and actress. She joined the Be Good Tanyas in their first year. Her solo debut Obadiah was released on Nettwerk on July 20, 2010.

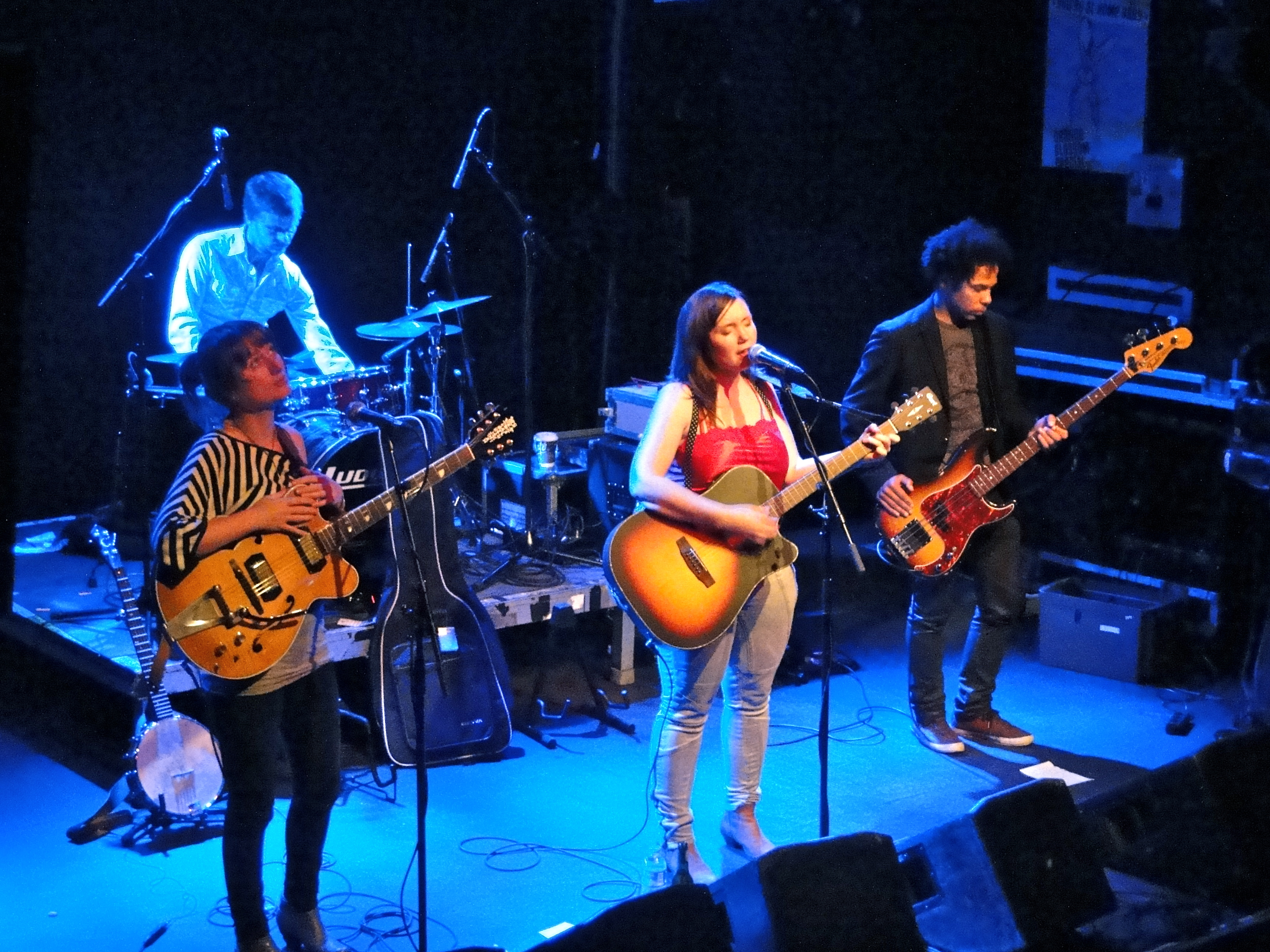
Frazey Ford performing live in Germany, 2011

Jenny Charlesworth of The Georgia Straight wrote that a few of the songs "swing with a mellow neo-soul beat enlivened by buttery vocals", and noted influences from rhythm and blues singers Ann Peebles, Roberta Flack, and Donny Hathaway. Ford also credits her free-spirited parents (her father was an American conscientious objector who moved to Canada), and being a mother has had a strong influence on her songwriting.

Obadiah takes its name from Ford's middle name, Obadiah. When she was born, her parents asked her brothers to choose her middle name; they decided to name her after their pet cat Obadiah that had recently run away.

Ford was raised in Castlegar, British Columbia. She currently resides in Vancouver.

== Discography ==
- Obadiah (2010)
- Indian Ocean (2014)
- U Kin B the Sun (2020)

== Filmography ==
- The L Word (TV episode, 2006) as Sister Christine
- The Christmas Calendar (2017) as Ivy
