= List of Piedmont blues musicians =

The Piedmont blues (also known as Piedmont fingerstyle) is a type of blues music, characterized by a unique fingerpicking method on the guitar in which a regular, alternating-thumb bassline pattern supports a melody using the treble strings. The result is comparable in sound to ragtime or stride piano styles. The Piedmont blues originated in an area including and extending beyond the Piedmont plateau of the eastern United States, which stretches from about Richmond, Virginia, to Atlanta, Georgia. Piedmont blues musicians come from this area and also from Maryland, Delaware, West Virginia, Pennsylvania and Florida. Piedmont blues was popular in the early 20th century.

Below is a list of Piedmont blues musicians.

== A ==
- Pink Anderson (February 12, 1900 – October 12, 1974). Born in Laurens, South Carolina, Anderson was an early country blues guitarist and singer who performed Piedmont blues. He recorded in the late 1920s with the guitarist and singer Blind Simmie Dooley, from Greenville, South Carolina. Anderson had a long career as a medicine show performer. Interest in him was renewed by blues revivalists in the 1960s, and many of his recordings from that time have been released by Prestige Records.

== B ==
- Memphis Willie B. (November 4, 1911 – October 5, 1993). Memphis blues and Piedmont blues guitarist, harmonica player, singer and songwriter.
- Etta Baker (March 31, 1913 – September 23, 2006). Born in Caldwell County, North Carolina, Baker was a country blues guitarist, banjo player and singer who performed Piedmont blues. In the 1990s she released two solo albums, one for Rounder Records. In 2004 Music Maker Records released some recordings she made with Taj Mahal in 1956 and 1998.
- Willie Baker (dates unknown). Baker recorded a number of sides, probably eight, in January and March 1929 in Richmond, Indiana for Gennett Records. He played a twelve-string guitar in a frailing style to back his strong vocals.
- Barbecue Bob (September 11, 1902 – October 21, 1931). Guitarist and singer.
- Ed Bell (May 1905 – 1960, 1965 or 1966). Born in Fort Deposit, Alabama, Bell released work under his own name and as Sluefoot Joe and Barefoot Bill from Alabama.
- Scrapper Blackwell (February 21, 1903 – October 27, 1962). Born Francis Hillman Blackwell in Syracuse, Darlington County, South Carolina, he performed acoustic Piedmont blues and was an early exponent of Chicago blues. He worked closely with the pianist Leroy Carr also backed the singer Black Bottom McPhail. Document Records has issued most of his work in three volumes.
- Blind Blake (1896 – December 1, 1934). Born in Newport News, Virginia, Blake was a guitarist and singer who played in a range of musical styles. He performed early ragtime on guitar, Piedmont blues, country blues, Delta blues and Chicago blues. A musician of great influence, he recorded frequently for Paramount Records.
- Gabriel Brown (September 2, 1910 – May 7, 1960). Born in Florida, Brown was a country blues guitarist and singer. He was discovered in the 1930s by the folk music researchers Zora Neale Hurston and Alan Lomax and had a career lasting several decades, mainly in New York City, recording for Joe Davis.
- Precious Bryant (January 4, 1942 – January 12, 2013). Born in Talbot County, Georgia, Bryant was recorded by the music historian George Mitchell in 1969, in one of his field recordings of folk blues. She subsequently appeared at blues festivals and, late in life, recorded two albums for Terminus Records.

== C ==
- Carolina Slim (Edward P. Harris, August 22, 1923 – October 22, 1953). Guitarist and singer.
- Cephas & Wiggins (John Cephas, September 4, 1930 – March 4, 2009; and Phil Wiggins, born May 8, 1954). Guitarist and harmonica player, respectively, who performed as a duo.
- Virgil Childers (c. 1901 – December 10, 1939) Guitarist and singer, who was recorded in 1938.
- Jaybird Coleman (May 20, 1896 – January 28, 1950). Born in Gainesville, Alabama, Coleman was a country blues harmonica player, guitarist and singer who performed early Piedmont blues and harmonica blues, active mostly in the 1930s.
- Elizabeth Cotten (January 5, 1893 – June 29, 1987). Singer, songwriter, and guitarist.
- Floyd Council (September 2, 1911 – May 9, 1976). Guitarist and singer.

== D ==
- Reverend Gary Davis (April 30, 1896 – May 5, 1972). Blues and gospel singer and guitarist.

== E ==
- Archie Edwards (September 4, 1918 – June 18, 1998). Born in Union Hall, Virginia, he released Blues 'n Bones in 1989.

== F ==
- Turner Foddrell (June 22, 1928 – January 31, 1995). Acoustic guitarist, singer and songwriter.
- Frank Fotusky. Guitarist and singer. He plays six- and twelve-string acoustic guitar, and regularly performs in the Greater Portland area. Fotusky plays acoustic blues in the Piedmont style reminiscent of guitarists such as Reverend Gary Davis, Blind Boy Fuller, John Jackson and Blind Willie McTell. He has performed or appeared with John Jackson, Paul Geremia, Steve Mann, Will Scarlett, Bonnie Raitt, Buddy Guy and Chris Hillman, amongst others.
- Rick Franklin (born March 16, 1952) Guitarist, singer and songwriter. With various other musicians, Franklin has released four albums to date and works as a blues musicologist.
- Blind Boy Fuller (July 10, 1907 – February 13, 1941). Guitarist and singer.

== H ==
- Boo Hanks (April 30, 1928 – April 15, 2016) Guitarist and singer, he was billed as the last of the Piedmont blues musicians. Hanks recorded two albums in his lifetime, Pickin' Low Cotton (2007) and Buffalo Junction (2012), both released by the Music Maker record label.
- Big Boy Henry (May 26, 1921 – December 5, 2004). Guitarist, singer and songwriter. His most notable recording was "Mr. President", a protest against cuts in social welfare undertaken by Ronald Reagan. It won Henry a W.C. Handy Award in 1983.
- Algia Mae Hinton (August 29, 1929 – February 8, 2018). Born in Johnston County, North Carolina, Hinton was a guitarist and vocalist.
- George Higgs (March 9, 1930 – January 29, 2013). Acoustic guitarist, harmonicist and singer. In 2001, Higgs' debut album, Tarboro Blues, was made in collaboration with the Music Maker Relief Foundation.
- John Dee Holeman (April 4, 1929, Orange County, North Carolina – April 30, 2021) His music includes elements of Texas blues, R&B and African-American string-band music. In his younger days he was also known for his proficiency as a buckdancer.
- Frank Hovington (January 9, 1919 – June 21, 1982). Guitar and banjo player and singer.
- Peg Leg Howell (March 5, 1888 – August 11, 1968). Guitarist and singer who spent most of his career in Atlanta, Georgia, and recorded for Columbia Records from 1926 until 1929, and then fell into obscurity. In 1963 he was "rediscovered" in dire poverty in Atlanta by George Mitchell and Roger Brown. They recorded Howell at the age of 75; the recordings were issued on LP by Testament Records, thirty-four years after his last recorded sessions.

== J ==
- Bo Weavil Jackson (dates of birth and death unknown). Guitarist and singer who recorded for Paramount Records and Vocalion Records in 1926, one of the earliest bluesmen to be recorded.
- John Jackson (February 24, 1924 – January 20, 2002). His first recordings were released in the early 1960s by Arhoolie Records.
- Henry "Rufe" Johnson (October 2, 1908 – February 4, 1974). Guitarist, harmonica player, pianist, banjo player, singer and songwriter who found fame late in life following the release of his album, The Union County Flash! (1973).
- Luke Jordan (January 28, 1892 – June 25, 1952). Born in Bluefield, West Virginia, Jordan was a country blues guitarist who played in the Piedmont blues and East Coast blues styles. He spent most of his career in Lynchburg, Virginia.

== L ==
- Charley Lincoln (March 11, 1900 – September 28, 1963). Born Charlie Hicks in Lithonia, Georgia, he was an acoustic country and Piedmont blues guitarist and vocalist. He was the older brother of Robert "Barbecue Bob" Hicks, with whom he performed from the 1920s until Robert's early death in 1931. Charley Lincoln continued to perform until the mid-1950s. He made several recordings, some for Columbia Records.

== M ==
- Carl Martin (April 1, 1906 – May 10, 1979). Multi-instrumentalist and singer.
- Sara Martin (June 18, 1884 – May 24, 1955). Singer. She was possibly the first to record the blues song "'T'aint Nobody's Bus'ness if I Do", with Fats Waller on piano, in 1922.
- Brownie McGhee (November 30, 1915 – February 16, 1996). Folk music and Piedmont blues singer and guitarist, best known for his collaboration with the harmonica player Sonny Terry.
- Blind Willie McTell (May 5, 1898 – August 19, 1959). Piedmont blues and ragtime singer and guitarist. His most notable song was "Statesboro Blues", which has been covered by several musicians.
- Kid Prince Moore (Active 1936 – 1938). Guitarist and singer, who recorded 17 songs from 1936 to 1938.
- William Moore (March 3, 1893 – November 22, 1951). Guitarist and singer. Described as "a facile, brilliant, and unusual guitarist", his style bridged ragtime and blues.
- Buddy Moss (January 16, 1914 – October 19, 1984). Guitarist and singer. He is considered one of the most influential East Coast blues guitarists to record in the period between Blind Blake's final sessions in 1932 and Blind Boy Fuller's debut in 1935.

== P ==
- Charlie Parr (born 1967). Minnesota-based roots musician, Parr is influenced by earlier blues and folk traditions. Inspired by the music of Charley Patton, Lead Belly, Reverend Gary Davis, and Woody Guthrie, Parr's rural surroundings are reflected in his musical style.
- Dan Pickett (August 31, 1907 – August 16, 1967). Born James Founty, he was a Piedmont blues and country blues singer, guitarist and songwriter. He recorded fourteen tracks for Gotham Records in 1949, several of which have been issued more recently. AllMusic noted that "Pickett had a distinctive rhythmic style and unique phrasing that makes his records compelling decades after his release".

== Q ==
- Doug Quattlebaum (January 22, 1929 – March 1, 1996) A guitarist, singer and songwriter, he recorded one single for Gotham Records in 1953, but bizarrely was offered another opportunity following his employment as an ice cream salesman.

== R ==
- Michael Roach (born March 18, 1955, Washington, D.C., United States) is an American expatriate blues performer and educator, who has released six albums on the independent Stella Records label.

== T ==
- Baby Tate (January 28, 1916 – August 17, 1972). Guitarist who released his only album, Blues of Baby Tate: See What You Done Done, in 1962, and twelve months later appeared in Samuel Charters's documentary film The Blues.
- Sonny Terry (October 24, 1911 – March 11, 1986). Piedmont blues and folk harmonica player.
- Too Tight Henry (1899 – August 16, 1971). Guitarist and singer, who was associated with Blind Blake and Blind Lemon Jefferson.
- Valerie Turner. A latter day guitarist, vocalist, educator, and author, Turner plays in the Piedmont style of fingerpicking guitar, continuing in the traditions of Mississippi John Hurt, Elizabeth Cotten, Memphis Minnie, and Etta Baker.

== W ==
- Curley Weaver (March 25, 1906 – September 20, 1962). Guitarist and singer.
- Lightnin' Wells. A multi-instrumentalist and singer who has released six albums to date.
- Josh White (February 11, 1914 – September 5, 1969). Singer, guitarist, songwriter, actor, and civil rights activist.
- Phil Wiggins (born May 8, 1954). Harmonica player.
- Warner Williams. (died September 2021) AllMusic stated that he and Jay Summerour "specialized in the Piedmont blues tradition of Sonny Terry & Brownie McGhee, billing themselves on the folk and blues circuit as Little Bit of Blues."
- Ralph Willis (1910 – June 11, 1957). Piedmont blues and country blues singer, guitarist and songwriter.
- Blind Willie Walker (April 1896 – March 4, 1933). Guitarist, singer and songwriter.

== See also ==
- List of blues musicians
- List of Chicago blues musicians
- List of country blues musicians
