= Music of Georgia (U.S. state) =

Georgia in United States

Georgia's musical history is diverse and substantial; the state's musicians include Southern rap groups such as Outkast and Goodie Mob, as well as a wide variety of rock, pop, blues, and country artists such as Ray Charles, Otis Redding, James Brown, The Allman Brothers Band, Ray Stevens, Bill Anderson, Thomas Rhett, Jason Aldean, Wet Willie, Chuck Leavell, Cole Swindell, Little Richard, Charles Kelley and Dave Haywood (Lady A) and Buddy Greene, Alan Jackson, Jennifer Nettles and Kristian Bush (Sugarland) and many others.

The music of Athens, Georgia is associated with college rock including bands such as R.E.M., The B-52's, and Pylon.

== Music institutions ==
The state's official music museum is the Georgia Music Hall of Fame, located in Macon, Georgia from 1996 until it closed in 2011. Colleges such as the University of Georgia and Columbus State University have extensive music departments.

== Folk music ==
Georgia's folk musical traditions include important contributions to the Piedmont blues, shape note singing, and African-American music.

=== African American folk music ===
The "ring shout" is an African American musical and dance tradition that is among the oldest surviving African American performance styles in North America. The ring shout tradition is rare in the modern Southern United States, but it still found in McIntosh County, Georgia, where black communities have kept the style alive. The McIntosh County ring shout is a counterclockwise ring dance featuring clapping and stick-beating percussion with call-and-response vocals. The ring shout tradition is strongest in Boldon, Georgia (also known as Briar Patch), where it is traditionally performed on New Year's Eve.

The Georgia Sea Island Singers are an important group in modern African American folk music in Georgia. They perform worldwide the Gullah/Geechee music of the Georgia coast and Sea Islands, and have been touring since the early 1900s; the folklorist and musicologist Alan Lomax discovered the Singers on a 1959-60 collecting trip and helped to bring their music to new audiences. The Georgia Sea Island Singers have included Bessie Jones, Emma Ramsey, John Davis, Mayble Hillery, and Peter Davis.

Fife and drum blues has been documented in west central Georgia.

The Freedom Singers are a group that formed in 1962 in Albany to educate communities about issues related to the Civil Rights Movement through song.

Multi-instrumentalist Abner Jay, born in Fitzgerald, performed eccentric blues-infused folk music as a one-man band.

=== Shape-note ===
The Sacred Harp, first published in 1844, was compiled and produced by Georgians Benjamin Franklin White and Elisha J. King. They helped establish a singing tradition also known as Sacred Harp, fasola, or shape note singing. The Sacred Harp system uses notes represented by different shapes according to scale degree, intended to make it easy for people to learn to sight-read music and perform complex pieces without a lot of training. Established in 1933, the Sacred Harp Publishing Company, located in Carrollton, Georgia, publishes the most widely used 1991 edition of The Sacred Harp. Hugh McGraw of Bremen, Georgia, served as the company's executive secretary from 1958 to 2002 and helped encourage Sacred Harp's recent resurgence in popularity. A Georgia-based music label, Bibletone Records, has reissued a 28-cut CD of Sacred Harp music originally released as LPs by the publishing company.

=== American folk music revival ===
Folksinger/songwriter Hedy West, active in the American folk music revival and famous for her song "500 Miles", was born in Cartersville.

== Popular music ==
=== Country ===
In Atlanta, on June 14, 1923, the country music recording industry was launched when Fiddlin' John Carson made his first phonograph record for Okeh Records Company representative Polk C. Brockman. Carson's recordings of "The Little Old Log Cabin in the Lane" and "The Old Hen Cackled and the Rooster's Going to Crow" sold over 500,000 copies and opened the eyes of record company executives to the market for "old-time" country music. Along with Carson, Gid Tanner and the Skillet Lickers and Georgia Yellow Hammers made Atlanta and North Georgia an early center of old-time string band music.

In the 1960s, guitarist Chet Atkins, born in Luttrell, Tennessee but raised in Hamilton, Georgia, drew on jazz and pop music to help create the smoother country music style known as the Nashville Sound, expanding country music's appeal to adult pop fans. Country music superstars Alan Jackson, Trisha Yearwood, and Travis Tritt are natives of Georgia. Other successful country music acts from Georgia include Norman Blake, Jerry Reed, Brenda Lee (who had two #1 Hot 100 hits with "I'm Sorry" in 1960 and "Rockin' Around the Christmas Tree"), Billy Currington, Cyndi Thomson, Jennifer Nettles of Sugarland, Daryle Singletary, Doug Stone, John Berry, Rhett Akins, Mark Wills, the Zac Brown Band, and Lady Antebellum, as well as up and coming stars Jason Aldean, Daniel Antopolsky, Brantley Gilbert, Luke Bryan, Thomas Rhett, Cole Swindell (attended Georgia Southern University), Kip Moore, Lauren Alaina, and Jessie James. Other notable country musicians from Georgia include Corey Smith (graduated from UGA) and Tabby Crabb from Sumter Co., who worked with the original Urban Cowboy Band, Randy Howard, Hank Cochran, Keith Urban, and many others in the Nashville style. Georgia country music superstars with a #1 album on the Billboard 200 chart include Atlanta-area musicians Alan Jackson with 3 #1 albums like Drive in 2002, and Zac Brown Band with 3 like You Get What You Give in 2010 (Zac Brown attended the University of West Georgia); Jason Aldean with 4 consecutive #1 albums on the Billboard 200 like the country rock Night Train in 2012 to 2018 (Aldean also had a #1 Hot 100 song "Try That in a Small Town" in 2023, Luke Bryan (from south Georgia, he attended Georgia Southern University) with 3 like Crash My Party in 2013, Thomas Rhett with 2 like Life Changes in 2017, and Sugarland with 2 #1 albums like The Incredible Machine in 2010.

=== Blues ===
Ma Rainey, from Columbus, was among the earliest professional blues singers and one of the first generation of such singers to record. Piedmont blues artist Blind Willie McTell was born in Thomson. Country blues singer and guitarist Peg Leg Howell was born in Eatonton. Singer Ida Cox was from Toccoa. Singer and guitarist Kokomo Arnold was born in Lovejoy's Station. Singer Lucille Hegamin was born in Macon. Singer Trixie Smith was born in Atlanta. Blues pianists from Georgia include Thomas A. Dorsey, born in Villa Rica, Big Maceo Merriweather, born in Atlanta, and Piano Red, born near Hampton. Barbeque Bob was from Walnut Grove. Singer and guitarist Curley Weaver was born in Covington. Charley Lincoln was born in Lithonia. Harmonicist Eddie Mapp was born in Social Circle. Harmonicist Sonny Terry was born in Greesboro. Buddy Moss was born in Jewell. Singer and guitarist Blind Simmie Dooley was born in Hartwell. Songwriter and one-man band Jesse Fuller was born in Jonesboro. Bumble Bee Slim was born in Brunswick. Country blues artist Precious Bryant was born in Talbot County. Jump blues singer and musician Billy Wright was born in Atlanta. Singer and guitarist Robert Cray was born in Columbus. Singer and guitarist Cecil Barfield was born in Bronwood. Macon, Georgia street performer Pearly Brown was born in Wilcox County, Georgia.

=== Jazz ===
Big band swing bandleader and pianist Fletcher Henderson and his younger brother arranger Horace Henderson were born in Cuthbert. Stride pianist and composer Mary Lou Williams, avant-garde jazz alto saxophonist Marion Brown, and singer Jean Carne were born in Atlanta. Big band bandleader and trumpet player Harry James was born in Albany. Bebop saxophonist James Moody, hard bop saxophonist Sahib Shihab, and singer Irene Reid were born in Savannah. Trombonist J.C. Higginbotham was born in Social Circle. Tenor saxophonist and arranger Teddy McRae was born in Waycross. George Adams was born in Covington. Singer Joe Williams was born in Cordele. Bebop saxophonist for Miles Davis and The Jazz Messengers, Hank Mobley was born in Eastman. Jazz bassist Jimmy Garrison who performed with John Coltrane, Alice Coltrane, and Ornette Coleman was born in Americus. The jazz fusion group Aquarium Rescue Unit founded by Bruce Hampton was started in Atlanta.

=== Rhythm and blues ===
Augusta native James Brown (d.2006) and Macon native Little Richard (d.2020) "The Architect of Rock and Roll" started performing in Georgia clubs on the Chitlin' Circuit, fused gospel with blues and boogie-woogie to lay the foundations for rock & roll and soul music, and rank among the most iconic musicians of the 20th century. Ray Charles was also born in Georgia; Charles helped to invent the soul genre by borrowing elements of rhythm and blues, country, jazz, gospel, and blues. Ray Charles (d. 2004) had 3 #1 hits on the Billboard Hot 100, including "Georgia on My Mind" in 1960 (which is the official state song of Georgia). Ray Charles won another Grammy for Album of the Year for his 2004 Genius Loves Company. Atlanta native Chuck Willis was a blues, R&B, and rock and roll singer and songwriter active from 1950 to 1958. In the 1960s, Atlanta native Gladys Knight proved one of the most popular Motown recording artists, while Otis Redding, born in the small town of Dawson but raised in Macon, defined the grittier Southern soul sound of Memphis-based Stax Records. Gladys Knight "The Empress of Soul" had a #1 hit on the Billboard Hot 100 with "Midnight Train to Georgia" in 1973. Otis Redding (d. 1967, buried near Macon) had a #1 hit on the Hot 100 with "(Sittin' on) the Dock of the Bay" in 1968. Motown producer and disco artist Hamilton Bohannon was born in Newnan, Georgia. Dave Prater of the soul duo Sam & Dave was born in Ocilla, Georgia.

=== Rock ===
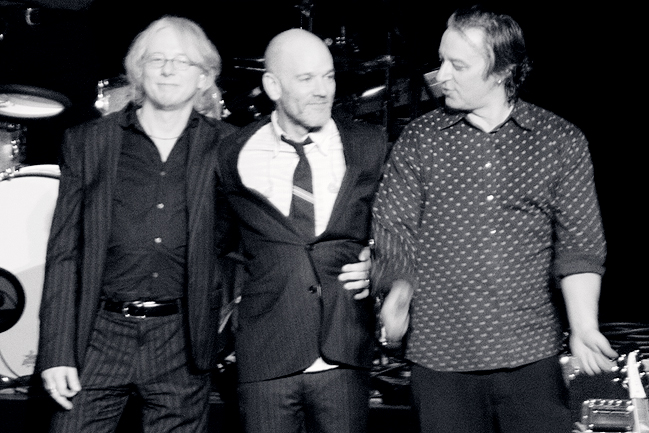
Rock and Roll Hall of Fame inductees R.E.M.

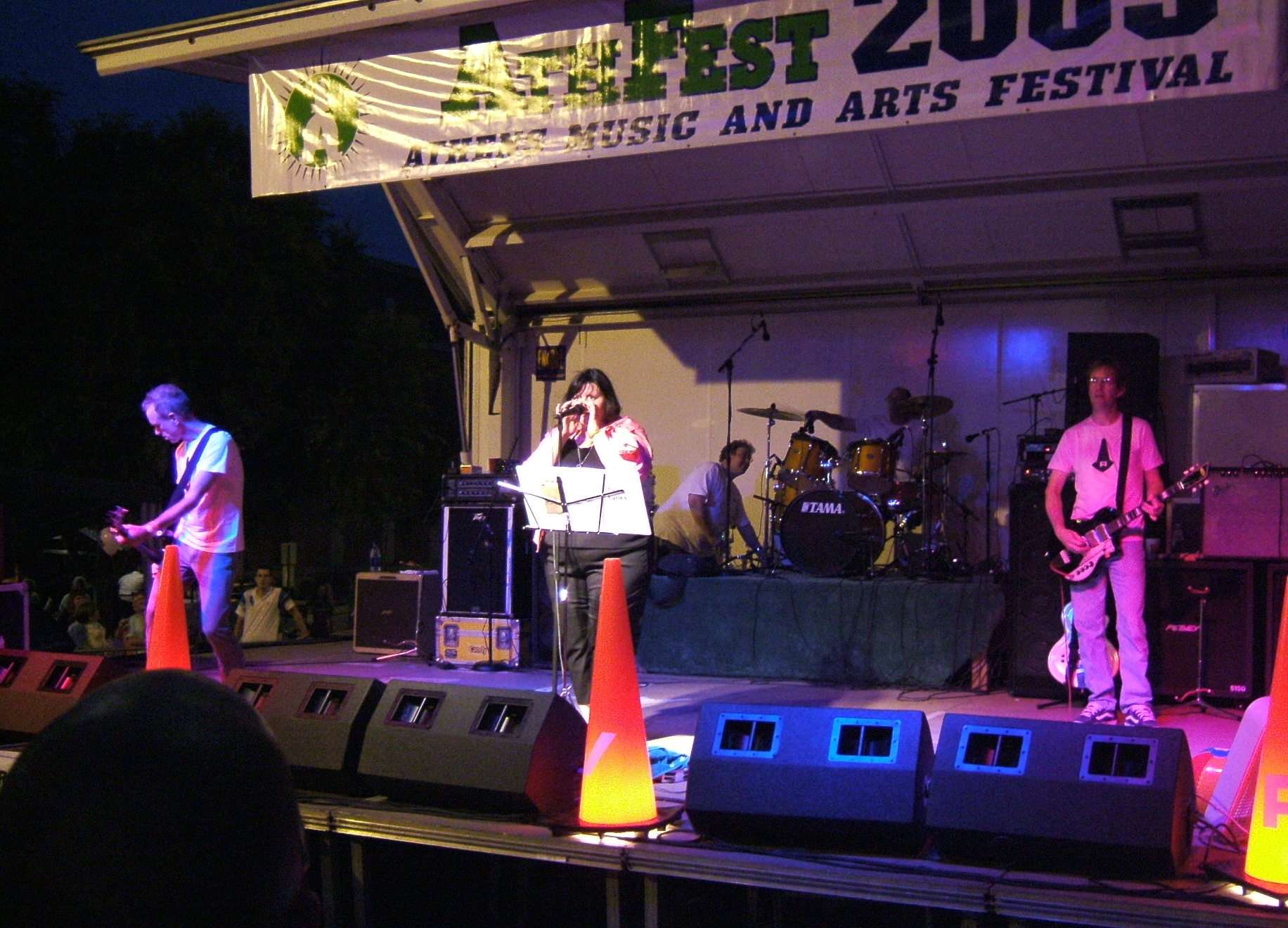
Pylon at Athfest 2005

The earliest Atlanta-based music maven, Bill Lowery, started the careers of Ray Stevens, Joe South, Jerry Reed, and countless others, and created the first Georgia-based springboard for such talent, National Recording Corporation, sporting not only a record label, but a recording studio and pressing plant. Lowery would later work with the likes of Billy Joe Royal, Mac Davis, Dennis Yost & The Classics IV, and The Atlanta Rhythm Section, giving Atlanta national relevance with his Lowery Music group of publishing companies, one of the world's biggest music publishers. Noted session and touring drummer, Michael Huey, started his career at Bill Lowery studios.

Tommy Roe, from Atlanta, had 2 #1 Hot 100 hits, including "Dizzy" in 1969.

The Allman Brothers Band, founded in Jacksonville, Florida, moved to Macon at the urging of their manager, Phil Walden, who had previously managed Otis Redding. The Allman Brothers had a #2 hit on the Billboard Hot 100 with "Ramblin' Man" in 1973. Their album Brothers and Sisters went to #1 on the Billboard 200. Gregg Allman (d. 2017), his brother Duane Allman (d. 1971), and Berry Oakley (d. 1972) are buried in Macon. Walden's Macon-based Capricorn Records, spearheaded the rise of Southern rock, and the success of the Allman Brothers paved the way for other Southern rock bands, including Atlanta Rhythm Section, South Carolina-based Marshall Tucker Band and Lynyrd Skynyrd, also founded in Jacksonville. Georgia has also produced a number of Southern rock groups throughout the last three decades, including the Black Crowes (who had a #1 album on the Billboard 200 in 1992), The Georgia Satellites (had a #2 Hot 100 hit with Keep Your Hands to Yourself in '87), Blackberry Smoke, Confederate Railroad, and Drivin' 'N' Cryin'.

The city of Athens, Georgia, home to the University of Georgia, has been a fertile field for alternative rock bands since the late 1970s. Notable bands from Athens include R.E.M., The B-52's, Widespread Panic, Drive-By Truckers, Cartel, Of Montreal, and Dead Confederate. Athens is also home to the Elephant 6 Recording Company, an indie collective whose members include The Apples in Stereo and Neutral Milk Hotel. R.E.M. had 2 #1 albums on the Billboard 200: Out of Time in 1991 and Monster in 1994. R.E.M. had 6 #1 songs on the Alternative Songs chart in the late 80s and 90s. Michael Stipe attended the University of Georgia.

Acoustic rock/folk duo the Indigo Girls got their start in Decatur (they both attended Emory University in Atlanta, and alternative rock bands Collective Soul (had 7 #1 songs on the Mainstream Rock chart in the 90s) and September Hase began in Stockbridge and Tifton, respectively. Rock pianist Elton John spends some time living in Atlanta, and singer-songwriter John Mayer ("Why Georgia") lived in Atlanta after dropping out of the Berklee School of Music in 1998. Indie rock and hard rock band Manchester Orchestra had a #13 album on the Billboard 200 in 2014 with Cope.

Georgia has contributed to the ska scene with the bands Treephort, 50:50 Shot, and The Taj Motel Trio. Ska punk has seen a recent revival in Georgia with the regional ska festival, the Mass Ska Raid, taking place for the first time in 2008.

Along with Louisiana and the rest of the Southern area, there is a strong heavy metal music scene in Georgia, with bands such as Mastodon (had a #6 album on the Billboard 200 in 2014), Baroness, Collective Soul, Royal Thunder, Black Tusk, Kylesa, Withered, Sevendust, ISSUES, Norma Jean, and Attila. Thrash metal band Tetrarch are from Atlanta, as is black metal band Cloak.

Neon Christ are a notable band from the Atlanta Hardcore scene.

Several Christian rock musicians have come out of Georgia, including Amy Grant, who was born in Augusta, Third Day (had a #6 album on the Billboard 200 in 2008), Casting Crowns (had 2 #2 albums on the Billboard 200, in 2007 and 2011), Bebo Norman, and Family Force 5.

Cat Power (Chan Marshall) was born in Atlanta and got her start there.

The 2000s saw the rise of Atlanta indie rock bands The Black Lips, Deerhunter, and The Coathangers.

Pop rock singer songwriter Phillip Phillips, who won the eleventh season of American Idol in 2012, was born in Albany. He had a #4 album on the Billboard 200 in 2012.

The Atlanta International Pop Festival (1970) involved Macon's The Allman Brothers Band.In later decades, Atlanta has hosted the annual 2-day Music Midtown festival since 1994 (Atlanta's Collective Soul played there in 2000 and 2017, Atlanta's Manchester Orchestra in 2011, and Atlanta's Ludacris in 2001 and 2012), Shaky Beats Music Festival (an EDM festival since 2016) and Shaky Knees Music Festival (a 3-day rock festival since 2013), as well as hosting the TomorrowWorld EDM music festival from 2013 to 2015. The city also hosts the EDM Imagine Festival at Atlanta Speedway, as well as the SweetWater 420 Fest in Centennial Olympic Park.

=== Hip hop ===
Atlanta-based OutKast proved one of the first commercially successful hip hop groups from outside of New York or Los Angeles. In the 1990s and 2000s, Atlanta became a leading center of urban music. Artists like Lloyd (had a #2 album on Billboard 200 in 2007), T.I., TLC, Monica, Usher, 112, Ludacris, YoungBloodZ, OutKast, Goodie Mob (Gnarls Barkley with CeeLo Green had a #4 album on Billboard 200 in 2006), and producers such as Organized Noize, L.A. Reid, and Jermaine Dupri, the last of whom founded the successful record labels LaFace and So So Def, have blurred musical boundaries by blending R&B singing with hip hop production. More recently, Atlanta is also known as a center of crunk music, an electric bass-driven club music whose most visible practitioner has been Atlanta-based producer/hype man/rapper Lil Jon.

There have been several Billboard Hot 100 #1 singles in the genre: Kris Kross ("Jump" in 1992), TLC (4 #1s on the Billboard Hot 100, such as "Waterfalls" in 1995), Silk ("Freak Me"), Monica (3 #1s, such as "Angel of Mine" in 1999), Usher (9 #1s), Outkast (3 #1s), Ludacris (5 #1s, including "Stand Up" in 2003), Ciara ("Goodies" in 2004), D4L ("Laffy Taffy" in 2005), Soulja Boy ("Crank That (Soulja Boy)" in 2007), T.I. (3 #1s, including "Whatever You Like" in 2008), B.o.B. ("Nothin' on You" in 2009), Migos ("Bad and Boujee" in 2016), Childish Gambino ("This Is America" in 2018), and Lil Nas X (3 #1s like "Old Town Road" in 2019). Usher also had 4 consecutive #1 albums on the Billboard 200 from Confessions in 2004 to Looking 4 Myself. The R&B group 112 were featured on Puff Daddy's #1 Hot 100 song "I'll Be Missing You" in 1997. Rapper Yung Joc was featured on T-Pain's #1 Hot 100 song "Buy U a Drank". R&B singer Sleepy Brown from Savannah was featured on Outkast's #1 Hot 100 song "The Way You Move" in 2004. Young Thug was featured on Camila Cabello's #1 Hot 100 song "Havana" in 2018. In addition, Atlanta rapper 2 Chainz had a #1 album on the Billboard 200 in 2012: Based on a T.R.U. Story. Future has had 7 consecutive #1 albums on the Billboard 200 including the trap music album DS2 in 2015. 21 Savage from DeKalb County has had 2 #1 albums, including one in 2019. Lil Baby has had 2 #1 albums like in 2020. R&B singer Summer Walker had a #1 album in 2021.

Additional notable musicians from Georgia include: "What Kind of Fool (Do You Think I Am)" from 1964 by R&B group The Tams, "Take Your Time (Do It Right)" '80 by Post-disco group The S.O.S. Band, "Mr. Wendal" '92 by Arrested Development (group), "Whoomp! (There It Is)" '93 by hip hop and Miami bass duo Tag Team, "My Boo" '96 by R&B and Miami bass group Ghost Town DJs, "Da' Dip" '97 by hip hop and Miami bass rapper Freak Nasty, "Bring It All to Me" '99 by R&B girl group Blaque, "Don't Think I'm Not" '00 by r&b singer Kandi (who was in Xscape), "Where the Party At" '01 by hip hop soul group Jagged Edge, "Don't Mess with My Man" '02 by R&B singer Nivea from Savannah, "Georgia" '05 by Southern hip hop group Field Mob, "Watch Me (Whip/Nae Nae)" by Silento in 2015, "Crush" '98 by pop singer Jennifer Paige, "Lullaby" '98 by pop rock singer Shawn Mullins, "Crazy for This Girl" 2000 by pop rock twin brothers Evan and Jaron, "People Are Crazy" '09 by country singer Billy Currington from Savannah, Hey! Album "Freak of the Week" '98 by pop rock band Marvelous 3 (with Butch Walker), "Not an Angel" '07 by Post-hardcore band City Sleeps, "Bartender Song (Sittin' at a Bar)" '08 by rap rock and country rock group Rehab, Sugar "Giving It All Away" 2010 by psychedelic rock band Dead Confederate from Augusta, Southern Gothic "Felicia" from 2010 by psychedelic rock and hip hop band The Constellations, and "Lose Control" (which went to #1 on Billboard Hot 100 in 2024) by Teddy Swims from Conyers.

== Classical ==
Modernist composer Wallingford Riegger was born in Albany. Singer/composer Roland Hayes was born in Curryville. Opera singer Mattiwilda Dobbs was born in Atlanta. Opera singer Jessye Norman is native to Augusta. Opera singer Jamie Barton is from Rome, GA. Composer/arranger Hall Johnson was born in Athens. Composer Lena McLin was born in Atlanta. Famous music director Robert Shaw spent much of his time living in Atlanta directing the Atlanta Symphony Orchestra and Chorus.

Notable Georgian classical groups include the Atlanta Symphony Orchestra, the Atlanta Chamber Players, the Atlanta Symphony Chorus, Atlanta Opera, the Georgia Boy Choir, the Atlanta Boy Choir, Georgia Symphony Orchestra, New Trinity Baroque, the Atlanta Symphony Youth Orchestra, Atlanta Ballet, and the Gwinnett Ballet Theatre, as well as symphonies in the cities of Columbus, Macon, Augusta, and Savannah.

== The Great American Songbook ==
Lyricist Johnny Mercer, whose works include the Academy Award-winning song "On the Atchison, Topeka and the Santa Fe" and other entries in the Great American Songbook of pop music (like "Moon River") standards, is a native of Savannah and buried there. Mercer co-founded Capitol Records.

== See also ==
- Music of Atlanta
- List of songs about Atlanta
- Blind Tom Wiggins
- The Georgia Music Channel http://georgiamusicchannel.com
