= Willie Baker =

American Piedmont blues guitarist singer and songwriter

- Also known as: Steamboat Bill and His Guitar, Willie Jones and His Guitar
- Born: probably Pierce County, Georgia, U.S.
- Genres: Piedmont blues
- Occupations: Guitarist, singer, songwriter
- Instruments: Guitar, vocals
- Years active: 1920s
- Labels: Gennett Records, Supertone Records, Champion Records, Varsity Records

Willie Baker was an American Piedmont blues guitarist, singer and songwriter. He recorded eight tracks, playing a twelve-string guitar to back his own strong vocals. All of his recordings took place in January and March 1929 in Richmond, Indiana, United States. Details of his life outside of his recording career are sketchy.

== Biography ==
It is generally supposed that Baker was born in Pierce County, Georgia, United States, although little is known of his upbringing.

One local peculiarity of the area around Atlanta, Georgia, was the number of twelve-string guitar players that emerged in the 1920s. It is an unusual primary instrument for blues musicians to use; and yet the first recording of a male country blues singer was undertaken by a twelve-string guitarist, Ed Andrews, who recorded for Okeh Records in Atlanta in early 1924. Others who appeared and recorded in the next few years from that same general location, included Willie Baker, Blind Willie McTell, Barbecue Bob, Charley Lincoln, Julius Daniels, and George Carter. The brothers Barbecue Bob (Robert Hicks) and Charley Lincoln (Charlie Hicks), plus Curley Weaver were all taught to play by Curley's mother, Savannah "Dip" Shepard Weaver, a well-respected pianist and guitarist. The manner of Baker's open-tuned guitar work, often using a slide, and style of singing, allied him with the Hicks brothers, although it is pure speculation whether they were acquainted with each other. Baker was remembered as playing around Patterson, Georgia, and it is possible that he saw Robert Hicks play in a medicine show in Waycross, Georgia.

What is certain is that Baker recorded a number of sides, probably eight, in January and March 1929 in Richmond, Indiana for Gennett Records.

Baker's lyrics often used common blues parlance of the time. His song "Crooked Woman Blues" contained the lines "It's comin' a time, these women won't need no men / They'll find a wash job, an' money come rollin' in". The term 'wash job' related to the employment of washerwoman. In "Weak-Minded Woman", Baker used the lines "A weak-minded woman will let a rounder tear her down / An' when she get in trouble that rounder can't be found". Weak-minded was a derivative of the standard English sense of lacking in strength of purpose, being used as susceptible to loose sexual morals. As 'weak mind', the idiom survived in the speech of black youths up to the 1970s. In the same song, Baker's use of the term 'take' was meant to denote 'to be seized by, or have an attack of something' as described in the lyrics "Woman take the blues, she gonna buy her paper an' read / Man take them blues he gonna catch a train an' leave". Whereas in "No No Blues", Baker sang "I'm long and tall, like a cannon ball / Take a long-tall man, make a kid gal, make a kid gal squall". 'Long and tall' was often used in blues songs, but is now redundant in everyday speech. In the same song, Baker also used the lines "Take a mighty crooked woman, treat a good man wrong / Take a mighty mean man, take another man, take another man's whore". 'Mean' as used here indicated a man of disreputable or amoral intent. Other musicians of that period such as Blind Lemon Jefferson, Freddie Spruell and Charley Patton all used the word in their song lyrics with equal meaning.

Commenting on one of Baker's song titles, "Bad Luck Moan", one historian noted that the term 'moan' was common in both lyrics and song titles on early blues recordings, but that usage generally dried up around 1930. It was used back then to describe a lover's dirge, as in Son House's description of his friend Charley Patton's track, "Mean Black Moan". This accords to the dictionary variant of the word 'moan' meaning a lament in poetical terms.

In recording "Ain't It A Good Thing?", Baker following a short spoken introduction of "Yes! I'm always have more than one"; then boasted as he sang "When I was young, in my prime / I kept a gang of women all the time".

In the mid-1960s, some unreliable sightings placed Baker in Miami, Florida, but it is not certain if this was the same individual who recorded for Gennett. A decade later, Baker's work was assessed in the publication Formulaic Lines and Stanzas in the Country Blues.

== Pseudonyms and confusion of identity ==
Some of the Gennett recordings were later reissued on subsidiary labels, such as Champion and Supertone. These often employed a pseudonym for the original artist, with the express desire of avoiding paying the musician's royalties.

Thus Baker's sides were also later released as by 'Steamboat Bill and His Guitar' (Champion label) and 'Willie Jones and His Guitar' (Supertone label). The one oddity is that in 1934, Varsity Records issued Baker's 1929 track "No No Blues" as the B-side to Handy Archie's A-side, "Miss Handy Hanks". Handy Archie was in itself a pseudonym for one Archie Lewis, although he is not to be confused with the later Jamaican singer of the same name.

Baker's own identity has been the subject of speculation over the ensuing decades among blues historians. Some puzzled whether Baker was another Gennett Records inspired pseudonym, with both Barbecue Bob and Charley Lincoln the most likely true performers. One source noted that although Baker's voice on "Sweet Patunie Blues" sounds similar to Lincoln's own vocal stylings, they doubted either of the Hicks brothers would pay their own travel expenses from Georgia to Indiana, to record a few tracks under an assumed name.

This apparent confusion is exemplified in the compilation album titled, Atlanta Blues : Charley Lincoln & Willie Baker 1927 – 1930. This contains each performers work, and yet seemingly credits Baker's "Mamma, Don't Rush Me Blues" not once, but twice, to Lincoln.

== Discography ==
=== Singles ===
Year	Title (A-side / B-side)	Record label			
Year	Title (A-side / B-side)	Record label	1929	"Sweet Patunie Blues" / "Weak-Minded Woman"	Gennett (Gennett 6751)
1929	"Mamma, Don't Rush Me Blues" / "No No Blues"	Gennett (Gennett 6766)			
1929	"Bad Luck Moan" / "Ain't It A Good Thing?"	Gennett (Gennett 6812)			
1929	"Crooked Woman Blues" / "Rag Baby"	Gennett (Gennett 6846)			

=== Selected compilation albums ===
- Complete Recorded Works (1927–1939) (Document, 1984)
- The Georgia Blues Guitarists (P-Vine, 2002)
- The Rough Guide to Unsung Heroes of Country Blues, Vol. 2 (World Music Network, 2015)

== See also ==
- List of Piedmont blues musicians
