= Piano Red =

American blues musician

Background information
- Also known as: Dr. Feelgood
- Born: Willie Lee Perryman; October 19, 1911; Near Hampton, Georgia, U.S.
- Died: July 25, 1985 (aged 73) Decatur, Georgia, U.S.
- Genres: Blues, R&B
- Instruments: Piano, vocals
- Years active: 1930s–1980s

Willie Lee Perryman (October 19, 1911 – July 25, 1985), usually known professionally as Piano Red and later in life as Dr. Feelgood, was an American blues musician, the first to hit the pop music charts. He was a self-taught pianist who played in the barrelhouse blues style (a loud percussive type of blues piano suitable for noisy bars or taverns). His performing and recording careers emerged during the period of transition from completely segregated "race music" to rhythm and blues, which was marketed to both white and black audiences. Some music historians credit Perryman's 1950 recording "Rocking With Red" for the popularization of the term rock and roll in Atlanta. His simple, hard-pounding left hand and his percussive right hand, coupled with his cheerful shout, brought him considerable success over three decades.

== Early life ==
Perryman was born on a farm near Hampton, Georgia, United States, where his parents, Ada and Henry Perryman, were sharecroppers. He was part of a large family, though sources differ on exactly how many brothers and sisters he had. Perryman was an albino African American, as was his older brother Rufus, who also had a blues piano career as "Speckled Red".

When Perryman was six years old, his father gave up farming and moved the family to Atlanta, where he worked in a factory. Not much is known about Perryman's education or early life, but he recalled that his mother bought a piano for her two albino sons. Both brothers had very poor vision, an effect of their albinism, so neither took formal music lessons, but they developed their barrelhouse style through playing by ear. Perryman sometimes recalled imitating Rufus's style after watching him play, but it is doubtful that his brother was a major influence. Rufus, nineteen years older than Perryman, left Georgia in 1925 and did not return until a 1960 visit. Another influence that Perryman cited in interviews was Fats Waller, whose records his mother brought home. Other influences were likely the local blues pianists playing at "house" or "rent" parties, which were common community fund-raisers of that era.

== Career ==
=== 1930s–1940s ===
By the early 1930s, Perryman was playing at house parties, juke joints, and barrelhouses in Georgia, Alabama, and Tennessee. He developed his percussive playing style and harsh singing style to compensate for the lack of sound systems and to overcome the noise of people talking in venues. He worked these circuits with other Georgia bluesmen, including Barbecue Bob, Charlie Hicks, Curley Weaver, and Blind Willie McTell.

He obtained seasonal employment performing in Brevard, North Carolina, a mountain resort town, and commuted back and forth between there and Atlanta. The Brevard job brought him before white audiences; by 1934 he had also begun to play at white clubs in Atlanta. In Atlanta he would play at a white club until midnight and then head over to an African-American club, where he would play until 4 a.m. Perryman developed a repertoire of pop standards, which were more popular among the white audiences, while continuing his blues sets in African-American clubs.

Around 1936 he began to be billed as "Piano Red". He made his first recordings with McTell in Augusta for Vocalion Records, but they were never released. He also began working as an upholsterer, a trade which he occasionally maintained through later years.

=== 1950s–1960s ===
In 1950, after spending the previous 14 years upholstering and playing music on weekends, Perryman recorded "Rockin' with Red" and "Red's Boogie" at the WGST radio studios in Atlanta for RCA Victor. Both songs became national hits, reaching numbers five and three, respectively, on the Billboard R&B chart, and "Rockin' with Red" has since been covered many times under many titles. This success, along with the further hits "The Wrong Yo Yo" (allegedly written by Speckled Red), "Laying the Boogie" and "Just Right Bounce", allowed him to resume an active performing schedule. He also recorded sessions in New York City and Nashville during the early 1950s.

Red played for white teenagers' high school parties in people's homes in Atlanta. Patrons would arrange for him to be picked up at his home and returned and would provide a "bottle" of booze for him and a modest fee.

During the mid-1950s, Perryman also worked as a disc jockey on radio stations WGST and WAOK in Atlanta, broadcasting The Piano Red Show (later The Dr. Feelgood Show) directly from a shack in his back yard. A young James Brown made an appearance on his show in the late 1950s. Perryman's involvement had him appearing on a flatbed truck in many parades, which led to his song "Peachtree Parade". From the mid-1950s until the late 1960s, he recorded for several record labels, including Columbia, for which he made several records; Checker, for which he recorded eight sides with Willie Dixon on bass; and Groove Records, a subsidiary of RCA Victor, producing the first hit for that label.

Signed to Okeh Records in 1961, Perryman began using the name Dr. Feelgood and the Interns, releasing several hits, including the much-covered "Doctor Feelgood". The persona was one he had initially adopted on his radio shows. The new career was short-lived, though, and he was never able to regain his former stature. In 1963, The Merseybeats recorded a cover of the B-side of "Doctor Feelgood," entitled "Mr. Moonlight" (written by Roy Lee Johnson) as the B-side of their UK top 5 hit "I Think of You". It was also recorded by The Beatles, appearing on the album Beatles for Sale in the United Kingdom and the album Beatles '65 in the United States. In 1966, the Lovin' Spoonful recorded Perryman's song "Bald Headed Lena" on their second album, Daydream.

=== Late career ===
Perryman continued to be a popular performer in Underground Atlanta. He made several European tours late in his career, including appearances at the Montreux Jazz Festival, the Berlin Jazz Festival, and the inauguration of Chancellor Helmut Schmidt, and he also performed on BBC Radio. During this time, he was befriended by Bill Wyman, Keith Richards, Mick Jagger, Eric Clapton, and Paul McCartney, and Pete Ham of Badfinger wrote a song in his honor.

Muhlenbrink's Saloon closed in 1979, and Perryman found himself without a regular job. That lasted until 1981, when he was hired to perform five nights a week at the Excelsior Mill in Atlanta. In 1984, he asked co-owner Michael Reeves to arrange a live recording, and Reeves arranged for a mobile recording in October of that year.

In 1985, Perryman recorded the song "Yo Yo", a duet with Danny Shirley, who was later the lead singer of the band Confederate Railroad. The record reached the national chart in that year.

The tapes from the Excelsior Mill remained in Reeves's possession for twenty-five years. In April 2010, he formed a partnership with the writer and producer David Fulmer to release a CD of the recording under the title The Lost Atlanta Tapes. The CD was released by Landslide Records on August 17, 2010.

== Personal life ==
Perryman married in the early 1930s, and he and his wife, Flora, had two daughters.

=== Death and funeral ===
Perryman was diagnosed with cancer in 1985. He died in July that same year, at Dekalb General Hospital in Decatur, Georgia. Among those who attended his funeral were the governor of Georgia and the mayor of Atlanta.

== Legacy ==
Piano Red's song "Mr. Moonlight" was covered by several UK beat groups, including The Beatles and Johnny Kidd & the Pirates, who recorded it as the B-side of their 1964 single "Always and Ever".
