= Frank Fotusky =

American singer

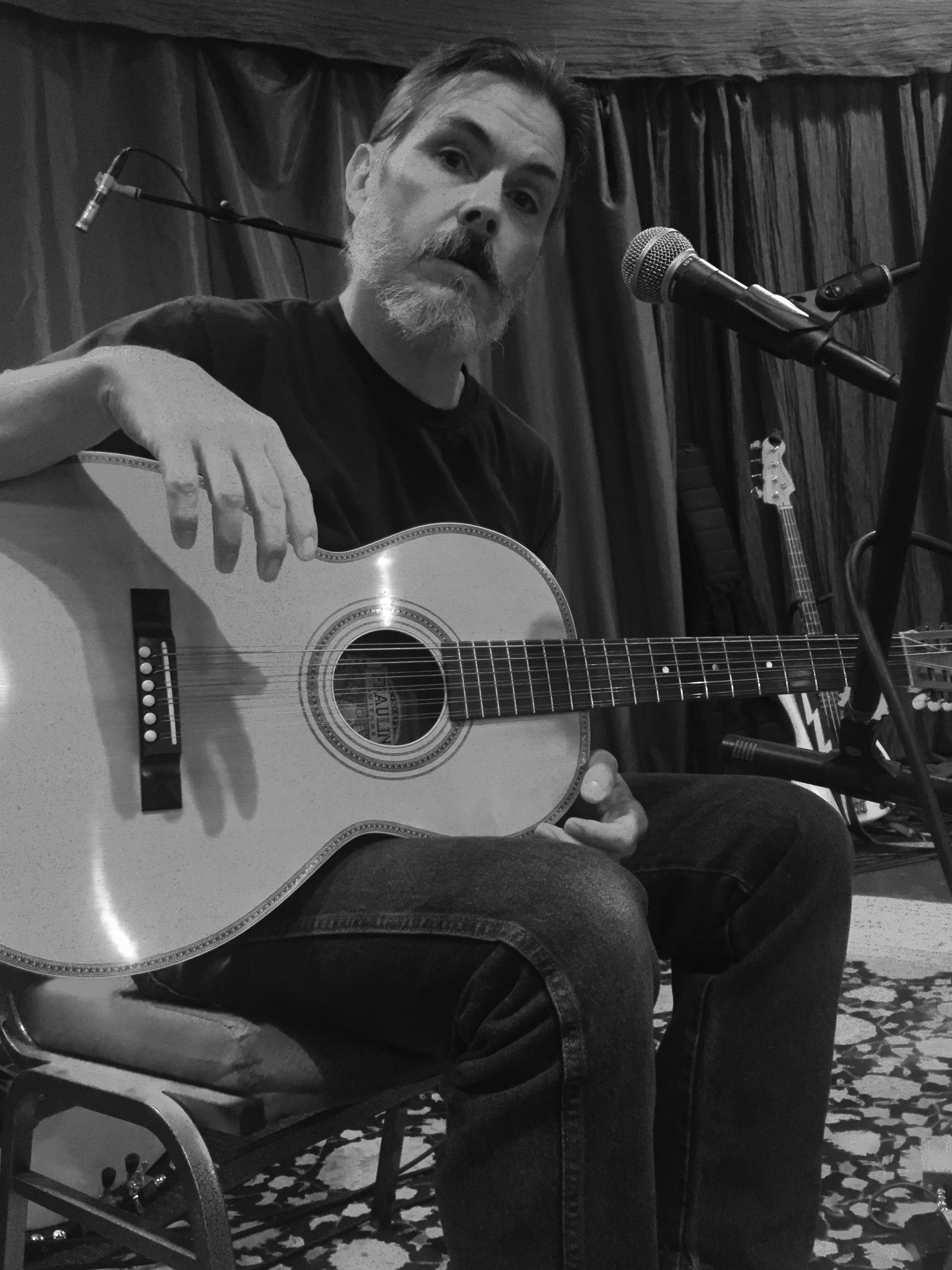
- Fotusky and his 12-string guitar

Background information
- Born: Francis X. Fotusky
- Origin: New Jersey, New York, United States
- Genres: Piedmont blues
- Instruments: Acoustic guitar (6- & 12-string)
- Years active: 1983–present
- Website: frankfotusky.net

Francis X. Fotusky (commonly known as Frank Fotusky) is an American singer-songwriter based in Portland, Maine. He plays six- and twelve-string acoustic guitar, and regularly performs in the Greater Portland area.

Fotusky plays acoustic blues in the Piedmont style reminiscent of guitarists such as Reverend Gary Davis, Blind Boy Fuller, John Jackson and Blind Willie McTell. He has performed or appeared with John Jackson, Paul Geremia, Steve Mann, Will Scarlett, Bonnie Raitt, Buddy Guy and Chris Hillman, amongst others.

His personal record label is Snappy Turtle Records, while his music publishing company is Sixty One Forty Nine Music.

== Discography ==
Fotusky has released two albums: Teasin' the Frets (1999) and Meet Me in the Bottom (2015).

=== Teasin' the Frets ===
1. "Red River Blues" (Lead Belly)
2. "99 Year Blues" (Julius Daniels)
3. "Teasin' the Frets" (Nick Lucas)
4. "On the Cooling Board" (Blind Willie McTell)
5. "Chump Man Blues" (Blind Blake)
6. "Franklynn Mint" (Frank Fotusky)
7. "Untrue Blues" (Blind Boy Fuller)
8. "The Graverobber” (Frank Fotusky)
9. "Boats Up the River" (John Jackson)
10. "I'm So Glad" (Skip James)
11. "Great Change" (Reverend Gary Davis)
12. "Mumbletypeg" (Frank Fotusky)
13. "I'm Going Home Someday" (Roy Book Binder)

=== Meet Me in the Bottom ===
1. "Who's Been Here" (Bo Carter)
2. "39 Ninth Street" (Frank Fotusky)
3. "Windin' Boy Blues" (Jelly Roll Morton)
4. "Pig Meat" (Blind Boy Fuller)
5. "When You've Got a Good Friend" (Robert Johnson)
6. "How Long, How Long Blues" (Leroy Carr)
7. "Good Morning Aurora" (Frank Fotusky)
8. "Meet Me in the Bottom" (Bumble Bee Slim)
9. "Trouble in Mind" (Richard M. Jones)
10. "Mama T'aint Long for Day" (Blind Willie McTell)
11. "The Girl With the Auburn Hair" (Frank Fotusky)
12. "Keep Your Lamps Trimmed and Burning" (Reverend Gary Davis)
13. "39 Ninth Street (Reprise)" (Frank Fotusky)
- Producers: Dennis Bourke and Frank Fotusky
- Recorded, mixed and mastered in May 2014 at Cigars & Guitars Lounge, Ocean Gate, New Jersey
- Engineer: Dennis Bourke

== Personal life ==
Fotusky moved to Portland, Maine, around 2013 with his wife, Lynn. He has three children.

He previously taught Audio Engineering classes at the Performing Arts Academy in Ocean County, New Jersey.
