= Kokomo Records =

- Founded: 1960
- Founder: Ted Griffiths and Trevor Huyton
- Country of origin: United States

Kokomo Records was a British independent record label, founded in 1967 by Ted Griffiths and Trevor Huyton in Manchester.

It reissued pre-war blues recordings by musicians such as Texas Alexander, Kokomo Arnold, Barbecue Bob, Doctor Clayton, Robert Johnson, Blind Willie McTell, Buddy Moss and Tampa Red.

One of its flagship releases was Robert Johnson: Mississippi Delta Blues Singer which was one of the earliest dedicated LP collections of Johnson’s work and predated his subsequent fame.

== See also ==
- List of record labels
