= Eddie Mapp =

- Born: c. 1910; Social Circle, Georgia, United States
- Died: November 14, 1931 (aged 20) Atlanta, Georgia, United States
- Genres: Country blues
- Occupations: Harmonicist, songwriter
- Instrument(s): Harmonica, vocals
- Years active: 1922–1931
- Labels: Various

Eddie Mapp (c. 1910 – November 14, 1931) was an American country blues harmonicist. He is best known for his accompaniment on records by Barbecue Bob and Curley Weaver.

== Biography ==
Mapp was born in Social Circle, Walton County, Georgia. He relocated in 1922 to Newton County, where he met the guitar player Curley Weaver. Mapp was noted in Newton County as a harmonica virtuoso with a unique style, who often performed for tips on the street. In 1925 Weaver and Mapp left for Atlanta. The twosome played at country dances. Weaver then formed a group with Mapp, Barbecue Bob, and Bob's brother Charlie Hicks and continued to play locally.

In 1929, billed as the Georgia Cotton Pickers, they recorded for the Atlanta-based QRS label. Mapp also cut one solo track, "Riding the Blinds", the same year. None of the songs sold well.

In November 1931, Mapp was found stabbed on an Atlanta street corner. His death certificate recorded that the brachial artery in his left arm had been severed. It gave his age as twenty. No one was charged with his murder. The certificate also noted that he was a musician; it was unusual at the time for a coroner to acknowledge such employment.

== Discography ==
A compilation album, Georgia Blues 1928–33, released in 1994 by Document Records (DOCD-5110), provides the most complete discography of Mapp's work. It includes the following pieces featuring Mapp:

- Curley Weaver and Eddie Mapp, "No No Blues" and "It's the Best Stuff Yet"
- Eddie Mapp and Guy Lumpkin, "Decatur Street Drag" and "Riding the Blinds"
- Slim Barton, Eddie Mapp and James Moore, "I'm Hot Like That", "Careless Love", "Wicked Travelin' Blues", "It's Tight Like That" and "Poor Convict Blues"
- Eddie Mapp, James Moore and Guy Lumpkin, "Where You Been So Long" (1929)
- Slim Barton and Eddie Mapp, "Fourth Avenue Blues" (1929)

== See also ==
- List of country blues musicians
- List of harmonica blues musicians
- List of unsolved murders (1900–1979)
