= Floyd Council =

American singer (1911–1976)

Background information
- Also known as: Dipper Boy Council
- Born: September 2, 1911; Chapel Hill, North Carolina, U.S.
- Died: May 9, 1976 (aged 64) Sanford, North Carolina, U.S.
- Genres: Piedmont blues; country blues
- Instruments: Guitar, mandolin, vocals
- Years active: 1920s–late 1960s

Floyd Council (September 2, 1911 – May 9, 1976) was an American blues guitarist, mandolin player, and singer. He was a practitioner of the Piedmont blues, which was popular in the southeastern United States in the 1920s and 1930s. He was sometimes credited as Dipper Boy Council and promoted as "The Devil's Daddy-in-Law".

== Biography ==
Born in Chapel Hill, North Carolina, United States, to Harrie and Lizzie Council, he began his musical career on the streets of Chapel Hill in the 1920s, performing with two brothers, Leo and Thomas Strowd, as the Chapel Hillbillies. In the late 1920s and early 1930s he and Blind Boy Fuller busked in the Chapel Hill area. Council recorded twice for ARC at sessions with Fuller in the mid-1930s, all examples of the Piedmont style.

Council married Pearly Mae Farrington, daughter of Libert and Annie Farrington of Chapel Hill, North Carolina.

Council suffered a stroke in the late 1960s, which partially paralyzed his throat muscles and slowed his motor skills, but did not significantly damage his cognitive abilities. The folklorist Peter B. Lowry attempted to record him one afternoon in 1970, but Council never regained his singing or playing abilities. Accounts say that he remained sharp in mind.

Council died in 1976 of a heart attack, after moving to Sanford, North Carolina. He was buried at White Oak AME Zion Cemetery in Sanford. In 2014, the Killer Blues Headstone Project placed a headstone for him.

== The Floyd in Pink Floyd ==
Syd Barrett, of the English psychedelic rock band Pink Floyd, created the band's name by juxtaposing the first names of Council and South Carolina bluesman Pink Anderson, having noticed the names in the liner notes of a 1962 album by Blind Boy Fuller (Philips BBL-7512), written by the blues historian Paul Oliver: "Curley Weaver and Fred McMullen, ... Pink Anderson or Floyd Council—these were a few amongst the many blues singers that were to be heard in the rolling hills of the Piedmont, or meandering with the streams through the wooded valleys."

== Discography ==
No records are available which exclusively feature Council's work. The CD Carolina Blues features six songs he recorded:

"I'm Grievin' and I'm Worryin'"

"I Don't Want No Hungry Woman"

"Lookin' for My Baby"

"Poor and Ain't Got a Dime"

"Runaway Man Blues"

"Working Man Blues"

In a 1969 interview, Council stated he had recorded 27 songs over his career, seven of them backing Blind Boy Fuller. Fuller's Complete Recorded Works contains many songs with Council playing guitar.
