= Music of Georgia =

Music of Georgia may refer to:

- Music of Georgia (country)
- Music of Georgia (U.S. state)
