= Wrecking Ball (Dead Confederate album) =

Studio album by Dead Confederate
- Released: September 16, 2008
- Recorded: January 2008
- Genres: Alternative rock, psychedelic rock, alt-country, grunge
- Length: 56:25 (61:05 With Bonus Track)
- Label: The Artists Organization
- Producer: Mike McCarthy

Dead Confederate chronology
Dead Confederate; EP (2008)	Wrecking Ball (2008)	Dirty Ammo; Live EP (2009)

Singles from Wrecking Ball
- 1. "The Rat" Released: 2008; 2. "Start Me Laughing" Released: 2008

Professional ratings
Review scores
Source	Rating
The A.V. Club	(A−) link
Allmusic	link
Blender	link
Magnet	(favorable) link
New York Times	(favorable) link
Paste	(70/100) link
Pitchfork Media	(5.7/10) link
Rock Sound	link
Spin	link

Wrecking Ball is the first full-length album from the band, Dead Confederate. It was recorded in Austin, TX with producer Mike McCarthy (Spoon, ...And You Will Know Us by the Trail of Dead, Heartless Bastards) in January 2008.

== Track listing ==
No.	Title	Writer(s)	Length
1.	"Heavy Petting"	Hardy Morris	5:16
2.	"The Rat"	Brantley Senn	5:15
3.	"Goner"	Morris	3:29
4.	"It Was A Rose"	Morris	5:22
5.	"Yer' Circus"	Senn	4:57
6.	"All The Angels"	Senn	5:10
7.	"Start Me Laughing"	Morris	3:19
8.	"The News Underneath"	Senn	7:11
9.	"Flesh-Colored Canvas"	Senn	12:08
10.	"Wrecking Ball"	Morris	5:18
11.	"As Able, As Well" (iTunes Bonus Track)	Senn	4:40
Total length:			56:25

== Personnel ==
Dead Confederate

- Hardy Morris - vocals, electric guitar, acoustic guitar
- Brantley Senn - bass, vocals
- Walker Howle - electric guitar
- John Watkins - keyboards
- Jason Scarboro - drums

Production

- Mike McCarthy - producer, mixing, engineer
- Jim Vollentine - engineer
- Bob Ludwig - mastering
- Joel Wheat - artwork
