= Dead Confederate EP =

Dead Confederate

EP by Dead Confederate
- Released: January 22, 2008
- Recorded: 2007
- Genre: Alternative rock, Psychedelic rock, Alt-country, Grunge
- Label: The Artists Organization

Dead Confederate chronology
Dead Confederate (2008)	Wrecking Ball (2008)

Professional ratings
Review scores
Source	Rating
NPR Music	(favorable) link
Three Imaginary Girls	link

Dead Confederate is the eponymous debut EP by Georgia-based psychedelic rock band Dead Confederate.

== Track listing ==
No.	Title	Writer(s)	Length
1.	"Memorial Day Night"	Hardy Morris	3:14
2.	"The Rat"	Brantley Senn	5:10
3.	"Tortured-Artist Saint"	Senn	6:37
4.	"Get Out"	Morris	4:50
5.	"Shadow the Walls"	Senn	5:28
Total length:			25:19

== Personnel ==
Dead Confederate

- Hardy Morris - vocals, electric guitar, acoustic guitar
- Brantley Senn - bass, vocals
- Walker Howle - electric guitar
- John Watkins - keyboards
- Jason Scarboro - drums

Production

- Mike McCarthy - mixing
- Jim Vollentine - assistant engineer
- Kris Sampson - recorded "Tortured-Artist Saint", "Get Out", and "Shadow The Walls" at Nickel & Dime Studios in Atlanta, GA.
- Billy Bennett - recorded "The Rat" at Chase Park Transduction in Athens, GA.
- Brantley Senn - recorded "Memorial Day Night" at home.
