= Jerry Zolten =

- Born: Joseph Jerome Zolten
- Education: Penn State
- Occupations: Author, record producer, educator
- Years active: 1960s–present
- Notable work: Great God A'Mighty! The Dixie Hummingbirds. Celebrating the Rise of Soul Gospel Music (Oxford University Press) Bruce Springsteen, Cultural Studies, and the Runaway American Dream [Co-Editor] (Ashgate) Wreckin' the House The Fairfield Four (Dead Reckoning Records) Beautiful Stars Isaac Freeman (Lost Highway Records) Chimpin' the Blues with Robert Crumb and Jerry Zolten (East River Records).
- Style: American Roots Music
- Awards: Kjell Meling Award for Distinction in the Arts and Humanities
- Website: jerryzolten.com

Joseph Jerome Zolten is an American writer, advocator for, and producer of American roots music. A professor at Penn State University, he is best known as the author of a book tracing the 90-year career of the African-American Dixie Hummingbirds gospel group and their influence on both sacred and secular music. He also writes about and is a noted expert on the history of American stand-up comedy. Zolten is also known for numerous articles and album liner notes on blues, country, and gospel music as well as collaborations on musical projects with Robert Crumb and Harvey Pekar. His more recent writings and musical releases include "The Beatles as Recording Artists" in The Cambridge Companion to the Beatles, biographical and musicological entries on Paramount recording artists for The Rise and Fall of Paramount Records 1917–1927, and Chimpin' the Blues with Robert Crumb and Jerry Zolten, an audio collection of conversation and rare blues and blues-related recordings from the early 20th Century. In 2017 he co-produced and narrated the public radio program Time to Lay It Down: The Soundtrack of the Vietnam War. Zolten appears in the documentary film Ballad of the Dreadnought, produced by the Martin Guitar Company telling the story of their flagship D model guitars. He is also a co-producer and appears in the documentary film How They Got Over: Gospel Quartets and the Road to Rock and Roll

== Undergraduate years ==
As an undergraduate at Penn State, Zolten was president of the Penn State Folklore Society. He performed in numerous musical groups, most notably a jug band, the New Old Time Wooley Thumpers. The Wooley Thumpers opened for Janis Joplin and Big Brother and the Holding Company at a 1968 Penn State performance. With the group and as a single, Zolten performed at diverse venues such as the Jawbone Coffeehouse, the Central Pennsylvania Festival of the Arts, and Lewisburg Penitentiary. The Wooley Thumpers also recorded a single in 1969 for Buddah Records. Billed on the label as "Protozoa," a name assigned by the label, the tracks, written as parodies of then popular bubblegum music, were "Ring Around My Rosie" and "Pink Hippopotamus." (Buddah 142).

== Record production ==
Zolten produced two albums for the Fairfield Four, Wreckin' the House/Live at Mt. Hope, released by Dead Reckoning Records and Beautiful Stars for the group's bass singer, Isaac Freeman, released by Lost Highway Records. Among his public radio productions are Chimpin' the Blues, a history of early blues and pre-blues co-hosted with underground cartoonist Robert Crumb, In the Spirit, a history of Black gospel music, and Boppin' With Pekar, an overview of jazz history with Harvey Pekar of American Splendor and special guest, artist Phoebe Gloeckner.

Zolten along with Mark Bernhard and Ken Womack produced in conjunction with Penn State Altoona, Monmouth University, Virginia Tech, and the University of Southern Indiana a series of Glory Days/A Bruce Springsteen Symposium conference/conferences (2005, 2009, 2012). In collaboration with the Grammy Museum and the Guthrie Foundation, Zolten produced WOODY@100 at Penn State, a 2012 Centennial Celebration of American folk musician Woody Guthrie.

== Awards ==
Best Research Recorded Blues and Gospel Music Award, 2004, ARSC (Association for Recorded Sound Collections), Great God a’Mighty! The Dixie Hummingbirds: Celebrating the Rise of Soul Gospel Music by Jerry Zolten (Oxford University Press)

Recipient of the Kjell Meling Award for Distinction in the Arts and Humanities, 2010.

Recipient of a 2018 PRNDI Award as co-producer, writer, and narrator of the public radio program Time To Lay It Down: The Soundtrack of the Vietnam War.

Recipient of the 2021 Lion's Paw Medal, an annual award from Penn State University recognizing notable service to the university and its students.

== Publications ==
- Speaking to an Audience : a practical method of preparing and performing(with Gerald M.Phillips). Bobbs/Merrill-Macmillan 1985 ISBN 0-672-61626-2 OCLC 10996060
- "The Media-Driven Evolution of the African American Hard Gospel Style as a Rhetorical Response to Hard Times" The Howard Journal of Communications Volume 7, Number 3, 1996
- "Jumpstartin' the Blues: Piedmont Bluesman Archie Edwards" Living Blues April 1996
- "In Memoriam: Samuel Bayard" Sing Out! May 1997
- "A Rough Rugged Road: From Georgia to Chicago to Hollywood with Bumble Bee Slim" Living Blues September 1997.
- "Terry Evans...I Write About People Coming Together" Living Blues Nov-Dec 1999.
- with Robert Duran, "The effect of reticence on college students' use of electronic mail to communicate with faculty," Communication Education, Volume 50, Issue 2, 1997 ISSN 0363-4523 OCLC 630732322
- " 'I Ain't Lyin'! The Unexpurgated Truth about Rudy Ray Moore" Living Blues May–June 2001.
- Great God A'Mighty!:The Dixie Hummingbirds - Celebrating the Rise of Soul Gospel Music Oxford University Press, 2003 ISBN 0-19-515272-7 OCLC 49566343 New York Times review
- "The Beatles as Recording Artists," The Cambridge Companion to the Beatles Cambridge University Press, 2009 ISBN 978-0-521-86965-2
- Contributor, The Greenwood Encyclopedia of African American Folklore
- "A Tale of Two Technologies...And the Buffalo Ragged Five, Pioneering Country Music Recording Artists," (Commissioned by the Country Music Hall of Fame) The Old-Time Herald 2007.
- “Music of the Soul,” in The Gospel at Colonus, Edinburgh International Festival Program, 2010.
- “Making a Joyful Noise: Music Traditions in Huntingdon County’s African American Community (Commissioned by the Huntingdon County Arts Council), From These Hills and Valleys, 2010
- with Mark Bernhard and Ken Womack "Glory Days : a Bruce Springsteen Celebration" Interdisciplinary literary studies Volume 9, Number 1, 2007. OCLC 436997429
- with Ken Womack and Mark Bernhard, Bruce Springsteen, Cultural Studies, and the Runaway American Dream Ashgate, (2012) ISBN 9781409404972

== In the news ==
- Review...New York Times
- Jerry Jazz Musician
- Rock's Back Pages...
- The Horace Digby Report
- Research/Penn State
- Santoro, Gene, Highway 61 Revisited/The Tangled Roots of American Jazz, Blues, Rock & Country Music
- Pittsburgh Post Gazette
- Pittsburgh Post Gazette
- Radio Program Downloads...WRTA
- Salt Lake City Deseret News
- Penn State Live
- Altoona Mirror
- Town and Gown
- Take Note Penn State Public Broadcasting
- Race Matters - Race and Humor Penn State Public Broadcasting
- Washington Post Book Review
- Hazleton Times Leader
- Altoona Mirror
- Altoona Mirror
- Centre Daily Times
- Atlantic City Press
- Wall Street Journal
