= George Carter (musician) =

American blues musician

George Carter was an American blues musician, who recorded four songs for Paramount Records in 1929. Very little is known of his life. Believed to have hailed from Atlanta, Georgia, United States, he played a twelve-string guitar, common in the Atlanta area, occasionally using an open tuning and a slide. Some blues scholars believe that "George Carter" may actually be a pseudonym for another Atlanta blues singer at the time, Charley Lincoln. Carter's song, "Hot Jelly Roll Blues", was recorded by Hot Tuna for their album Yellow Fever in 1975.

== Recordings ==
All recordings were made in February 1929.

- "Rising River Blues" - 12750A
- "Hot Jelly Roll Blues" - 12750B
- "Ghost Woman Blues" - 12769A (Also issued by Herwin Records under Record no. 93018 under the name "Bob Crane")
- "Weeping Willow Blues" - 12769B (Also issued by Herwin Records under Record no. 93018 under the name "Bob Crane")
