= Yellow Fever (album) =

Studio album by Hot Tuna
- Released: November 1975
- Recorded: June – August 1975 at Wally Heider Studios, San Francisco
- Genres: Blues rock, hard rock
- Length: 39:36
- Label: Grunt
- Producers: Hot Tuna; Mallory Earl

Hot Tuna chronology
America's Choice (1975)	Yellow Fever (1975)	Hoppkorv (1976)

Professional ratings
Review scores
Source	Rating
Allmusic	3/5 stars
Christgau's Record Guide	B−
Rolling Stone	(not rated)

Yellow Fever is the sixth album by the American blues rock band Hot Tuna, recorded and released in 1975 as Grunt BFL1-1238. The album was also released in Quadraphonic as Grunt BFD1-1238. The album rose to #97 on the Billboard charts.

== Track listing ==
Side A
No.	Title	Writer(s)	Length
1.	"Baby What You Want Me to Do"	Jimmy Reed	6:42
2.	"Hot Jelly Roll Blues"	George Carter	4:21
3.	"Free Rein"	Jorma Kaukonen, Paul Ziegler	4:14
4.	"Sunrise Dance with the Devil"	Kaukonen	4:28

Side B
No.	Title	Writer(s)	Length
1.	"Song for the Fire Maiden"	Kaukonen, Greg Douglass	4:16
2.	"Bar Room Crystal Ball"	Kaukonen	6:52
3.	"Half/Time Saturation"	Kaukonen, Jack Casady, Bob Steeler	4:45
4.	"Surphase Tension"	Kaukonen	3:58

== Personnel ==
- Jorma Kaukonen – vocals, guitars
- Jack Casady – bass
- Bob Steeler – drums

=== Additional personnel ===
- Nick Buck – synthesizer on "Bar Room Crystal Ball"
- John Sherman – 2nd guitar on "Baby What You Want Me to Do"

=== Production ===
- Hot Tuna – producer
- Mallory Earl – producer, engineer
- Pat Ieraci (Maurice) – production coordinator
- Steve Malcolm – assistant engineer
- Michael Casady – equipment
- Bill Thompson – manager
- Acy Lehman – art direction
- Gribbitt – design
- Mick Haggerty – illustration
- Recorded and Mixed at Wally Heider Studios, San Francisco
- Mastered by Rick Collins, Kendun Recorders, Burbank
