= Dirty Ammo =

Dirty Ammo EP

EP by Dead Confederate
- Released: December 21, 2009
- Recorded: May 27, 2009
- Genre: Alternative rock, Psychedelic rock, Alt-country, Grunge
- Label: The Artists Organization

Dead Confederate chronology
Wrecking Ball (2008)	Dirty Ammo EP (2009)	Sugar (2010)

Dirty Ammo is a live EP by the band Dead Confederate released by The Artists Organization. All of the songs on Dirty Ammo (EP) were recorded in Atlanta, GA at the Earl on May 27, 2009. Dirty Ammo includes five original songs, including one previously unreleased song called "Guns," and two cover songs. Dead Confederate donated one dollar for every copy sold to help rebuild the Georgia Theater, which was destroyed in a fire in 2009.

== Track listing ==
All tracks recorded live.

No.	Title	Writer(s)	Length
1.	"Get Out"	Hardy Morris	6:00
2.	"Start Me Laughing"	Morris	3:30
3.	"Shadow The Walls"	Brantley Senn	5:24
4.	"Roman Candle" (Elliott Smith cover)	Elliott Smith	3:18
5.	"Smoking In A Minor" (Officer May cover)	Chris Warren	5:03
6.	"Guns"	Senn, Morris	4:31
7.	"Tortured-Artist Saint"	Senn	8:32
Total length:			36:18

== Personnel ==
Dead Confederate

- Hardy Morris - vocals, electric guitar
- Brantley Senn - bass, vocals
- Walker Howle - electric guitar
- John Watkins - keyboards
- Jason Scarboro - drums

Production

- Ross Gower - engineer, mixing, mastering
- Dustin Lane, Ryan Zacarius, Brantley Senn - artwork
