= Dead Confederate =

American alternative rock band

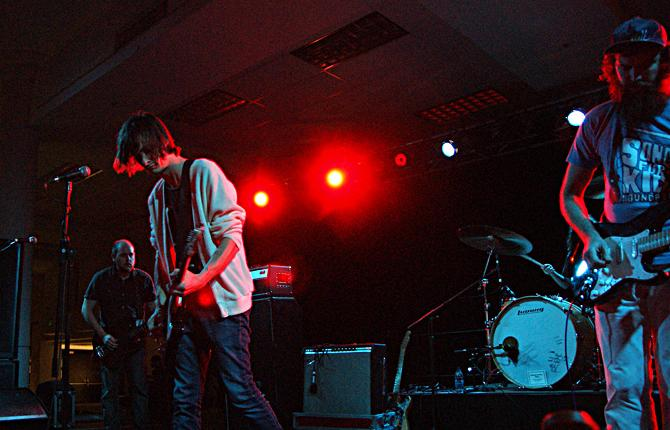
- Dead Confederate live at Bumbershoot 2009.

Background information
- Origin: Augusta, Georgia, United States
- Genres: Alternative rock, psychedelic rock, alternative country, grunge
- Years active: 1997–2003 (Redbelly); 2004–2006 (The Redbelly Band); 2006–2015
- Labels: TAO/Old Flame Records (US); Kartel (UK & Europe); Spiderbomb Records
- Spinoffs: The Redbelly Band
- Past members: Hardy Morris; Brantley Senn; Walker Howle; John Watkins; Jason Scarboro
- Website: www.deadconfederate.com

Dead Confederate was an American alternative rock band, formed in Augusta, Georgia and based in Athens, Georgia. The band's sound was described as a mix of alternative country, psychedelic rock and grunge, and has drawn comparisons to Nirvana and My Morning Jacket.

== History ==
Childhood friends Thomas Hardy Morris and Walker Howle had played together since high school in Augusta, Georgia, and, along with Jason Scarboro, Brantley Senn, and Morris's brother Dawson, formed Redbelly in college in 1997.

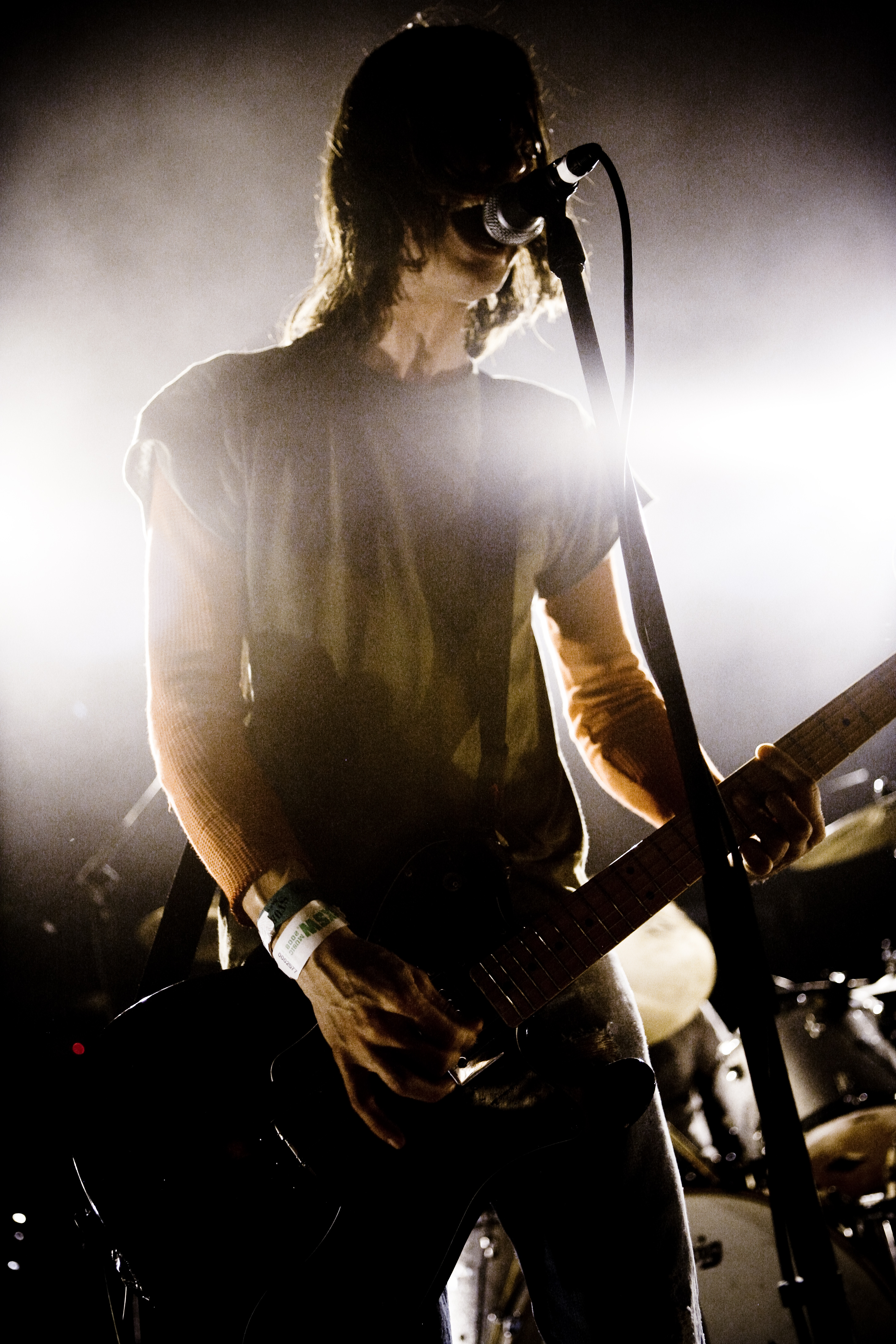
Dead Confederate perform at South by Southwest 2008.

Redbelly's original lead singer, Dawson Morris, left and the band eventually went on to release its self-titled debut in October 2003 (recorded in Augusta in December 2002). At this point, the band was primarily a southern rock-influenced jam band whose songs would often be 20 or 30 minutes long and were styled between Neil Young and Pink Floyd. Drummer Jason Scarboro later commented that the band had had its "share of playing 20- and 30-minute songs and really, it sucked—It's something that gets really old"; Senn also commented that "We knew we were making music that didn’t match the music we were into. We were going nowhere".

A turning point for the band came when the members relocated to Atlanta, where they were joined by John Watkins and renamed themselves The Redbelly Band. The Redbelly Band released an EP entitled Underbelly in 2004, as well as what would become the Redbelly Band's last album, Petition To The Queen (recorded at Transduction Studios in Athens) in 2006. The album featured the first version of the Senn-penned track The Rat, which was intentionally tighter than the band's previous looser, more improvised material.

In late 2006, the members relocated to Athens, where Morris and Senn attended college. Taking themselves more seriously and writing tighter, more song-based material, they renamed the band Dead Confederate. When questioned about the new name, frontman Morris commented that it "sounded like we did; a bit dark, a bit militant, a bit southern"; Senn later commented that the Redbelly Band was "a terrible name". After beating hundreds of bands to win the Open Mic Madness battle of the bands competition in Atlanta, the band was given the prize of two days' free recording at the city's Nickel and Dime Studios, where they produced a four-song demo.

In 2007, former Capitol Records president Gary Gersh, who had previously signed Sonic Youth and Nirvana to Geffen Records signed Dead Confederate as the first band on his new label TAO. Radio DJ and record company scout Scott Register had seen the band play in Birmingham, Alabama and had played the band's demo to Gersh. On January 22, 2008, the band released its self-titled debut EP, which was a collection of early recordings. The new EP and an appearance at the South by Southwest festival in Austin, Texas resulted in some national exposure.

On September 16, 2008, the band released its first LP, Wrecking Ball, on the TAO label. The band recorded the album earlier that year with producer Mike McCarthy in Austin.

The band toured the album nationwide, including shows with Dinosaur Jr, and in Europe with A Place To Bury Strangers and J Mascis.

On October 10, Dead Confederate made its first national television appearance, performing The Rat on Late Night with Conan O'Brien. Four months later, the song spent a week at No. 39 on the Billboard Alternative Songs chart.

In 2009, the band signed a deal with Kartel in the UK and Europe, which saw "Wrecking Ball" released on October 26, 2009, with a selection of the tracks from the band's debut EP as bonus material.

The band released its second LP, Sugar, in North America on October 24, 2010, and in the UK and Europe on September 13. The album was recorded with producer John Agnello in Hoboken, New Jersey, during record-setting snowfall, a factor that influenced the album's title. Morris described the album as being "more upbeat and psychedelic" than Wrecking Ball and revealed that the band deliberately didn't work on the arrangements for the songs until just days before entering the studio.

In the summer of 2010, the band co-headlined a US tour with Alberta Cross—the "DC/AC" tour, and also toured Europe and England in February 2011 as co-headliners with UK and Europe label mates The Whigs.

In a February 2011 interview, Senn stated that the band was working on an EP of B-sides from the Sugar album sessions, however this was never released.

Following a number of live dates with different drummers, the band announced in August 2011 that drummer Jason Scarboro had left the band to "start a family". The band set to work on their third studio album in early 2012 with Andy LeMaster and Drive-By Truckers producer David Barbe at Chase Park Transduction in Athens. The album In The Marrow was released in April 2013 via the band's own Redeye Distribution distributed Spiderbomb Records, which according to Morriss is a "kind of a culmination of all the stuff we’ve done" and featured new drummer JJ Bower and guests Thayer Sarrano and Matt Stoessel. In December 2012, the band released the EP Peyote People, featuring tracks recorded following the album sessions digitally though their official website. The EP featured guest musicians in addition to the band, and was potentially going to be released not as Dead Confederate but as Peyote People.

== Post-split ==
After splitting up, the band's guitarist Walker Howle has concentrated on his artwork and work in architecture as well as headlining local shows under several names including PigMan and Tia Madre. Bassist Brantley Senn has gone into web development and digital marketing. The band's original drummer Jason Scarboro now works as an electrician. Keyboardist John Watkins has since performed with local bands such as The Honey Sliders and Houston In The Blind.

Morris, as well as playing solo gigs as T. Hardy Morris and The Outfit, formed Diamond Rugs with Deer Tick singer John McCauley and Black Lips guitarist Ian Saint Pé.

In March 2013 it was announced that Morris had signed to Dangerbird Records, and he released his debut solo album Audition Tapes in summer 2013 as T. Hardy Morris and The Outfit. He released follow up album Drownin' on a Mountaintop in 2015.

== Discography ==
=== Studio albums ===
- Wrecking Ball (2008, TAO)
- Sugar (2010, TAO/Old Flame)
- In The Marrow (April 2013)

=== Extended plays ===
- Dead Confederate EP (2008, TAO)
- Dirty Ammo (EP) (2009)
- Peyote People (EP) (2012, Spiderbomb/Redeye)

=== Singles ===
- "The Rat" (2009) No. 39 Billboard Alternative Songs chart
- "Start Me Laughing" (2009)
- "Giving It All Away" (2010)
- "Run From The Gun" (2010)
- "Vacations" (2013)
