= Valerie Turner =

American Blues guitarist-vocalist, educator, and author

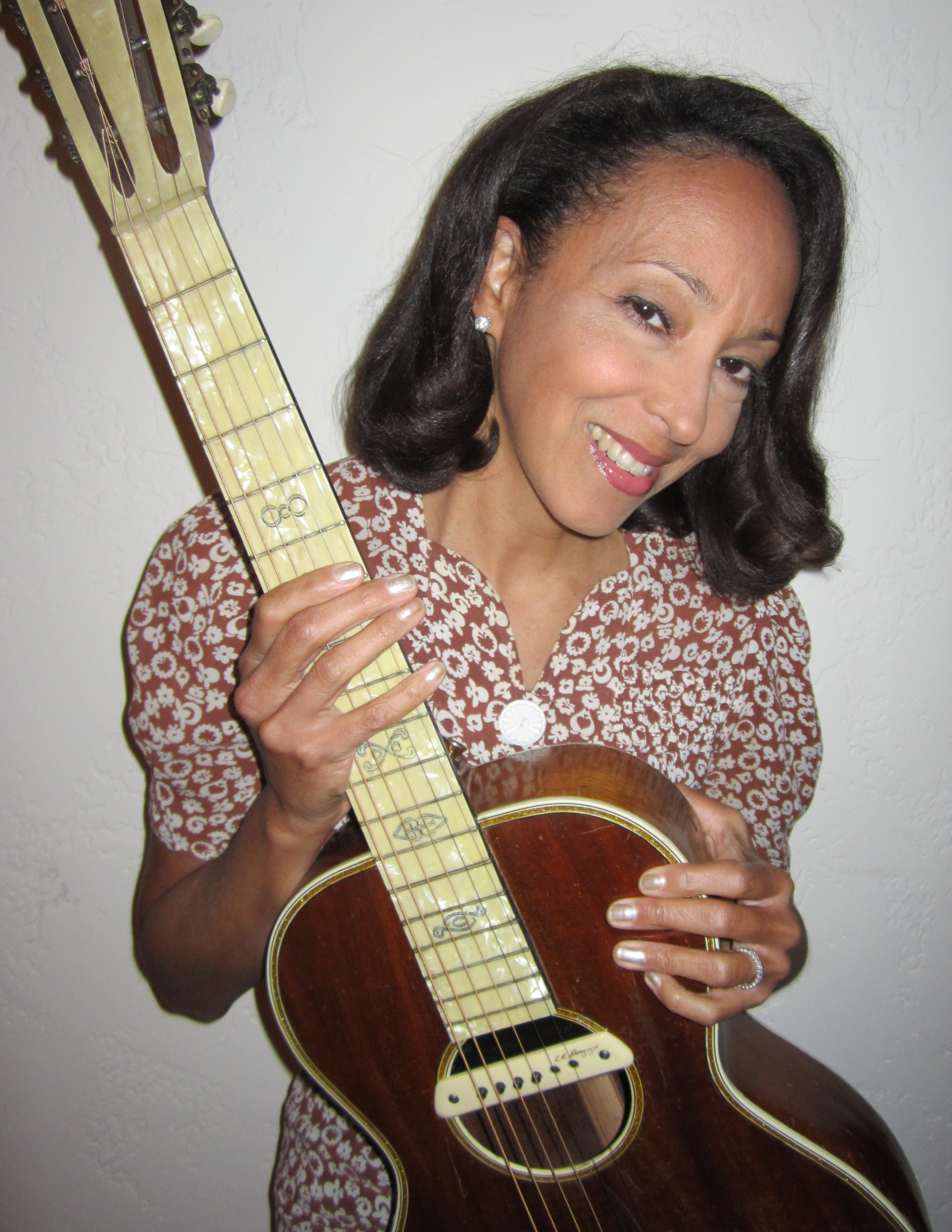
- Education: Queens College (BA) New York University
- Occupations: Guitarist, vocalist, educator and author
- Spouse: Benedict Turner
- Website: www.piedmontbluz.com

Valerie Turner is an American blues guitarist, vocalist, educator, and author. She plays in the Piedmont style of fingerpicking guitar, continuing in the traditions of Mississippi John Hurt, Elizabeth Cotten, Memphis Minnie, and Etta Baker. She performs blues, ballads, country, popular songs, ragtime, and gospels. She is a native New Yorker with southern roots in Virginia and Georgia. She started learning and studying traditional country blues guitar in 1978. Valerie and her husband, Benedict Turner, are an acoustic blues duo called the Piedmont Blūz Acoustic Duo. They specialize in Piedmont blues music, but also perform music from the Delta blues tradition. Benedict and Valerie are ambassadors of historic blues music and educate their audiences about this early tradition and its artists.

== Early life ==
Valerie Turner started playing the ukulele around the age of four and was introduced to the guitar at about nine. Her first music lessons were in Spanish classical guitar and, before Turner became an accomplished blues artist, she earned an undergraduate degree from Queens College in Elementary Education and Foreign Language. She later studied Computer Science at New York University and built a career in Information Technology as a systems analyst and software engineer. She met her future husband, Benedict Turner, in 1985.

== Career ==
Turner's musical path to the blues started with a music book she purchased that included photographs of scenery from the American south. The imagery in the book connected her to her family's southern background in the east coast’s Piedmont region. She taught herself for many years by listening to old vinyl records but, as her interest in country blues music grew, she sought out and found teachers such as Jack Baker, John Cephas, and Woody Mann. These mentors assisted Turner in mastering Piedmont style fingerpicking. Her husband Benedict, who comes from Trinidad and Tobago, plays bones, washboard, and harmonica. A Senior Art Director / Graphic Designer by trade, he designs elaborate musical washboards and has his own line of these unique percussion instruments called Darlington Washboards. Benedict taught himself to play bones and studied washboard with both Washboard Chaz from Louisiana and Newman Taylor Baker who often played with the New York City based Ebony Hillbillies. The Piedmont Blūz Acoustic Duo has been featured in many festivals including the King Biscuit Blues Festival, Merlefest, and the Chicago Blues Festival. Internationally, they have performed in Ireland, Belgium, Austria, Spain, and Israel. Other appearances include Blues in the Gorge in Corbett, Oregon, the Harvest Time Blues Festival in Monaghan, Ireland, Jacob’s Ladder Festival in Sea of Galilee, Israel, the Tel Aviv Blues Festival in Tel Aviv and Jerusalem, Israel, plus the Brooklyn Folk Festival in Brooklyn, New York.

== Publishing ==
In 2017, Turner authored and edited a book entitled Piedmont Style Country Blues Guitar Basics. The easy-to-follow instruction guide contains Piedmont style blues arrangements for Country Blues guitar with audio files and lyrics for 23 tunes. It is a curriculum, a course in understanding country blues guitar using various keys, tunings, timings, standard notation, tablature, chord charts, and fingerpicking techniques. This book has been acquired by the Library of Congress in Washington, D.C.

== Musical style ==
Her guitar style is influenced by her mentor John Cephas. Turner's guitar playing is said to be in the tradition of Mississippi John Hurt, Etta Baker, and Elizabeth Cotten.

== Teaching ==
Turner teaches guitar workshops in Piedmont style finger picking.

== Instruments ==
- Ron Phillips single cone parlor resonator guitar
- Fraulini Annunziata

== Discography ==
- 2015 – Country Blues Selections – the album is an eclectic collection of songs from the country blues tradition.
- 2019 – Ambassadors of Country Blues – the album includes a variety of blues, gospel, and traditional pieces.

== Honors and awards ==
- 2018 – New York Blues Hall of Fame (Valerie Turner – Great Blues Artist)
- 2018 – New York Blues Hall of Fame (Benedict Turner – Great Blues Artist)
- 2018 – New York Blues Hall of Fame (Piedmont Blūz – Great Blues Duo)
