= Bumble Bee Slim =

American blues singer and guitarist (1905–1968)

- Born: Admirl Amos Easton; May 7, 1905; Brunswick, Georgia, U.S.
- Died: June 8, 1968 (aged 63); Los Angeles, California, U.S.
- Genres: Piedmont blues
- Instruments: Vocals; guitar
- Labels: Paramount; Vocalion; Decca; Bluebird

Admirl Amos Easton (May 7, 1905 – June 8, 1968), better known by the stage name Bumble Bee Slim, was an American Piedmont blues singer and guitarist.

== Biography ==
Easton was born in Brunswick, Georgia, United States. Several original sources confirm that he spelled his first name "Admirl". Around 1920 he joined the Ringling Brothers circus. He then returned to Georgia and was briefly married before heading north on a freight train to Indianapolis, where he settled in 1928. There he met and was influenced by the pianist Leroy Carr and the guitarist Scrapper Blackwell.

By 1931 he had moved to Chicago, where he made his first recordings, as Bumble Bee Slim, for Paramount Records. The following year his song "B&O Blues" was a hit for Vocalion Records, inspiring several other railroad blues and eventually becoming a popular folk song. In the next five years, he recorded over 150 songs for Decca Records, Bluebird Records and Vocalion, often accompanied by other musicians, including Big Bill Broonzy, Peetie Wheatstraw, Tampa Red, Memphis Minnie, and Washboard Sam.

In 1937, he returned to Georgia. He relocated to Los Angeles, California in the early 1940s, apparently hoping to break into motion pictures as a songwriter and comedian. During the 1950s he recorded several albums, but they had little impact. His last album was released in 1962 by Pacific Jazz Records.

He continued to perform in clubs around Los Angeles until he died in 1968. In 2022 the Killer Blues Headstone Project placed a headstone for him at St. Matthews AME Church in Waynesville, Georgia.

== See also ==
- List of blues musicians
- List of country blues musicians
- List of Piedmont blues musicians

== Other source ==
- Zolten, Jerry (September/October 1997). "The Rough and Rugged Road of Bumble Bee Slim". Living Blues, no. 135.
