= Too Tight Henry =

American singer (1897/99–1971)

- A crop of the only known photograph of Castle

Background information
- Born: Henry Lee Castle; June 5, 1897 or 1899; Georgia, United States
- Died: August 16, 1971 (aged 72 or 74) Chicago, Illinois, United States
- Genres: Piedmont blues; Country blues
- Instruments: Guitar; Vocals

Too Tight Henry, born Henry Lee Castle (June 5, 1897 or 1899 – August 16, 1971), was an American blues musician who recorded four songs for Columbia Records and Brunswick Records in 1928 and 1930.

== Biography ==
Castle was born in Georgia. He played a twelve-string guitar, a common instrument among Georgia blues musicians at the time. Before moving to and residing in Memphis, Tennessee, he travelled and played music with contemporary blues musicians Blind Blake and Blind Lemon Jefferson. For a period in the 1930s, Castle also lived in Helena, Arkansas. In 1928, he recorded two sides for Columbia Records, including a two-part song called "Charleston Contest", in which Castle talks to himself in different voices and brags about his guitar ability. In 1930, he recorded two more sides in Chicago, Illinois for Brunswick Records. These sides show a more relaxed side to Castle, and he is accompanied by a guitarist and a harmonica player.

After these two sessions, he played in Jed Davenport's Beale Street Jug Band.

Castle died in Chicago on August 16, 1971.

== Recordings ==
=== Recorded October 27, 1928 for Columbia Records in Atlanta, Georgia ===
- "Charleston Contest – Part 1" – 14374D
- "Charleston Contest – Part 2" – 14374D

=== Recorded October 2, 1930 for Brunswick Records ===
- "Squinch Owl Moan" – 7189
- "The Way I Do" – 7189
