= Kid Prince Moore =

American singer

"Kid" Prince Moore was an American blues musician, from the United States, who recorded 17 songs from 1936 to 1938. Moore played in a Piedmont blues style, similar to that of Blind Blake. Moore also recorded two Gospel Music tracks, "Church Bells" and "Sign of Judgement". Moore also accompanied blues pianist Shorty Bob Parker on six of his own tracks. Bruce Bastin, in his book Red River Blues: The Blues Tradition in the Southeast, suggested that Moore may have come from the Carolinas but as of 2026 virtually nothing is known of Moore's life.

== Recordings ==
=== Recorded April 8, 1936, in New York for Melotone Records ===
- "Mississippi Water" - Unissued
- "Bite Back Blues" - Unissued
- "Pickin' Low Cotton" (Take 1) - Unissued
- "Pickin Low Cotton" (Take 2) - Unissued
- "Bug Juice Blues" - 18971=2

=== Recorded April 10, 1936, in New York for Melotone Records ===
- "Church Bells" - 18988
- "Sign of Judgement" - 18989

=== Recorded April 11, 1936, in New York for Melotone Records ===
- "South Bound Blues" - Unissued
- "Honey Dripping Papa" - 18999
- "Market Street Rag" (Take 1) - Unissued
- "Market Street Rag" (Take 2) - Unissued

=== Recorded June 6, 1938 in Charlotte, North Carolina for Decca Records ===
Accompanied by Shorty Bob Parker on all tracks

- "Talkin' About the Snuff" - 64056 (Acc. by Shorty Bob Parker)
- "That's Lovin' Me" - 64057
- "Sally Long Blues" - 64058
- "Ford V-8 Blues" - 64059
- "Single Man Blues" - 64060
- "Bear Meat Blues" - 64061

==== Accompanying Shorty Bob Parker ====
- "Death of Slim Green" - 64052
- "I'm Through With Love" - 64053
- "Ridin' Dirty Motorsickle" - 64054
- "Tired of Being Drug Around" - 64055
- "Rain And Snow" - 64062
- "So Cold In China" - 64063
