= Fred McMullen =

- The only known photo of McMullen

Background information
- Born: c. 1905; Florida, U.S.
- Died: possibly February, 1960 possibly New York, U.S.
- Genre: Country blues
- Occupation: Musician
- Instruments: Vocal; Guitar

Fred McMullen (born c. 1905; date of death unknown) was an American blues singer and guitarist known to be active in the 1930s. He recorded with the guitarists Curley Weaver and Buddy Moss in 1933, after which there is no definitive documentation of his life or whereabouts.

McMullen was born in Florida sometime in 1905. Little else is known about his life prior to his recording sessions with Weaver and Moss, except that he spent time incarcerated at a convict camp in DeKalb County, Georgia. McMullen, who may have settled in Macon after being released from prison, was a regular performer at the 81 Theater in Atlanta, where he first encountered Weaver and Moss. According to Kate McTell in an interview, McMullen was responsible for introducing Moss to her husband, the guitarist Blind Willie McTell, initiating later collaborations between the two. She also suggested that Georgia White wrote songs for McMullen while in Atlanta.

From January 16 to 19, 1933, McMullen joined Weaver, Moss, and Ruth Willis for recording sessions in New York City. Providing bottleneck guitar accompaniment tuned in open G, McMullen also sang lead on "Joker Man Blues" and "Next Door Man", which was released by Vocalion Records and credited to "Jim Miller". He was also the main guitarist on several tracks, including "Wait and Listen", a song with a striking resemblance to Tommy Johnson's style, and "Roll Mama", in which McMullen and Weaver played simultaneous guitar solos. On the final day of the sessions, McMullen joined Weaver and Ross to record as the Georgia Browns, releasing "It Must Have Been Her" and "Who Stole De Lock?"

McMullen apparently moved on after the sessions concluded, never to record again. The Atlanta city directory listed him once, in 1932, filing his name as MacMullin. Moss recalled very little about McMullen but speculated that he returned to Macon. No record of his death is known, but the blues historian Bob L. Eagle hypothesized he could be the same Fred McMullen who died in February 1960.

Much of his work has appeared on the compilation albums Country Blues Classics, Volume 1, Georgia Blues 1927–1930, Some Cold, Rainy Day, and Bottleneck Blues Guitar Classics 1926–37.
