= Sugar (Dead Confederate album) =

Studio album by Dead Confederate
- Released: August 24, 2010
- Recorded: January – February 2010
- Genre: Alternative rock, Psychedelic rock, Alt-country, Grunge
- Label: The Artists Organization, Old Flame Records, Razor & Tie
- Producer: John Agnello

Dead Confederate chronology
Dirty Ammo; Live EP (2009)	Sugar (2010)

Singles from Sugar
- 1. "Giving It All Away" Released: 2010; 2. "Run From The Gun" Released: 2010

Sugar is the second full-length album from Athens, Georgia based band, Dead Confederate. It was recorded in Hoboken, NJ with producer John Agnello (The Hold Steady, Dinosaur Jr., Sonic Youth) in early 2010.

== Track listing ==
No.	Title	Writer(s)	Length
1.	"In The Dark" (feat. Ben Wigler)	Brantley Senn	3:48
2.	"Run From The Gun"	Hardy Morris	2:58
3.	"Father Figure"	Morris	3:20
4.	"Quiet Kid"	Senn	3:57
5.	"By Design"	Morris	3:43
6.	"Mob Scene"	Senn	2:05
7.	"Semi-Thought"	Senn	3:34
8.	"Giving It All Away" (feat. J Mascis)	Senn	4:50
9.	"Sugar"	Morris	3:44
10.	"Shocked To Realize"	Morris	4:10
Total length:			36:09

== Personnel ==
Dead Confederate

- Hardy Morris – vocals, electric guitar, acoustic guitar, production
- Brantley Senn – bass, vocals, string arrangements, production
- Walker Howle – electric guitar
- John Watkins – keyboards
- Jason Scarboro – drums

Additional Musicians

- J Mascis – guitar, vocals
- Ben Wigler – vocals, vibraphone
- Heidi Vanderlee – cello

Production

- John Agnello – producer, mixing, engineer
- James Frazee – assistant engineer
- Greg Calbi – mastering
- Joel Wheat – artwork
