= Buddy Moss =

American blues musician (1914–1984)

Eugene "Buddy" Moss
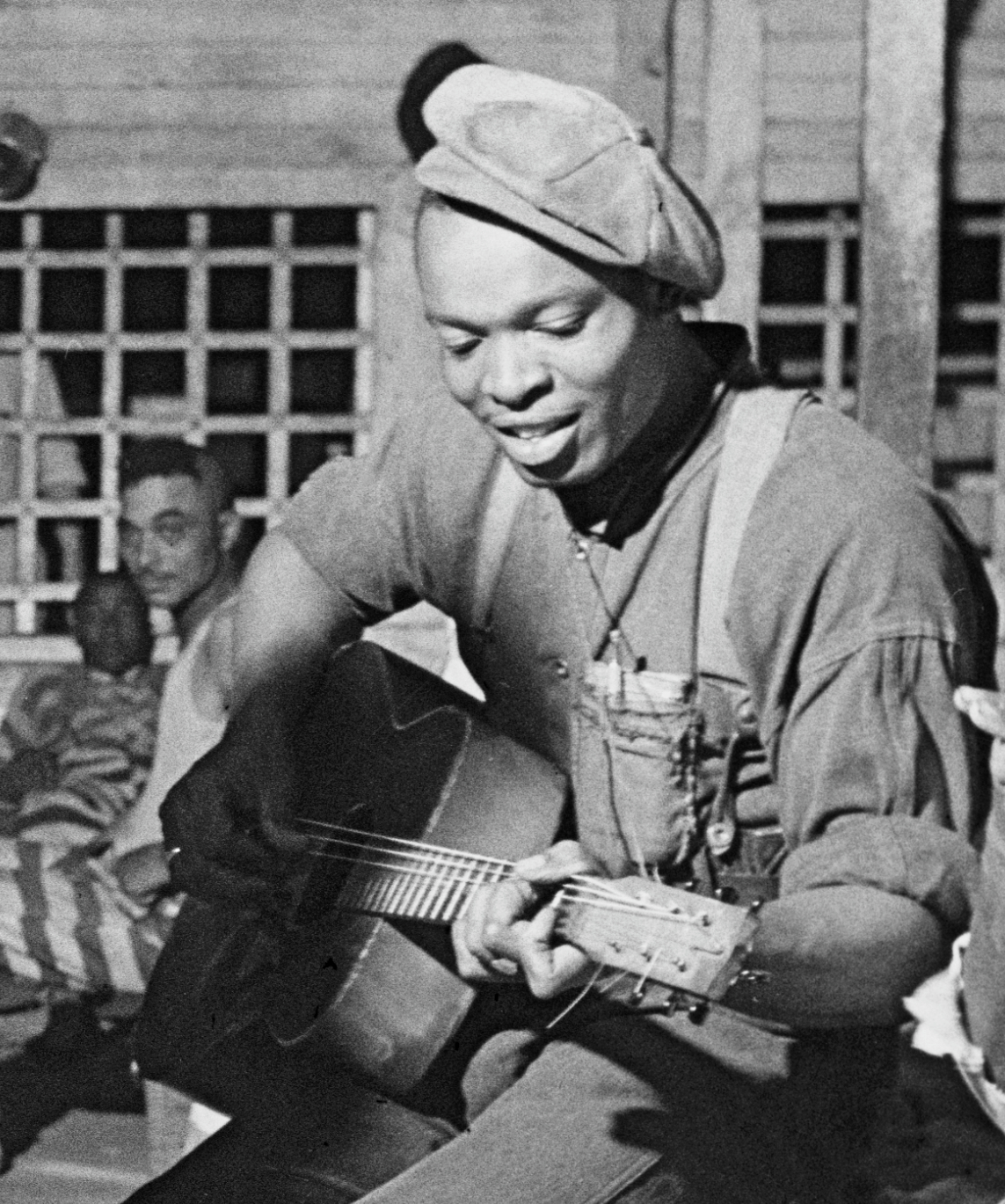
- Moss in 1941

Background information
- Also known as: Buddy Moss
- Born: Eugene Moss; January 16, 1914; Jewell, Georgia, U.S.
- Died: October 19, 1984 (aged 70) Atlanta, Georgia, U.S.
- Genres: Piedmont blues
- Occupations: Musician; songwriter
- Instruments: Guitar; vocals; harmonica
- Years active: 1930–1976
- Labels: Columbia; Biograph

Eugene "Buddy" Moss (January 16, 1914 – October 19, 1984) was an American blues musician. He is one of two influential Piedmont blues guitarists to record in the period between Blind Blake's final sessions in 1932 and Blind Boy Fuller's debut in 1935 (the other being Josh White). A younger contemporary of Blind Willie McTell, Curley Weaver and Barbecue Bob, Moss was part of a coterie of Atlanta bluesmen. He was among the few of his era whose careers were reinvigorated by the blues revival of the 1960s and 1970s.

He began as a musical disciple of Blake. Moss's career was halted in 1935 by a six-year jail term and then by the Second World War, but he lived long enough to be rediscovered in the 1960s, when he revealed that his talent had been preserved through the years. He was reputed to have been cantankerous and mistrusting of others.

In later years, Moss credited his friend and bandmate Barbecue Bob with being a major influence on his playing. Scholars also contend that Blind Blake was a major force in his development, as both share certain mannerisms and inflections. It has also been suggested by Alan Balfour and others that Moss may have been an influence on Blind Boy Fuller, although they never met and Moss's recording career ended before Fuller's began – Moss's first recordings display some inflections and nuances that Fuller did not put down on record until some years later.

== Biography ==
=== Early life ===
Moss was one of 12 children born to a sharecropper in Jewell, Georgia, in Warren County, midway between Atlanta and Augusta. There is some disagreement about the year of his birth, some sources indicating 1906 and many others of more recent vintage claiming 1914. He began teaching himself the harmonica at a very early age, and he played at local parties around Augusta, where the family moved when he was four and remained for the next 10 years. By 1928, he was busking around the streets of Atlanta. "Nobody was my influence," he told Robert Springer of his harmonica playing, in a 1975 interview. "I just kept hearing people, so I listen and I listen, and listen, and it finally come to me."

=== Early musical career ===
By the time he arrived in Atlanta, he was noticed by both Curley Weaver and Robert "Barbecue Bob" Hicks, who began working with the younger Moss. Weaver and Barbecue Bob secured his first recording date when he was 16, as a member of their group the Georgia Cotton Pickers, on December 7, 1930 at the Campbell Hotel in Atlanta, cutting four songs for Columbia: "I'm on My Way Down Home," "Diddle-Da-Diddle," "She Looks So Good," and "She's Comin' Back Some Cold Rainy Day." The group that day consisted of Barbecue Bob and Weaver on guitars and Moss on harmonica. Moss did not record anything more for the next three years.

By 1933, Moss had taught himself the guitar. He frequently played with Barbecue Bob until Bob's death of pneumonia on October 21, 1931. Moss found a new partner and associate in Blind Willie McTell, performing with him at parties around Atlanta.

In January 1933, he made his debut as a recording artist in his own right for the American Record Corporation (ARC) in New York City, accompanied by Fred McMullen and Curley Weaver, cutting three songs, "Bye Bye Mama," "Daddy Don't Care," and "Red River Blues." Another eight songs followed over the next three days, and all 11 were released, more than were released for McMullen or Weaver from those same sessions.

The debut sessions also featured Moss returning to the harmonica, as a member of the Georgia Browns – which comprised Moss, Weaver, McMullen and the singer Ruth Willis – for six songs done at the same sessions. Moss's records were released simultaneously on various budget labels associated with ARC and were so successful that, in mid-September 1933, he returned New York City along with Weaver and McTell. Moss recorded another dozen songs for the company, this time accompanied by Weaver; he also accompanied Weaver and McTell on their numbers.

In mid-1934, this time as a solo guitarist and singer, he recorded more tracks. At this point, Moss's records were outselling those of Weaver and McTell and were widely heard in the southern and border states. His "Oh Lordy Mama" from these sessions became well known as "Hey Lawdy Mama", a song interpreted by various artists. AllMusic noted that "This body of recordings also best represents the bridge that Moss provided between Blind Blake and Blind Boy Fuller – his solo version of "Some Lonesome Day" and also "Dough Rollin' Papa," from 1934, advanced ideas in playing and singing that Fuller picked up and adapted to his own style, while the lingering influence of Blake can be heard in "Insane Blues"."

By August 1935, Moss's fee per song fee doubled, from $5 to $10. He continued to perform with McTell and Weaver, before going back to recording with a new partner, Josh White. They recorded 15 songs the same month, but personal and legal disasters hit his growing reputation.

=== Prison and parole ===
In 1936, Moss was arrested and tried for the shooting murder of his wife and was convicted and sentenced to prison. After the death of Fuller in 1941, his manager, J. B. Long, made efforts to secure Moss' release as a replacement for Fuller. By the combination of Moss' own good behavior as a prisoner and the entreaties of two outside sponsors (Long and Columbia Records) willing to ensure his compliance with parole, Moss was released from prison. While working at Elon College for Long under the parole agreement, Moss met a group of other blues musicians under Long's management, including Sonny Terry and Brownie McGhee.

=== Effects of World War II ===
In October 1941, Moss, Terry and McGhee went to New York City to record for Okeh Records/Columbia, creating 13 numbers by Moss featuring his two new colleagues. Only three of the songs were ever released, and then events conspired to cut short Moss's recording comeback. With the entry of the United States into World War II, the government began rationing shellac, which was used in making 78-rpm records, in 1942; barely enough was allocated to the recording industry to keep it functioning, and record companies were forced to curtail recordings by all but the most commercially viable artists. Also in 1942, the musicians' union placed a ban on recording by its members. Furthermore, the popularity of acoustic country blues began to wane, further reducing record companies' interest in recording it.

=== Later career ===
Moss continued performing in the area around Richmond, Virginia, and Durham, North Carolina, during the mid-1940s. He performed again with Weaver in Atlanta during the early 1950s, but music was no longer able to maintain a living. He went to work on a tobacco farm, drove trucks, and worked as an elevator operator, among other jobs, over the next 20-odd years.

Despite being referred to as one of the most influential bluesmen of the 1930s, he was overlooked by the blues revival. This could be due to the fact that his recording career had been so short (from 1933 to 1935) and he had never recovered from the interruption in his work while he was in prison. In 1964, Moss chanced to hear that his old partner Josh White was giving a concert at Emory University in Atlanta. Moss visited White backstage at the concert and Moss was persuaded to resume performing in a series of concerts before college audiences. He also had new recording sessions for the Columbia label in Nashville, but none of the material was issued during his lifetime.

A concert in Washington, D.C., on June 10, 1966, was recorded, and portions of it were later released by Biograph Records. Moss performed at the Newport Folk Festival in 1969 and appeared at Electric Circus, in New York, in the same year. During the 1970s, he performed at the John Henry Memorial Concert in West Virginia for two consecutive years. He also performed at the Atlanta Blues Festival and the Atlanta Grass Roots Music Festival in 1976, and later at the National Folk Festival, held at Wolf Trap Farm Park in Vienna, Virginia.

=== Death and legacy ===
Moss died in Atlanta on October 19, 1984, once again largely forgotten by the public. In the years since, his music has been available from Biograph Records, which reissued the 1966 performance, and from Document Records, which has released virtually every side that he released between 1930 and 1941. As a result, his reputation has once again grown, although he is still not nearly as well known among blues enthusiasts as McTell or Fuller.

== Discography ==
=== Album ===
- Atlanta Blues Legend (Biograph, 1967) re-released in 1970 as Rediscovery

=== Compilations ===
- Georgia Blues Volume Two (Kokomo, 1968)
- Georgia Blues 1930–1935 (Travelin' Man, 1983)
- Red River Blues: 1933–1941 (Travelin' Man, 1984)
- Buddy Moss 1933–1935 (Document, 1988)
- Buddy Moss 1930–1941 (Travelin' Man, 1990)
- Complete Recorded Works Vol. 1; 1933 (Document, 1992)
- Complete Recorded Works Vol. 2; 1933–1934 (Document, 1992)
- Complete Recorded Works Vol. 3; 1935–1941 (Document, 1992)
- Buddy Moss: The Essential (Document, 2002)
