= Paul Geremia =

American blues musician (1944–2026)

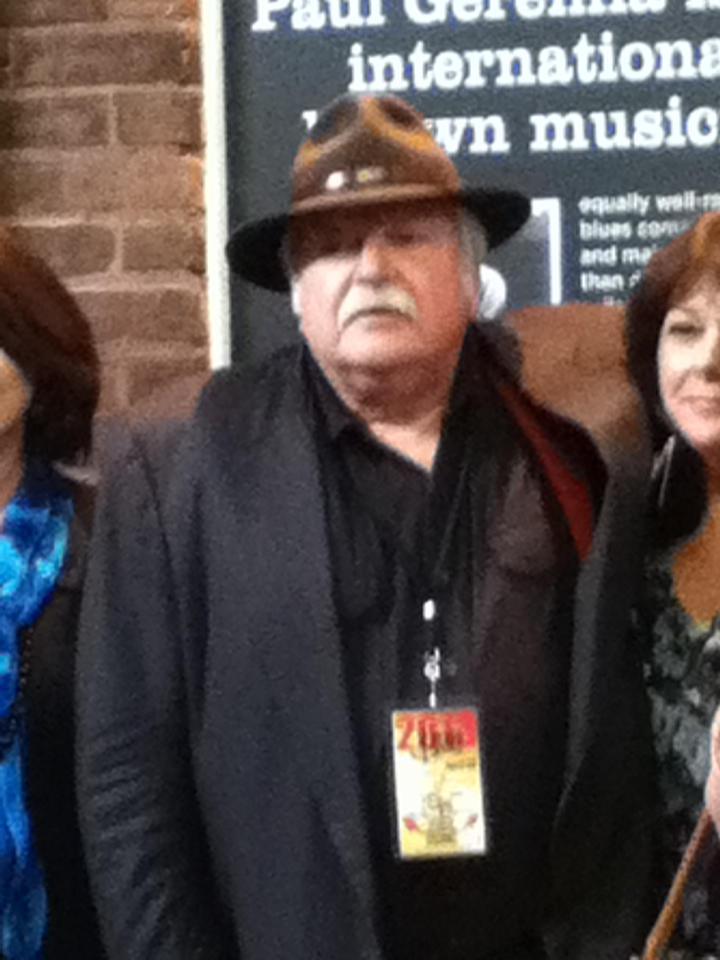

Background information
- Born: April 21, 1944; Providence, Rhode Island, U.S.
- Died: March 14, 2026 (aged 81)
- Genres: Blues
- Occupations: Singer, songwriter
- Instruments: Guitar, harmonica
- Years active: 1966–2026
- Label: Red House
- Website: Paulgeremia.wordpress.com

Paul Geremia (April 21, 1944 – March 14, 2026) was an American blues singer and acoustic guitarist.

Geremia, who was of Italian heritage, was born in Providence, Rhode Island, United States. He recorded his first album in 1968, having been significantly influenced by both the rural blues tradition and the folk music revival of the 1960s. Geremia had never recorded with electric guitar, cleaving steadfastly to a traditional ethic with his acoustic playing.

Geremia died on March 14, 2026, at the age of 81.

== Discography ==
- Just Enough (Folkways Records, 1968)
- Paul Geremia (Sire Records, 1971)
- Hard Life Rockin' Chair (Adelphi Records, 1973)
- I Really Don't Mind Livin' (Flying Fish Records, 1982)
- My Kinda Place (Flying Fish, 1986)
- Gamblin' Woman Blues (Shamrock Records, 1992)
- Self Portrait in Blues (Shamrock Records, 1994)
- Live From Uncle Sam's Backyard (Red House, 1997)
- The Devil's Music (Red House, 1999)
- Love, Murder and Mosquitos (Red House, 2004)
- Love My Stuff (Red House, 2011)

== Achievements ==
- Geremia's rendition of Fred McDowell's "Get Right Church" was the opening track on Preachin’ the Blues: The Music of Mississippi Fred McDowell (Telarc), which earned a Grammy Award nomination in 2002.
- Two of his Red House releases, Gamblin’ Woman Blues and Self Portrait in Blues, were both nominated for W.C. Handy Awards.
- Geremia was inducted into the Rhode Island Music Hall of Fame in 2013.
