= Barbecue Bob =

American blues musician (1902–1931)

- Hicks in 1927

Background information
- Also known as: Barbecue Bob
- Born: Robert Hicks; September 11, 1902; Walnut Grove, Georgia, U.S.
- Died: October 21, 1931 (aged 29) Lithonia, Georgia, U.S.
- Genres: Piedmont blues; country blues
- Instruments: Guitar; vocals
- Years active: 1920s–1931

Robert Hicks (September 11, 1902 – October 21, 1931), known as Barbecue Bob, was an American Piedmont blues musician who played 12 string guitar which was popular in the Atlanta, Georgia, area at the time. A record talent scout gave him his nickname because he worked as a cook in a barbecue restaurant. One of the two existing photographs of him shows him playing his guitar and wearing a full length, white apron and cook's hat.

== Early life ==
Hicks was born in Walnut Grove, Georgia. His parents, Charlie and Mary Hicks, were sharecroppers. They moved to Newton County where his friend Curley Weaver's mother, Savannah "Dip" Weaver, taught Bob and his brother, Charley Lincoln, how to play the guitar. Hicks began playing the six string guitar but picked up the twelve string guitar after moving to Atlanta, in 1924. He became one of the prominent performers of the newly developing Atlanta blues style which featured the 12 string.

In Atlanta, Hicks worked at various jobs, playing music on the side. While working at Tidwells' Barbecue in a north Atlanta suburb, he cooked for and sang to customers and became a local celebrity, coming to the attention of Columbia Records talent scout, Dan Hornsby, who recorded him and dubbed him "Barbecue Bob" using Hicks's job to publicize his records having him pose in chef's whites and hat for publicity photos.

== Career ==
Between March 1927 and December 1930, Hicks recorded 68 songs for Columbia Records, becoming one of the best-selling artists on their race series, being outsold only by Bessie Smith, Ethel Waters and Blind Willie Johnson. "Barbecue Blues", his first song, was his first hit. The record quickly sold 15,000 copies. At his second recording session, in New York City in June 1927, he recorded "Mississippi Heavy Water Blues", a song inspired by the Great Mississippi Flood of 1927 and a recording that firmly established him in the race market. This song and his other blues releases were popular and his records sold better than those of other Atlanta blues musicians.

With his brother, Charley Lincoln, (also known as Charlie Lincoln or Laughing Charley), he recorded "It Won't Be Long Now", a duet with cross talk, in Atlanta on November 5, 1927. In April of the following year, Hicks recorded "Mississippi Low Levee Blues", a sequel to "Mississippi Heavy Water Blues" plus two songs with a singer he had known since childhood, Nellie Florence, being "Midnight Weeping Blues" and "Jacksonville Blues". In April 1930, he recorded "We Sure Got Hard Times Now" which contains bleak references to the Great Depression. As was usual with other blues singers, he recorded a few traditional songs and spirituals including "When the Saints Go Marching In", "Poor Boy, Long Ways from Home" and "Jesus' Blood Can Make Me Whole".

Hicks also recorded as a member of the Georgia Cotton Pickers in December 1930, the group consisting of Hicks, guitarist Curley Weaver and bluesman Buddy Moss playing harmonica. They recorded a handful of songs including their adaptation of Blind Blake's "Diddie Wa Diddie" recorded as "Diddle-Da-Diddle" and the Mississippi Sheiks' "Sitting on Top of the World" recorded as "I'm on My Way Down Home". They were his last recordings.

Hicks died in Lithonia, Georgia, on October 21, 1931, at the age of 29 of a combination of tuberculosis and pneumonia brought on by influenza. His recording of "Mississippi Heavy Water Blues" was played at his graveside before he was buried. In 2017 the Killer Blues Headstone Project placed the headstone for Robert Hicks at United Methodist church in Walnut Grove, Georgia.

== Musical style ==
Hicks developed a "frailing" style of guitar playing more often associated with the traditional claw hammer banjo (as did his brother, and Curley Weaver). He regularly used a bottleneck on his twelve string guitar, playing in an open Spanish tuning (open G or open A tuning) reminiscent of Charley Patton. He had a strong voice which he embellished with growling and falsetto.

== Influence ==
Hicks had some influence on Atlanta blues musicians such as the young Buddy Moss, but his way of playing was quickly overshadowed by the finger-picked Piedmont blues style which rose in popularity by the late 1920s and early 1930s; this development can be heard in the recordings of Curley Weaver and the Reverend Gary Davis.

Eric Clapton played Hicks's "Motherless Child Blues" on stage and recorded it. John Fahey attributed his arrangement of "Poor Boy a Long Ways from Home" to Hicks in his 1979 Best Of book of tablature. Fahey attributed the song to the fictitious Blind Joe Death, writing that "Death learned this from an old Columbia record by Barbecue Bob [14246-D], which the Death household at one time possessed."

== Recording sessions ==
- Atlanta, March 25, 1927
- New York City, June 15, 1927
- New York City, June 16, 1927
- Atlanta, November 5, 1927
- Atlanta, November 9, 1927
- Atlanta, November 10, 1927
- Atlanta, April 13, 1928
- Atlanta, April 21, 1928
- Atlanta, October 26, 1928
- Atlanta, October 27, 1928
- Atlanta, November 2, 1928
- Atlanta, April 11, 1929
- Atlanta, April 17, 1929
- Atlanta, April 18, 1929
- Atlanta, October 30, 1929
- Atlanta, November 3, 1929
- Atlanta, November 6, 1929
- Atlanta, April 17, 1930
- Atlanta, April 18, 1930
- Atlanta, April 23, 1930
- Atlanta, December 5, 1930
- Atlanta, December 7, 1930
- Atlanta, December 8, 1930

== See also ==
- List of blues musicians
- List of country blues musicians
- List of guitarists
- List of nicknames of blues musicians
- List of Piedmont blues musicians
- Yazoo Records

== Other sources ==
- Swinton, Paul. (2001). The Essential Barbecue Bob. Audio CD liner notes. Classic Blues 200026.
- Document Records, vols. 1–3. Sleeve notes on Barbecue Bob (Robert Hicks).
