= Curley Weaver =

American blues musician (1906–1962)

- Also known as: Slim Gordon
- Born: Curley James Weaver; March 25, 1906; Covington, Georgia, United States
- Origin: Atlanta, Georgia
- Died: September 20, 1962 (aged 56) Covington, Georgia
- Genres: Blues
- Occupation: Musician
- Years active: 1925–1959
- Labels: Columbia Records, Okeh, Perfect Records, Vocalion, Melotone, Decca, Sittin' in With, Champion Records

Curley James Weaver (March 25, 1906 – September 20, 1962) was an American blues musician, also known as Slim Gordon.

== Biography ==
=== Early years ===
Weaver was born in Covington, Georgia, and raised on a farm near Porterdale. His mother, Savannah "Dip" Shepard Weaver, was a well-respected pianist and guitarist, who taught Curley and her friend's sons, "Barbecue Bob" and Charlie Hicks. The three formed a group with the harmonica player Eddie Mapp and played locally.

=== Early career ===
Weaver moved to Atlanta in 1925, where he worked as a laborer and performed on the streets and at social events. He first recorded in 1928, for Columbia Records, and subsequently released records on several different labels. He recorded on his own during the 1920s and 1930s, first in the style taught by his mother and later in the spreading Piedmont style, but he was best known for duets with Blind Willie McTell, with whom he worked until the 1950s, and for his work with Barbecue Bob, Fred McMullen, and the harmonica and guitar player Buddy Moss. He was also a member of the recording groups the Georgia Browns (Weaver, Moss, and McMullen) and the Georgia Cotton Pickers (Bob, Weaver, and Moss), examples of the sort of bands that played at house parties in those days.

=== Later years ===
After World War II Weaver recorded in New York and Atlanta, both as a solo artist and with McTell. His final recordings were in 1949. He worked for a railroad until he became blind in the 1950s.

He died of uremia in Covington, Georgia, in 1962, at the age of 56.

His daughter Cora Mae Bryant (May 1, 1926 – October 30, 2008) was also a blues musician.
