= Charley Lincoln =

American country blues musician (1900–1963)

- Born: Charlie Hicks, Jr. March 11, 1900; Lithonia, Georgia, U. S.
- Died: September 28, 1963 (aged 63) Cairo, Georgia, U. S.
- Genres: Country blues
- Occupations: Musician; songwriter
- Instruments: Vocals; guitar
- Years active: 1910s to 1955
- Label: Columbia

Charley Lincoln (born Charlie Hicks, Jr., March 11, 1900 – September 28, 1963), also known as Laughing Charley, was an American country blues musician. He often recorded with his brother Robert Hicks, who was billed as Barbecue Bob.

== Life and career ==
Hicks was born in Lithonia, Georgia. In his teens he was taught to play the guitar by Savannah Weaver, the mother of Curley Weaver, and performed in the Lithonia area until 1920. He moved to Atlanta, Georgia, and worked outside the field of music, occasionally performing with his brother. He recorded with his brother for Columbia Records from 1927 to 1930. An example is the duet "It Won't Be Long Now", with crosstalk, which the brothers recorded in Atlanta on November 5, 1927.

After Robert's early death in 1931, Charley continued to perform into the 1950s, as Charley Lincoln. From 1955 to 1963 he was imprisoned for murder in Cairo, Georgia, where he became a prisoner trustee. He died there of a cerebral hemorrhage on September 28, 1963. In 2017 the Killer Blues Headstone Project placed the headstone for Charlie Lincoln at Lincoln Cemetery in Atlanta, Georgia.

== See also ==
- List of blues musicians
- List of country blues musicians
- List of guitarists
- List of nicknames of blues musicians
- Yazoo Records

== Sources ==
- Harris, Sheldon (1994). Blues Who's Who. Rev ed. New York: Da Capo Press. ISBN 0-306-80155-8
