= Bill Myers =

Bill Myers may refer to:

- Bill Myers (author), American Christian author, film director and film producer
- Bill Myers (baseball), American Negro league catcher
- Bill Myers (musician), American musician
- Bill H. Myers, American actor

== See also ==
- William Myers (disambiguation)
