= William Myers =

William, Wil, Bill, or Billy Myers may refer to:

== Politics ==
- William Myers (British politician) (1854–1933), English politician
- William R. Myers (1836–1907), U.S. Representative from Indiana
- Doc Myers (William G. Myers, 1930–2010), American politician from Florida

== Sports ==
- Bill Myers (baseball) (1886–?), American baseball player
- Billy Myers (1910–1995), shortstop in Major League Baseball
- William James Myers (1937–2017), American wrestler better known as George Steele
- Wil Myers (born 1990), baseball player

== Others ==
- Sir William Myers, 1st Baronet (1750–1805), British soldier
- Sir William James Myers, 2nd Baronet (1783–1811), British soldier
- William Starr Myers (1877–1956), Princeton University professor and historian
- Bill Myers (musician), American musician
- Bill H. Myers, American actor
- Bill Myers (author) (born 1953), American author
- William Myers (lawyer) (born 1955), American lawyer
- Bill H. Myers (born 1956), American actor
- William Myers (design writer), American design historian and curator
- William Myers, character in The $5,000,000 Counterfeiting Plot
- William T. Myers, American philosopher

== See also ==
- William Meyers (1943–2014), South African boxer
- William Frederick Meyers, member of the Legislative Assembly of the Northwest Territories
- William Meyer (disambiguation)
