= Homer Fulcher =

American duck decoy carver

Homer Fulcher (May 28, 1918 – September 9, 1995) was a duck decoy carver from the Core Banks community of Stacy, North Carolina.

Eastern North Carolina's abundant waterfowl was considered one of its most valuable natural resources for generations. Flocks of hundreds of thousands of birds would shelter in the coastal marshes and pocosins and along the sounds. While the population has decreased significantly over the last century, many migratory birds still visit eastern North Carolina. As a result, the region draws many hunters and birdwatchers. This culture gave rise to a local tradition of decoy carving of which Fulcher was a notable practitioner.

Nature writer T. Edward Nickens describes the importance of the tradition:

"All skills necessary to wrest a living from the marshes, sound, and sea were brought to bear through decoy carving, waterfowl hunting, and guiding. The boatwright’s deft touch with a drawknife. The netter’s skill with line and knot. The sailor’s love of canvas. The fishermen’s intimate understanding of wind and tide. Who knows how many thousands of decoys were carved in a Core Sound work shed? To those old-timers, each wooden bird was little more than a tool. But today, we see these works of folk art as a prism, through which we can view a life lived close to the land and sea."

The town of Stacy is Carteret County's "decoy capital," having produced many notable decoy carvers. Fulcher described Stacy as "the carvingest community in Carteret County."

In 1995 the North Carolina Arts Council recognized Fulcher's contributions to the traditional art of decoy carving by honoring him with the North Carolina Folk Heritage Award in the Traditional Crafts and Visual Arts category, along with decoy expert Julian Hamilton, Jr.

Fulcher is cited in the Encyclopedia of American Folklife's entry on Regional Maritime Culture, which describes his work as having the "Core Sound touch," an aesthetic that emphasizes simplicity and a "rough" appearance.

Several other members of Fulcher's family have practiced the art of decoy carving, including Irving Russell Fulcher, whose work appears in the Ward Museum at Salisbury University.
