= Red Wilson =

Red Wilson may refer to:

- Red Wilson (baseball)
- Red Wilson (musician)
- Lynton Wilson, Canadian business executive
- Shirley Wilson, American football coach
