= Rhonda Gouge =

American bluegrass musician

- Born: 1955 (age 70–71)
- Origin: Ledger, Mitchell County, North Carolina, U.S.
- Genres: Traditional, gospel music, bluegrass music, christian music
- Occupations: gospel singer and musician
- Instruments: Vocals, banjo, guitar, mandolin, piano, bass, and fiddle

Rhonda Gouge (born 1955) is a bluegrass and gospel musician from Ledger, North Carolina. She is a recipient of the 2023 North Carolina Heritage Award.

== Music career ==
Gouge was born in McDowell County, North Carolina but has spent her whole life in Mitchell County. She was exposed to music at an early age through her family. She took piano lessons as a child, but always had a fascination for the guitar. She was finally gifted a guitar in 1967 by her father. This was the entry point for her interest in learning all kinds of musical instruments.

Gouge's musical mentor was fiddle and banjo player, Oscar "Red" Wilson, who received a North Carolina Heritage Award in 2003. She started accompanying him on guitar with his band, the Toe River Valley Boys.

Gouge began playing bass guitar in church at age twelve. She later started playing banjo and mandolin. Additionally she picked up lead, electric, and steel guitar. Her local community took notice of her interest in music and individuals started to request music lessons from her.

After years of working in the factory lines and also for Wilson's recording studio, she decided to started a recording studio of her own, The Picking Parlor. She teaches students in guitar, mandolin, bass, fiddle, banjo, and singing.

Gouge has performed with several gospel groups such as, the Rebel Creeks Quartet, and the Principles. She formed two groups of her own, the Bear Creek Ambassadors and, Rhonda and Keeping Time.

She currently is performing at her home church, Bear Creek Baptist Church, located in Ledger, North Carolina. She received her master's degree in Appalachian Studies from Appalachian State University.
