= Auman =

Auman is a surname. Notable people with the surname include:

- Dorothy Auman (died 1991), American potter
- Joseph M. Auman (1922–1942), American soldier
- William Auman (1838–1920), American general

== See also ==
- Aumann
