= Aaron Buff =

Chair maker

- Born: Burke County, North Carolina, U.S.
- Died: January 11, 1994 (aged 82); Mount Gilead Church Cemetery, Connelly Springs
- Occupation: Chair-maker
- Spouse: Vergie Leatherman Buff
- Parent(s): David Hull Buff (father), Cordelia Elizabeth Cook Buff

Aaron Buff (August 31, 1911 – January 11, 1994) was a state-acclaimed chair-maker who specialized in making slatback chairs with woven oak-spit seats, children's chairs and highchairs. His chairs have been purchased by the North Carolina Museum of History, and are also displayed at Hart Square in Hickory, North Carolina.

Buff was the recipient of the North Carolina Heritage Award presented by the North Carolina Arts Council in 1994 before his death.

== Awards received ==
- North Carolina Heritage Award (1994)
