= William Meyer =

William or Bill Meyer may refer to:

== Politics ==
- William H. Meyer (Colorado politician) (1847–1923), Lieutenant Governor of Colorado
- William H. Meyer (1914–1983), member of the U.S. House of Representatives
- William Stevenson Meyer (1860–1922), ICS officer and first High Commissioner for India

== Sports ==
- William Meyer (cricketer) (1883–1953), English cricketer
- Bill Meyer (basketball) (1943–2018), American basketball player
- Bill Meyer (water polo) (born 1958), Canadian water polo player
- Billy Meyer (1893–1957), American baseball player
- William Meyer (runner), American long-distance runner, 3rd in the 6 miles at the 1927 USA Outdoor Track and Field Championships

== Other ==
- William Meyer (Medal of Honor) (1863–1926), U.S. Navy sailor and Medal of Honor recipient
- Bill Meyer (artist) (born 1942), Australian artist

== See also ==
- William Mayer (disambiguation)
- William Meyers (1943–2014), South African boxer
- William Myers (disambiguation)
- Billy Meier
- Billmeyer, a German surname
