= Bertie Dickens =

North Carolinian old-time banjo player

Bertie Caudill Dickens (1902–1994) was an old-time banjo player from the community of Ennice in Alleghany County, North Carolina. Dickens was born in Grayson County, Virginia, but lived most of her life in Ennice.

Dickens was raised in a musical family. Her father, Sid Caudill, was a banjo player and her brothers, Huston, Joe, and Clell were fiddle and banjo players. Together, Sid and his sons operated a sawmill in what is now Felts Park, Galax, Virginia.

Bertie learned to play the fiddle and banjo as a young child, and played both the old-time clawhammer style as well as a two-finger, up-picking technique. Her style was described by fellow musician and friend Alice Gerrard as "sparse and beautiful, like Bert herself, with a classic dignity and sound."

She was married to Marvin Dickens (1899–1997). Together they had ten children, Helen, Harold, Howard, Ruth, Dean, Glen, Gelene, Don, George, and stillborn.

There are a number of audio recordings of Dickens performing, including field tapes within the Southern Folklife Collection's Alice Gerrard Collection. Dickens is also featured in the North Carolina Banjo Collection compilation, released by Rounder Records in 1998. The Rounder compilation includes one track by Dickens titled "Cleveland's Marching To The White House," which was recorded by Wayne Martin in Alleghany County on August 9, 1988. Dickens also appears alongside Dan Williams and her brother, Joe Caudill, on the compilation, Alleghany County musicians: Past and Present, released by Alleghany County Sesquicentennial Committee in 2009.

In 1992 Dickens received the North Carolina Heritage Award, an annual award given out by the North Carolina Arts Council, an agency of the North Carolina Department of Natural and Cultural Resources, in recognition of traditional artists from the U.S. state of North Carolina.
