= Songcatcher =

- Theatrical release poster
- Directed by: Maggie Greenwald
- Written by: Maggie Greenwald
- Produced by: Ellen Rigas Venetis; Richard Miller
- Starring: Janet McTeer; Aidan Quinn; Michael Davis; Michael Goodwin; Jane Adams; E. Katherine Kerr; Emmy Rossum; Pat Carroll
- Cinematography: Enrique Chediak
- Edited by: Keith Reamer
- Music by: David Mansfield
- Distributed by: Lions Gate Films (United States and Canada); United Artists Films (International)
- Release dates: January 25, 2000 (Sundance); June 15, 2001 (United States)
- Running time: 109 minutes
- Country: United States
- Language: English
- Budget: $1.8 million
- Box office: $3 million

Songcatcher is a 2000 American drama film written and directed by Maggie Greenwald. It is about a musicologist researching and collecting Appalachian folk music in the mountains of western North Carolina. Although Songcatcher is a fictional film, it is loosely based on the work of Olive Dame Campbell, founder of the John C. Campbell Folk School in Brasstown, North Carolina, and that of the English folk song collector Cecil Sharp, portrayed at the end of the film as professor Cyrus Whittle. The film grossed $3 million in limited theatrical release in the United States, which was generally considered as a respectable result for an arthouse film release in 2001.

== Plot ==
In 1907, Dr. Lily Penleric, a professor of musicology, is denied a promotion at the university where she teaches. She impulsively visits her sister Eleanor, who runs a struggling rural school in Appalachia. There, she discovers a treasure trove of traditional English and Scotch-Irish ballads, which have been preserved by the secluded mountain people since the colonial period of the 1600s and 1700s. Lily decides to record and transcribe the songs and share them with the outside world.

With the help of a musically talented orphan named Deladis Slocumb, Lily ventures into isolated areas of the mountains to collect the songs. She finds herself increasingly enchanted, not only by the rugged purity of the music, but also by the courage and endurance of the local people as they carve out meaningful lives against the harsh conditions. She becomes privy to their struggles to save their land from Earl Giddens, representative of a coal mining company. At the same time, Lily is troubled when she finds that Eleanor is engaged in a lesbian love affair with her co-teacher at the school.

Lily meets Tom Bledsoe, a handsome, hardened war veteran and talented musician. Despite some initial suspicion from Tom that Lily is exploiting his community's traditions, they grow attracted to one another and soon begin a love affair. She experiences a slow change in both her perception of the mountain people as savage and uncouth, and of her sister's sexuality as immoral.

Events come to a crisis when a young man discovers Eleanor and her lover, Harriet, kissing in the woods. That night, two men set fire to the school building, burning Eleanor, Harriet, and Deladis out of their home and destroying Lily's transcriptions of the ballads and her phonograph recordings. Rather than starting over again, Lily decides to leave, but she convinces Tom and Deladis to "go down the mountain" with her to make and sell phonograph recordings of mountain music. As they depart, Cyrus Whittle, a renowned professor from England, arrives on a collection foray of his own, ensuring that the ballads will be preserved in the manner that Lily had originally intended.

== Cast ==
- Janet McTeer as Professor Lily Penleric
- Aidan Quinn as Tom Bledsoe
- Michael Davis as Dean Arthur Pembroke
- Michael Goodwin as Professor Wallace Aldrich
- Greg Russell Cook as Fate Honeycutt
- Jane Adams as Eleanor Penleric
- E. Katherine Kerr as Harriet Tolliver
- Emmy Rossum as Deladis Slocumb
- Pat Carroll as Viney Butler
- Stephanie Roth Haberle as Alice Kincaid
- Bart Hansard as Hilliard
- Erin Blake Clanton as Polly
- David Patrick Kelly as Earl Giddens
- Kristin Hall as Isabel
- Michael Harding as Reese Kincaid
- Taj Mahal as Dexter Speaks
- Muse Watson as Parley Gentry
- Iris DeMent as Rose Gentry
- Rhoda Griffis as Clementine McFarland
- Steve Boles as Ambrose McFarland
- Taylor Hayes as Reverend Merriweather
- Josh Goforth as Will
- Don Pedi as Barn Band – Dulcimer
- Sheila Kay Adams as Barn Band – Banjo
- Bobby McMillon as Singer at Barn Dance
- Hazel Dickens as Singer at Barn Dance
- Andrea Powell as Josie Moore
- Danny Nelson as Uncle Cratis
- David Ducey as Postman Johnson
- Steven Sutherland as Cyrus Whittle
- Shawn Lindsay as Dancer at Barn Dance

== Production ==
Producer Ellen Rigas invested $3 million in Songcatcher which her family borrowed as part of the Adelphia Communications fraud.

== Inspiration and historical accuracy ==
While the film's producers portray the movie as a work of fiction and include the standard "any similarity to actual persons, living or dead, or to actual events is purely coincidental" disclaimer in the film's credits, virtually all commentators agree that the basic story—stripped of its romantic and post-modern trappings—is inspired by real events, and follows quite closely the song collecting activities of Olive Dame Campbell (1882–1954) in the southern Appalachians from 1909 onwards, although with some differences, presumably inserted for dramatic effect: the real Olive Dame Campbell was not a professional musicologist or college professor (Betty Smith, in a 2003 review of the movie, points out that those characteristics instead echo those of Dorothy Scarborough, who visited the mountains in search of folksongs in 1930); Campbell made her transcriptions without the aid of a recording machine; and she already had a husband, the educator and social reformer John Charles Campbell at the time of her collecting, which was in fact initially a spin-off of a 1909 trip funded by a grant from the recently established Russell Sage Foundation to enable John to study the area's social and cultural conditions in hopes of improving their school systems. Nevertheless, the concept of ballads collected by "Lily Penleric" closely parallels those collected by Campbell (whose exposure to this particular seam of song commenced with hearing "Barbara Allen" sung by a "Miss Ada B. Smith" at Hindman School in Knott County, Kentucky) and ultimately, passed to Cecil Sharp ("Cyrus Whittle" in the film) for his interest, although their first in-person meeting (arranged at Campbell's behest) occurred in suburban Massachusetts in 1915, not on the slopes of an Appalachian mountain. Interestingly, despite the disclaimer in the movie credits mentioned above, the sentence "The filmmakers gratefully acknowledge the work of Olive Dame Campbell and Cecil J. Sharp" does also occur as a separate acknowledgment therein. Following his 1915 meeting with Campbell, at which she showed him her collection of over 200 ballads, Sharp (together with his assistant Maud Karpeles) planned and carried out his own song collecting expeditions in Appalachia, which occurred over the period 1916–1918.

The results of Campbell and Sharp's respective work were ultimately made publicly available in a groundbreaking 1917 publication "English Folk Songs from Southern Appalachia" which exposed for the first time the persistence of such folk songs, of Scotch-Irish origin, in the repertoires of the residents of the remote Appalachian mountains, and whose effects have resonated through the succeeding years into the folk song revival of the 1950s to the present day; in addition, performers such as Mary Jane Queen, whom Greenwald consulted when researching the film and on whom the character of Viney Butler was based, lived until 2007, having received a number of awards for her continued folk heritage activities. (Queen was born in 1914, later than when the fictional events are set, thus to be strictly chronological the character would overlap more with the lifespans of her mother or grandmother, who were also noted local musicians).

Betty Smith, whose review of the movie is mentioned above, states that the character Alice Kincaid, the poor woman with the philandering husband whose artwork Lily appreciates and finds buyers for, is "surely" modelled after Emma Bell Miles, an Appalachian mountain resident who lived in poor circumstances with a large family who found some local fame as a writer, poet, and artist before dying of tuberculosis at the age of 39. Smith goes on to note that the actual watercolors attributed to Alice in the movie were created by Appalachian artist Elizabeth Ellison of Bryson City, who also worked on the set.

== Soundtrack ==
Songcatcher: Music from and Inspired by the Motion Picture

Soundtrack album by various artists
- Released: January 23, 2001
- Genres: Country; Film score
- Label: Vanguard
- Producer: David Mansfield

Professional ratings
Review scores
Source	Rating
AllMusic	link

The film's score was written by David Mansfield, who also assembled a roster of female country music artists to perform mostly traditional mountain ballads. Some of the songs are contemporary arrangements, and some are played in the traditional Appalachian music style. The artists include Rosanne Cash, Emmylou Harris, Maria McKee, Dolly Parton, Gillian Welch and Patty Loveless. Singers Emmy Rossum, Iris DeMent, and Hazel Dickens, who appeared in the film, are also featured on the soundtrack.

The soundtrack album inspired the 2002 follow-up album by Vanguard Records, Songcatcher II: The Tradition That Inspired the Movie, that compiled recordings of some of the songs selected for the film as performed by authentic Appalachian artists. The recordings are mostly from the 1960s, out of the Vanguard vaults.

=== Track listing ===
1. "Fair and Tender Ladies" (Traditional, performed by Rosanne Cash) – 2:56
2. "Pretty Saro" (Traditional, performed by Iris DeMent) – 2:54
3. "When Love Is New" (Composed and performed by Dolly Parton) – 5:16
4. "Barbara Allen" (Traditional, performed by Emmy Rossum) – 0:43
5. "Barbara Allen" (Traditional, performed by Emmylou Harris) – 4:35
6. "Moonshiner" (Traditional, performed by Allison Moorer) – 3:34
7. "Sounds of Loneliness" (Composed by Patty Ramey, performed by Patty Loveless) – 3:44
8. "All My Tears" (Composed and performed by Julie Miller) – 3:11
9. "Mary of the Wild Moor" (Traditional, performed by Sara Evans) – 3:51
10. "Wayfaring Stranger (Traditional, Maria McKee) – 3:24
11. "Wind and Rain" (Traditional, performed by Gillian Welch and David Rawlings) – 3:25
12. "The Cuckoo Bird" (Traditional, performed by Deana Carter) – 3:33
13. "Score Suite # 1" (Composed by David Mansfield) – 5:01
14. "Conversation With Death" (Traditional, performed by Hazel Dickens) – 3:01
15. "Score Suite # 2" (Composed by David Mansfield) – 4:58
16. "Single Girl" (Traditional, performed by Pat Carroll) – 1:04

=== Chart performance ===
Chart (2001)	Peak position
U.S. Billboard Top Country Albums	42
U.S. Billboard Top Independent Albums	31

== Reception ==
The review aggregation website Rotten Tomatoes reported a 74% approval rating with an average rating of 6.34/10 based on 88 reviews. The website's consensus reads, "The story may be a bit too melodramatic, but great performances abound in Songcatcher. The real reason to see the movie, however, is the hypnotic music." Metacritic assigned a score of 63 out of 100, based on 27 critics, indicating "generally favorable reviews".

== Accolades ==
It was nominated for two Independent Spirit Awards.

== See also ==
- Folk music
- Alan Lomax
- Loraine Wyman – a popular songcatcher of the same historical period
- Anthology of American Folk Music
- Folk music revival
