= Arliss =

Arliss may refer to:

- Arliss (given name), a list of people and fictional characters with the given name or nickname
- Arliss (surname), a list of people with the surname
- Arliss (TV series), stylized as Arli$$, a sitcom airing on HBO from 1996 to 2002

== See also ==
- Arlis (disambiguation)
- Arles, a French city and commune
- Arless, an Irish village
- Kingdom of Arles, a medieval kingdom
