= Netterberg =

Netterberg is a surname. Notable people with the surname include:

- Hanna Netterberg (born 1983), Swedish politician
- Pontus Netterberg, Swedish ice hockey player

== See also ==
- Nattenberg-Stadion
- Netter
- Berg
