= Susan Morgan Leveille =

American textile artist

Susan Morgan Leveille (born 1949) is a weaver and teacher from Dillsboro, North Carolina. Part of a long line of weavers and educators in the state, Morgan has been a central figure in the craft movement in western North Carolina. In 2014 Leveille received a North Carolina Heritage Award from the North Carolina Arts Council in honor of her work.

Leveille is the niece of Lucy Calista Morgan, the founder of the Penland School of Crafts. Susan Morgan Levielle began studying at the Penland School as a child, before attending the University of Tennessee in Knoxville and the Arrowmont School of Arts and Crafts in Gatlinburg. She is a practitioner of overshot weaving, a technique taught at the Penland School and long practiced among craft communities in the mountains of North Carolina. In addition to her work as part of craft revival and education, she owns and runs a gallery in Dillsboro where she promotes the work of other artists in the region.

Leveille is a former president and lifetime member of the Southern Highland Craft Guild, a guild craft organization that has partnered with the National Park Service for over fifty years. She has taught at the Penland School of Crafts, the John C. Campbell Folk School, and numerous other important craft centers. She is also one of the co-founders of the Stecoah Valley Weavers, a guild in the Stecoah Valley of Robbinsville, North Carolina, which has a mission of economic and individual development.

She is an author of the book Gift from the hills: Miss Lucy Morgan's story of her unique Penland School.
