= Senora Lynch =

- Born: Senora Richardson Lynch; 1963 (age 62–63)
- Known for: Pottery
- Awards: North Carolina Heritage Award

Senora Richardson Lynch (born 1963) is a contemporary Native American potter and a member of the Haliwa-Saponi tribe. She was a 2007 winner of the North Carolina Heritage Award, the 2013 recipient of the Lifetime Achievement Award from the River People Music and Culture Fest, and is recognized nationally for unique style of detailed, hand-coiled pottery. Lynch is a resident of Warren County, North Carolina.

== Art career ==
Lynch began making pottery at the age of fourteen after seeing ancient pottery shards and assisting with a pottery class for Haliwa-Saponi tribal elders. She works with red and white clay and uses a traditional hand-coiling method which she makes her own by etching geometric patterns onto the surface. Lynch's pottery has been on display at the White House and the National Museum of Women in the Arts in Washington, DC. She has work on permanent display at the North Carolina Museum of History and in the National Museum of the American Indian's collection.

She claims that working with clay brings her back to when she was a child and played with the mud. Her inspiration for the designs she makes come from the night sky and through dreams.

Lynch teaches pottery, beading, basketry, and loom work. She also makes traditional regalia such as necklaces, earrings, chokers, leather bags, and dance sticks. She also travels throughout the state of North Carolina, teaching cultural presentations and workshops at University of North Carolina at Greensboro, and traditional pottery techniques at East Carolina University. Lynch also worked with students in Halifax County to create a mural at the Haliwa-Saponi Tribal School through the North Carolina Arts Council's Traditional Arts Program (TAPS). She also does week-long residencies with fourth grade students during the winter months.

In 2004, Lynch began a brickwork piece at The University of North Carolina at Chapel Hill that she later completed in 2014. The piece, called "The Gift" incorporates imagery from Native American storytelling and the natural world. Some of her work is in the Smithsonian Museum in D.C. The gift's imagery includes turtles, eagle feather, dogwood flowers, hills, water, and corn.

Her work is currently also marketed online in the website American Indian Made in North Carolina. Her work is now gaining international demand. She hold a year-round class and she teachers her students about American Indians and about culture, but she also teaches her students to work to overcome racial stereotypes.
