= Tony Williamson (disambiguation) =

Tony Williamson may refer to:

- Tony Williamson (1932–1991), British television writer
- Tony Tallarico (born 1933), comic book artist who used the pseudonym "Tony Williamson"
- Tony Williamson (musician), mandolin player
