= David zum Brunnen =

American actor (born 1963)

David zum Brunnen (born December 30, 1963) is an American actor primarily known for his leading portrayals in public television national broadcasts. The broadcasts - specifically War Bonds: The Songs & Letters of WWII (2007/2008 - American Public Television, APT) and The Night Before Christmas Carol (2010 - National Educational Television Association, NETA) - have enjoyed continued airing in public television markets since they first appeared.

Zum Brunnen is also known for his appearances in national touring theatrical productions throughout the country and regionally for portrayals including Charles Dickens (and numerous other characters) in Dr. Elliot Engel’s The Night Before Christmas Carol, War Bonds: The Songs & Letters of World War II, among others.

In 2023, David starred in a drama film, The Problem of the Hero, directed by Shaun Dozier.

He is Co-Founder & Producing Director of EbzB Productions, based out of North Carolina, where he resides with his family in Chatham County. Though known for his televised and theatrical portrayals, he has also become established as a leading arts activist in the state of North Carolina over the last two decades, where he has also served in leadership roles in statewide arts advocacy efforts and in political campaigns for elected state and local officials (including stints as Board and Advocacy Chair for Arts North Carolina, and as campaign manager for former North Carolina State Senator Bob Atwater)
