= Billmeier =

Billmeier is a surname. Notable people with the surname include:

- Craig Billmeier (born 1973), American musician
- Grant Billmeier (born 1984), European basketball player and coach
- Sarah Billmeier, Austrian para-alpine skier

== See also ==
- Billmeyer
