= McGee and Me! =

- Cover of VHS release of the first episode
- Genre: Children, Spiritual, Educational
- Created by: Ken C. Johnson; Bill Myers
- Starring: Joseph Dammann; Sarah Dammann; Terry Bozeman; Vaughn Taylor
- Voices of: Ken C. Johnson
- Composer: James Covell
- Country of origin: United States
- Original language: English
- No. of episodes: 12 (+1 special)

Production
- Executive producer: Dan Johnson
- Producers: George Taweel; Rob Loos
- Cinematography: Timothy Eaton
- Editor: Rod Stephens
- Running time: 30 minutes
- Production companies: Focus on the Family; Living Bibles International; Tyndale Productions

Original release
- Release: June 4, 1989 – June 11, 1995

McGee and Me! is an American Christian television series created by Ken C. Johnson and Bill Myers. The series premiered on June 4, 1989, spanning twelve episodes and one special until its conclusion on June 11, 1995. Each half-hour-long episode centers on Nick, his cartoon friend, McGee, and the moral lessons they learn as Nick grows up after moving to a new town. McGee and Me! deals with issues such as honesty ("The Big Lie"), bullying ("Skate Expectations"), and faith in God ("Twister and Shout").

== Premise ==
McGee and Me! stars Nicholas "Nick" Martin, an 11-year-old aspiring artist and cartoonist who lives with his family in the town of Eastfield, Indiana. His father, David, is a newspaper journalist while his mother, Elizabeth, works at a counseling center. Nick, his parents, his older sister Sarah, and their younger sister Jamie, all first move to Eastfield in the first episode, moving into their grandmother's house to live with her. Nick often spends his time drawing and conversing with his imaginary friend, an animated cartoon character named McGee, who has wacky adventures of his own and serves as Nick's constant companion and confidant. Nick's life is constantly challenged by worldly trials and tribulations that put his morals and convictions to the test, with Nick learning valuable lessons along the way and, at times, facing the consequences of his actions.

His friends include Louis Armstrong, a streetwise kid and Nick's best friend, Renee Johnson, a pretty girl and a good student who hangs out with Nick and Louis, Phillip Monroe, a young "nerdy" boy in Nick's class who's very smart and sometimes picked on by older kids, and, in the last two episodes, Jordan Michaels, an athletic football-playing student who's also into computer graphics. In the first nine episodes, Nick's main adversary is Derrick Cryder, a bully who constantly picks on Nick, Phillip, and other kids, but by the end of the Christmas episode, he reforms when he saves Nick from a gang member after Nick shows him kindness. Derrick later serves as a voice of reason for Nick in Episode 12 after Nick strains his friendship with his other friends.

The first nine episodes feature Nick in waning years of elementary school, while the final three episodes, titled The New Adventures of McGee and Me!, see Nick enter junior high school. The actors at the time were much older than their characters' ages, giving Nick the appearance of a high schooler instead, due to the final three episodes having been produced a couple of years after the first nine.

== Cast ==
=== Martin family ===
- Joseph Dammann as Nicholas "Nick" Martin: The series' protagonist. A kid cartoonist who regularly faces moral decisions in everyday life.
- Ken C. Johnson as voice of McGee: Nick's goofy cartoon creation, conscience, and imaginary friend. Though he often provides Nick with good advice, he also sometimes gets Nick into trouble. McGee is also the star of the series' animated segments, some of which represent glimpses of Nick's imagination. Ken C. Johnson also voices all other animated characters in the series.
- Terry Bozeman as David Martin: Nick's father. He works as a newspaper journalist. David and his wife are often trying to set a good example for their kids, guiding Nick along the way to do what's right and follow God's plan. In "Take Me Out of the Ball Game", he briefly becomes obsessed with winning a Little League Baseball championship game, putting all his faith in the team's star player in hopes of beating the opposing team, which happened to be coached by a rival of his. David learns a hard lesson about payback and misplaced faith when his team loses the game as a result.
- Vaughn Taylor as Elizabeth Martin: Nick's mother. She works at a counseling center. Like her husband, Liz wants to raise her kids on a righteous path and helps to guide Nick to do the right things. In "A Star in the Breaking", she learns a lesson in humility when she discovers that the job she was hoping to get at the counseling center turns out to be for secretarial work answering phone calls.
- Sarah Dammann as Sarah Martin: Nick's older sister. She often picks on Nick as older siblings do, but ultimately has a good heart and, at times, advises Nick to make good choices when she sees him succumbing to negative influences. She is played by Joseph Dammann's actual sister.
- Chelsea Hertford as Jamie Martin: Nick's younger sister. She looks up to Nick for his artistic skills, but can sometimes act like a brat. When Nick becomes conceited for being chosen to be on a game show in the episode "A Star in the Breaking", his rude behavior puts off his other friends and he yells at Jamie, but in the end, she is the first and only one willing to forgive him.
- Eve Brenner as Grandma Martin: Nick's grandmother, whom the family lives with. In "Back to the Drawing Board", she helps Nick to put aside his jealousy of his artistic classmate, Todd Burton, and to focus on what he and Todd have in common.
- Poundcake as Whatever: The Martin family dog. Whatever often gets into things he shouldn't be. Despite McGee being from Nick's imagination, Whatever can see and interact with him too, with McGee even scaring off Whatever a few times.

=== Nick's friends ===
- Brent Kelly as Louis Armstrong: Nick's smooth-talking, wise-guy best friend. He befriends Nick after saving him from nearly getting beaten up by Derrick in the first episode. He is unsure about his faith and has a tendency to exaggerate the truth about things, but generally tries to be a good friend to Nick. While his last name is never given in the show or its credits, when his parents debut in Episode 8, they are each given the surname of "Armstrong", making Louis' name a pun based on Louis Armstrong (but with Louis's first name spoken like "Lewis" instead of "Louie"). Louis doesn't appear in The New Adventures series, having apparently moved from Eastfield to Indianapolis between Episodes 9 and 10, but does still keep in touch with Nick, as evidenced by Nick conversing with him over the telephone in "Beauty in the Least".
- Johnny Green as Derrick Cryder: A bully that Nick regularly has problems with. Derrick is initially presented as violent and malicious, willing to beat up anyone who crosses him and prone to threatening others. He and Nick are constantly at odds throughout the first nine episodes, but Derrick reforms by the end of the Christmas episode after Nick shows him compassion. He ends up saving Nick's life when Nick is attacked by gang member Ray, whom Derrick fights off. In Episode 12, Derrick watches Nick from afar and confronts him when he sees Nick has forsaken his friends for a new crew, who send Nick down the wrong path, with Derrick becoming the voice of reason for Nick, and helping him make up with his real friends.
- Shaylisa Hurte as Renee Johnson: Another friend and classmate of both Nick and Louis. She is pretty, smart, a good student, and has the ability to match wits with Derrick's snark and bullying, snapping back at him with quips and comebacks that put him in his place. Her parents divorced when she was 10 years old, with her father moving out to California.
- Whitby Hertford as Phillip Monroe: Introduced as a school geek who frequently gets picked on by Derrick. He eventually becomes another friend of Nick and Renee. By The New Adventures, he has become a fully-fledged member of Nick's circle of friends, along with Renee and Jordan. While Derrick is no longer a bully at this point, Phillip still feels intimidated by him, as seen in "The Blunder Years". His actor, Whit Hertford, is the real-life brother of Jamie's actress, Chelsea Hertford.
- Sonny Kelly as Jordan Michaels: Another friend of Nick's who replaces Louis for The New Adventures episodes (fittingly, Sonny Kelly is the younger brother of Louis' actor Brent). Jordan plays on the junior high's football team and is into computer graphics. He has an easygoing, sarcastic personality but also strong sense of loyalty.

=== Other characters ===
- John Paul Sipla as Troy: The most frequently seen of Derrick's crew of bullies. Troy appears in "The Big Lie", "Skate Expectations", "Back to the Drawing Board" (in an uncredited appearance), and "Take Me Out of the Ball Game"; the latter of which being the first and only time he is credited with an actual name, as his previous appearances credited him only as "Derrick's Dork".
- Linda Dangcil as Mrs. Harmon: The elementary school teacher of Nick, Louis, Renee, Phillip, and Derrick. She is caring and considerate and wants her students to succeed and always give their best at what they do. She is first mentioned as Nick's teacher in "A Star in the Breaking", but does not actually appear until "Skate Expectations". She reveals in "Twas the Fight Before Christmas" that Derrick had previously failed her class the year before and that this is currently his second year taking her class. She also appears in "Back to the Drawing Board" and "Do the Bright Thing".
- Joe Bonny as Coach Gus Slayter: He is the elementary school's gym teacher and football coach. A large, intimidating man, Nick claims that the students actually really like him because "[they] were afraid not to". In the first episode, he catches Nick standing in the hall trying to find his homeroom class, and mistakenly thinks Nick is playing hooky. Later, when some boys make graffiti of Coach Slayter at recess, they pass their spray paint cans off to Nick, whom Coach Slayter sees with the cans and assumes Nick was the one who made the graffiti. In Episode 2, Coach Slayter substitutes for Mrs. Harmon in her absence, during which he is revealed to be somewhat illiterate, struggling with the word "Aluminum" before he decides to postpone the class's spelling test in favor of him telling the students about one of his football plays. He appears only in the first two episodes.
- Stephen Burks as Mr. Oliver: The elementary school's principal. He first appears in "A Star in the Breaking", in which he walks in on Nick's class as Coach Slayter is substituting to congratulate Nick on his getting chosen to appear on the game show Trash TV, and that he and the others will be rooting for him to win. In "Twas the Fight Before Christmas", he informs Mrs. Harmon about Derrick's having some serious problems at home, which would explain Derrick's recent misbehavior and lack of showing up to rehearsals for the school's Christmas pageant. Mr. Oliver only appears in these two episodes.
- Robert Crow as Bob Armstrong: Louis's father. In "Take Me Out of the Ball Game", he and his wife attend Louis and Nick's little league baseball games. In "Twas the Fight Before Christmas" Bob and his wife both attend the school's Christmas pageant and assist with the pageant's rehearsals.
- Connie Fredericks as Barbara Armstrong: Louis's mother. In "Take Me Out of the Ball Game", she and her husband attend Louis and Nick's little league baseball games. In "Twas the Fight Before Christmas" Barbara and her husband both attend the school's Christmas pageant and assist with the pageant's rehearsals.
- Amy Allen as Carol Johnson: Renee's mother who works as a member of the press, possibly with Nick's father. Carol has allowed her faith to wane, as she mentions having not prayed in a while, presumably since her divorce. She appears only in "Twister and Shout".
- John Sanderford as Ted Johnson: Renee's father and Carol's ex-husband. Ted and Carol divorced when Renee was ten, with Ted moving out of Eastfield over to California. Since then, Ted hasn't gotten to spend much time with Renee and, much to Renee's chagrin, dotes on her too much when the two of them go on a mountain climbing trip together with Nick, Phillip, and their fathers. He appears only in the episode "In the Nick of Time".
- Jerry Houser as Phil Monroe: Phillip's father. He is a fun-loving practical joker who loves to play pranks on people, but his son does not share his same sense of humor. He appears only in the episode "In the Nick of Time".
- Carol Lawrence as Mrs. Pryce: The principal of Eastfield Junior High, which is attended by Nick, Renee, Phillip, Jordan and Derrick. Mrs. Pryce, herself, also attended the school twenty-five years ago, alongside both of Nick's parents. She appears only in "The Blunder Years".

=== Guest characters ===
- Frank Sotonoma Salsedo as George Ravenhill: An elderly Native American who lives in an old, rundown house in the neighborhood. Louis tells Nick rumors about Mr. Ravenhill, that he's "a crazy Indian" who eats live animals, and that anything that goes into his house never comes back out. According to Nick's grandmother, Mr. Ravenhill is actually a sweet old man who takes care of injured animals, and that his house is in such bad shape because he has arthritis so bad that he can barely get himself around. He appears only in "The Big Lie".
- Jimmy Aleck as Bill Banter: Host of the TV game show Trash TV, which features messy competitions in the style of the Nickelodeon game show Double Dare. He and the show only appear in "A Star in the Breaking".
- Stacey Storr as Amy Packer: She is the Trash TV contestant who was picked to be on the show along with Nick. She and Nick compete against each other in the game show's events, with Nick besting Amy in the first event, but Amy defeats Nick in every one of the remaining challenges, making her the winner. She only appears in "A Star in the Breaking" (in which she has no lines of dialogue).
- Curtis Graham as Andy: A friend of Sarah's with whom she wants to go play miniature golf instead of babysitting a neighbor's daughter in "Skate Expectations" (his only appearance). Andy also has a brother named Patrick who, presumably, attends school with Nick.
- Chris Demetral as Todd Burton: A new student who moves to Eastfield and joins Nick's class in "Back to the Drawing Board" (his only appearance). Like Nick, he is an aspiring artist and draws his own cartoon character, a large robot named Jawbreaker. Nick becomes jealous of Todd's talents when he sees all the other kids, including Derrick, liking Todd's Jawbreaker drawings instead of his own drawings of McGee. McGee also faces off against Jawbreaker in an animated fantasy sequence, but McGee is able to outwit the brutish robot. After receiving some advice from his grandmother, Nick is able to put aside his jealousy and make peace with Todd, with the two developing a mutual respect for each other's talents.
- Dick Van Patten as Graham: Owner of Graham's Art Store, where he has an art table in stock that Nick considers purchasing in "Do the Bright Thing" (his only appearance). He has a friendly personality and a good sense of humor.
- Herb Mitchell as Harvey Stover: An arrogant and competitive little league coach, he manages the Freeland Dodgers during the All State Regional Championship, playing against Nick and his father's team, the Eastfield Braves. He had also managed the team that beat the Braves in the previous year, a fact that gets under the skin of Nick's father, David. Harvey and David have a rivalry between each other that is never resolved, but after the Braves lose to the Dodgers, David makes peace with his team's defeat while Harvey celebrates his team's victory. Harvey appears only in "Take Me Out of the Ball Game".
- Jenson Chapman as Thurman Miller: The thirteen-year-old pitcher and star player of the Eastfield Braves. He is cocky and confident, sure of his ability as the best batter on the team. So much so that David even puts all of his faith on Thurman to win the championship games for the Braves. Nick, too, even looks up to Thurman, willing to do favors for him like a servant. In the end, Thurman is struck out of the game, losing it for the Braves, much to his, David's and Nick's shock. He appears only in "Take Me Out of the Ball Game".
- Orel Hershiser as Himself: The pitcher of the Los Angeles Dodgers, he appears in the fantasy sequence in which Nick imagines himself as a home run hitter, "Slam 'The Man' Martin". In the sequence, Hershiser pitches to Nick, who makes the hit but the ball is caught and thrown to first base before Nick can run. Hershiser then runs up to the disappointed Nick to remind him that "It takes a whole team to win a game." He appears, as a special guest star, in "Take Me Out of the Ball Game".
- Jonathan Michaels as Ray: A gang member whom Derrick starts working for, Ray is cold and cruel, having allowed Derrick to tag along with his gang since he was a punk. Nick first encounters Ray when he goes to check on Derrick at his home, where Ray soon shows up to pick up Derrick. When Ray sees Nick, he threatens him. On the night of the Christmas pageant, Ray confronts Derrick about his having gone to perform in the play instead of meeting with Ray to help him break into a warehouse. Derrick begs Ray to let him out of the gang and Ray complies, but threatens Derrick's life if Ray ever sees him again. When Ray later catches Nick walking down the street, Ray grabs Nick and tosses him into an alley. Before Ray can attack, Derrick tackles Ray, leading to a brutal fight. Ray manages to get away after Derrick fights him off. Ray appears only in "Twas the Fight Before Christmas".
- Grant Goodeve as Brad "Giff" Gifford: Giff is the senior guide for Wilderness Excursions with Dad, a mountain climbing/wilderness survival program that Nick, Renee, Phillip, and their fathers all participate in. Giff guides the group and helps Nick to overcome his fear of heights when mountain climbing. He appears only in the episode "In the Nick of Time".
- Marguerita Franco as Consuela "Connie": Giff's co-leader. Connie helps guide the group on their mountain climbing trip and teaches them about wilderness survival. She appears only in the episode "In the Nick of Time".
- Bobby Jacobi as Rex Rogers: The most popular guy at Eastfield Junior High, Rex is a sunglasses-wearing, slang-speaking dude who tries to show Nick how to be "cool", at the expense of Nick forsaking his family and friends. Rex plays by his own rules and looks down upon those he sees as "geeks" (like Phillip) and "wannabes" (like Renee and Jordan), but it is shown that Rex feels intimidated by Derrick. He appears only in "The Blunder Years".
- Jenny McClintock as Babs Jenkins: A member of Rex's sunglasses-wearing posse. She sits near Nick in their Spanish class. Babs is just as stuck up and rude as Rex is, as well as shallow in her wanting to show off her expensive outfit. She appears only in "The Blunder Years".
- Suzanne Longo as Jessica Doll: Another sunglasses-wearing member of Rex's group. She appears only in "The Blunder Years".
- Bogdan Gheorghe as Ilia "Ilie" Tinescu: Ilie is Nick's young pen pal from Romania, whom Nick has been writing to for four years. He and his father make an unexpected arrival at the Martin's house while the two are in America for a relief mission, and are allowed to stay with the Martins. However, Ilie's enthusiasm about America and everything in Nick's house begins to annoy both Nick and his family. When Nick thinks that the Tinescus have left because of his and his family's ill behavior, he runs out to go looking for them. It turns out that Ilie and his dad had actually left to do some relief work, and return to the Martins' house just in time for Thanksgiving dinner, having invited many guests with more food to share with everyone. Nick apologizes to Ilie and gives him his giant model airplane. Ilie appears only in "Beauty in the Least".
- Adam Gregor as Michael Tinescu: Ilia's father. He works for a relief organization that sends him to America, where he and his son meet and stay with Nick and his family. He is a very religious man who knows the Bible very well. Michael tries to make himself useful by trying to fix the Martins' broken doorbell and offering to go to the store to get groceries. He and Ilie make a sudden departure from the Martins to participate in a back alley mission and soup kitchen for the poor, where Michael plays the guitar while Ilie hands out food to people. The two return in time for Thanksgiving dinner with a crowd of invited guests with more food to share with everyone. Michael appears only in "Beauty in the Least".
- Alan Johnson as James "Crazy Jim" Tillman III: An eccentric homeless man (he prefers the term "gentleman of reduced means") whom Michael Tinescu and Ilia befriend. They encounter James when Nick shows them the way to the grocery store on his way to school. James later comes to the Back Alley Mission & Soup Kitchen hosted by the Tinescus, even later shows up at the Martins' house with a plate of food for Thanksgiving.
- Kassie Wesley as Julia, the Mailperson: The Martins' mail carrier. Julia is brought into the Martins' house to meet them by Ilie, having never actually met them before. Nick later bumps into her by accident when he's out looking for Ilie and his father. Julia later shows up at the Martins' house, out of uniform in her normal clothes, having been invited for Thanksgiving dinner by the Tinescus along with many others, bringing a plate of food with her. Julia only appears in "Beauty in the Least".

== TV airings ==
On January 25, 1992, ABC aired "The Big Lie" as a pilot for a possible series run. The episode aired as part of the ABC Weekend Specials series yet ABC spokeswoman Janice Gretemeyer stated that the episode had been edited to allow for commercials, and to remove specific Christian references. Another episode, "Take Me Out of the Ball Game" aired as part of the ABC Weekend Specials series on September 12.

The entire series has aired on the Trinity Broadcasting Network and on TBN's children network Smile of a Child, but stopped airing sometime before April 2012.

== Episodes ==
=== McGee and Me! (1989–1990) ===
1. "The Big Lie" - Eleven-year-old Nick, along with his parents and 14-year-old sister Sarah and little sister Jamie, moves into his grandmother's house in Eastfield, Indiana. In an effort to make friends and avoid a bully, Louis tells lies about George Ravenhill's house, Nick sneaks into the old man's cellar, scares himself, and Louis, Renee and the kids at school create stories about the encounter that spiral into lies. Derrick and his friends wreck the house and Nick helps to clean it up in order to make amends. His dad helps him learn an important lesson about lying, elders, fear, speaking up, and bullying.
2. "A Star in the Breaking" - Nick, his mom, and his cartoon pal McGee learn a lesson in humility when the fame and popularity of being on a game show goes to Nick's head.
3. "The Not-So-Great Escape" - Nick wants to go with Louis to see "Night Of The Blood Freaks Part 4" in theaters. His parents forbid him to go, saying that the movie's nothing but garbage, and they ground him for arguing and talking back (and telling his sister to shut up). Nick sneaks out, betrays and disobeys his parents, regrets seeing the movie, and gets punished more by doing extra chores this week. In this episode, Nick learns the lesson of honoring your father and mother, and making right choices.
4. "Skate Expectations" - After trying to protect a geeky boy, Phillip, from Derrick and his friends, Nick finds himself in a skateboarding contest, even though he isn't that good at it. He practices, but on the day of the race, Derrick's friends try to sabotage it. However, Nick's friends notice and even though he loses the race, they disqualify Derrick and so he does end up winning. He learns about cheating, practice, friendship, and standing up for others.
5. "Twister and Shout" - One Friday night, Nick and Sarah are staying home alone while their sister Jamie and their grandmother are visiting aunt Marie in Columbus, Ohio and their parents are out of town as well as Renee's divorced mother. With Louis and Renee staying over as well, Sarah is left in charge, which leads to ensuing conflict between her and Nick. However this quickly fades when the kids face the news of an impending tornado, and in the process they deal with fear and faith in God.
6. "Back to the Drawing Board" - Nick and Todd, both talented artists, compete for a coveted spot and reward in a contest. Neither win, but both learn the meaning of good sportsmanship and fair competition.
7. "Do the Bright Thing" - Nick and the others learn another life lesson on making wise decisions, especially when Nick was planning on buying a new drawing table before settling on a sketch pad.
8. "Take Me Out of the Ball Game" - Sarah tells Nick to learn to trust God rather than men as underdog Eastfield Braves battle the Dodgers.
9. "Twas the Fight Before Christmas" - Nick, Louis, and Derrick are cast to play the Three Wise Men in the school's Christmas pageant, but Derrick wants nothing to do with the play. When Nick sees Derrick hanging out with a gang of thieves, he decides to check in on Derrick and discovers why Derrick is such a bully: Derrick has an abusive father and is involved with a gang member named Ray. When Nick shows Derrick a bit of kindness, Derrick begins to have a change of heart and, after performing in the school play, ends up saving Nick's life when Ray attacks Nick in an alley. Derrick fights Ray off and Nick thanks him, with the two ending on good terms with each other.

=== The New Adventures of McGee and Me! (1993) ===
1. "In the Nick of Time" - Nick, Phillip and Renee join their fathers on a mountain climbing trip to California. While Phillip's prankster father puts Phillip and the rest of the group on edge, and Renee's father hopes to catch up on lost time since moving to California some years earlier following his divorce from Renee's mother, in a way much to Renee's dismay. Nick deals with a staggering fear of heights. This fear is pushed to the ultimate limit when Nick must rescue his father after falling off a cliff. In the process, Nick learns about courage and believing in yourself.
2. "The Blunder Years" - Nick is taken under the wing of Rex Rogers, the most popular guy in junior high, who shows Nick how to act "cool", straining Nick's relationship both with his parents and with his real friends, Renee, Phillip, and Jordan. The new and improved Derrick must help Nick learn a lesson in peer pressure by reminding him who his true friends are.
3. "Beauty in the Least" - Nick and his family learn to "love your neighbor as yourself". Much to everyone's dismay, Nick's Romanian pen pal and his father pay a surprise visit to the Martins, just in time for Thanksgiving. Even though the two visitors seem like an inconvenience, they eventually teach the family a lesson in love, hospitality, and the true meaning of Thanksgiving.

=== Special (1995) ===
1. McGee TV: Out of Control - In this compilation of many of the previous episodes' animated McGee segments and a few of the live action sequences, McGee hosts his own brand new TV network, McGee TV, featuring all new animated sequences accompanied by an announcer voice (provided by Townsend Coleman). As McGee tries to operate his network, things get out of hand as the task soon becomes more than he can handle.

== Reception ==
Mary Stevens of the Chicago Tribune described the children's series as "exceptional", and that "the production quality is top-notch". Stevens goes on to say that the series "offers an entertaining mixture of live action, animation and well-written stories with positive moral messages", and despite being based on Bible principles "the series isn't excessively preachy or pushy". Entertainment Weekly gave the episode "A Star in the Breaking" an A rating: "No matter what your religious orientation, you and your child will likely find the message compelling".

== Awards and nominations ==
In 1990, producer George Taweel received the Michael Landon Award for the series. In 1993, Joe Dammann, Sarah Dammann, Chelsea Hertford, Whit Hertford, and Shaylisa Hurte received nominations for "Outstanding Youth Mini-Video Series".
