= Mary Jane Queen =

American singer and banjo player (1914–2007)

Mary Jane Prince Queen
- Born: February 20, 1914; Jackson County, North Carolina, U.S.
- Died: June 29, 2007 (aged 93)
- Occupations: Singer, banjo player
- Spouse: Claude Queen
- Children: 8
- Awards: National Heritage Fellowship (2007); North Carolina Heritage Award (1993)

Mary Jane Prince Queen (February 20, 1914 – June 29, 2007) was an American ballad singer and banjo player. She was once called a "walking archive of mountain music" for her knowledge of the traditional music of Appalachia.

== Biography ==
Queen was born in Jackson County, North Carolina, and lived in the Caney Fork area for much of her life. She was descended from some of the earliest settlers of the valley, and was of Irish extraction. Her father, Jim Prince, was a clawhammer banjo player, and she learned many songs from working with him; Her mother, Clearsie, was an able singer, as were both grandmothers, and she had eight siblings, many of whom were also musicians. With her husband, Claude Queen, she raised eight children; after his death she began singing at local and regional festivals. She passed on many traditions to her children, who have since formed a band. Queen was recognized with a National Heritage Fellowship in 2007, and received the North Carolina Heritage Award in 1993. In 1999 she and her family were the recipients of Western Carolina University's Mountain Heritage Award. Queen worked with Maggie Greenwald on the script of the film Songcatcher, and served as the inspiration for the character of Viney Butler in the film, on whose soundtrack she also appeared. She also shared her knowledge of local traditions and history with many folklife organizations in North Carolina.
