= Aumann =

Aumann is a surname. Notable people with the surname include:

- Franz Joseph Aumann, (1728–1797), Austrian composer
- Georg Aumann (1906–1980), German mathematician
- Raimond Aumann (born 1963), German footballer
- Robert Aumann (born 1930), Israeli mathematician
  - Aumann's agreement theorem
- Susan L. M. Aumann (born 1960), American politician from Maryland

== See also ==
- Auman
