= Arlis =

Arlis or ARLIS may refer to:

- Art Libraries Society
  - Art Libraries Society of North America
- Arctic Research Laboratory Ice Station
- Alaska Resources Library and Information Services at UAA/APU Consortium Library
- USS Impetuous, known the interwar period as Arlis

== See also ==
- Arliss (disambiguation)
- Murder of Arlis Perry, 1974
