= The Problem of the Hero =

2023 film directed by Shaun Dozier

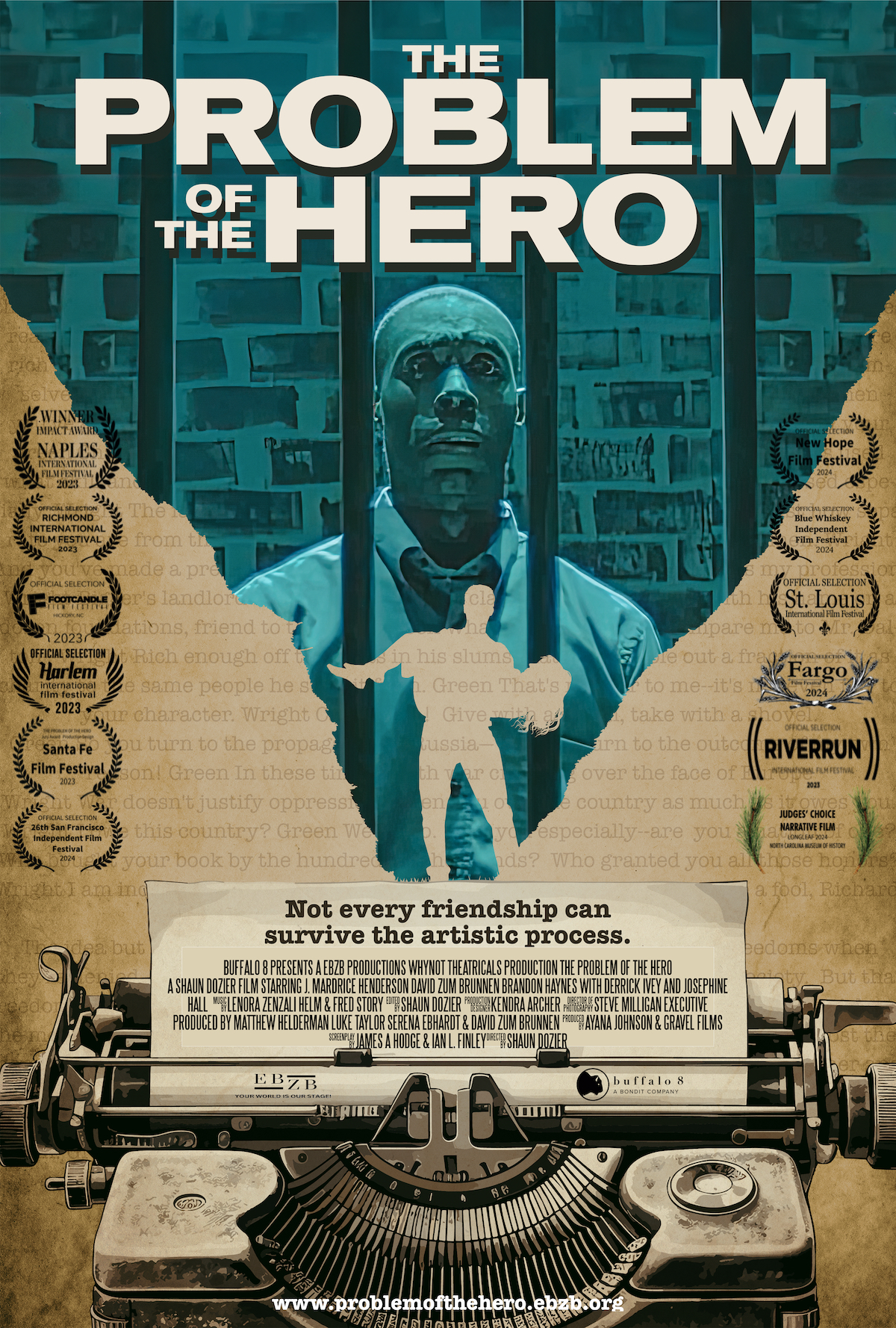
- The Problem of the Hero Official Cinema Poster
- Directed by: Shaun Dozier
- Written by: James A. Hodge; Ian Finley
- Produced by: Ayana Johnson
- Starring: J. Mardrice Henderson, David zum Brunnen
- Cinematography: Steve Milligan
- Edited by: Shaun Dozier
- Music by: Lenora Zenzalai Helm; Fred Story
- Production company: EbzB Productions/WhyNot Theatricals
- Distributed by: Buffalo8
- Release dates: February 17, 2023 (Santa Fe Film Festival); March 28, 2025
- Running time: 85 minutes
- Country: United States
- Language: English
- Budget: $248,000

The Problem of the Hero is a 2023 American drama film directed by Shaun Dozier. The film centers on the true-to-life collaboration of two twentieth-century literary greats, novelist Richard Wright & playwright Paul Green, as they face a spirited confrontation over race, class, politics, social justice and agency.

== Synopsis ==
Set in pre-World War II New York City and North Carolina, a growing friendship that has developed between famed author, Richard Wright, and Pulitzer Prize winning playwright, Paul Green, may be pulled apart. As they partner to adapt Wright's new best-selling book, Native Son, into a Broadway play, and rehearsals continue around them, a disagreement between the two emerges over a single page of the script - just as opening night is approaching in March, 1941. What unfolds is a conflict that deepens into questions about race, class, politics, and personal agency - matters profoundly important to each man.

== Cast ==
- J. Mardrice Henderson as Richard Wright
- David zum Brunnen as Paul Green
- Derrick Ivey as Ray Collins
- Brandon Haynes as Canada Lee
- Josephine Hall as Nell Harrison
- Charlie Cannon as Orson Welles
- Alexa Yeames as Jean Rosenthal
- Annie McElroy as Anne Burr
- Lex Wilson as Walter Ash

== Release ==
The Problem of the Hero had its film festival premiere at the Santa Fe Film Festival in 2023. The Problem of the Hero was officially released by Buffalo8 in March 2025.

== Critical reception ==
The Problem of the Hero received positive critical reception. It holds a 100% "Fresh" rating on Rotten Tomatoes based on eight reviews. Reviewing for Film Threat, Benjamin Franz, called the film "a passionate, blazing, and deeply enticing human drama." In a review for Film Obsessive, J Paul Johnson praised the film for examining "a pivotal moment in American literature and theater with a well-researched script and well rehearsed cast".
