= Arliss (given name) =

Arliss is a unisex given name and nickname which may refer to:

== People ==
- Arliss Howard (born 1954), American actor, writer and film director
- Arliss Ryan (born 1950), American novelist, short story writer and essayist
- Arliss Sturgulewski (1927–2022), American retired businesswoman and politician
- Arliss Watford (1924–1998), American woodcarver

== Fictional characters ==
- Arliss Michaels, protagonist of the American television series Arliss
