= Emma Dupree =

American herbalist and traditional healer

Emma Dupree (July 4, 1897 - March 12, 1996) was an herbalist and traditional healer (sometimes called a "granny woman") in Falkland and Fountain, Pitt County, North Carolina.

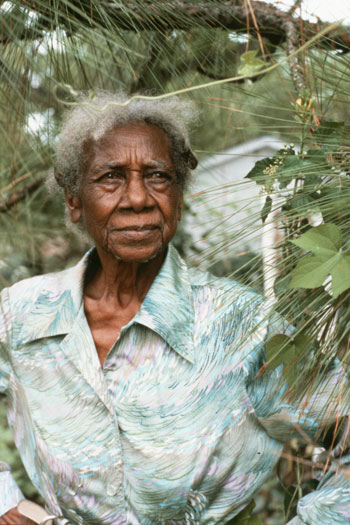

== Background ==
Emma Dupree's parents, Pennia and Noah Williams, were formerly enslaved people. They had eighteen children, with the seventh child being Emma Dupree. Born July 4, 1897, Emma Williams Dupree grew up on the Tar River and was known as the "woods gal" for her penchant for roaming the woods for herbs, and she was known collectively in her community as "that little medicine thing." Emma told an interviewer in 1979 that her mother remembered being "on the porch of the old Wooten's farm home when freedom came. She was 16 when Mr. and Mrs. Wooten walked out on that porch and told her she was 'as free as they were, but they loved her just the same.'"

Emma was married for one year to Ethan Cherry, a farmer. She divorced him and remarried another farmer, Austin Dupree, Jr., who was born in 1892. Emma and Austin moved to Fountain, NC in 1936 and had five children, whose ages in the 1930 U.S. Census are indicated in parentheses: Lucy (12), Herbert (9), John (5), Doris (3), and Mary (1). They remained married until his death at age 98. She died at home, at 3313 N. Jefferson St, Fountain, on March 12, 1996.

She is buried at Saint John's Missionary Baptist Church Cemetery, in Falkland.

Emma Dupree's "garden-grown pharamacy" included sassafras, white mint, double tansy, rabbit tobacco, maypop, mullein, catnip, horseradish, silkweed, and other plants from which she made tonics, teas, salves, and dried preparations. These were cultivated in her yard and gathered from the banks of the Tar River. She told Karen Baldwin that she grew a special tree in her back yard, which she called her "healing berry tree." She explained, "Now that tree, I don't know of another name for it, but it's in the old-fashioned Bible and the seed for it came from Rome." She also told Baldwin of being an especially alert baby: "They said I was just looking every which way. And I kept acting and moving and doing things a baby didn't do. And I walked early. I was walking at seven months old, just as good and strong. When I got so I got out doors, I went to work. I was pulling up weeds, biting them, smelling in them, and spitting them out. And folks in them days, they just watched me, watched what I was doing."

== Awards and recognition ==
- (1984) Dupree was awarded the Brown-Hudson Award by the North Carolina Folklore Society, recognizing her as an individual who contributed significantly to the transmission, appreciation and observance of traditional culture and folklife in North Carolina.
- (1992) Dupree received the North Carolina Heritage Award, lifetime achievement recognition for outstanding traditional artists in North Carolina.
