= Dorothy Auman =

- Died: 1991
- Known for: Pottery
- Movement: The Seagrove Pottery
- Spouse: Walter Auman
- Awards: North Carolina Heritage Award

Dorothy Auman was a potter, whose works won a North Carolina Heritage Award, in 1989, from the North Carolina Arts Council.

== Life ==
Dorothy Cole Auman belonged to the eighth generation of a potter family: her father owned a pottery business but wasn't a potter himself, though her grandparents and cousin were avid potters. Her ancestors came to the Seagrove area in the 1760s because of the plentiful potting clay and kiln fuel. As an adult, she married another person from a potter family, Walter Auman, and they created a business, "The Seagrove Pottery," in which they sold their work. Auman was also interested in the origins and traditions of pottery and spent time collecting and documenting it, until selling it to pay for life expenses.

William Hunt, editor of Ceramics Monthly, noted that the Aumans "were people who made a contribution to American ceramics that is untouchable."

The Mint Museum of Art bought her collection for public exhibit.

Dorothy and Walter Auman died in 1991 in a freak highway accident, when an unsecured load of lumber fell from a passing tractor-trailer and crushed their vehicle.
