= Elliot Engel =

American academic

Elliot Engel FRSA
- Born: Indianapolis, Indiana, U.S.
- Education: University of California, Los Angeles (M.A., Ph.D)
- Occupations: writer; academic
- Partner(s): James LeRoy King, Jr. (died 2023)
- Writing career
- Genres: Non-fiction

Elliot Engel is an American academic.

== Early life and education ==
Engel was born and raised in Indianapolis, Indiana. He studied at the University of California, Los Angeles, where he earned a Master of Arts and a doctoral degree, and was a Woodrow Wilson Fellow.

== Career ==
Engel served on the faculty, as a professor and lecturer, at University of California, Los Angeles, at North Carolina State University, at the University of North Carolina at Chapel Hill, and at Duke University.

He authored several books published in England, Japan, Turkey, and the United States, including A Dab of Dickens & A Touch of Twain (Simon & Schuster) - an edited collection of several of his well-known lectures, and Pickwick Papers: An Annotated Bibliography. Engel's mini-lecture series on Charles Dickens ran on PBS Television stations around the country.

Four of Engel's plays were produced. Engel's play, The Night Before Christmas Carol, enjoyed success as an annual national public television broadcast in both the United States and Canada, an EbzB Productions' performance with actor David zum Brunnen, and had touring success nationally with the same actor. The premiere collaboration of The Night Before Christmas Carol featured actor Jeffrey West, who originated the role on stages in North Carolina.

Engel's articles appeared in multiple newspapers and national magazines including Newsweek. He lectured throughout the United States and on all seven continents, delivering an Antarctica lecture on a cruise ship.

Widely recognized for his concentration in Dickensian Scholarship, Engel received North Carolina's Adult Education Award, North Carolina State's Alumni Professorship, and The Victorian Society’s Award of Merit. In 2009, he was inducted into the Royal Society of Arts in England for his academic work and service in promoting Charles Dickens.

In 2014, Engel was named Tar Heel of the Week by the News and Observer for his thirty years of delivering public programs in the humanities and sponsoring state and national literary contests for high school students.

Since 1980, Engel has been President of the Dickens Fellowship of North Carolina, the largest branch of this worldwide network of clubs. The sales of his books, CDs, and DVDs have raised funds for Great Ormond Street Hospital, formerly the Hospital for Sick Children, which Dickens helped found in London in 1852.

== Personal life ==
Engel lives in Raleigh, North Carolina. He was the long-term partner of James LeRoy King Jr., a doctor and the co-founder of Wake Anesthesiology Associates. King died in 2023.
