= The Badgett Sisters =

American folk and gospel group

The Badgett Sisters were an American folk and gospel group from Yanceyville in Caswell County, North Carolina. They began in 1933 as The Badgett Family and included their father, Cortelyou Odell Badgett (1905-1978), and sisters Ella, Cleo and Celester. Ella left when she turned 16 and Connie, the youngest, joined. After their father's death, they became The Badgett Sisters. They were the recipients of a 1990 North Carolina Heritage Award.

As of 2019, Connie B. Steadman performs as an acappella musician and storyteller solo artist throughout North Carolina.

== History ==
Under their father's tutelage, the Badgett Sisters learned to sing spirituals, hymns, and gospel songs in the jubilee style, a form of unaccompanied close harmony learned from their father, Cortelyou Odell Badgett (1905-1978). They sing in the jubilee style, a form popular in the 1930s and 1940s. The Badgett Sisters began performing at the ages of 4-6. All of the Badgetts' arrangements are original.

Having performed around the world, the Badgett Sisters traveled as far as Australia and performed at Carnegie Hall.

=== Awards ===
- 1990: North Carolina Folk Heritage Award, awarded to the state of North Carolina's most eminent folk artists.
- Old Highway #62 that runs south from Yanceyville, North Carolina, was renamed Badgett Sisters Parkway.

=== Albums ===
- 1990: Just A Little While to Stay Here
- 1986: The Voice That Refused
