= William Mayer =

William or Bill Mayer may refer to:

- Bill Mayer (born 1951), American illustrator
- William Mayer (composer) (1925–2017), American composer
- William A. Mayer (f. 1956–1959), American polo player
- William Daniel Mayer (1941–2026), former member of the Maryland House of Delegates
- William E. Mayer, investment banker and former owner of the Hartford Colonials
- William V. Mayer (1920–1989), American biologist and educator

== See also ==
- William Meyer (disambiguation)
- William Moyer (1933–2002), author and organizer in the 1966 Chicago Freedom Movement
