= Obadiah Carter =

American singer (1925–1994)

Obadiah Hawthorne Carter (December 12, 1925 – June 30, 1994) was an American musician who was a member of the "5" Royales, an R & B group in the 1940s and 1950s.

Carter was born in Spartanburg, South Carolina, the youngest son of John Carter, a gardener, and Octavia, a laundress. His father died when Obadiah was young, and he and his mother had to move in with his older sister, Lottie, and her husband.

In 1951, the group originated as a gospel quintet known as the Royal Sons, which originated in Winston-Salem, North Carolina. The members were locals: Carter, Johnny Tanner, Eugene Tanner, Lowman Pauling, and Jimmy Moore. The band sang in churches and on street corners, but eventually recorded in the Apollo Records Label in New York City. The Royal Sons transformed into an R & B group after their secular songs, "You Know I Know" and "Courage to Love," became popular. The name changed as well as the music, and the hometown quintet became commonly known as the "5" Royales.

Obadiah Carter was the North Carolina Heritage Award Recipient in 1992.

The "5" Royales were inducted into the Rock and Roll Hall of Fame in 2015.
