= Glenn and Lula Bolick =

American potters and musicians

Glenn Bolick and Lula Bolick (née Owens) are contemporary potters and musicians living in North Carolina. They are both recipients of the 2018 North Carolina Heritage Award for their work in traditional arts including pottery, music, and storytelling. Lula Bolick is a fifth generation potter, her great-grandfather having started what is now ("Original") Owens Pottery near Seagrove, North Carolina. The Bolicks started Bolick Family Pottery (now known as Traditions Pottery), which is located in Blowing Rock, North Carolina.

== Art career ==
The Bolicks originally began working for Lula's father, M.L. Owens. In 1973, they opened Bolick Family Pottery in Caldwell County, where Glenn was raised. The Bolicks are also interested in traditional music and storytelling. In addition to pottery, Glenn also works as a saw-miller.

Bolick Family Pottery has also been referred to as Bolick and Traditions Pottery. It is now known as Traditions Pottery, and still located in Blowing Rock. It is owned by the couple's daughter, Janet Bolick Calhoun, and her husband Mike Calhoun. The store continues to stock Bolick, Traditions, and Original Owens Pottery, in addition to other items.

In 2018, the Bolicks received the North Carolina Heritage Award North Carolina Heritage Award for their work in traditional arts.
