= James Allen Rose =

American model boat builder

James Allen Rose (January 5, 1935 – April 5, 2013) was an American model boat builder and wood craftsman from Harkers Island, North Carolina, and a recipient of the 2000 North Carolina Heritage Award in the Folk/Traditional Crafts and Visual Arts category. Additionally, Rose was awarded the Brown-Hudson Folklore Award in 1996. Rose also played guitar and fiddle, and was a noted local storyteller.

== Biography ==
Though he was born at Southampton Hospital in New York, Rose grew up in the coastal community of Harkers Island, North Carolina. His family had resided in the Core Banks region of North Carolina for generations.

Rose began carving small model boats around the age of 10, selling and trading them with his friends. His first guitar was purchased from the Lancaster Seed Company catalog, and he often played at fishing camps around Cape Lookout. When Rose was unable to join the Coast Guard as a young man, he turned to commercial fishing, boat building, and building houses. Rose estimates he made between 75 and 80 full-sized boats in his career. In his 50s, Rose developed arthritis and left the commercial fishing industry. He devoted himself full-time to model boat building.
