= North Carolina Heritage Award =

The North Carolina Heritage Award is an award given out by the North Carolina Arts Council, an agency of the North Carolina Department of Natural and Cultural Resources, in recognition of traditional artists from the U.S. state of North Carolina. The award was created in 1989.

Since 1989, the North Carolina Heritage Award has honored North Carolina's most eminent folk artists. Recipients of the Heritage Awards range from internationally acclaimed musicians to folks who quietly practice their art in rural and family settings. A dozen North Carolinians have gone on to receive the National Heritage Fellowship Awards presented by the National Endowment for the Arts. These awards deepen our awareness of the rich and diverse cultural traditions of people in North Carolina. The Heritage Award has become one of the most important and influential programs developed by the Folklife Program of the North Carolina Arts Council.

Recipients receive a cash award and are honored in a ceremony that highlights their achievements. The Award ceremonies are a notable celebration and educational event for North Carolinians, drawing large and enthusiastic audiences.

From the Award’s beginning, the Folklife Program of the North Carolina Arts Council engaged talented photographers — Rob Amberg, Cedric N. Chatterley, Mary Anne McDonald, Roger Haile and Bill Bamberger — to document the artistry of award recipients. Their images and the program book articles celebrate and commemorate the skills, values, aesthetics, and meaning of traditional arts in North Carolina.

The Folk Heritage Award recipients from 1989–1996 are also featured in a special issue of the North Carolina Folklore Journal.

== Recipients ==
=== 1989 ===
- Dorothy Auman and Walter Auman, potters (Randolph County, NC)
- Etta Baker (1913–2006), Piedmont blues guitarist and singer (Burke County, NC)
- Thomas Burt (1900-1990), Piedmont blues guitarist, banjoist, and singer (Durham County, NC)
- Thomas Hunter (1919-1993), fiddler (Madison County, NC)
- Emma Taylor (1920-2002), basketmaker (Qualla Boundary)
- Doug Wallin (1919-2000), ballad singer (Madison County, NC)
- Eva Wolfe (1922-2004), Cherokee basketmaker (Qualla Boundary)

=== 1990 ===
- The Badgett Sisters, gospel singers (Caswell County, NC)
- Walker Calhoun (1918-2012), Cherokee musician and dancer (Qualla Boundary)
- Earnest East (1916-2000), fiddler (Surry County, NC)
- Benton Flippen (b. 1920), fiddler (Surry County, NC)
- Wilma McNabb (d. 1991), weaver (Cherokee County, NC)
- Dellie Norton (1898-1993), ballad singer (Madison County, NC)
- Sallie Parnell (1887-1994), rag-rug weaver (Davidson County, NC)

=== 1991 ===
- Effie Rhodes Bell, quilter (Pender County, NC)
- Lela Brooks, Tobacco twine crocheter (Robeson County, NC)
- Burlon Craig (1914-2002), potter in the style of Catawba Valley Pottery (Lincoln County, NC)
- Menhaden Chanteymen, performers of worksongs (Carteret County, NC)
- Hazel Rhodes Reece (1925-2015), quilter (Onslow County, NC)
- Quay Smathers (1913-1997), shape note singer and teacher (Haywood County, NC)
- Thurman Strickland, basketmaker (Johnston County, NC)
- Joe Thompson (musician) (1918-2012), fiddler (Alamance County, NC)
- Odell Thompson, fiddler (Alamance County, NC)

=== 1992 ===
- Obadiah Carter (1925-1994), R & B musician
- Bertie Dickens (1902-1994), old-time banjo player (Alleghany County, NC)
- Emma Dupree (1897-1996), herbalist and healer (Pitt County, NC)
- The "5" Royales, R & B musicians (Forsyth County, NC)
- Leonard Glenn (1910-1997), banjo and dulcimer maker (Watauga County, NC)
- Ray Hicks (1922-2003), storyteller (Watauga County, NC)
- Algia Mae Hinton (1929-2018), blues guitarist and buck dancer (Johnston County, NC)
- Lauchlin Shaw (1912-2000), fiddler (Harnett County, NC)
- A. C. Overton (1926-2007), old-time banjo player (Wake County, NC)

=== 1993 ===
- Louise Anderson (1921-1994), storyteller (Onslow County, NC)
- Julian Guthrie (1914-1998), boatbuilder (Carteret County, NC)
- Bea Hensley (1919-2013), blacksmith (Mitchell County, NC)
- George Higgs (1930-2013), blues musician (Edgecombe County, NC)
- Mary Jane Queen (1914-2007), ballad singer (Jackson County, NC)
- George SerVance, Jr., woodcarver (Davidson County, NC)
- Luke Smathers (1914-1997), stringband musician (Haywood County, NC)
- Harold Smathers (1911-1995), stringband musician (Haywood County, NC)

=== 1994 ===
- Carroll Best (1931-1995), banjo player (Haywood County, NC)
- Aaron Buff (1911-1994), chair maker (Burke County, NC)
- Robert Dotson (1923-2015), flatfoot dancer (Watauga County, NC)
- Myrtle Dotson (1921-2008), flatfoot dancer (Watauga County, NC)
- John Dee Holeman (1929-2021), blues guitarist and buck dancer (Durham County, NC)
- Quentin "Fris" Holloway (1918-2008), bluesman and buck dancer (Durham County, NC)
- Vernon Owens (b.1941), potter (Moore County, NC)
- Amanda Swimmer (1921-2018), potter (Qualla Boundary)
- Elsie Trivette, rug maker (Watauga County, NC)
- Doc Watson (1923-2012), guitarist and traditional singer, and the Watson Family (Watauga County, NC)

=== 1995 ===
- The Branchettes: Lenna Mae Perry (b. 1940) and Ethel Elliot (d. 2004), gospel singers (Wake County, NC and Harnett County, NC)
- Raymond Coins (1904-1998), stone and wood carver (Stokes County, NC)
- Homer Fulcher (1918-1995) and Julian Hamilton, Jr. (1925-2000), decoy carvers (Carteret County, NC)
- Big Boy Henry (1921-2004), blues guitarist and singer (Carteret County, NC)
- Virgil Ledford (b. 1940), woodcarver (Qualla Boundary)
- Jim Shumate (1921-2013), bluegrass fiddler (Catawba County, NC)
- Ora Watson (1911-2008), fiddler (Watauga County, NC)

=== 1996 ===
- Robert H. Bushyhead (1914-2016), storyteller and language preservationist (Qualla Boundary)
- Verlen Clifton (1928-2020) and Paul Sutphin (1918-2003), stringband players and singers (Surry County, NC)
- Nell Cole Graves (1908-1997), potter (Randolph County, NC)
- Elizabeth "Lee" Graham Jacobs (1909-2000), quilter (Columbus County, NC)
- Dock Rmah, Jarai traditional musician (Guilford County, NC)
- Earl Scruggs (1924-2012), banjo player (Cleveland County, NC)

=== 1998 ===
- Bessie Killens Eldreth (1913-2016), traditional singer (Watauga County, NC)
- Louise Bigmeat Maney (1932-2001), potter (Qualla Boundary)
- Smith McInnis (1914-2011), Fiddler (Hoke County, NC)
- Ossie Clark Phillips (1915-1998), weaver (Avery County, NC)
- Arthur "Guitar Boogie" Smith (1921-2014), traditional musician and composer (Mecklenburg County, NC)
- Arliss Watford (1924-1998), woodcarver (Hertford County, NC)
- The Wilson Brothers, gospel singers (Swain County, NC)

=== 2000 ===
- Rev. Faircloth Barnes (1929-2011), gospel singer and preacher (Nash County, NC)
- Amanda Crowe (1928–2004), Cherokee wood carver (Qualla Boundary)
- Marvin Gaster (1934-2022), old-time banjo player (Lee County, NC)
- Bobby McMillon (1951-2021), traditional singer and storyteller (Caldwell County, NC)
- Melvin Lee Owens (c. 1929-2015), potter (Randolph County, NC)
- James Allen Rose (1935-2013), model boat builder (Carteret County, NC)

=== 2003 ===
- The Briarhoppers, bluegrass musicians (Mecklenburg County, NC)
- Celia Cole Perkinson (1924-2015) and Neolia Cole Womack (1927-2016), potters (Lee County, NC)
- Emmet Parker Jones (1914-2008), wheelwright (Chowan County, NC)
- Bishop Dready Manning (b. 1934), gospel musician (Halifax, NC)
- Oscar "Red" Wilson (1920-2005), stringband musician (Mitchell County, NC)
- Jerry Wolfe (1924-2018), stickball carver (Qualla Boundary)

=== 2007 ===
- Walter and Ray Davenport, fishermen and net makers (Tyrrell County, NC)
- Mike Harman, weaver (Watauga County, NC)
- Orville Hicks, storyteller (Watauga County, NC)
- Senora Lynch (b. 1963), potter (Warren County, NC)
- George Shuffler (1925-2014), bluegrass and southern gospel musician (Burke County, NC)

=== 2014 ===
- Bobby Hicks (b. 1933), fiddle player (Madison County, NC)
- Susan Morgan Leveille (b. 1949), weaver (Jackson County, NC)
- Sid Luck (b. c. 1945), potter (Moore County, NC)
- Bill Myers, jazz saxophonist and educator (Wilson County, NC)
- Arnold Richardson (b. c. 1938), Haliwa-Saponi artist (Halifax County, NC)

=== 2016 ===
- Sheila Kay Adams (b. 1953), ballad singer, storyteller (Madison County, NC)
- H. Ju Nie (1944-2021) and H. Ngach Rahlan, Montagnard-Dega weavers (Guilford County, NC)
- James Lewis, Jamie Lewis, and Houston Lewis, boat builders (Carteret County, NC)
- Maceo Parker (b. 1943), funk musician (Lenoir County, NC)
- Marc Pruett (b. 1951), banjo (Haywood County, NC)

=== 2018 ===
- Asha Bala, Performer and instructor of South Indian dance (Wake County, NC)
- Glenn & Lula Bolick, Potters, musicians, and storytellers (Watauga County, NC)
- Arvil Freeman (1932-2021), Western North Carolina fiddler (Madison County, NC)
- Robert "Dick" Knight (b. 1950), Soul, R&B, and jazz trumpet player (Lenoir County, NC)
- Tony Williamson, Multi-genre mandolinist rooted in bluegrass (Chatham County, NC)

=== 2023 ===
- Richard Bowman, old-time fiddler (Surry County, NC)
- Cornelio Campos (b. 1971), painter and muralist (Durham County, NC)
- Butch Goings, woodcarver (Qualla Boundary)
- Louise Goings (b. 1947), Cherokee basket maker (Qualla Boundary)
- Rhonda Gouge (b. 1955), gospel and bluegrass musician and educator (Mitchell County, NC)
- Neal Thomas, white oak basket maker (Wake County, NC)

== See also ==
- National Heritage Fellowship
