= Cornelio Campos =

Mexican American muralist

Cornelio Campos Vincente
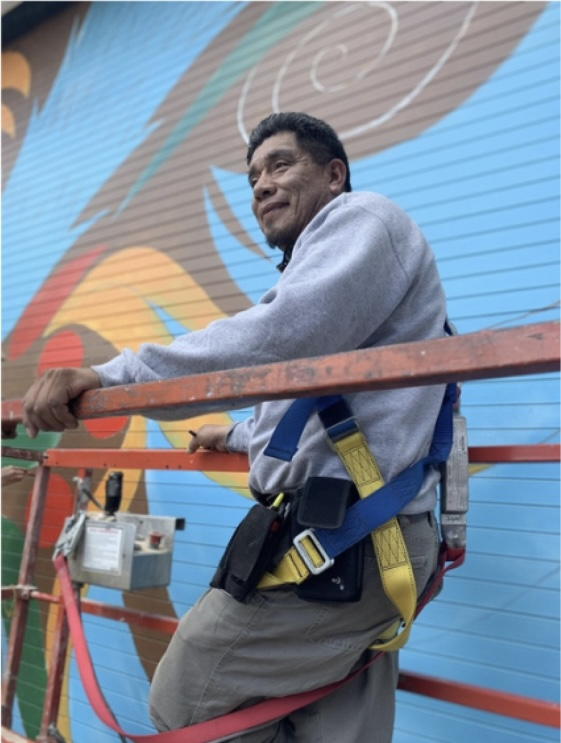
- Cornelio Campos painting a mural in Durham, 2019
- Occupation(s): Muralist and painter
- Website: corneliocampos.com

Cornelio Campos Vincente, born in 1971 (age 53–54), is a Mexican American muralist who lives in Durham, North Carolina. Of Purépecha origin, Campos immigrated from Cherán, Michoacán to the United States and came to live in North Carolina in the 1990s. Campos is a recipient of the 2023 North Carolina Heritage Award.

== Art career ==
As a child, Campos worked as an apprentice with a local artist into his teenage years. Following family and better opportunity to the United States, he developed as an artist while living in Los Angeles, and then settled permanently in North Carolina. After moving to North Carolina, Campos labored as a farmer and was unable to dedicate his time and finances to painting. The opportunity to begin a career as an electrician allowed him to have the financial stability to paint again.

Campos' art contains references to various indigenous cultures. His artwork depicts the struggles of immigrant/migrants. Campos' work brings awareness to the experiences of these people and uses his artwork as a social agent to advocate for the Mexican American community.

Campos has worked with the Durham County Library to create an archive collection of his artwork.
