= ARTS North Carolina =

Not for profit arts organisation

ARTS North Carolina logo

Arts North Carolina is a not-for-profit arts organization based in Raleigh, North Carolina, whose goal is to strengthen public awareness of and provide support for the arts industry of North Carolina. Arts North Carolina solicits memberships, primarily from local arts councils and other arts organizations who have been direct recipients of grant monies, but also individuals, artists, and businesses who have an interest in seeing the arts industry grow and flourish in North Carolina.

In addition to providing support for arts organizations in the forms of technical assistance, professional development, and networking opportunities, Arts North Carolina provides support for a full-time arts lobbyist and a yearly grassroots lobbying event, Arts Day. These lobbying efforts are designed to increase funding for the local arts councils, which in turn increase the amount of grant money available to local artists and arts organizations.

Their current campaign is entitled Plant the Arts: Grow North Carolina, which has identifiable connections with a similar campaign by the North Carolina Department of Agriculture and Consumer Services, entitled Goodness Grows in North Carolina. The campaign makes the claim that investment in the arts industry will lead, through various direct and indirect channels, to a better economy for North Carolina.

The current Executive Director and Registered Lobbyist is Karen Wells, and the current Board President is Pierce Egerton.

== See also ==
- North Carolina Arts Council
