= Arliss Watford =

American woodcarver

Arliss A. Watford (1924–1998) was an American woodcarver from Ahoskie in Hertford County, North Carolina. He specialized in the carving of humanoid figures, such as angels and local fixtures in his community, including his family and friends. In 1998, Watford was awarded the North Carolina Folk Heritage Award, one of seven recipients in that year.

== Personal life ==
Watford was born in the town of Ahoskie in 1924, and remained in the area of Hertford County most of his life, with his shop located just six miles from his birthplace. He grew up with fourteen siblings, and first began to experiment with woodcarving as a child throughout the 1920s. He only began to profit off his works, however, when he opened his shop in the early 1980s. Prior to his professional woodcarving career, Watford worked in a variety of industries, including bricklaying, carpentry, shipyard work, farming, factory work, as well as a stint in the military.

Arliss was married to Louise Simmons Watford. Their children were Arliss Jr., Almarie, Shirley, Reginald, Michael, Velma, and Gregory. Today, many of his family, including his grandchildren, live in the area of Hertford County. Watford died in 1998.

== Works ==
Most of Watford's early works, created during his childhood, came about as a result of his family's poverty; instead of buying toys and other items that he wanted, Watford was instead encouraged to make his own. He later carved smaller pieces in his adulthood, as he worked in various industries. Watford began honing his specific style of woodcarving after opening his shop. Using primarily red cedar and cypress, he carved a number of works, including human and animal figures, totem poles, and religious scenes.

Themes of African American life in eastern North Carolina are found in much of Watford's work. Many of his carvings feature African American laborers, sharecroppers, and families, specifically mothers. Other works of his reflect his faith and other personal aspects of his childhood and community; a number of these works were given to friends and family in the Ahoskie community following their creation.
