= Bobby McMillon =

Robert Lynn 'Bobby' McMillon (December 20, 1951 – November 28, 2021) was an American traditional ballad singer, musician, and storyteller living in Lenoir, North Carolina. He was a 2000 recipient of the North Carolina Heritage Award.

== Career ==
Bobby performed throughout North Carolina as well as at the Smithsonian Folklife Festival, the A.P. Carter Memorial Festival, the Festival for the Eno, and national storytelling conferences. McMillon has also worked with public schools through the Artist in the Schools and Visiting Artist programs.
