= Tony Williamson (musician) =

American jazz musician

Tony Williamson is an American mandolin player from Chatham County, North Carolina, whose compositions integrate everything from traditional Piedmont string band tunes to classical music and jazz.

== Early life ==
Tony Williamson was born in the rural Piedmont region of North Carolina to a family of woodworkers and musicians. His grandfather and father played banjo in their spare time, while Tony's older siblings played guitar, fiddle, and banjo. His grandfather, Alfred, made his own musical instruments and mentored his grandchildren, Tony and Gary, who began playing music around 1957. Tony and Gary started performing together at a young age, with Tony on mandolin and Gary on banjo. In 1968, the Williamson Brothers recorded "John Henry" for Follett Publishing Co. for an anthology called Discovering Music Together. Also included in this book and LP record album collection were contributions from Blood Sweat & Tears and the Boston Symphony. By 1969, the brothers had won First place Mandolin and First place Band at the Old Time Fiddlers and Bluegrass Festival World Championship in Union Grove, North Carolina.

== Education ==
Williamson graduated from the University of North Carolina-Chapel Hill in 1975.

== Music career ==
Williamson began touring with the band Bluegrass Alliance upon graduating college. He continued on to play with a variety of classical, jazz, folk, and bluegrass bands throughout his career. He has performed all over the world, including locations such as France, Ireland, Japan, Taiwan, Brazil, and Peru. Williamson has performed with many musicians, including Alison Krauss, Chris Thile, Earl Scruggs, Bill Monroe, Bobby Hicks, Tony Rice, Vassar Clements, David Grisman, Sam Bush, Ricky Skaggs, Jerry Douglas, and Robin and Linda Williams. Williamson also owns and operates Mandolin Central, an international resource for vintage instruments.

== Awards and recognition ==
Williamson won the International Bluegrass Music Award for Recorded Event of the Year in 1994. Williamson won the North Carolina Heritage Award in 2018.

== Personal life ==
In addition to being a professional musician, Williamson operated a home-based flint and obsidian knife-making business. Years of fine work with these and the mandolin caused Williamson to develop severe fasciitis in both his arms, and several specialists told Williamson he would never be able to play again. Williamson was rehabilitated by switching briefly to an electric mandolin and undergoing treatment by a traditional Chinese medicine healer.
