= Chair-maker =

Craftsperson in the furniture trades specializing in chairs

Since the mid-17th century, a chair-maker is a craftsperson in the furniture trades specializing in chairs. Before that time seats were made by joiners, turners, and coffer makers, and woven seats were made by basketmakers. In 18th-century London, chair-makers might work on their own account, or within the workshop of upholders, as members of the upholstery trade were called.

In 1803 Thomas Sheraton observed a division of labour that was of long standing in London and county towns:

"Chair-making is a branch generally confined to itself, as those who professedly work at it, seldom engage to make cabinet furniture. In the country manufactories it is otherwise; yet even these pay some regard to keeping their workmen constantly at the chair, or to cabinet work. The two branches seem evidently to require different talents in workmen, in order to become proficients."

In Paris, a chair-maker was a menuisier, or joiner: guild regulations forbade menuisiers to engage in cabinet making. Some menuisiers produced the planed and carved wood paneling for rooms (boiseries), while others, menuisiers en sièges, produced the frames for seat furniture, which would be upholstered by other craftsmen, such as huissiers.
