= William T. Myers =

American philosopher

Education
- Education: University of Texas at Austin (PhD)

Philosophical work
- Era: 21st-century philosophy
- Region: Western philosophy
- Institutions: Birmingham–Southern College
- Main interests: process philosophy, American philosophy, ethics, philosophy of religion

William T. Myers is an American philosopher and Professor of Philosophy at Birmingham–Southern College. He is known for his works on process philosophy and American philosophy.

== Books ==
- Philosophers of Process, 2nd edition, edited with Douglas Browning, Fordham University Press, 1998.
- Thinking with Whitehead and the American Pragmatists: Experience and Reality, co-edited with Brian Henning and Joseph John, Lexington Press, April 2015.
