= Bill Myers (musician) =

William E. Myers is a musician, bandleader, and educator from North Carolina. He and Cleveland Flowe co-founded the Monitors in 1957. The band, whose first vocalist was Roberta Flack, also included during its 66-year run three musicians who played with and recorded for James Brown. The Monitors played a mix of R&B, funk, and jazz, performing multiple shows each year in and around their home of Wilson, North Carolina until 2023.

== Early life, education & professional career ==
Myers grew up in Greenville, North Carolina, near "the Block," which was a thriving entertainment district for Blacks on Albemarle Avenue during the 1930s through the early 1960s. Among his first jobs was running the cash register at Ma Bell's, a popular café. He also picked up work playing saxophone with Winstead's Mighty Minstrels, a traveling Black vaudeville show popular in the South into the 1950s, whenever they were in the area.

Myers graduated from Virginia State University in Petersburg, Virginia, served in the U.S. Army in Korea, and moved to Wilson, North Carolina to take a job as a music teacher in nearby Elm City, North Carolina, at the all-Black Frederick Douglass High School. He continued to work as a band director through the early years of integration, before being promoted into administration not long before retirement.

== The Monitors ==
The Monitors were renowned regionally for their talented instrumentalists and vocalists, for their high energy performances, and for their professionalism. John Harris's 2014 book "Make the Gig": the Story of the Monitors was written in collaboration with Myers, who is also responsible for establishing the Oliver Nestus Round House Museum of African-American History in Wilson. The Monitors formed out of the serendipitous hiring and meeting of two young men to lead bands at two African-American schools. Cleveland Flowe, Jr. and Bill Myers moved to Wilson in 1957 for these jobs and also took rooms in the same boarding house, at 619 Green Street. Flowe directed band at Charles H. Darden High School in Wilson, and Bill Myers did the same at Frederick Douglass School in nearby Elm City. Both were playing in dance bands, Flowe on piano with a group out of Rocky Mount, NC, and Myers on sax with the Cavaliers, from Greenville, NC. The new band they formed took its name from a popular NBC radio program called "Monitor." Myers explained: "We wanted to create a band that could play all types of music, just like the Monitor (radio program) that offered all kinds of programming." Their biggest influence at the time was Louis Jordan and his Tympany Five, whose instrumentation they copied: a sax out front of a 4-piece rhythm section. The Monitors were an instrumentals band at the beginning, popular enough at White country clubs and dances that they didn't feel the need for a vocalist.

In "Make the Gig", Myers recalls an impressive all-time band roster and how Roberta Flack became the band's first vocalist. Flack had roomed with Cleveland Flowe's sister, Betty, at Howard University and recently taken a job teaching English and music at H. B. Sugg High School in nearby Farmville, North Carolina, in a segregated school system. Betty Flowe suggested the Monitors should hire Flack, which they did, although after a year, she moved back to Washington, Myers told Harris: "She was citified and ready for things to be progressive." During her Monitors year, Myers and the band would pick her up for gigs at her house in Farmville and get her home late at night, which "created quite a stir" around town, Myers said, although Flack "didn't seem to mind." Myers remembers her as a "wonderful vocalist" and classical pianist who'd occasionally sit at the piano during the band's breaks to continue entertaining. She was also an astute musical critic, Myers recalled. After he had once played a "long, fast-paced sax solo filled with lots of notes and fancy phrasing," she told him afterwards: "Bill, you played a lot of notes, but you didn't say anything." Flack returned to Wilson in 1990 to headline a Wilson County Arts Council concert attended by over 2,000.

In 2011, Myers and the Monitors played the Smithsonian Folklife Festival.

== The James Brown Connection ==
Three Monitors had extensive experience playing with James Brown: Sam Lathan, Nat Jones, and Richard Knight.

Wilson native Sam Lathan is one of the drummers on the Live at the Apollo (1963 album) recording. Like Myers, as a teenager he played with Winstead's Mighty Minstrels whenever they were in town. He told John Harris that he received a telegram from Brown, who set up an audition for Lathan at the Reid Street Community Center in Wilson, where a crowd gathered to watch. Lathan said it was "tense," and that Brown "pulled up a chair, sat right beside me, watching every move I made. Once he'd heard enough, he asked, 'Can you be in New York City by Friday morning?' I said, 'YES SIR!'" Lathan also played on the Pure Dynamite! Live at the Royal recording, with longtime Brown drummer Melvin Parker. But three years was enough for Lathan; he returned to Wilson to raise a family and joined the Monitors.

Nat Jones, who arranged and played saxophone for Brown, was from Kinston, North Carolina, where its lively music scene included three other future long-time Brown bandsmen: drummer Melvin Parker and his brother, saxophonist Maceo Parker, and Brown's only valve trombonist, Leon Rasbury. Rasbury had been one of Jones' students at Adkin High School in Kinston.

Trumpeter Richard Knight met Nat Jones in 1964, when he moved to Kinston to teach band at Savannah High School in rural Lenoir County, North Carolina. Jones, a recent North Carolina Central College graduate, was a musical "genius," several who played with him say. Jones got him to join a local band in Kinston led by Willie Moore, but then Jones "disappeared," Knight said, soon after being fired from his second band director job in a month. Meanwhile, Knight had gone to a club to see the Monitors perform and sat in with them on a number. Myers was impressed, and it helped to learn that Knight was also an Omega—Myers a member of the Omega Psi Phi national fraternity at Virginia State and Knight at FAMU. Knight's first stint with the Monitors lasted about a month. Nat Jones had been hired as James Brown's band director and arranger and brought on board Melvin and Maceo Parker before he called Knight to join Brown's band in May 1964 at the Apollo. Knight was part of the "Papa's Got a Brand New Bag" recording session at Arthur "Guitar Boogie" Smith's Charlotte, NC studio, and also is featured on Grits & Soul. Knight's long musical road brought him back to the Monitors for the last 16 years of their performance run.

== Awards ==
Awards and nominations
Award	Wins	Nominations

1984 Terry Sanford Award for Creative Innovation in Teaching & Administration.

2014 The North Carolina Heritage Award

2017 The Brown-Hudson Folklore Award, North Carolina Folklore Society.

2024 Wilson, NC Humanitarian of the Year, Wilson City Council.
