= Bill Myers (author) =

American author and film director (born 1953)

Bill Myers is an American Christian author, film director and film producer. He was born in Seattle, Washington on September 9, 1953.

Myers is most notable for the animated series McGee and Me! He is an author of books from many genres, including comedy, horror, thriller, fiction, and non-fiction. He has written over 80 books.

== Biography ==
Myers attended the University of Washington and the Italian State Institute for Cinema and Television and began writing and directing independent films. Later he began to write books and novels for children, teens, and adults in the inspirational market.

His video series McGee and Me! is about a typically average, mild-mannered boy named Nicholas Martin, who has what appears to be an imaginary friend named McGee. The series chronicles the boy's adventures, ending with him learning a moral or spiritual lesson.

He is the author of Bloodhounds Inc., a series of Christian comedy/detective books for children. Beginning in 2001, Marcia Silen Films produced a video/DVD series adapted from Bloodhounds, Inc. which featured Richard Thomas and Richard Kiel. Another children's book series he authored is "The Incredible Worlds of Wally McDoogle."

Myers also writes adult novels; his 2000 novel Eli presents the story of Jesus transposed to a contemporary setting. He has authored books for children, teens, and adults. He is president of Amaris Media International, a TV, film, and media production company.

== Filmography ==
- Where Eagles Fly (1977)
- My Brothers Keeper (1978)
- A Long Way Home (1980)
- More Than a Champion (1981)
- The Winning Circle (1981)
- One Heartbeat Away (1982)
- Cry Freedom (1982)
- Choices (1983)
- Bamboo in Winter (1990)
- Secret Agent Dingledorf and His Trusty Dog, Splat (2019)
- McGee and Me!
  - The Not-So-Great Escape (1989)
  - Big Lie (1990)
  - Skate Expectations (1990)
  - Star in the Breaking (1990)
  - Twas the Fight Before Christmas (1990)
  - Twister and Shout (1990)
  - Take Me Out of the Ball Game (1993)

== Works ==
=== Series ===
- Journeys to Fayrah / The Imager Chronicles (different names for the same series), collected as the Bloodstone Chronicles
- The Incredible Worlds of Wally McDoogle
- Forbidden Doors
- Fire of Heaven
  - Blood of Heaven, (ISBN 0-7862-1958-0)
  - Threshold
  - Fire of Heaven
- Eli
- The Face of God
- When the Last Leaf Falls
- The Judas Gospel
- The God Hater
- Bloodhounds Inc.
- Secret Agent Dingledorf And His Trusty Dog, Splat
- Soul Tracker
- The Presence
- The Seeing
- TJ and the Time Stumblers
- The Elijah Project
- Truth Seekers
- Harbingers

=== Novels ===
- Eli (2000), (ISBN 0-310-25114-1)
- When the Last Leaf Falls (2001), (ISBN 0-310-23091-8)
- The Face of God (2002), (ISBN 0-310-22755-0)
- The Wager (2003), (ISBN 0-310-24873-6)
- The Voice (2008), (ISBN 978-0-446-69799-6)
- The God Hater (2010), (ISBN 978-1-4391-5326-0)
- "Angel of Wrath" (2009), (ISBN 978-0-446-69800-9)
- " truth seekers" the machine (2013) (ISBN 978-1-4336-9080-8)

=== Bloodhounds, Inc. series ===
1. The Ghost of KRZY (1997), ISBN 1-55661-890-5
2. The Mystery of The Invisible Knight (1997), ISBN 1-55661-891-3
3. Phantom of the Haunted Church (1998), ISBN 1-55661-892-1
4. Invasion of the UFO's (1998), ISBN 1-55661-893-X
5. Fangs for the Memories (1999), ISBN 1-55661-489-6
6. Case of the Missing Minds (1999) ISBN 1-55661-490-X
7. The Secret of the Ghostly Hot Rod (2000) ISBN 1-55661-491-8
8. I Want My Mummy (2000) ISBN 1-55661-492-6
9. The Curse of the Horrible Hair Day (2001) ISBN 0-7642-2437-9
10. The Scam of the Screwball Wizards (2001) ISBN 0-7642-2438-7
11. Mystery of the Melodies from Mars (2002) ISBN 0-7642-2623-1
12. Room with a Boo (2002) ISBN 0-7642-2624-X

=== Non fiction ===
- The Dark Side of the Supernatural: Learning What Is of God...and What Is Not (1999), (with David Wimbish) (ISBN 0-7642-2151-5) Remake (2008)
- Faith Encounter (1999), (ISBN 0-7369-0158-2)
- Just Believe It: Faith in the Real Stuff (2001), (ISBN 0-7369-0287-2)
- The Jesus Experience
- When God Happens I
- When God Happens II

== Additional bibliography ==
- Hot Topics, Tough Questions (1987)
- Jesus: An Eyewitness Account (1988)
- More Hot Topics (1989)
- More Hot Topics: Rip Offs (1989)
- Christ, B.C: Becoming Closer Friends with the Hidden Christ of the Old Testament (1990)
- Baseball for Breakfast: The Story of a Boy Who Hated to Wait (1999)
- Then Comes Marriage: A Novella (2001) (with Angela Elwell Hunt)

== Websites ==
- Author's Official Website
- Author's Official Children's Books Website
- Zondervan Profile
- Bill Myers information
- Bill Myers at IMDb
- Internet Book List For McGee and Me
- Complete Wally McDoogle book list
