= Red Wilson (musician) =

American musician

Oscar O. "Red" Wilson (February 20, 1920 – June 6, 2005) was an American musician and fiddle-maker who played old-time and bluegrass music in North Carolina. He is also the founder of Mayland Recording Studios.

== Biography ==
Wilson grew up in Avery County where he learned traditional fiddle and banjo tunes of western North Carolina. In 1941, he was drafted into the army and served in North Africa and Sicily during World War II. He was honored with the Purple Heart by the end of his military service.

In the 1950s, Wilson joined the local band Toe River Valley Boys as a fiddler. The group played at many square dances in Little Switzerland. During his time with the band, Wilson composed tunes that combined traditional elements with more commercial bluegrass elements.

After retiring, Wilson performed at local festivals and music workshops. He was also the operator of the Mayfield Recording Studios in Spruce Pine. He was honored with the North Carolina Heritage Award in 2003 before dying two years later in Bakersville.
