= Netter =

Netter is a surname, and may refer to:

== People ==
- Charles Netter (1826–1882), Zionist leader
- Claude Netter (1924–2007), French Olympic champion foil fencer
- Douglas Netter (1921–2017), American film producer, founder of Netter Digital
- Frank H. Netter (1906–1991), American medical illustrator
- Mildrette Netter (born 1948), American sprinter
- Nadine Netter (born 1944), American tennis player
- Thomas Netter (c. 1375–1430), English theologian and controversialist

== Settlement ==
- Kfar Netter, a moshav in central Israel, named after Charles Netter
