= Billmeyer =

Billmeyer is a surname. Notable people with the surname include:

- Alexander Billmeyer (1841–1924), American politician
- Mick Billmeyer (born 1964), American baseball player and coach
- Kalan Billmeyer (born 2008), American teen girl
