= Bill Myers (baseball) =

American baseball player

- Catcher
- Born: October 31, 1886; Brooklyn, New York, U.S.

Negro league baseball debut
- 1908, for the Brooklyn Royal Giants

Last appearance
- 1921, for the Cleveland Tate Stars

Teams
- Brooklyn Royal Giants (1908, 1910); Cleveland Tate Stars (1921)

William Vandeveer Myers (October 31, 1886 – death date unknown) was an American Negro league catcher between 1908 and 1921.

A native of Brooklyn, New York, Myers made his Negro leagues debut in 1908 with the Brooklyn Royal Giants. He played for Brooklyn again in 1910, and went on to play for the Cleveland Tate Stars in 1921.
