= Bill H. Myers =

American actor (born 1956)

Bill H. Myers (born April 9, 1956) is an American actor. He is a member of the American Federation of Television and Radio Artists and the Screen Actors Guild. Because SAG does not allow the same name to be used by anyone else more than once, Bill Myers had to use his middle initial of H as part of his name. He is usually credited under the name of Bill Myers. He has been married to Claudia Krieger since April 29, 1993.

Among Bill's other credits, he is most known for his soap opera role as Bill Harrison on ABC's General Hospital. Initially when he was cast in 1980, he was only supposed to be on the show for two weeks, but his role was expanded because of a lucky break with a storyline he was involved in with actor Anthony Geary. By 1990 when the storyline he was involved in had ended, he had taped over 800 shows in an 11-year run. After a one-year hiatus, he unofficially retired from acting. From that point on he mainly concentrated on writing television and movie scripts while promoting them through his production company.

Actor Will Geer of the TV show The Waltons was his mentor. His best advice to 18-year-old Bill when he wanted to make acting his profession was, "Make sure that you have something to fall back on." On that advice, he started his own production company at the age of 20.

Bob Hope awarded him first place in a baby contest when he was one year old.

He was a standup comic at the famous Comedy Store on Sunset Strip where comedian Jimmie Walker used to introduce him as the "White Shadow".

He worked at the Egyptian Theatre in Hollywood with actress Charlene Tilton when she was 18 and he was 20.

Later on, as an assistant manager at Mann's Chinese Theatre, he hired actress Michele Greene for her first job.
