= North Carolina Arts Council =

The North Carolina Arts Council is an organization in the U.S. state of North Carolina that provides grants to artists, musicians and arts organizations. The group's mission is "arts for all people." It was founded by executive order in 1964 by Governor Terry Sanford, and it became a statutory state agency on April 11, 1967. It is an agency of the North Carolina Department of Natural and Cultural Resources, which is the United States' first cabinet-level state agency for the arts, history and libraries. It operates from headquarters in Raleigh.

The organization's first chair was Sam Ragan, followed by Martin Lancaster. Each year since 1989 it has presented the North Carolina Folk Heritage Award. The agency issues a number of grants to support artists and arts organizations in North Carolina.

On June 21, 2017, the study "Arts & Economic Prosperity 5: The Economic Impact of Nonprofit Arts and Culture Organizations and Their Audiences in North Carolina." was released. It showed the nonprofit arts and culture sector in North Carolina generated $2.12 billion in direct economic activity and supported almost 72,000 full time jobs in 2015. The North Carolina Arts Council sponsored the study and partnered with Americans for the Arts on the study.

The newest October 2023 study released by Americans for the Arts, (AFTA) found that nonprofit arts and culture organizations generated $151.7 billion - $73.3B in organizational spending and an additional $78.4B in event-related revenue nationwide. North Carolina generated $2.23 billion in economic impact - $1.05B in spending by nonprofit arts and culture organizations, $1.18B in event spending, 37977 jobs supported and $439M in tax local, state and federal tax receipts.

== See also ==
- ARTS North Carolina
