= National Register of Historic Places listings in Union County, South Carolina =

Location of Union County in South Carolina

This is a list of the National Register of Historic Places listings in Union County, South Carolina.

This is intended to be a complete list of the properties and districts on the National Register of Historic Places in Union County, South Carolina, United States. The locations of National Register properties and districts for which the latitude and longitude coordinates are included below, may be seen in a map.

There are 31 properties and districts listed on the National Register in the county.

This National Park Service list is complete through NPS recent listings posted March 14, 2025.

== Current listings ==
	Name on the Register	Image	Date listed	Location	City or town	Description
1	Battle of Blackstock's Historic Site	Battle of Blackstock's Historic Site	December 16, 1974 (#74001885)	West of Union off South Carolina Highway 49; 34°40′45″N 81°48′45″W	Union	
2	Buffalo Mill Historic District	Buffalo Mill Historic District	October 10, 1990 (#90001506)	Village of Buffalo and immediate surroundings 34°43′23″N 81°40′39″W	Buffalo	
3	Cedar Bluff	Cedar Bluff	July 20, 1974 (#74001886)	South Carolina Highway 49; 34°39′47″N 81°44′34″W	Union	
4	Central Graded School	Central Graded School	March 30, 1978 (#78002534)	309 Academy St. 34°43′03″N 81°37′17″W	Union	
5	Clinton Chapel African Methodist Episcopal Zion Church	Clinton Chapel African Methodist Episcopal Zion Church	March 12, 2020 (#100005047)	108 South Enterprise St. 34°42′51″N 81°37′34″W	Union	
6	Corinth Baptist Church	Corinth Baptist Church	July 20, 1989 (#89000939)	N. Herndon St. 34°42′59″N 81°37′30″W	Union	
7	Cross Keys House	Cross Keys House	June 24, 1971 (#71000811)	Southwest of Union on South Carolina Highway 49; 34°38′03″N 81°46′27″W	Cross Keys	
8	Culp House	Culp House	April 9, 1975 (#75001709)	300 N. Mountain St. 34°43′10″N 81°37′19″W	Union	
9	Judge Thomas Dawkins House	Judge Thomas Dawkins House	April 23, 1973 (#73001735)	Dawkins Court, north of E. Main St. 34°43′07″N 81°37′15″W	Union	
10	East Main Street-Douglass Heights Historic District	East Main Street-Douglass Heights Historic District	July 17, 1989 (#89000796)	Roughly bounded by Perrin Ave., S. Church St., and E. Main St., and 100-121 Douglass Heights; 34°42′57″N 81°36′58″W	Union	
11	Episcopal Church of the Nativity	Episcopal Church of the Nativity	August 30, 1974 (#74001881)	Church and Pinckney Sts. 34°42′31″N 81°37′14″W	Union	
12	Fair Forest Hotel	Fair Forest Hotel	November 1, 1984 (#84000346)	221 E. Main St. 34°42′56″N 81°37′20″W	Union	
13	Nathaniel Gist House	Nathaniel Gist House	February 11, 2011 (#11000015)	162 Fant Acres Rd. 34°42′01″N 81°28′40″W	Union	
14	Herndon Terrace	Herndon Terrace	August 25, 1970 (#70000604)	N. Pinckney St. and Catherine St. 34°43′28″N 81°37′45″W	Union	
15	Hillside	Hillside	February 17, 1978 (#78002533)	Northwest of Carlisle on South Carolina Highway 215; 34°36′04″N 81°28′37″W	Carlisle	
16	Gov. Thomas B. Jeter House	Gov. Thomas B. Jeter House	December 2, 1974 (#74001882)	203 Thompson Boulevard; 34°43′18″N 81°37′38″W	Union	
17	McWhirter House	McWhirter House	April 18, 2003 (#03000272)	415 Pacolet St. 34°49′59″N 81°40′54″W	Jonesville	
18	Means House	Means House	April 13, 1973 (#73001734)	2 miles southwest of Jonesville on South Carolina Highway 12; 34°48′34″N 81°42′55″W	Jonesville	
19	Meng House	Meng House	July 12, 1976 (#76001714)	117 Academy St. 34°43′08″N 81°37′24″W	Union	
20	Merridun	Merridun	June 20, 1974 (#74001883)	100 Merridun Pl. 34°43′10″N 81°37′48″W	Union	
21	Musgrove's Mill Historic Battle Site	Musgrove's Mill Historic Battle Site	March 4, 1975 (#75001708)	2.5 miles south of Cross Anchor on South Carolina Highway 56; 34°36′06″N 81°51′02″W	Cross Anchor	
22	Padgett's Creek Baptist Church	Padgett's Creek Baptist Church	May 6, 1971 (#71000810)	843 Old Buncombe Rd, Union, South Carolina; 34°37′30″N 81°44′42″W	Cross Keys	
23	Pinckneyville	Pinckneyville	December 3, 1969 (#69000175)	13 miles northeast of Union off South Carolina Highway 105; 34°30′44″N 81°28′10″W	Union	
24	Rose Hill	Rose Hill	June 5, 1970 (#70000605)	9 miles south-southwest of Union on County Road 16; 34°36′19″N 81°39′57″W	Union	
25	Sims High School		September 20, 2023 (#100009382)	200 Sims Dr. 34°42′26″N 81°37′04″W	Union	
26	South Street-South Church Street Historic District	South Street-South Church Street Historic District	May 19, 1983 (#83002211)	Roughly South St. between Church and Boyce Sts.; also roughly S. Church St. from South St. to Henrietta St. 34°42′42″N 81°37′29″W	Union	Second set of boundaries represents a boundary increase of July 17, 1989
27	Union Community Hospital	Union Community Hospital	August 1, 1996 (#96000835)	213 W. Main St. 34°42′52″N 81°37′32″W	Union	
28	Union County Jail	Union County Jail	August 30, 1974 (#74001884)	Main St. 34°42′55″N 81°37′38″W	Union	
29	Union Downtown Historic District	Union Downtown Historic District	July 17, 1989 (#89000795)	Roughly bounded by E. Academy, N. Church, Main, and N. Herndon Sts., Sharpe Ave., and N. Gadberry St.; also 125-129 W. Main St. 34°42′55″N 81°37′23″W	Union	125-129 W. Main represents a boundary increase of April 11, 2003
30	Union High School-Main Street Grammar School	Union High School-Main Street Grammar School	July 20, 1989 (#89000797)	E. Main and N. Church Sts. 34°42′58″N 81°37′12″W	Union	
31	Woodland Plantation	Woodland Plantation	May 30, 2001 (#01000607)	3435 Santuc-Carlisle Highway-South Carolina Highway 215; 34°37′23″N 81°29′43″W	Carlisle	

== See also ==
- List of National Historic Landmarks in South Carolina
- National Register of Historic Places listings in South Carolina
