= Episcopal Church of the Nativity =

Episcopal Church of the Nativity may refer to:

- Episcopal Church of the Nativity (Huntsville, Alabama), listed on the National Register of Historic Places in Madison County, Alabama
- Episcopal Church of the Nativity (Union, South Carolina), listed on the National Register of Historic Places in Union County, South Carolina
