= Union Community Hospital =

Geography
- Location: Union, South Carolina, United States

Organization
- Type: General

History
- Constructed: 1915
- Opened: December 1932
- Closed: 1958

Links
- Lists: Hospitals in South Carolina
- Union Community Hospital
- U.S. National Register of Historic Places
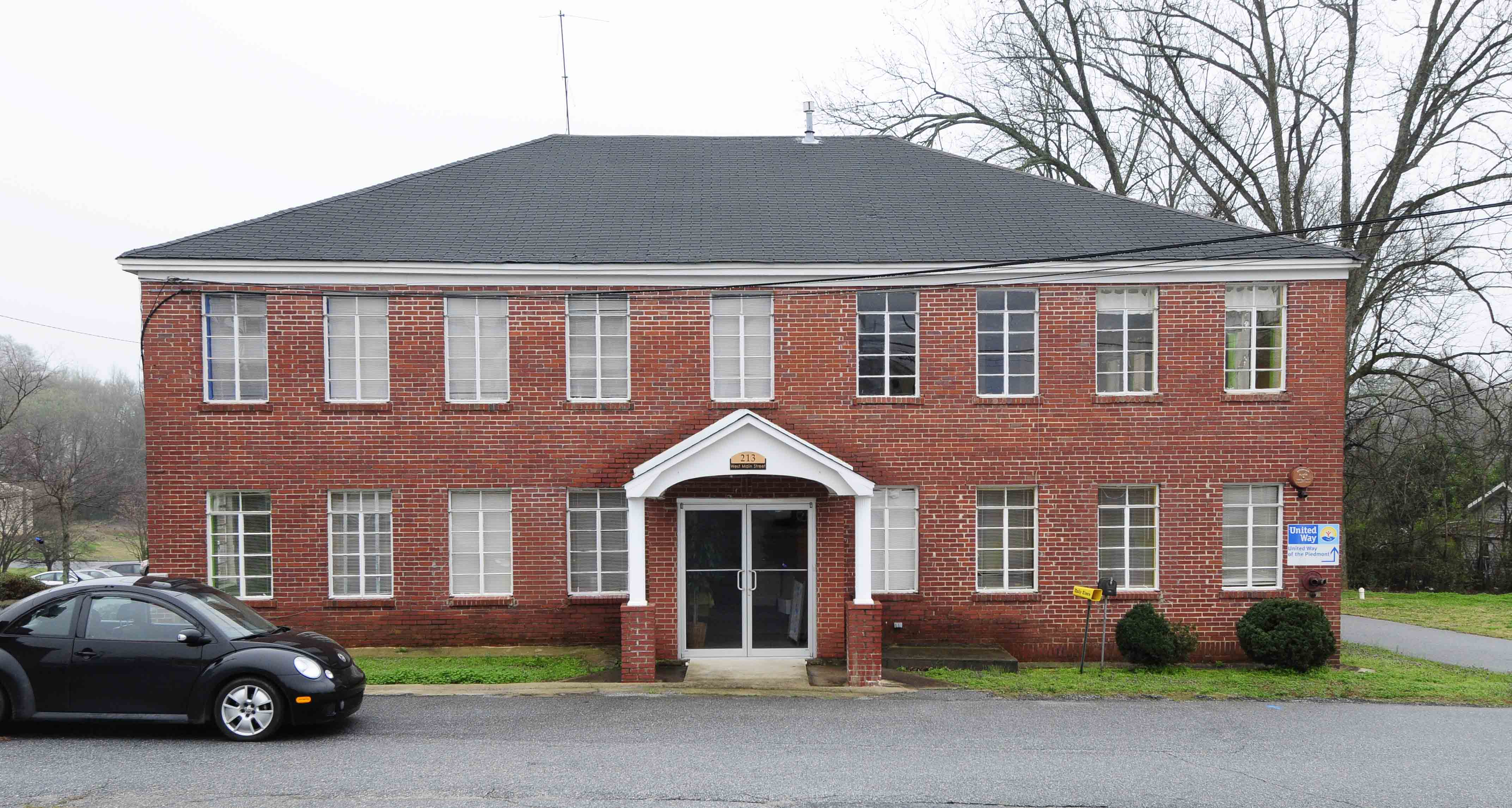
- Union County Community Hospital, March 2012

- Location within South Carolina Location within the United States
- Location: 213 W. Main St., Union, South Carolina
- Coordinates: 34°42′52″N 81°37′32″W
- Area: 2 acres (0.81 ha)
- Built: c. 1915, 1949
- Architectural style: Classical Revival
- MPS: Union MPS
- NRHP reference No.: 96000835
- Added to NRHP: August 1, 1996

Union Community Hospital is a historic hospital building for African-American patients during segregation located at Union, Union County, South Carolina. The front section was built about 1915 as a frame residence, and is a two-story building on which a brick veneer was placed in the 1930s, with Neo-Classical style design elements. The brick rear section was added in 1949. The Union Community Hospital was founded in December 1932, and provided services to the African-American community of Union County for 43 years.

It was added to the National Register of Historic Places in 1996.
