= Culp House =

Historic house in South Carolina, United States

- U.S. National Register of Historic Places
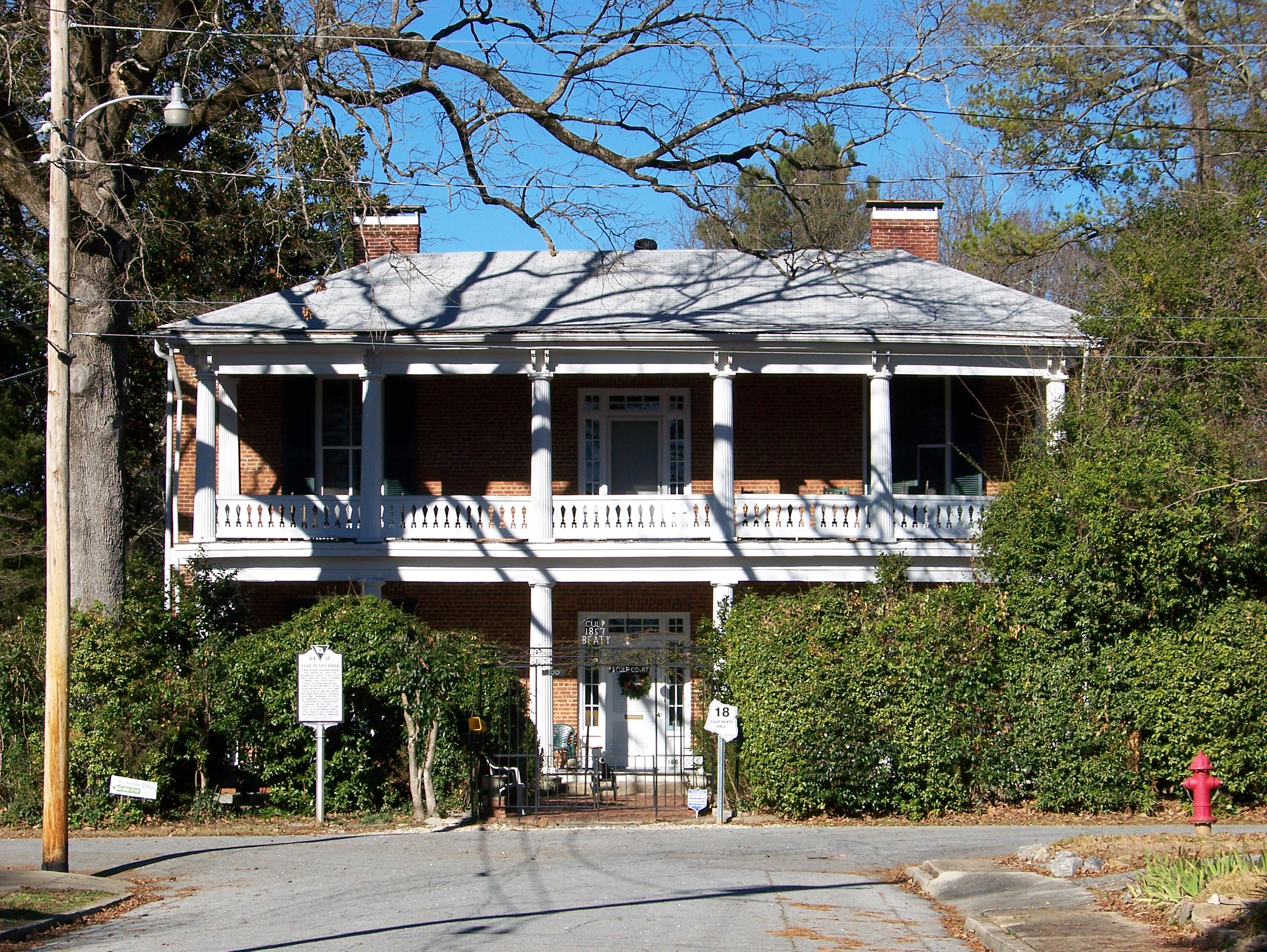

- Location within South Carolina Location within the United States
- Location: 300 N. Mountain St., Union, South Carolina
- Coordinates: 34°43′10″N 81°37′19″W
- Area: 2 acres (0.81 ha)
- Built: c. 1857
- Architectural style: Georgian, Classical Revival
- NRHP reference No.: 75001709
- Added to NRHP: April 9, 1975

Culp House is a historic home located at Union, Union County, South Carolina. It was built about 1857, and is a two-story, brick structure, with Georgian and Neo-Classical design details. The front façade features a two-tiered, five-bay porch with Doric order columns.

Wade Hampton III delivered a speech from the front porch in 1876.

It was added to the National Register of Historic Places in 1975.
