= Union Downtown Historic District =

Historic district in South Carolina, United States

- U.S. National Register of Historic Places
- U.S. Historic district
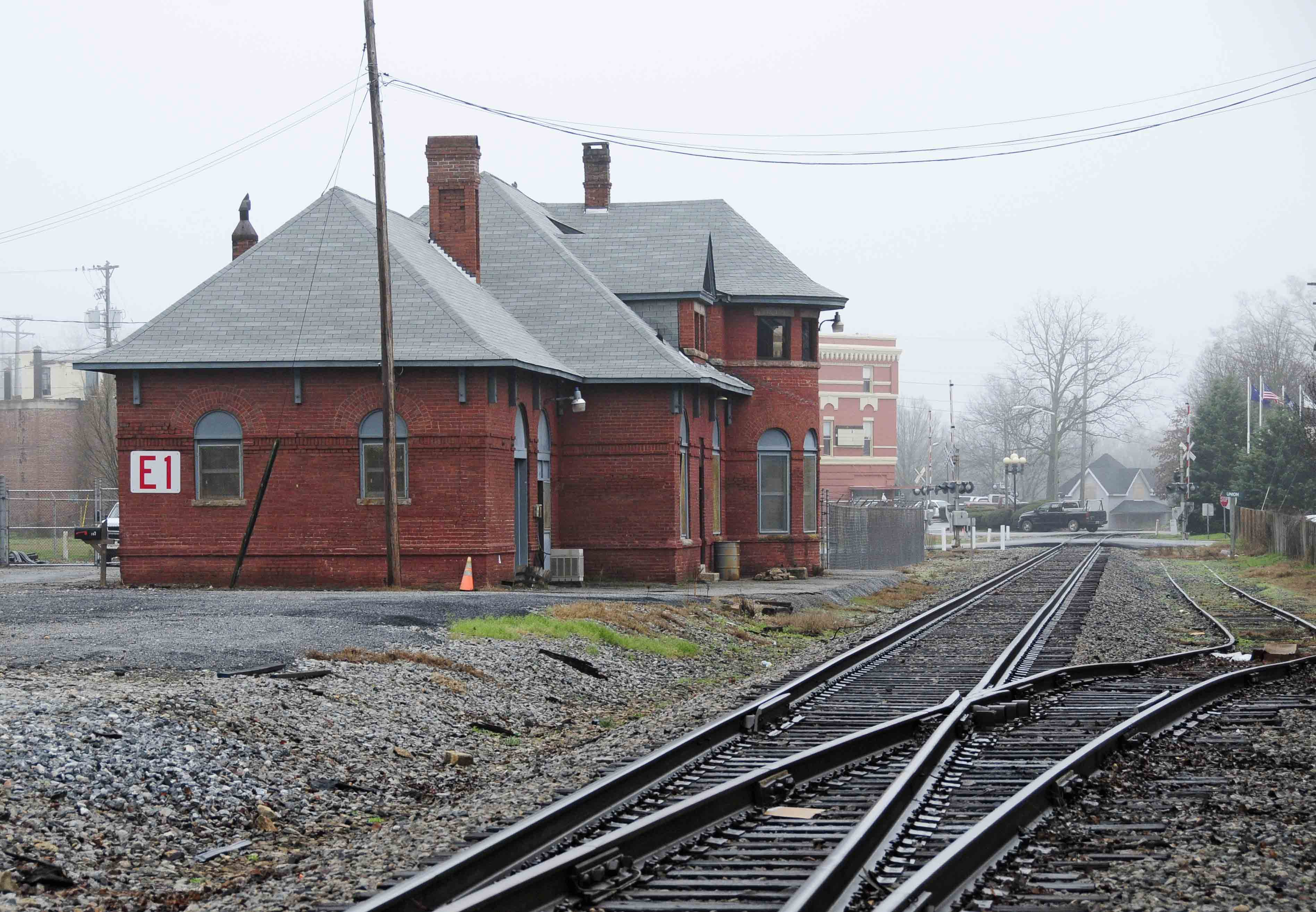
- Union Depot, Union Downtown Historic District, March 2012

- Location within South Carolina Location within the United States
- Location: Roughly bounded by E. Academy, N. Church, Main, and N. Herndon Sts., Sharpe Ave., and N. Gadberry St., Union, South Carolina
- Coordinates: 34°42′55″N 81°37′23″W
- Area: 110.1 acres (44.6 ha)
- Architectural style: Late 19th And Early 20th Century American Movements
- MPS: Union MPS
- NRHP reference No.: 89000795, 03000206 (Boundary Increase)
- Added to NRHP: July 17, 1989, April 11, 2003 (Boundary Increase)

Union Downtown Historic District is a national historic district located at Union, Union County, South Carolina. The district encompasses 48 contributing buildings in the central business district of Union. The commercial, public, residential, industrial, and transportation-related buildings were built between about 1878 to about 1940, with the majority dating from about 1880 to about 1930. The district includes buildings representative of the Neo-Classical and Victorian styles. Notable buildings include the Union County Courthouse, Union Post Office/Federal Building, Flynn Building, Krass Building, People's State Bank/Arthur State Bank, Union Depot, Union Cotton Oil Mill, and Union Hardware Co. Located in the district is the separately listed Fair Forest Hotel.

It was added to the National Register of Historic Places in 1989, with a boundary increase in 2003.
