= Herndon Terrace =

Historic house in South Carolina, United States

- U.S. National Register of Historic Places
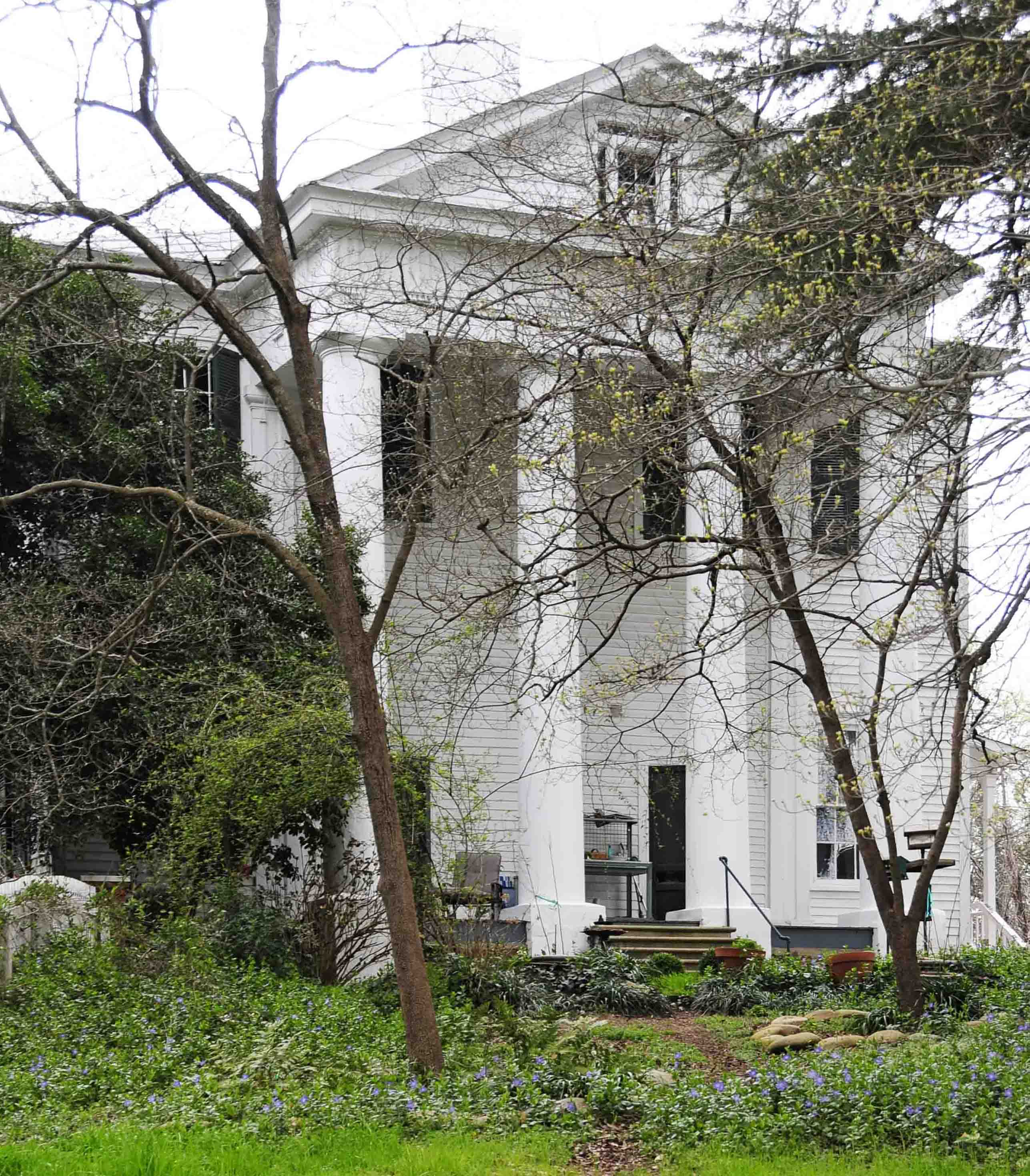
- Herndon Terrace, March 2012

- Location within South Carolina Location within the United States
- Location: N. Pinckney St. and Catherine St., Union, South Carolina
- Coordinates: 34°43′28″N 81°37′45″W
- Area: 9.9 acres (4.0 ha)
- Built: c. 1845-1848
- Architectural style: Greek Revival
- NRHP reference No.: 70000604
- Added to NRHP: August 25, 1970

Herndon Terrace, also known as W.E. Thomson House, is a historic home located at Union, Union County, South Carolina. It was built about 1845–1848, and is a two-story, Greek Revival style frame dwelling. It features massive columned porticos on three sides, with solid brick columns covered with stucco. Also on the property are a once separate kitchen, that now adjoins the house, and an old slave cabin and cistern.

It was added to the National Register of Historic Places in 1970.
