= Judge Thomas Dawkins House =

Historic house in South Carolina, United States

- U.S. National Register of Historic Places
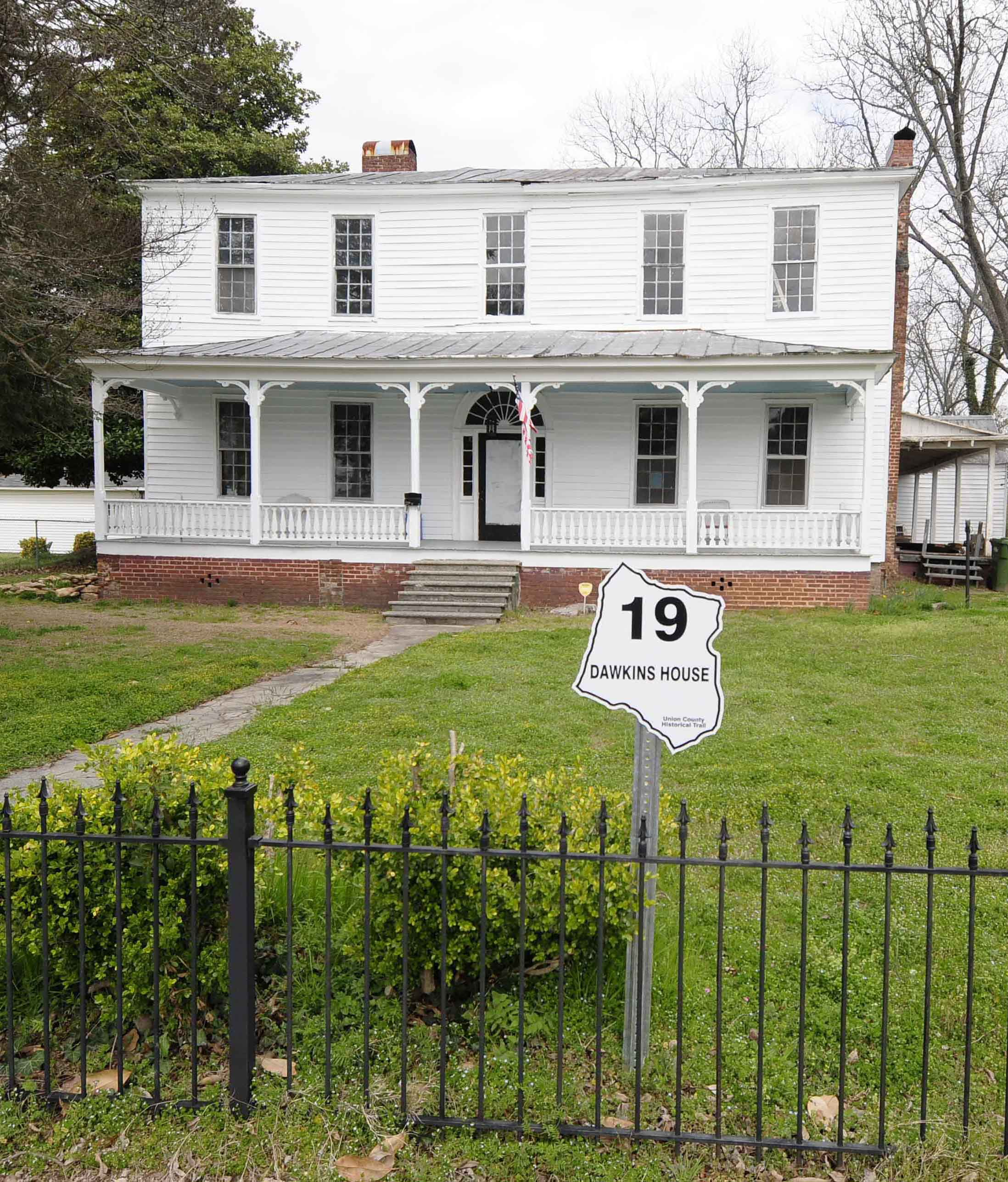
- Dawkins House, March 2012

- Location within South Carolina Location within the United States
- Location: Dawkins Court, N of E. Main St., Union, South Carolina
- Coordinates: 34°43′7″N 81°37′15″W
- Area: 0.3 acres (0.12 ha)
- Built: c. 1845
- NRHP reference No.: 73001735
- Added to NRHP: April 23, 1973

Judge Thomas Dawkins House, also known as The Shrubs, is a historic home located at Union, Union County, South Carolina. It was built about 1845, and is a two-story clapboard dwelling with a hipped metal roof. The front facade features a five-bay wide verandah supported by six chamfered columns. It was the residence of Judge Thomas Dawkins, a well-known political leader in Union County during and after the American Civil War.

It was added to the National Register of Historic Places in 1973.
