= Nathaniel Gist House =

Historic house in South Carolina, United States

- U.S. National Register of Historic Places
- U.S. Historic district
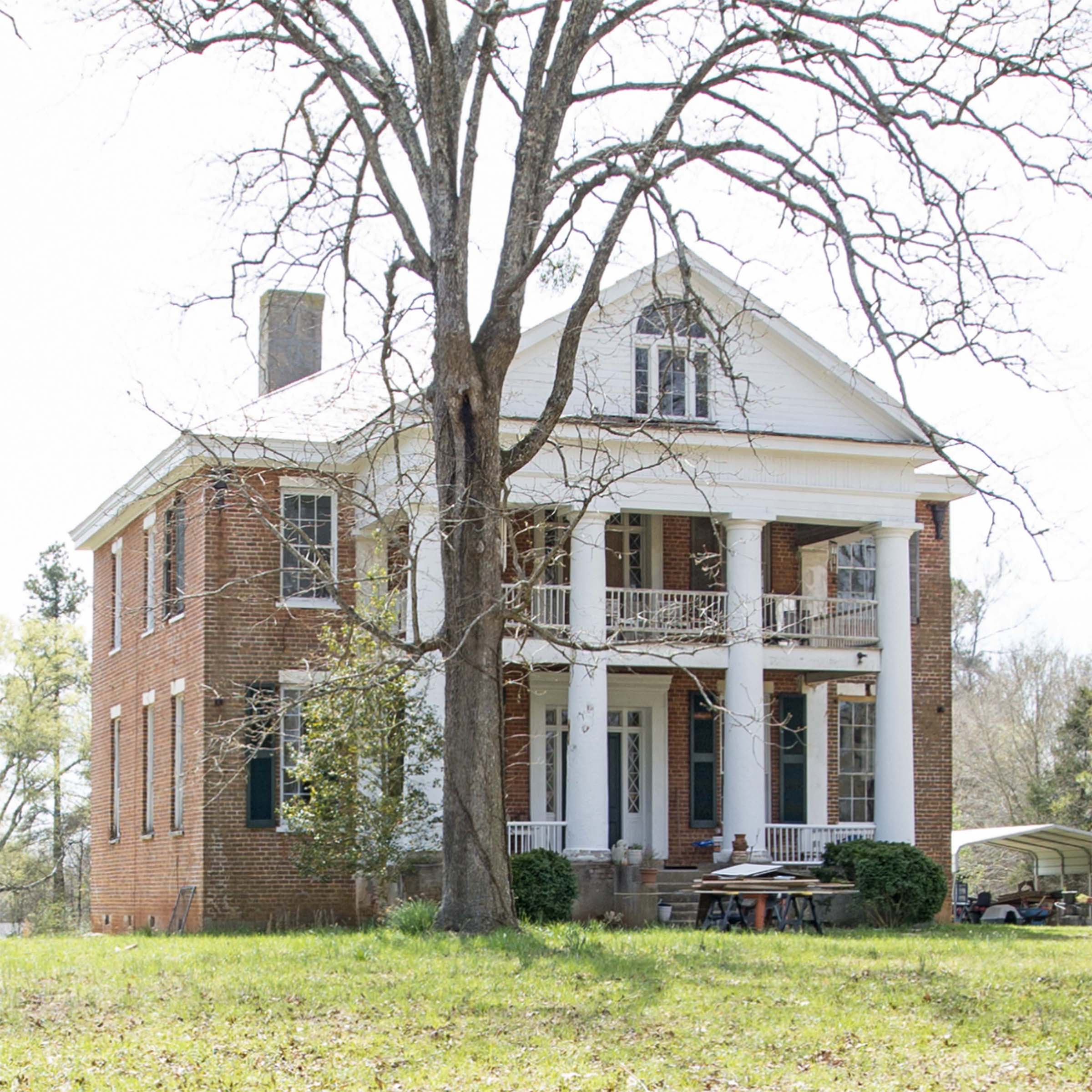
- Nathaniel Gist House, March 2012

- Location within South Carolina Location within the United States
- Location: 162 Fant Acres Rd., near Union, South Carolina
- Coordinates: 34°42′12″N 81°28′48″W
- Area: 21 acres (8.5 ha)
- NRHP reference No.: 11000015
- Added to NRHP: February 11, 2011

Nathaniel Gist House is a historic home located near Union, Union County, South Carolina. It was built in 1855, and is a two-story, Greek Revival brick dwelling. It features a stuccoed white, brick-columned portico. Also on the property is a stone-lined circular well constructed with stones from the Broad River and capped with pecked granite slabs.

It was added to the National Register of Historic Places in 2011.
