= Merridun =

Historic house in South Carolina, United States

- U.S. National Register of Historic Places
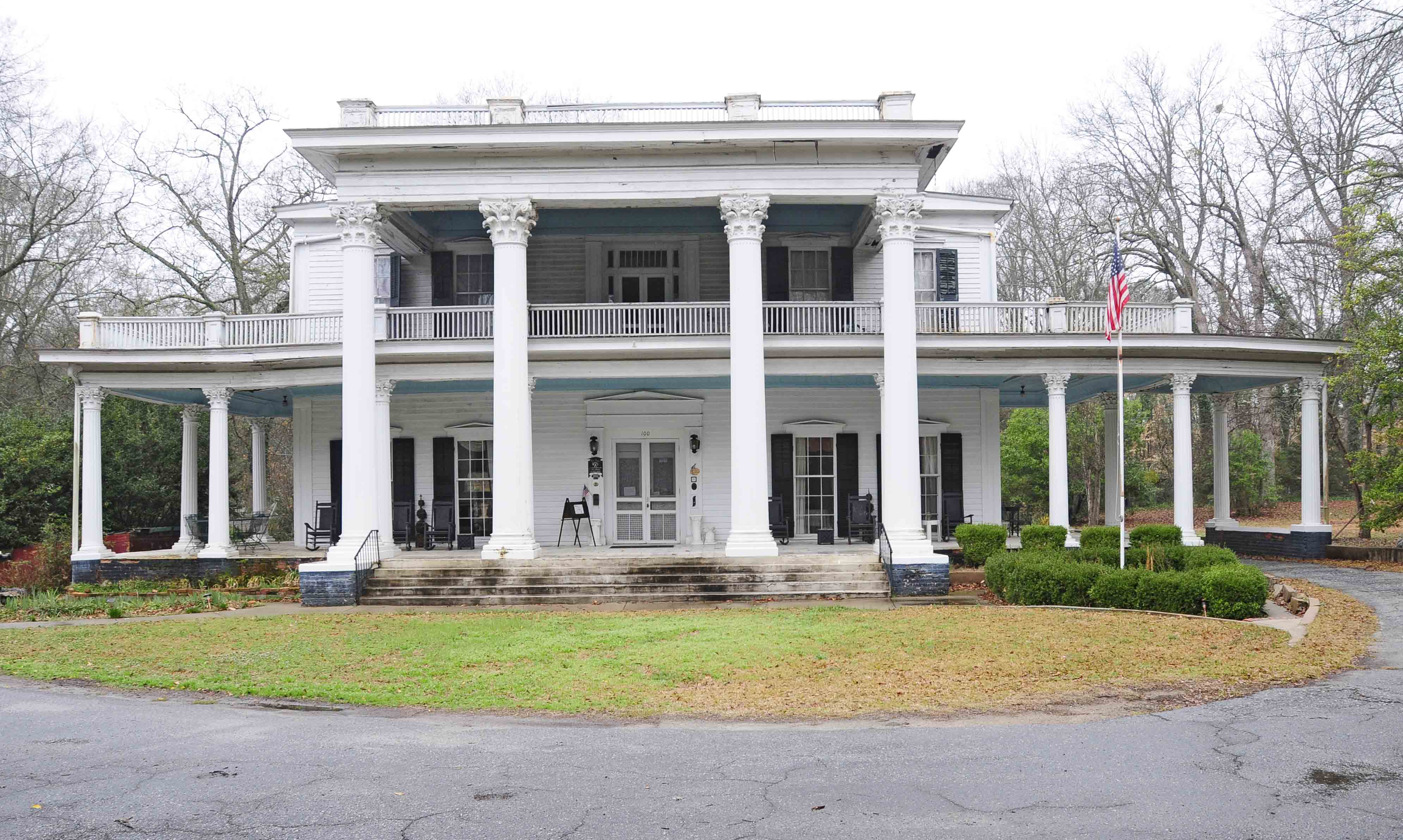
- Merridun, March 2012

- Location within South Carolina Location within the United States
- Location: 100 Merridun Pl., Union, South Carolina
- Coordinates: 34°43′10″N 81°37′48″W
- Area: 4 acres (1.6 ha)
- Built: c. 1855
- Built by: Keenan, W.J.
- Architectural style: Georgian, Classical Revival
- NRHP reference No.: 74001883
- Added to NRHP: June 20, 1974

Merridun is a historic home located at Union, Union County, South Carolina. It was built about 1855, and is a two-story, Georgian style frame dwelling. It features a massive two-storied Neoclassical portico with Corinthian order columns. It shelters a one-story verandah that extends partially around both sides of the house.

It was added to the National Register of Historic Places in 1974.
