= Central Graded School =

- U.S. National Register of Historic Places
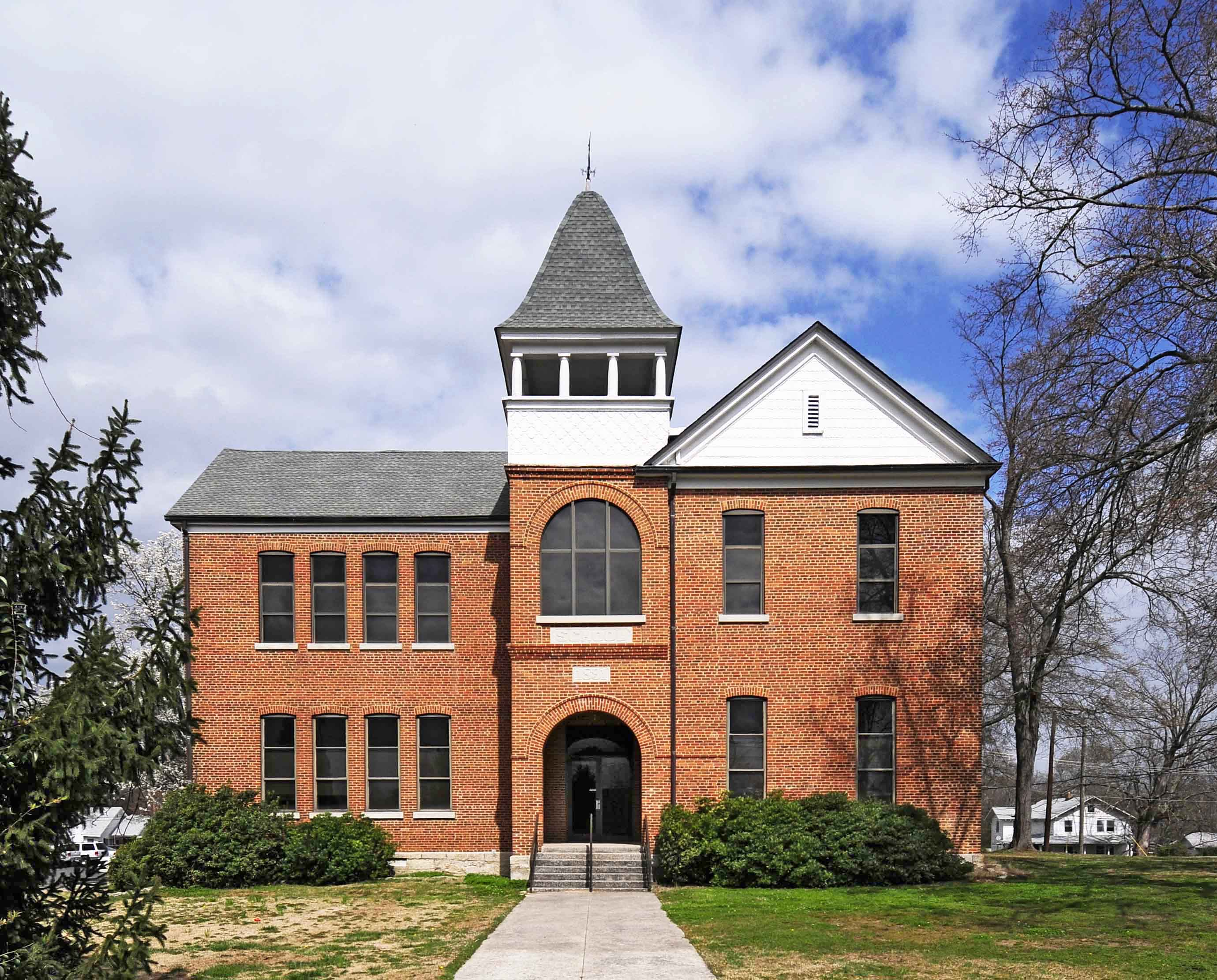
- Central Graded School, March 2012

- Location within South Carolina Location within the United States
- Location: 309 Academy St., Union, South Carolina
- Coordinates: 34°43′3″N 81°37′17″W
- Area: 2 acres (0.81 ha)
- Built: 1891, 1899, 1904, c. 1930
- Architectural style: Richardsonian Romanesque
- NRHP reference No.: 78002534
- Added to NRHP: March 30, 1978

Central Graded School, also known as Central School, is a historic school building located at Union, Union County, South Carolina. It was built in 1891, and is a two-story, T-shaped Richardsonian Romanesque style brick building with the square bell tower. Rear additions were built in 1899, 1904, and about 1930.

The building was added to the National Register of Historic Places in 1978. It is currently used by the University of South Carolina Union.
