= Meng House =

Historic house in South Carolina, United States

- U.S. National Register of Historic Places
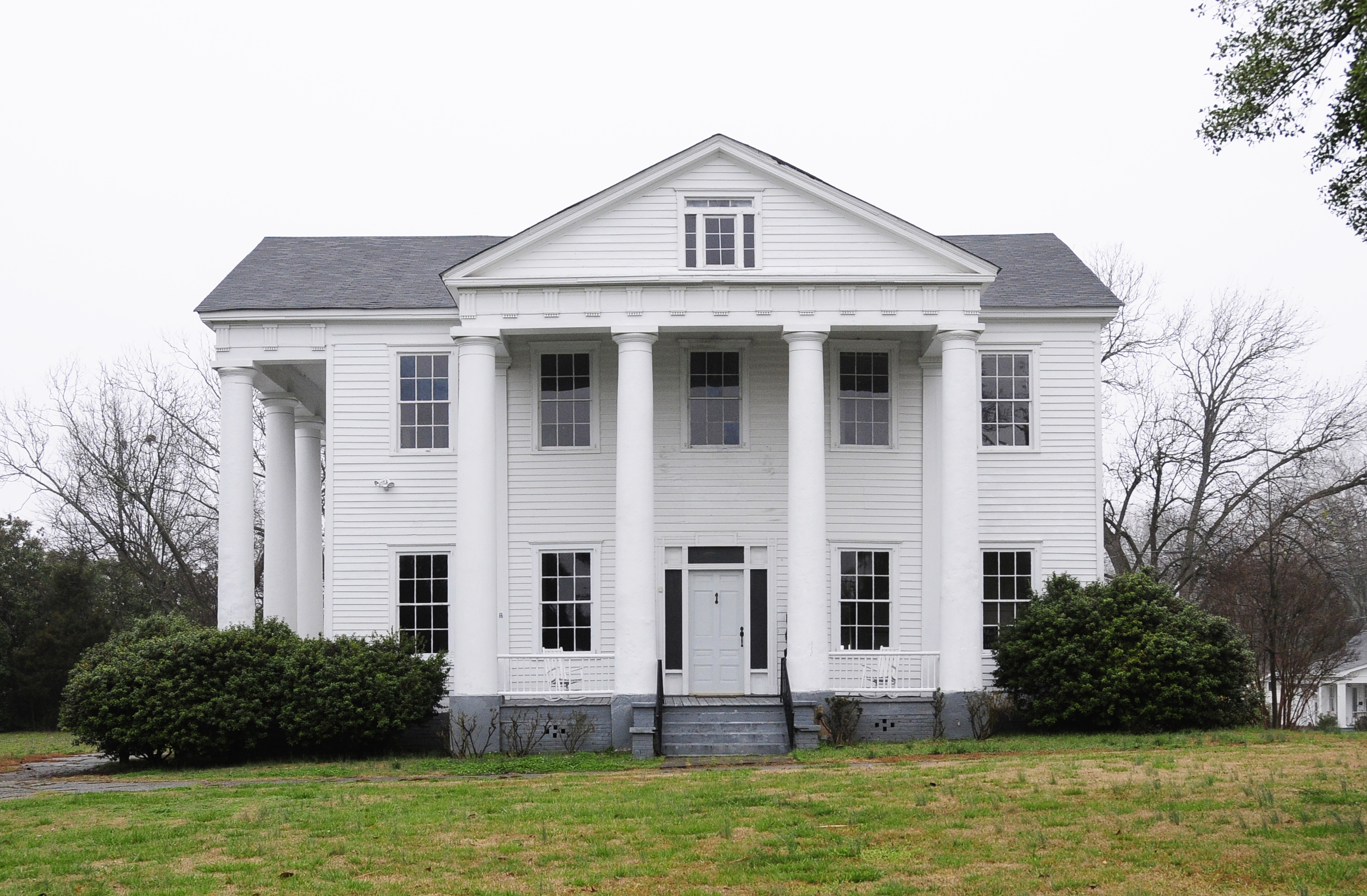
- Meng House, March 2012

- Location within South Carolina Location within the United States
- Location: 117 Academy St., Union, South Carolina
- Coordinates: 34°43′8″N 81°37′24″W
- Area: 1 acre (0.40 ha)
- Built: c. 1832
- Architectural style: Greek Revival
- NRHP reference No.: 76001714
- Added to NRHP: July 12, 1976

Meng House, also known as The Hill House and Clough-Wallace House, is a historic home located at Union in Union County, South Carolina, United States. It was built about 1832, and is a two-story, Greek Revival style frame dwelling. It features two two-story Doric order porticos supported by four stucco-over-brick columns. It has a two-story wing that houses the kitchen with bathrooms above.

It was added to the National Register of Historic Places in 1976.
