= South Street–South Church Street Historic District =

Historic district in South Carolina, United States

- U.S. National Register of Historic Places
- U.S. Historic district
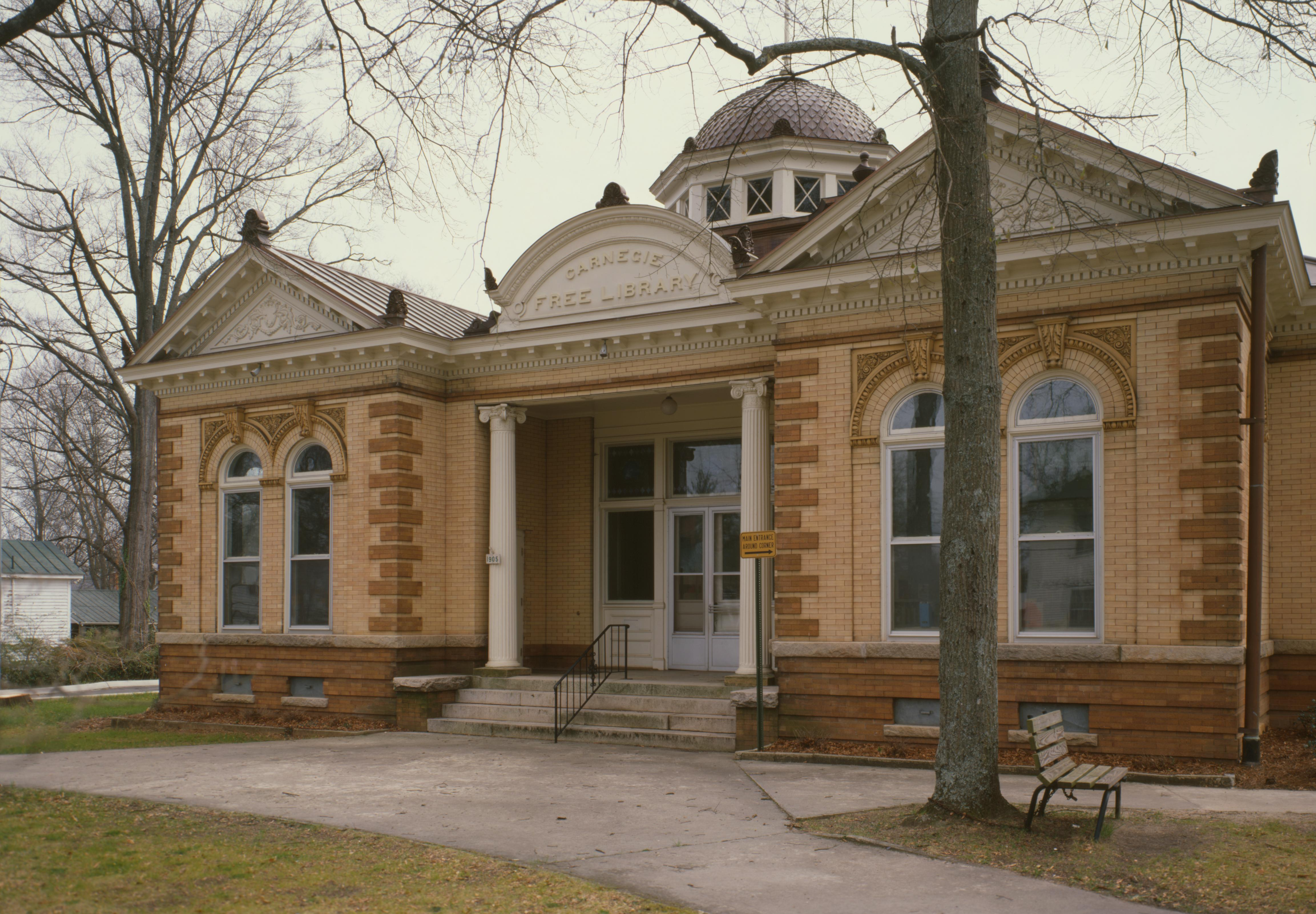
- Carnegie Free Library, HABS Photo, November 1987

- Location within South Carolina Location within the United States
- Location: Roughly South St. between Church & Boyce Sts., Union, South Carolina
- Coordinates: 34°42′42″N 81°37′29″W
- Area: 58.2 acres (23.6 ha)
- Architectural style: Queen Anne, Tudor Revival, Gothic Revival
- MPS: Union MPS
- NRHP reference No.: 83002211, 89000798 (Boundary Increase)
- Added to NRHP: May 19, 1983, July 17, 1989 (Boundary Increase)

South Street–South Church Street Historic District is a national historic district located at Union, Union County, South Carolina. The district encompasses 78 contributing buildings in a primarily residential section of Union. The houses were built between about 1850 to about 1930, with the majority dating from about 1850 to about 1915. The district includes many large-frame Queen Anne inspired houses built about 1880–1910. Also in the district are Neo-Classical, Gothic Revival, Colonial Revival, Tudor Revival, American Foursquare, and Bungalow style dwellings. The district includes the first Carnegie Library established in South Carolina.

It was added to the National Register of Historic Places in 1983, with a boundary increase in 1989.
