= Main Street Grammar School =

- Union High School-Main Street Grammar School
- U.S. National Register of Historic Places
- U.S. Historic district – Contributing property
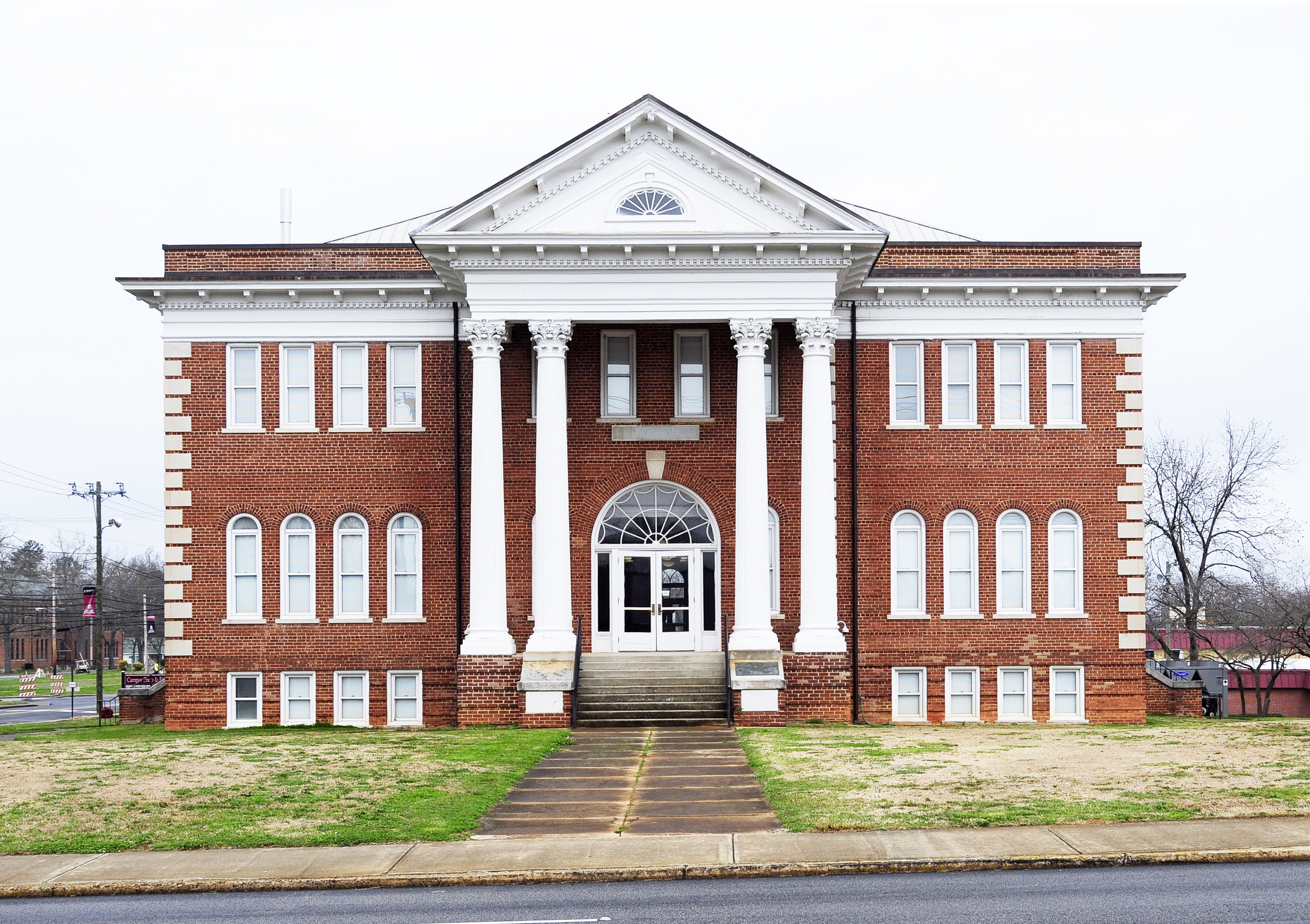
- Union High School-Main Street Grammar School, March 2012

- Location within South Carolina Location within the United States
- Location: 401 E. Main St., Union, South Carolina
- Coordinates: 34.7160°N 81.6197°W
- Area: 1.5 acres (0.61 ha)
- Architect: J.S. Starr
- Architectural style: Classical Revival
- MPS: Union MPS
- NRHP reference No.: 89000797
- Added to NRHP: July 20, 1989

Main Street Grammar School, also known as Union High School, is a historic school building located at Union, Union County, South Carolina. It was built in 1909 and is a two-story, brick Neo-Classical building. It features a brick parapet, central projecting bay and large pedimented portico. In 1965, the Union Campus of the University of South Carolina acquired the building and rehabilitated it to serve as its main campus building.

It was added to the National Register of Historic Places in 1989. It is located in the East Main Street-Douglass Heights Historic District.
