= East Main Street–Douglass Heights Historic District =

Historic district in South Carolina, United States

- U.S. National Register of Historic Places
- U.S. Historic district
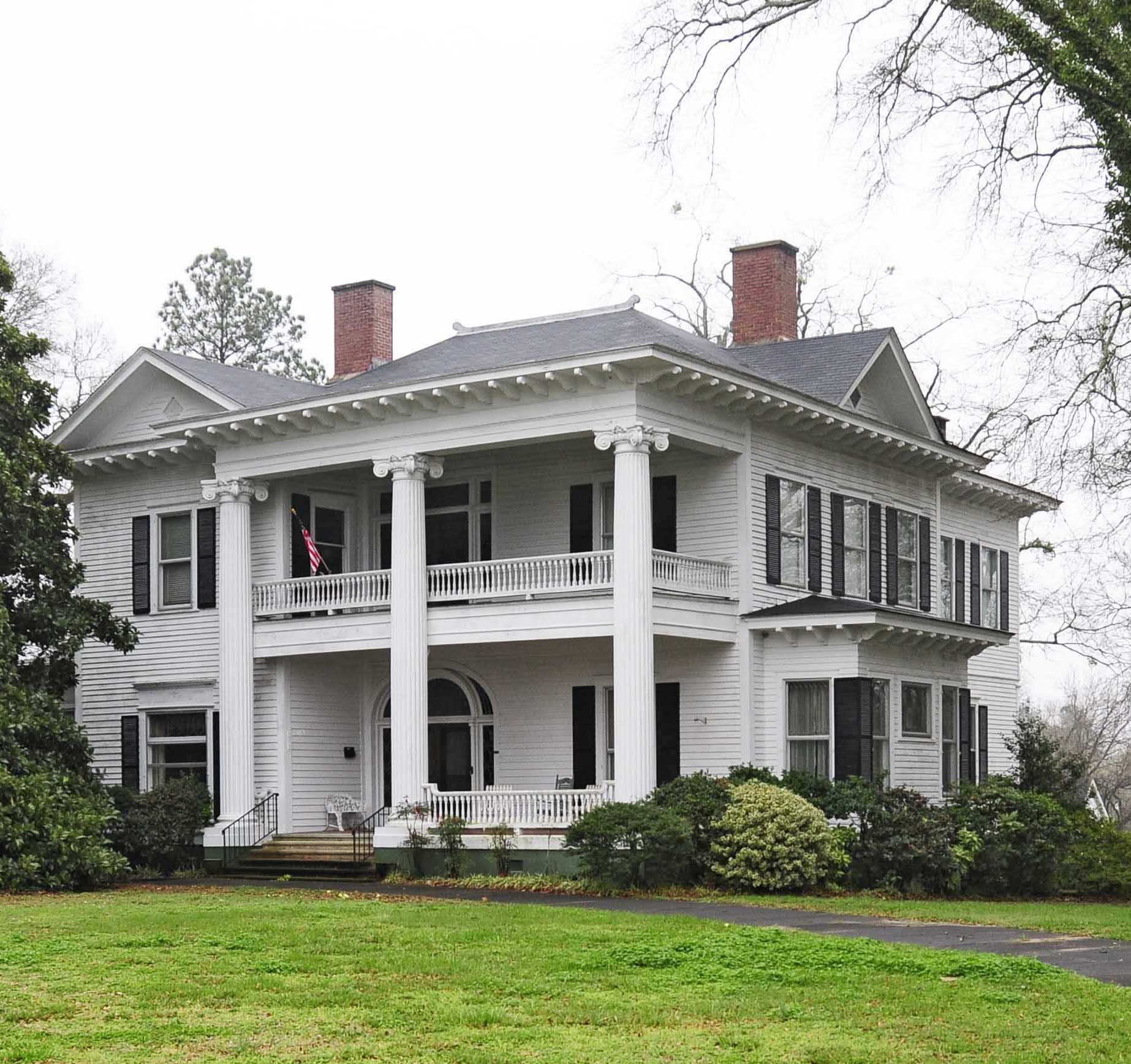
- Steadman–Nicholson House, East Main Street–Douglas Heights Historic District, March 2012

- Location within South Carolina Location within the United States
- Location: Roughly bounded by Perrin Ave., S. Church St., and E. Main St., and 100--121 Douglass Heights, Union, South Carolina
- Coordinates: 34°42′57″N 81°36′58″W
- Area: 537.1 acres (217.4 ha)
- Architectural style: Late 19th And 20th Century Revivals, Late Victorian
- MPS: Union MPS
- NRHP reference No.: 89000796
- Added to NRHP: July 17, 1989

East Main Street–Douglass Heights Historic District is a national historic district located at Union, Union County, South Carolina. The district encompasses 55 contributing buildings in a primarily residential section of Union. The houses were built between about 1823 to 1940, and are in a variety of popular architectural styles include Neo-Classical, Queen Anne, and Colonial Revival. Notable dwellings include the Steadman-Nicholson House, Laurens G. Young House, and William H. Wallace House. Located in the district is the separately listed Union High School-Main Street Grammar School.

It was added to the National Register of Historic Places in 1989.
