= Cedar Bluff (Union, South Carolina) =

Historic house in South Carolina, United States

- U.S. National Register of Historic Places
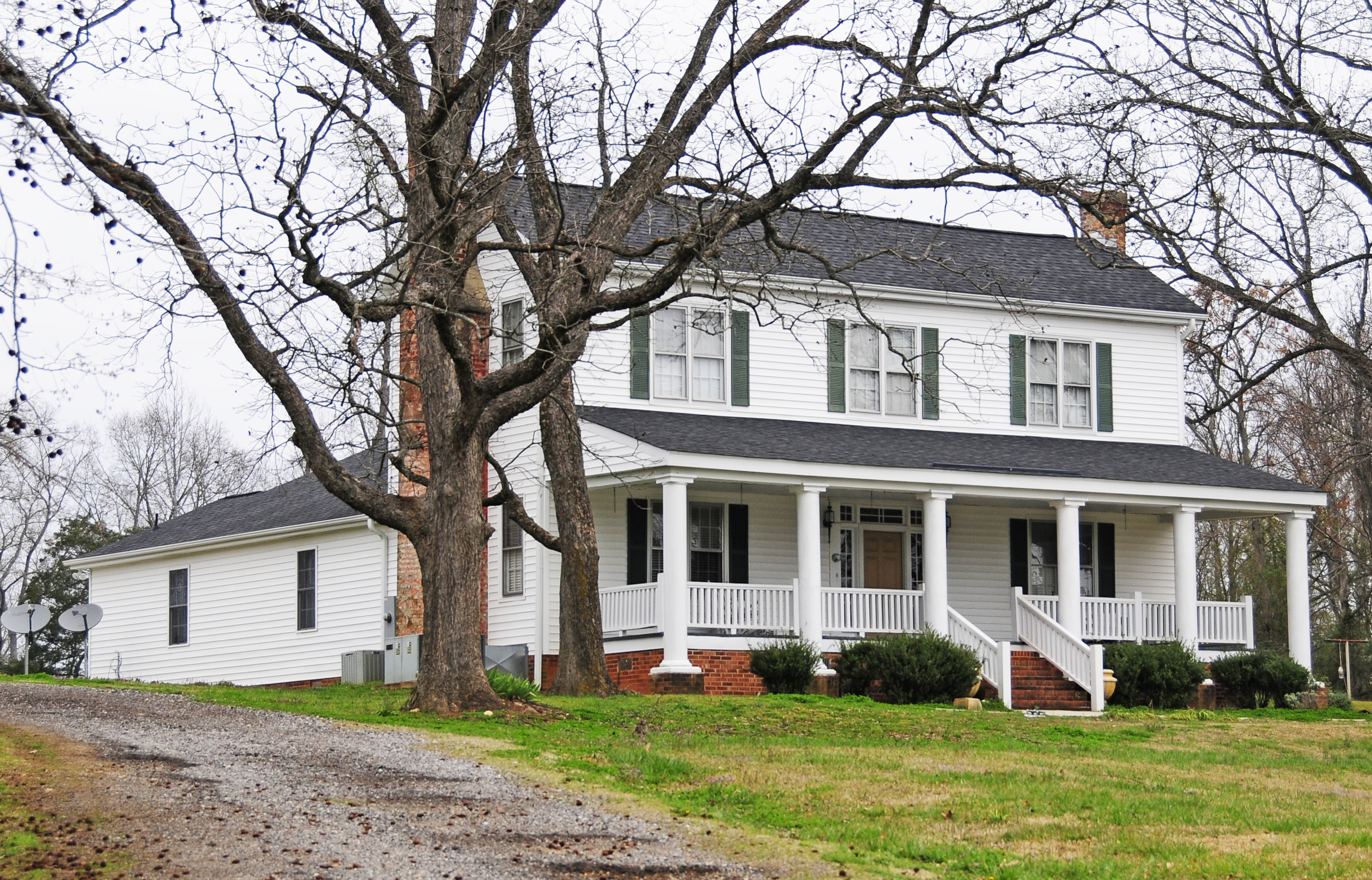
- Cedar Bluff, March 2012

- Location within South Carolina Location within the United States
- Location: South Carolina Highway 49, near Union, South Carolina
- Coordinates: 34°39′47″N 81°44′34″W
- Area: 4 acres (1.6 ha)
- Built: c. 1790
- Built by: Murphy, Byrd
- NRHP reference No.: 74001886
- Added to NRHP: July 20, 1974

Cedar Bluff, also known as the Byrd Murphy House, is a historic home located near Union, Union County, South Carolina. It was built about 1790, and is a small, two-story, timber frame I-house. It features a one-story shed porch supported by square plank columns. A rear wing was added to the house after 1900.

It was added to the National Register of Historic Places in 1974.
