= Union County Jail (Union, South Carolina) =

- U.S. National Register of Historic Places
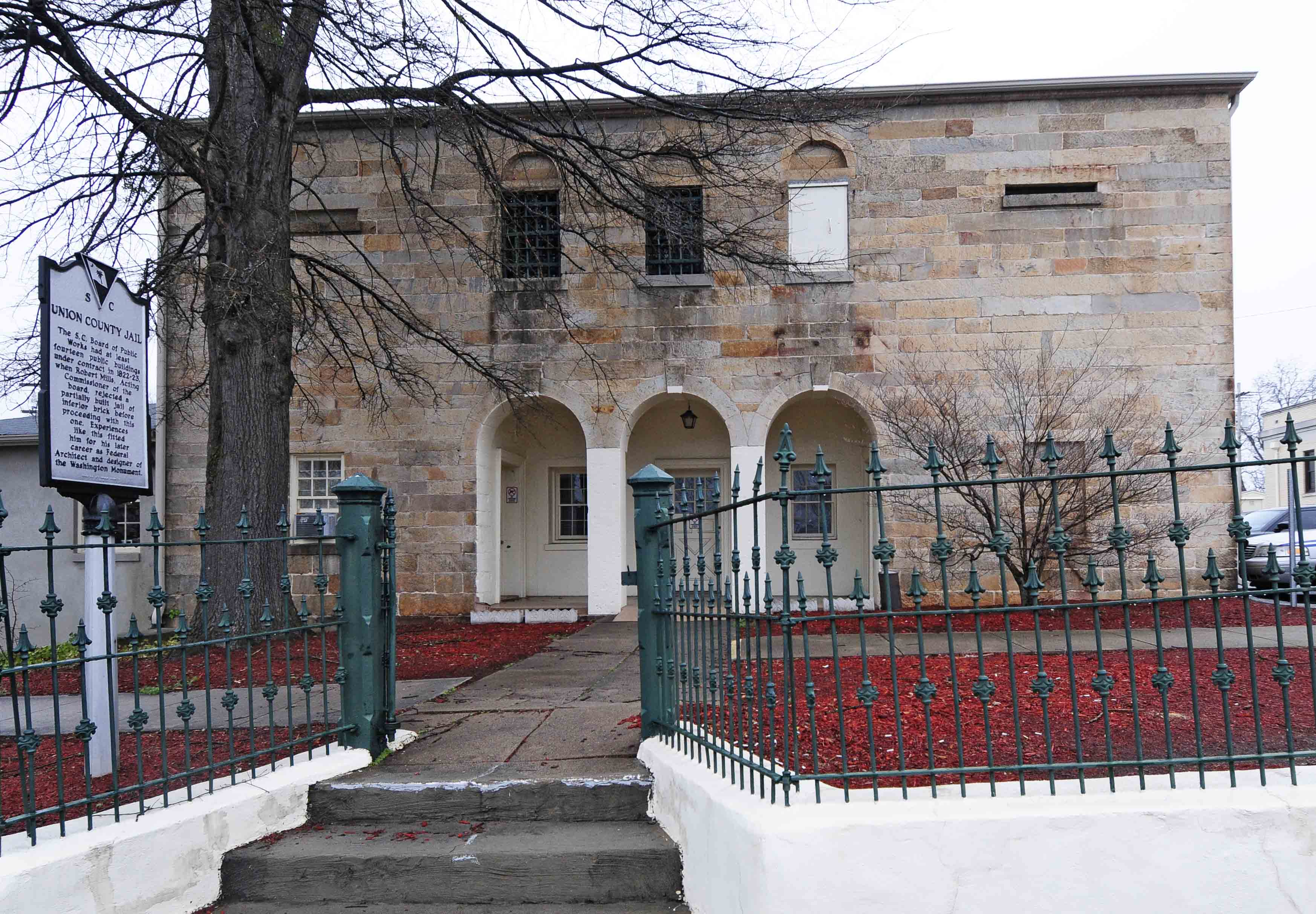
- Union County Jail, March 2012

- Location within South Carolina Location within the United States
- Location: Main St., Union, South Carolina
- Coordinates: 34°42′55″N 81°37′38″W
- Area: less than one acre
- Built: 1823
- Architect: Mills, Robert
- NRHP reference No.: 74001884
- Added to NRHP: August 30, 1974

Union County Jail is a historic jail building located at Union, Union County, South Carolina. It is attributed to Robert Mills and built in 1823. It is a two-story, Palladian style granite ashlar structure. The structure has had two additions since 1900 and the interior has undergone extensive alteration.

It was added to the National Register of Historic Places in 1974.
