= Corinth Baptist Church =

Historic church in South Carolina, United States

- U.S. National Register of Historic Places
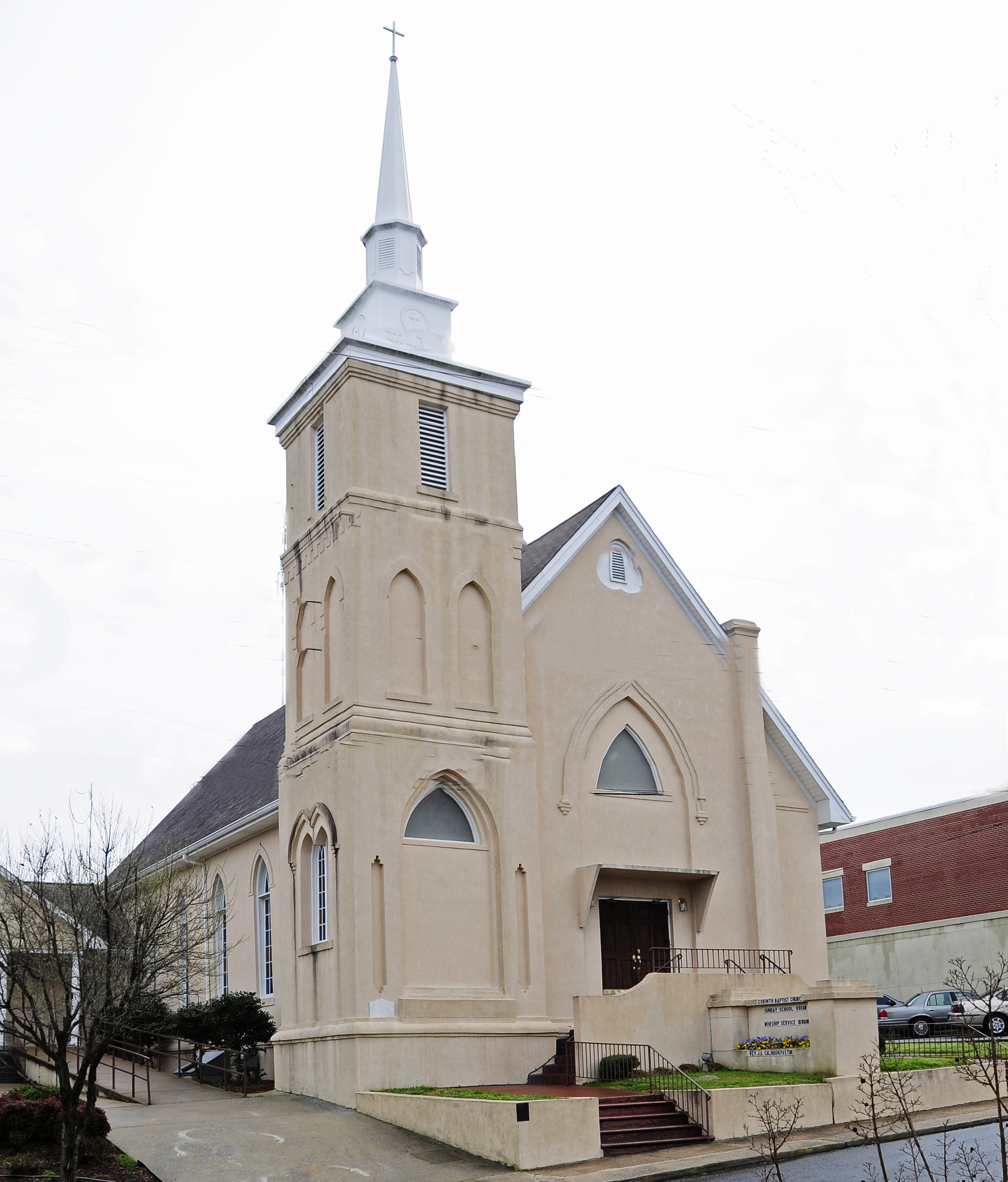

- Location within South Carolina Location within the United States
- Location: N. Herndon St., Union, South Carolina
- Coordinates: 34°42′59″N 81°37′30″W
- Area: less than one acre
- Built: 1893-1894
- Architectural style: Late Gothic Revival
- MPS: Union MPS
- NRHP reference No.: 89000939
- Added to NRHP: July 20, 1989

Corinth Baptist Church is a historic African-American Baptist church located on N. Herndon Street in Union, Union County, South Carolina. It was built in 1893–1894, and is a brick Late Gothic Revival-style church.

It was added to the National Register of Historic Places in 1989.
