= Gov. Thomas B. Jeter House =

Historic house in South Carolina, United States

- U.S. National Register of Historic Places
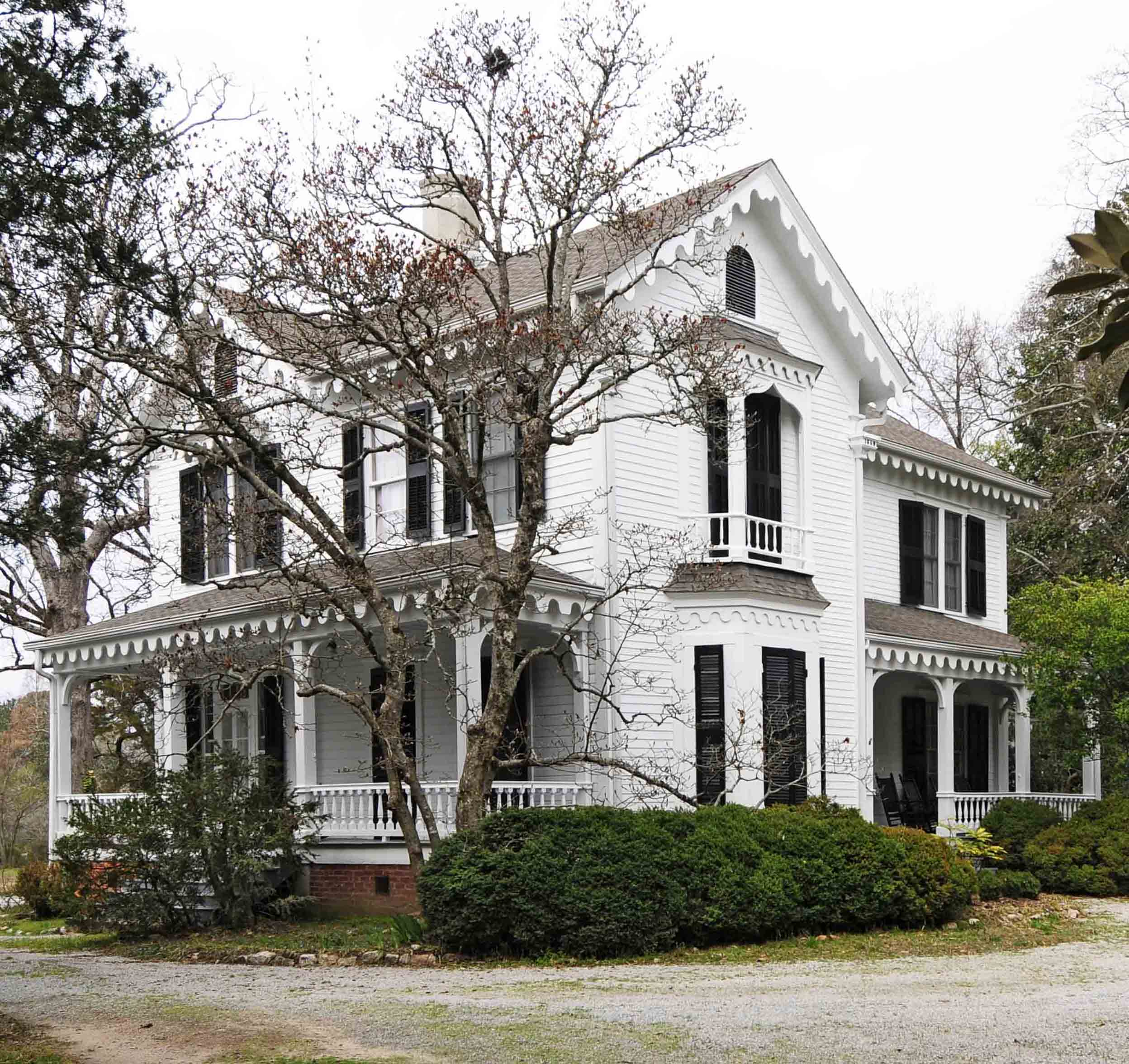
- Governor Thomas B Jeter House, March 2012

- Location within South Carolina Location within the United States
- Location: 203 Thompson Blvd., Union, South Carolina
- Coordinates: 34°43′18″N 81°37′38″W
- Area: 2 acres (0.81 ha)
- Built: 1859
- NRHP reference No.: 74001882
- Added to NRHP: December 2, 1974

Gov. Thomas B. Jeter House, also known as Sarratt House, is a historic home located at Union, Union County, South Carolina. It was built in 1859, and is a two-story, clapboard dwelling with Victorian detailing. It features a one-story front verandah and scalloped trim. It was the home of Thomas Bothwell Jeter, who served as the 79th Governor of South Carolina from September 1, 1880, to November 30, 1880.

It was added to the National Register of Historic Places in 1974.
