= Clinton Chapel African Methodist Episcopal Zion Church =

Historic church in South Carolina, United States

- U.S. National Register of Historic Places
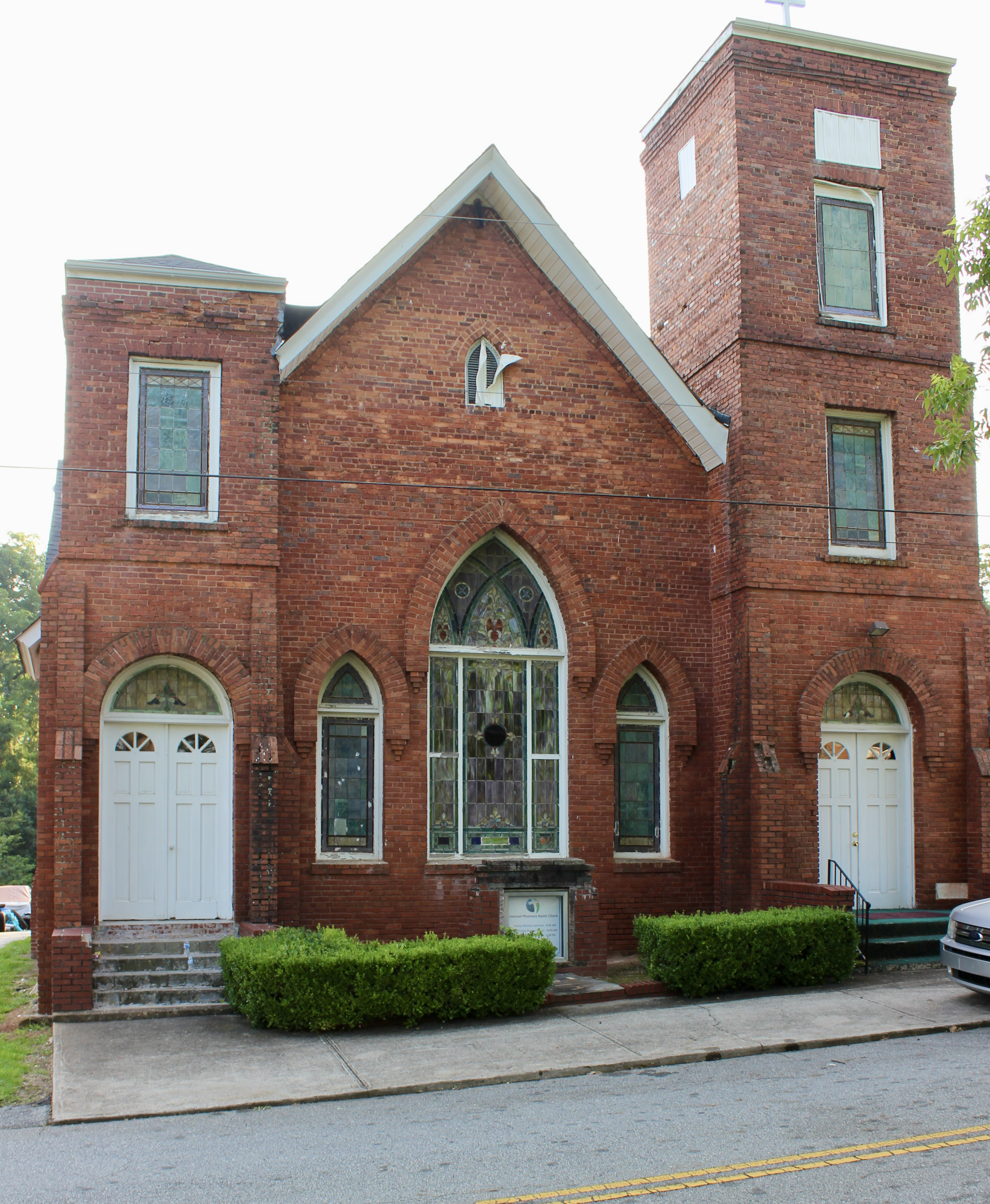

- Location within South Carolina Location within the United States
- Location: 108 South Enterprise Street, Union, South Carolina
- Coordinates: 34°42′51″N 81°37′34″W
- Area: less than one acre
- Built: 1893-1894
- Architectural style: Late Gothic Revival
- MPS: Union MPS
- NRHP reference No.: 100005047
- Added to NRHP: March 12, 2020

Clinton Chapel African Methodist Episcopal Zion Church (also known as Clinton Chapel AME Zion Church) is a historic African Methodist Episcopal church located at Union, South Carolina.

== History ==
Clinton Chapel was built in 1893 and expanded in 1948 during a period of growth for the African Methodist Episcopal Zion Church and the consolidation of Jim Crow segregation.

Added to the National Register of Historic Places on March 12, 2020.
