= Episcopal Church of the Nativity (Union, South Carolina) =

Historic church in South Carolina, United States

- U.S. National Register of Historic Places
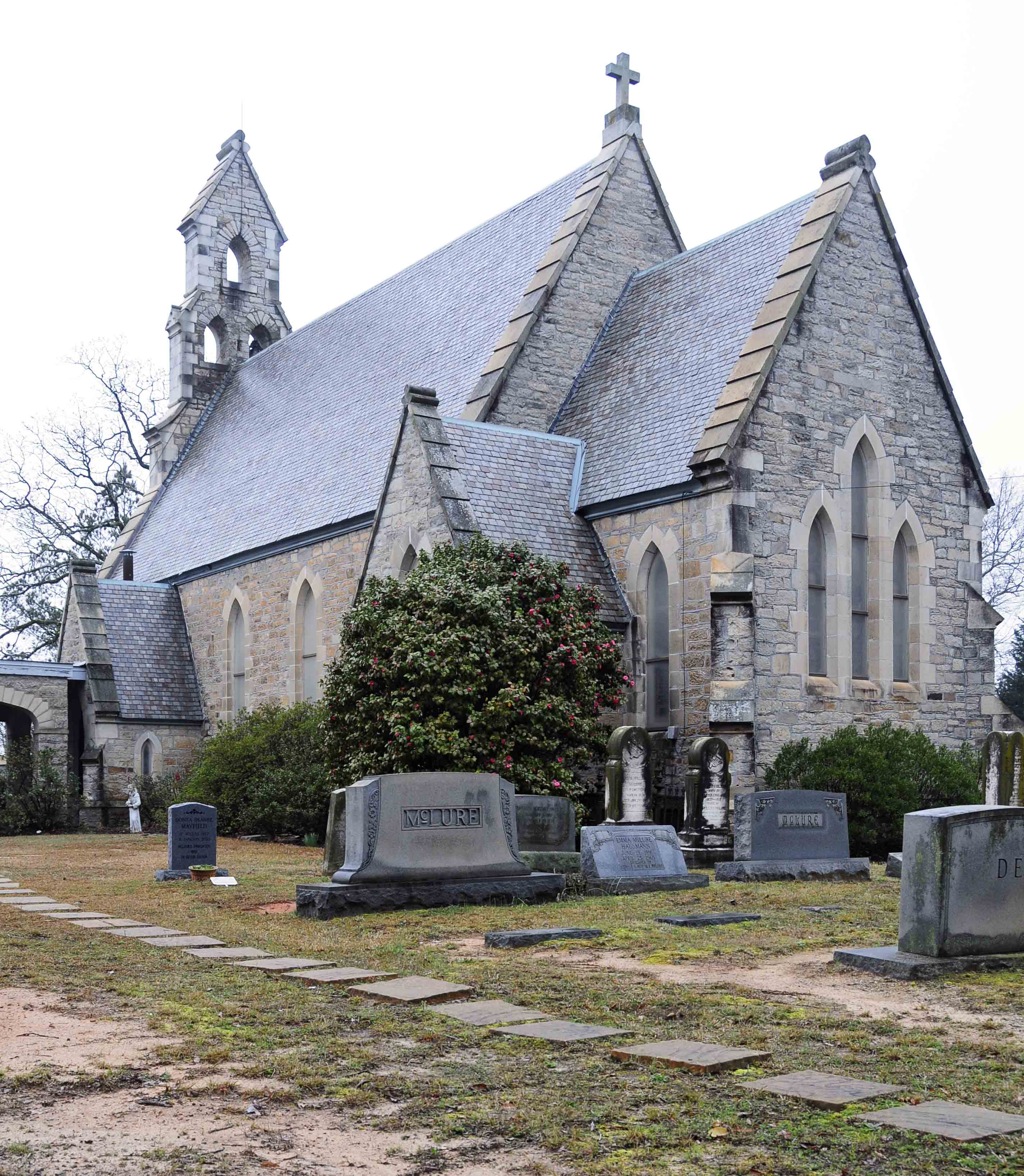

- Location within South Carolina Location within the United States
- Location: Church and Pinckney Sts., Union, South Carolina
- Coordinates: 34°42′31″N 81°37′14″W
- Area: 2 acres (0.81 ha)
- Built: 1855
- Architectural style: Gothic Church
- NRHP reference No.: 74001881
- Added to NRHP: August 30, 1974

Episcopal Church of the Nativity is a historic Episcopal church located at Church and Pinckney Streets in Union, Union County, South Carolina. Construction was started in 1855, but was interrupted by the American Civil War and completed shortly thereafter. The building is a stone Gothic Revival-style church and features a Tiffany stained glass chancel triplet window. Hiram Powers, an American sculptor, carved the octagonal white Carrara marble font that stands in the nave of the church.

It was added to the National Register of Historic Places in 1974.
