= Cross Keys House =

Historic house in South Carolina, United States

- U.S. National Register of Historic Places
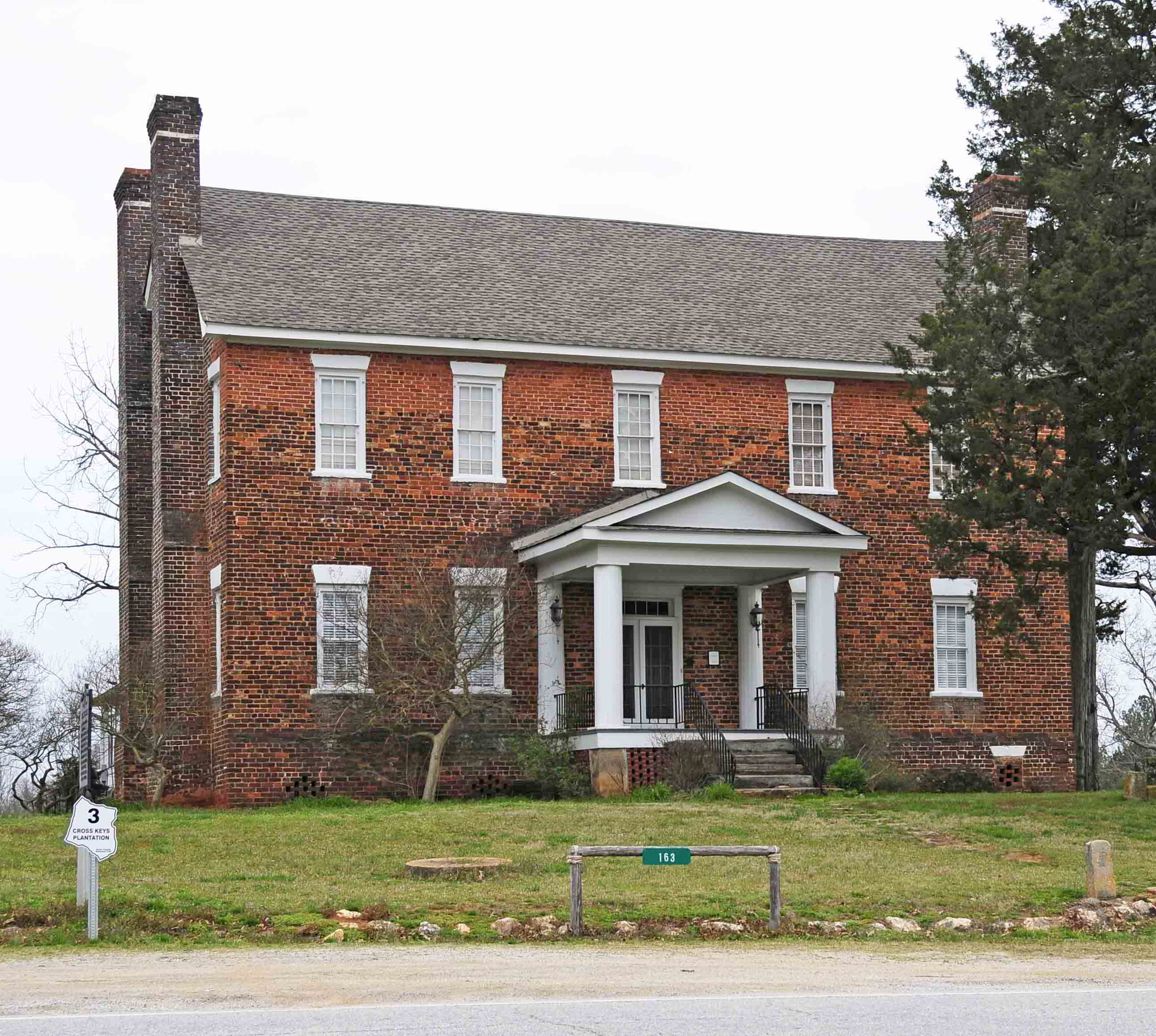
- Cross Keys House, March 2012

- Location within South Carolina Location within the United States
- Location: Southwest of Union on South Carolina Highway 49, Cross Keys, South Carolina
- Coordinates: 34°38′3″N 81°46′27″W
- Area: 5 acres (2.0 ha)
- Built: c. 1812-1814
- Architectural style: Georgian
- NRHP reference No.: 71000811
- Added to NRHP: June 24, 1971

Cross Keys House is a historic plantation house located at Cross Keys, Union County, South Carolina. It was built about 1812–1814, and is a two-story, five-bay, brick Georgian Colonial style dwelling. It features a gabled roof with identical pairs of end chimneys, a massive raised first-story portico, and date stones carved with the date of the house's completion (1814), original owner's initials (B.B.), and crossed keys thought to be the insignia of the builder.

It was added to the National Register of Historic Places in 1971.
