= Fair Forest Hotel =

- U.S. National Register of Historic Places
- U.S. Historic district – Contributing property
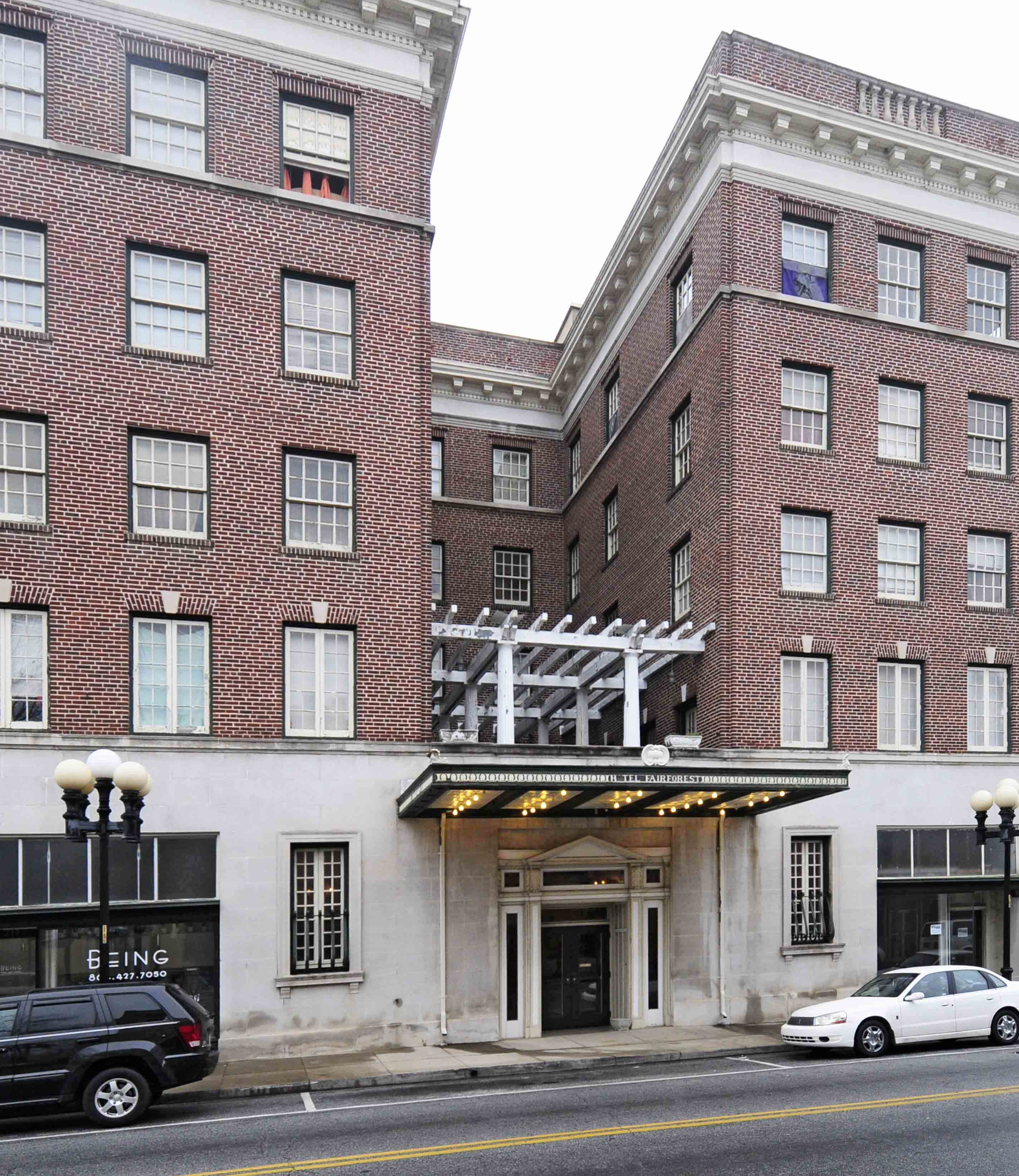
- Fair Forest Hotel, March 2012

- Location within South Carolina Location within the United States
- Location: 221 E. Main St., Union, South Carolina
- Coordinates: 34°42′56″N 81°37′18″W
- Area: less than one acre
- Built: 1924-1926
- Built by: King Lumber Co.
- Architect: Jones, H. Olin
- NRHP reference No.: 84000346
- Added to NRHP: November 1, 1984

Fair Forest Hotel is a historic hotel building located in Union, South Carolina. It was built from 1924 to 1926, and it is a five-story steel and concrete building faced with brick and limestone in the Neo-Classical style. The building has a one-story base, a three-story shaft section, and a one-story capital with a Corinthian order cornice.

It was added to the National Register of Historic Places in 1984. It is located in the Union Downtown Historic District.
