= Union, South Carolina =

- City
- Seal

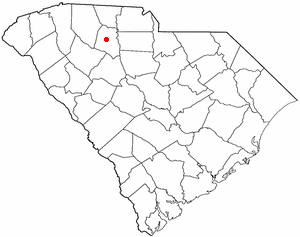
- Location of Union, South Carolina
- Coordinates: 34°44′20″N 81°37′30″W
- Country: United States
- State: South Carolina
- County: Union

Area
  - Total: 7.98 sq mi (20.67 km^{2})
  - Land: 7.98 sq mi (20.67 km^{2})
  - Water: 0 sq mi (0.00 km^{2})
- Elevation: 630 ft (190 m)

Population (2020)
  - Total: 8,174
  - Density: 1,024.4/sq mi (395.54/km^{2})
- Time zone: UTC−5 (Eastern (EST))
  - Summer (DST): UTC−4 (EDT)
- ZIP code: 29379
- Area codes: 864, 821
- FIPS code: 45-73105
- GNIS feature ID: 2405625
- Website: http://www.cityofunion.net/

The city of Union is the county seat of Union County, South Carolina, United States. As of the 2020 census, Union had a population of 8,174. It is the principal city of the Union Micropolitan Statistical Area, which includes all of Union County and which is further included in the greater Greenville-Spartanburg-Anderson, South Carolina Combined Statistical Area.

== History ==
Both the city of Union and Union County received their names from the old Union Church that stood a short distance from the Monarch Mill. When it was first founded, the city of Union was known as Unionville; later the name was shortened to Union. The county's first white settlers came from Virginia in 1749. Union County's population grew the fastest between 1762 and the start of the Revolutionary War. Settlers built log cabins and cultivated tobacco, flax, corn and wheat. Union was one of the first towns settled in the area and was untouched during the Civil War because the Broad River flooded and turned Sherman’s troops away from the town.

== Geography ==
According to the United States Census Bureau, the city has a total area of 8.08 square miles (20.9 km^{2}), all of it land.

== Climate ==
According to the Köppen Climate Classification system, Union has a humid subtropical climate, abbreviated "Cfa" on climate maps. The hottest temperature recorded in Union was 110 °F (43.3 °C) on September 4, 1925 and July 1, 2012, while the coldest temperature recorded was −11 °F (−23.9 °C) on February 14, 1899.

Climate data for Santuck, South Carolina, 1991–2020 normals, extremes 1895–present
Month	Jan	Feb	Mar	Apr	May	Jun	Jul	Aug	Sep	Oct	Nov	Dec	Year
Record high °F (°C)	81 (27)	83 (28)	92 (33)	97 (36)	106 (41)	107 (42)	110 (43)	108 (42)	110 (43)	100 (38)	92 (33)	85 (29)	110 (43)
Mean maximum °F (°C)	71.0 (21.7)	73.9 (23.3)	82.0 (27.8)	87.1 (30.6)	92.4 (33.6)	97.2 (36.2)	99.2 (37.3)	98.3 (36.8)	92.9 (33.8)	84.9 (29.4)	77.1 (25.1)	72.5 (22.5)	100.3 (37.9)
Mean daily maximum °F (°C)	54.7 (12.6)	59.1 (15.1)	67.0 (19.4)	75.6 (24.2)	82.6 (28.1)	89.1 (31.7)	92.3 (33.5)	90.0 (32.2)	83.3 (28.5)	73.5 (23.1)	63.5 (17.5)	56.4 (13.6)	73.9 (23.3)
Daily mean °F (°C)	43.0 (6.1)	46.6 (8.1)	53.5 (11.9)	61.9 (16.6)	69.6 (20.9)	76.8 (24.9)	80.1 (26.7)	78.4 (25.8)	72.1 (22.3)	61.5 (16.4)	51.3 (10.7)	45.0 (7.2)	61.7 (16.5)
Mean daily minimum °F (°C)	31.3 (−0.4)	34.0 (1.1)	40.0 (4.4)	48.2 (9.0)	56.7 (13.7)	64.4 (18.0)	68.0 (20.0)	66.9 (19.4)	61.0 (16.1)	49.6 (9.8)	39.0 (3.9)	33.7 (0.9)	49.4 (9.7)
Mean minimum °F (°C)	14.4 (−9.8)	19.0 (−7.2)	23.3 (−4.8)	32.8 (0.4)	43.4 (6.3)	55.6 (13.1)	62.3 (16.8)	60.4 (15.8)	49.5 (9.7)	34.3 (1.3)	24.4 (−4.2)	19.9 (−6.7)	12.6 (−10.8)
Record low °F (°C)	−4 (−20)	−11 (−24)	7 (−14)	23 (−5)	32 (0)	42 (6)	48 (9)	48 (9)	36 (2)	24 (−4)	12 (−11)	−1 (−18)	−11 (−24)
Average precipitation inches (mm)	3.88 (99)	3.55 (90)	4.18 (106)	3.42 (87)	3.26 (83)	3.97 (101)	3.13 (80)	4.31 (109)	4.04 (103)	3.28 (83)	3.54 (90)	4.02 (102)	44.58 (1,133)
Average snowfall inches (cm)	1.4 (3.6)	0.8 (2.0)	0.4 (1.0)	0.0 (0.0)	0.0 (0.0)	0.0 (0.0)	0.0 (0.0)	0.0 (0.0)	0.0 (0.0)	0.0 (0.0)	0.0 (0.0)	0.3 (0.76)	2.9 (7.36)
Average precipitation days (≥ 0.01 in)	9.9	9.4	10.6	9.1	9.5	10.9	10.1	9.5	8.0	6.8	8.0	9.8	111.6
Average snowy days (≥ 0.1 in)	1.0	0.5	0.3	0.0	0.0	0.0	0.0	0.0	0.0	0.0	0.0	0.4	2.2
Source 1: NOAA
Source 2: National Weather Service

== Demographics ==
Historical population
Census	Pop.	Note	%±
1850	554		—
1880	1,267		—
1890	1,609		27.0%
1900	5,400		235.6%
1910	5,623		4.1%
1920	6,141		9.2%
1930	7,419		20.8%
1940	8,478		14.3%
1950	9,730		14.8%
1960	10,191		4.7%
1970	10,775		5.7%
1980	10,523		−2.3%
1990	9,836		−6.5%
2000	8,793		−10.6%
2010	8,393		−4.5%
2020	8,174		−2.6%
U.S. Decennial Census; 2013 Estimate

Union first appeared in the 1850 U.S. Census as "Unionville", with a recorded total population of 554.

=== Racial and ethnic composition ===
Union city, South Carolina – Racial and ethnic composition Note: the US Census treats Hispanic/Latino as an ethnic category. This table excludes Latinos from the racial categories and assigns them to a separate category. Hispanics/Latinos may be of any race.
Race / Ethnicity (NH = Non-Hispanic)	Pop 2000	Pop 2010	Pop 2020	% 2000	% 2010	% 2020
White alone (NH)	4,933	4,200	3,660	56.10%	50.04%	44.78%
Black or African American alone (NH)	3,686	3,924	4,023	41.92%	46.75%	49.22%
Native American or Alaska Native alone (NH)	21	22	10	0.24%	0.26%	0.12%
Asian alone (NH)	33	36	34	0.38%	0.43%	0.42%
Native Hawaiian or Pacific Islander alone (NH)	1	0	0	0.01%	0.00%	0.00%
Other race alone (NH)	0	11	22	0.00%	0.13%	0.27%
Mixed race or Multiracial (NH)	59	101	284	0.67%	1.20%	3.47%
Hispanic or Latino (any race)	60	99	141	0.68%	1.18%	1.72%
Total	8,793	8,393	8,174	100.00%	100.00%	100.00%

=== 2020 census ===
As of the 2020 census, Union had a population of 8,174, a median age of 42.0 years, 24.0% of residents under the age of 18, 20.5% of residents age 65 or older, 81.9 males per 100 females overall, and 77.4 males per 100 females age 18 and over.

97.7% of residents lived in urban areas, while 2.3% lived in rural areas.

There were 3,568 households in Union, of which 29.7% had children under the age of 18 living in them, 27.9% were married-couple households, 20.5% were households with a male householder and no spouse or partner present, and 45.6% were households with a female householder and no spouse or partner present. About 37.3% of all households were made up of individuals and 16.9% had someone living alone who was 65 years of age or older.

There were 4,192 housing units, of which 14.9% were vacant; the homeowner vacancy rate was 3.3% and the rental vacancy rate was 8.2%.

Racial composition as of the 2020 census
Race	Number	Percent
White	3,702	45.3%
Black or African American	4,052	49.6%
American Indian and Alaska Native	10	0.1%
Asian	34	0.4%
Native Hawaiian and Other Pacific Islander	1	0.0%
Some other race	51	0.6%
Two or more races	324	4.0%

=== 2000 census ===
As of the census of 2000, there were 8,793 people, 3,791 households, and 2,399 families residing in the city. The population density was 1,105.0 inhabitants per square mile (426.6/km^{2}). There were 4,240 housing units at an average density of 532.9 per square mile (205.8/km^{2}). The racial makeup of the city was 56.48% White, 42.12% African American, 0.24% Native American, 0.38% Asian, 0.01% Pacific Islander, 0.05% from other races, and 0.73% from two or more races. Hispanic or Latino of any race were 0.68% of the population.

There were 3,791 households, out of which 25.5% had children under the age of 18 living with them, 38.5% were married couples living together, 21.3% had a female householder with no husband present, and 36.7% were non-families. 33.7% of all households were made up of individuals, and 16.5% had someone living alone who was 65 years of age or older. The average household size was 2.28 and the average family size was 2.91.

In the city, the population was spread out, with 22.9% under the age of 18, 8.3% from 18 to 24, 25.6% from 25 to 44, 23.1% from 45 to 64, and 20.0% who were 65 years of age or older. The median age was 40 years. For every 100 females, there were 79.5 males. For every 100 females age 18 and over, there were 74.3 males.

The median income for a household in the city was $26,110, and the median income for a family was $34,714. Males had a median income of $29,071 versus $19,966 for females. The per capita income for the city was $16,175. About 17.6% of families and 20.8% of the population were below the poverty line, including 29.1% of those under age 18 and 15.3% of those age 65 or over.

== Arts and Culture ==
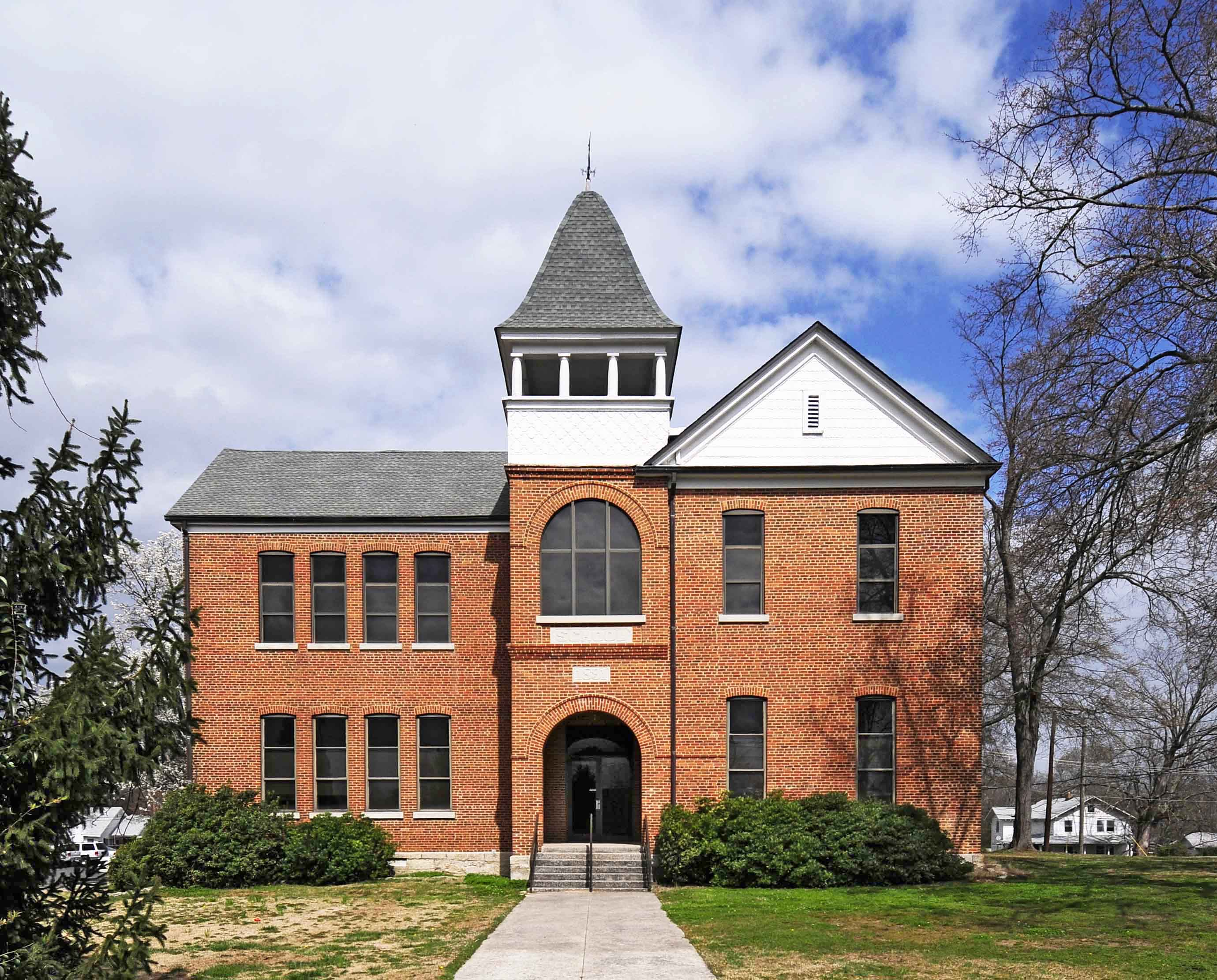
Central Graded School

Sites in Union listed on the National Register of Historic Places webpage for Union County include:

- Cedar Bluff
- Central Graded School
- Corinth Baptist Church
- Culp House
- Judge Thomas Dawkins House
- East Main Street-Douglass Heights Historic District
- Episcopal Church of the Nativity
- Fair Forest Hotel
- Herndon Terrace
- Gov. Thomas B. Jeter House
- Meng House
- Merridun
- South Street-South Church Street Historic District
- Union Community Hospital
- Union County Jail
- Union Downtown Historic District
- Union High School-Main Street Grammar School
- Nathaniel Gist House

== Education ==
Union County Schools operates public schools.

For some time, the county had three high schools, Union Comprehensive High, Jonesville High, and Lockhart High. As of a council ruling, the three high schools have been consolidated. Jonesville High School and Lockhart High School were closed, and the students were reassigned to Union High School, which has been renamed Union County High School.

The city is also home to the University of South Carolina Union (USC Union), a satellite campus of the University of South Carolina. USC Union was founded in 1965 and is accredited by the Southern Association of Colleges and Schools.

Union has a public library, the Union County Carnegie Library. This Carnegie library provides services and resources for both the community and USC Union students. It was named 2009's Best Small Library in America by Library Journal.

== Notable people ==
- Darrell Austin, former NFL player for New York Jets and Tampa Bay Buccaneers
- Lester Oliver Bankhead (1912–1997), American architect, born in Union, South Carolina
- States Rights Gist, Confederate brigadier general during Civil War
- Elizabeth B. Grimball, theatrical producer, director, writer
- Willie Jeffries, legendary College Football Hall of Fame coach for several teams
- Bob Jeter, NFL player for Green Bay Packers and Chicago Bears
- Henry "Rufe" Johnson, a Piedmont blues guitarist, pianist, singer and songwriter
- Mona Lisa, R&B singer
- Cotton Owens, NASCAR driver
- Clifford Ray, former professional basketball player for Golden State Warriors and Chicago Bulls
- Don Rhymer, former film writer and producer
- Jim Youngblood, former NFL linebacker for Los Angeles Rams #53
- Shi Smith, NFL Wide Receiver for Carolina Panthers
- Susan Smith, convicted of murdering her two young sons in 1995.

== See also ==
- Union County, South Carolina
- Spartanburg, South Carolina
- Greenville, South Carolina
