= Union County, South Carolina =

County in South Carolina, United States

- County
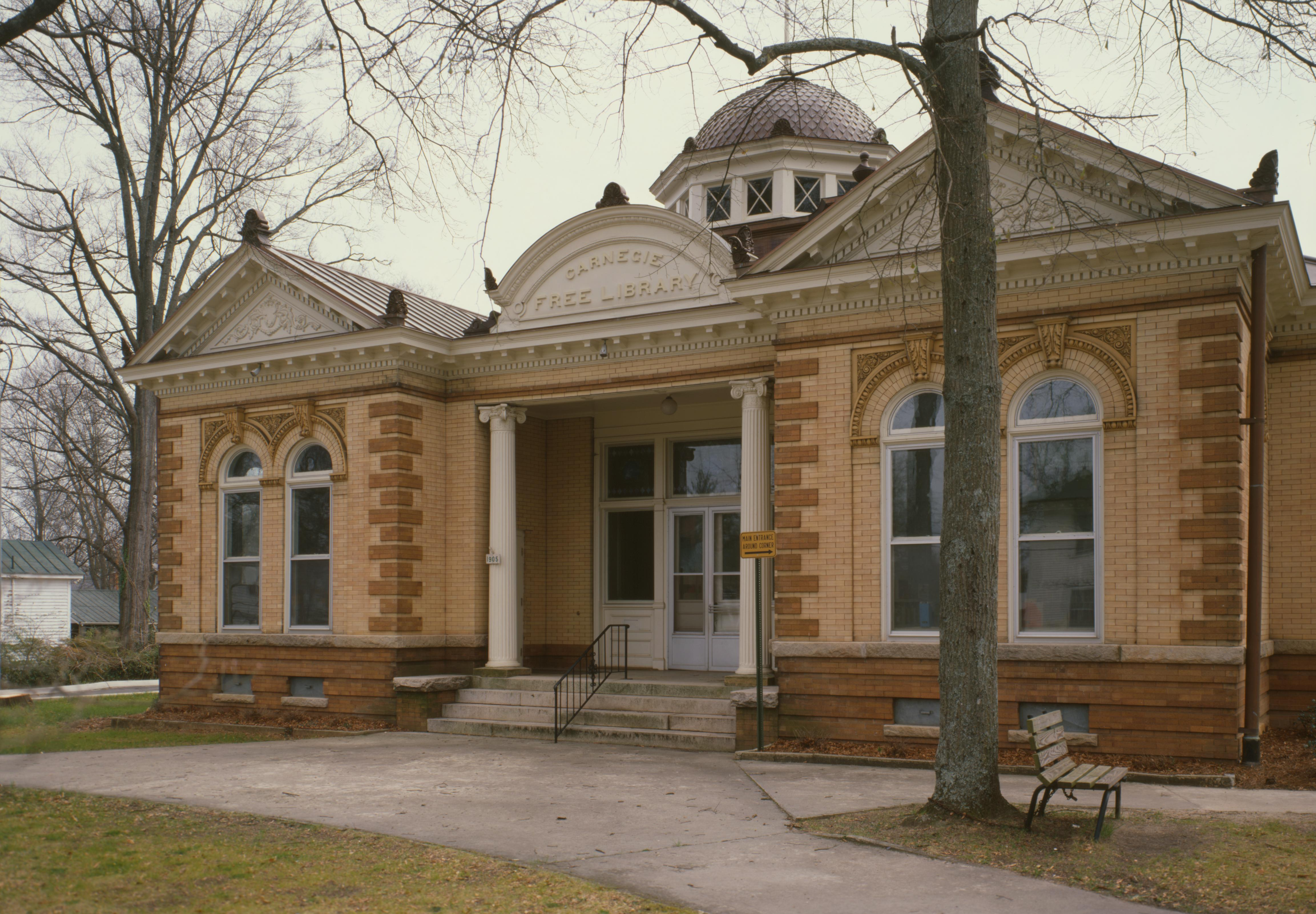
- Union County Carnegie Library

- Seal Logo
- Motto(s): "Gear Up" "A Great Place To Do Business - And Live Life!"
- Location within the U.S. state of South Carolina
- Coordinates: 34.69°N 81.62°W
- Country: United States
- State: South Carolina
- Founded: 1785
- Named for: The old Union Church
- Seat: Union
- Largest community: Union

Area
  - Total: 515.44 sq mi (1,335.0 km^{2})
  - Land: 513.59 sq mi (1,330.2 km^{2})
  - Water: 1.85 sq mi (4.8 km^{2}) 0.36%

Population (2020)
  - Total: 27,244
  - Estimate (2025): 26,799 ▼
  - Density: 53.046/sq mi (20.481/km^{2})
- Time zone: UTC−5 (Eastern)
  - Summer (DST): UTC−4 (EDT)
- Congressional district: 5th
- Website: gearupunionsc.com

Union County is a county located in the U.S. state of South Carolina. As of the 2020 census, the population was 27,244. Its county seat is Union. The county was created in 1785.

Union County is included in the Spartanburg, SC Metropolitan Statistical Area, which is also part of the Greenville-Spartanburg-Anderson, SC Combined Statistical Area.

== History ==
=== Early settlement ===
The area that includes Union County was once controlled by the Cherokee Indians and they used it as a hunting ground. Up until recent years, one could find numerous arrowheads with little effort throughout the county.

The first European settlers in Union County came from the backcountry of Virginia and Pennsylvania; more than three-fourths were Scots-Irish Presbyterians. It has been suggested that the first group of pioneers arrived as early as 1751. They settled in the northwestern section of the county near a small river that would later be named Fairforest Creek. According to tradition, Mr. McElwaine, a member of the party looked out at the thick woodlands and exclaimed, "What a fair forest!" At the time of their arrival, wild buffalo and horses abounded as well as panthers and cougars, which were called "tigers" or "tygers" by the settlers. This may be where the Tyger River got its name. Another group of Scots-Irish settlers arrived in the late 1750s, all of whom were Presbyterians of Scottish descent, they consisted of five married couples and their children from the village of Ballinamallard, four married couples and their children from the village of Kesh and two married couples with their eight parents and their total of eleven children from the village of Caledon in County Tyrone, Ireland in what has since become Northern Ireland.

The early settlers established Fairforest Presbyterian Church, the first house of worship in Union County. Around 1754, the Brown's Creek area was first settled, about four miles northeast of the present city of Union. A log church or meetinghouse was built and shared among several denominations that could not yet afford their own separate structures. The county and county seat were named for this "Union" church. Quakers arrived in the mid-1750s and settled the southern portion of the county, establishing Cane Creek Church in the Santuc community, and Padgett's Creek Church in the Cross Keys community. The Quakers left in the early 1800s because of their opposition to slavery. Baptists from North Carolina, under the leadership of Rev. Philip Mulkey, reached the Broad River in Fairfield County, SC in 1759. They relocated to Union County in 1762 and in 1771 formally organized into the first Baptist church in the South Carolina upcountry known as Fairforest Baptist Church. Many Baptist churches throughout the upcountry are descended from this original congregation. The congregation later moved to a site on present day SC Hwy 18 between Union and Jonesville where it remains to this day.

=== Revolutionary period ===
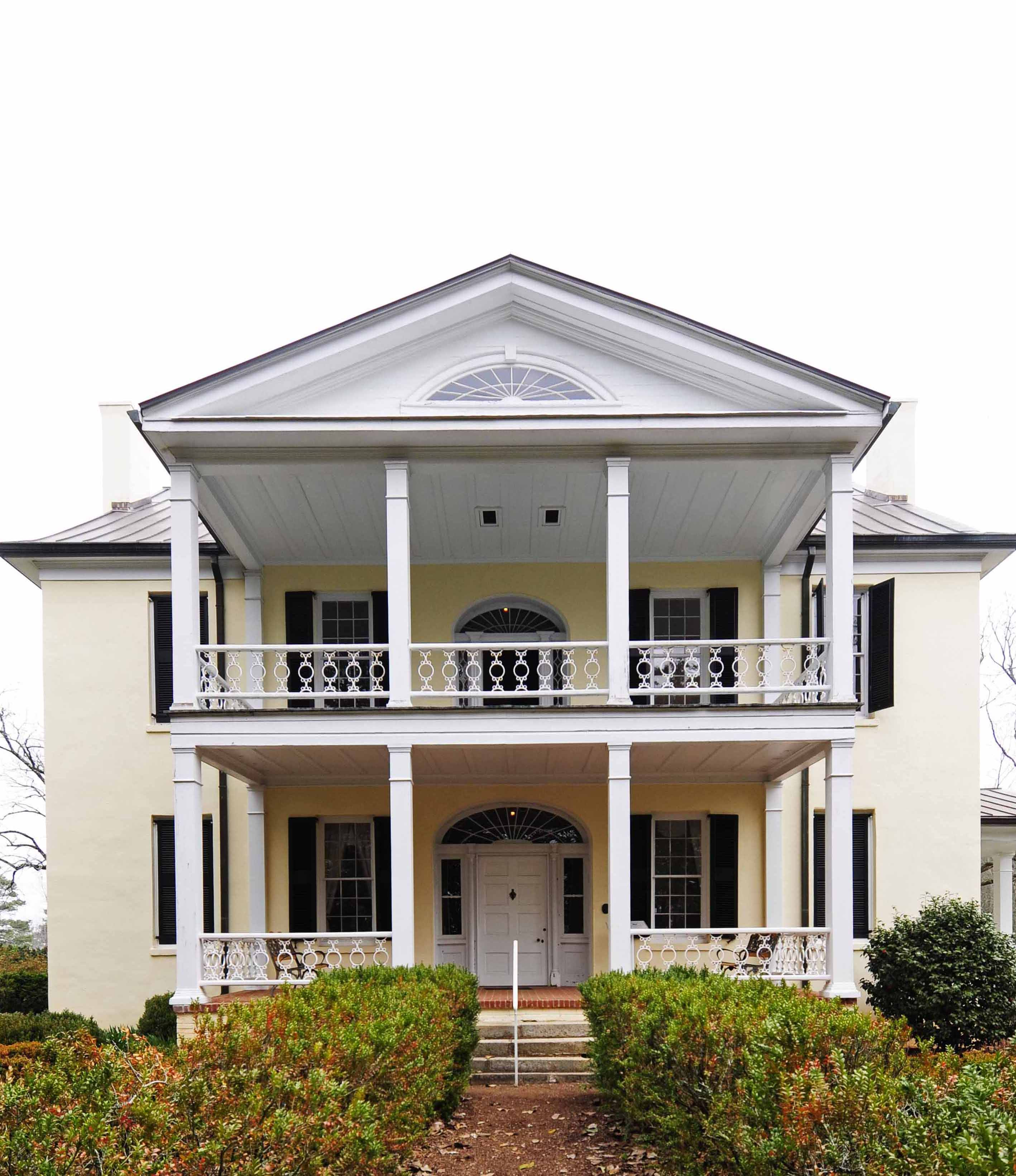
Rose Hill Plantation. The home of South Carolina "Secession Governor" William Henry Gist.

During the first part of the American Revolution, the South Carolina backcountry was fairly quiet. In 1776, Fairforest Church became the hub for Union County. Although divided, it was majority Loyalists. The Fairforest Church became the headquarters for the Loyalists. Following the war the church became Padgetts Creek Baptist Church. Following the fall of Charleston in 1780, the British began focusing their attention on the Carolinas. At least five battles were fought in or near Union County, including Musgrove Mill, Fishdam and Blackstock. The county also produced many notable heroes including Lt. Col. James Steen. The war divided the population between Loyalists and Patriots. This resulted in churches splitting up and settlers moving out of the area. Personal property was damaged by both sides.

Following the war, the county seat was established at Unionville (now Union) and a courthouse was constructed. In 1791, the South Carolina Legislature established a district court that included Spartanburg, Union, Chester, and York counties. The area was called the Pinckney District and its headquarters was established at a central location in Union County. Land was cleared and streets were laid out for a new town that would be called Pinckneyville. A courthouse and jail were built for the new judicial district and a college was to be established in the town.

Local tradition states that Pinckneyville was to be home to the United States Military Academy, but lost to West Point by one vote in Congress. Instead, local historians say that Pinckneyville was considered as the site for a federal arsenal. This was likely the source of the legend. In 1799, the General Assembly decided to restructure the state court system. Subsequently, the Pinckney District was abolished; with the loss of the court and associated businesses, Pinckneyville became a ghost town.

=== Antebellum period ===
During the early 1800s settlers developed large-scale cotton growing in the fertile soil of southern Union County, based on the use of enslaved labor. The demand for slaves in the Deep South drove the domestic market, and more than one million slaves were forcibly transported to the South in the antebellum years. There were numerous plantations in the county, several that are still standing, such as Rose Hill Plantation and the Cross Keys House. Rose Hill was the home of South Carolina's "Secession Governor," William Henry Gist. The northern section of the county was mostly home to yeoman farmers and small scale planters who owned fewer slaves.

The county grew steadily during the antebellum period but remained almost fully agrarian. Stores and other businesses were established in the town of Union and a new courthouse and jail were designed for the town in 1823 by famed architect Robert Mills, designer of the Washington Monument. The courthouse was demolished in 1911, but the jail is still standing and in use by the City of Union. It is located beside the present courthouse, constructed in 1913.

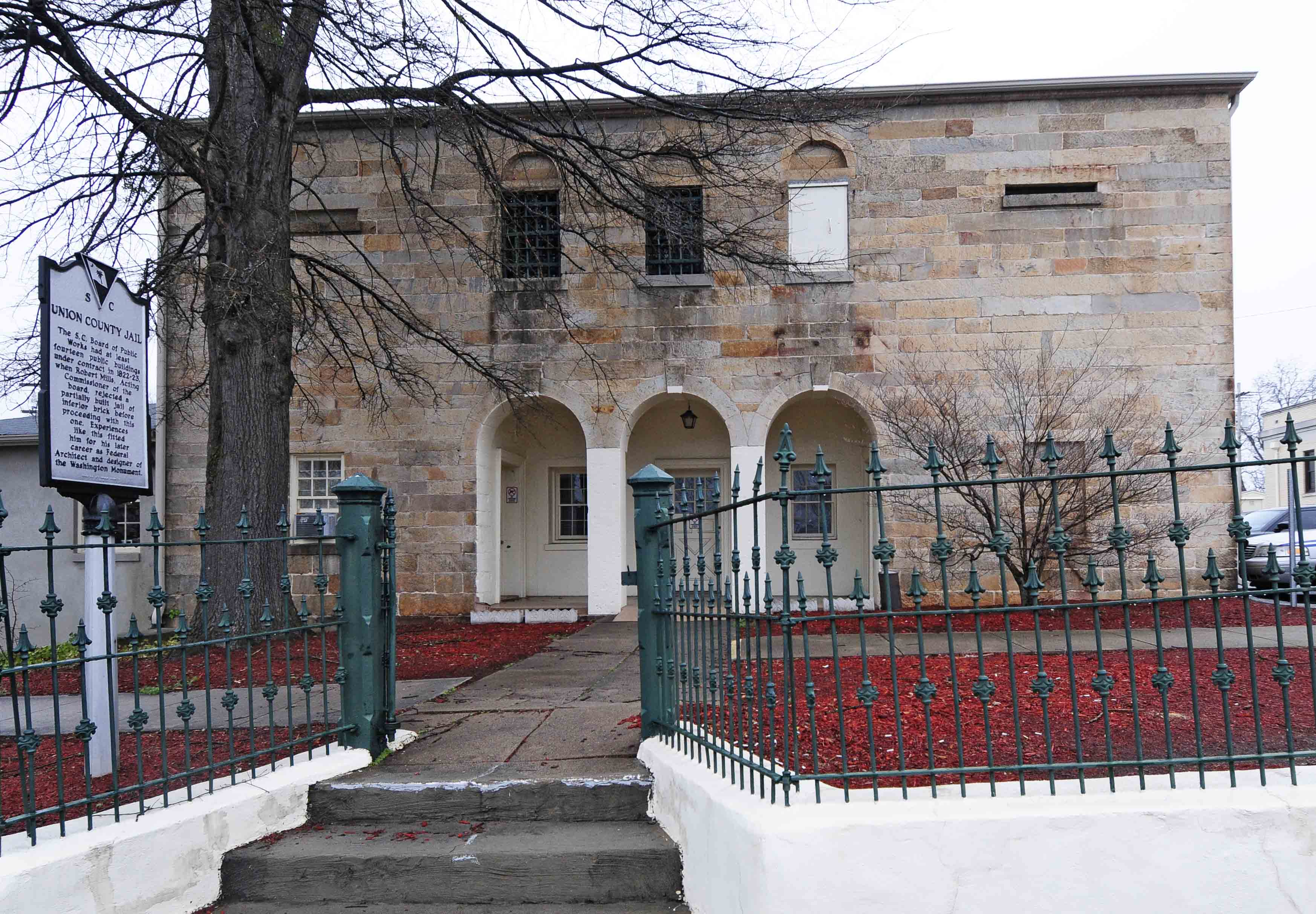
Union County Jail (1823) designed by Robert Mills

=== Civil War and aftermath ===
The Civil War brought a standstill to the county's growth and progress. Many local men rushed to enlist in the Confederate Army and numerous units of Union County soldiers served on battlefields across the South. On April 20, 1861, a strange object appeared in the sky above the Kelly-Kelton community of northeastern Union County. A large hot air balloon called the Enterprise descended to the ground, piloted by Professor T.S.C. Lowe, who had left Cincinnati, Ohio the day before. He had attempted to fly from Ohio to Washington, D.C. but instead was swept southward across Virginia into South Carolina. The locals crowded around this mysterious object, many insisting that Lowe be "shot on the spot," as they believed him to be a Northern spy. Local tradition states that Professor Lowe gave a Masonic distress sign and his life was saved by the Masons in the crowd. Eventually he would make it back to the North and work with the Union Army on aerial reconnaissance projects during the war. At the close of the war, Confederate President Jefferson Davis came through Union County following the fall of Richmond in 1865. He and his entourage crossed the ferry at Pinckneyville and made their way to the town of Union. They dined at the William Wallace house on Et Main Street in Union and the Cross Keys house in southwestern Union County before his eventual capture in Georgia.

Following the war, a system of sharecropping and tenant farming was established to take the place of slavery and provide a consistent labor force. Union County's history parallels the history of much of the South during Reconstruction. The county was known for widespread Ku Klux Klan violence during this time period, against what many inhabitants saw as the excesses of ‘carpetbagger’ government. In the 1920’s, Ezra A. Cook published ‘Ku Klux Klan Secrets Exposed’, which gave this example:

“Headquarters, Ninth Division, S. C. Special Orders, No. 3, K. K. K.

Ignorance is the curse of God.

For that reason we are determined that members of the legislature, the school committee and the county commissioners of Union county shall no longer officiate. Fifteen days' notice from this date is given, and if they, and all, do not at once and forever resign their present inhuman, disgraceful and outrageous rule, then retributive justice will as surely be used as night follows day.

By order of the Grand Chief,

A. 0., Grand Secretary.”

The Industrial Revolution hit the county in the 1890s as local businessmen and Northern industrialists began investing in Union County textile mills.

=== Cotton Mills and industrialization ===
The first cotton mill was built at Lockhart around 1894; it was shortly followed by another in Union and Jonesville. Around 1900, a mill was built west of Union and the town of Buffalo sprang up around it. Workers, or operatives as they were called, lived in company-owned housing and obtained their food and other household goods from the company store. Many workers came from the mountains of North Carolina, where farming was difficult and outside work scarce.

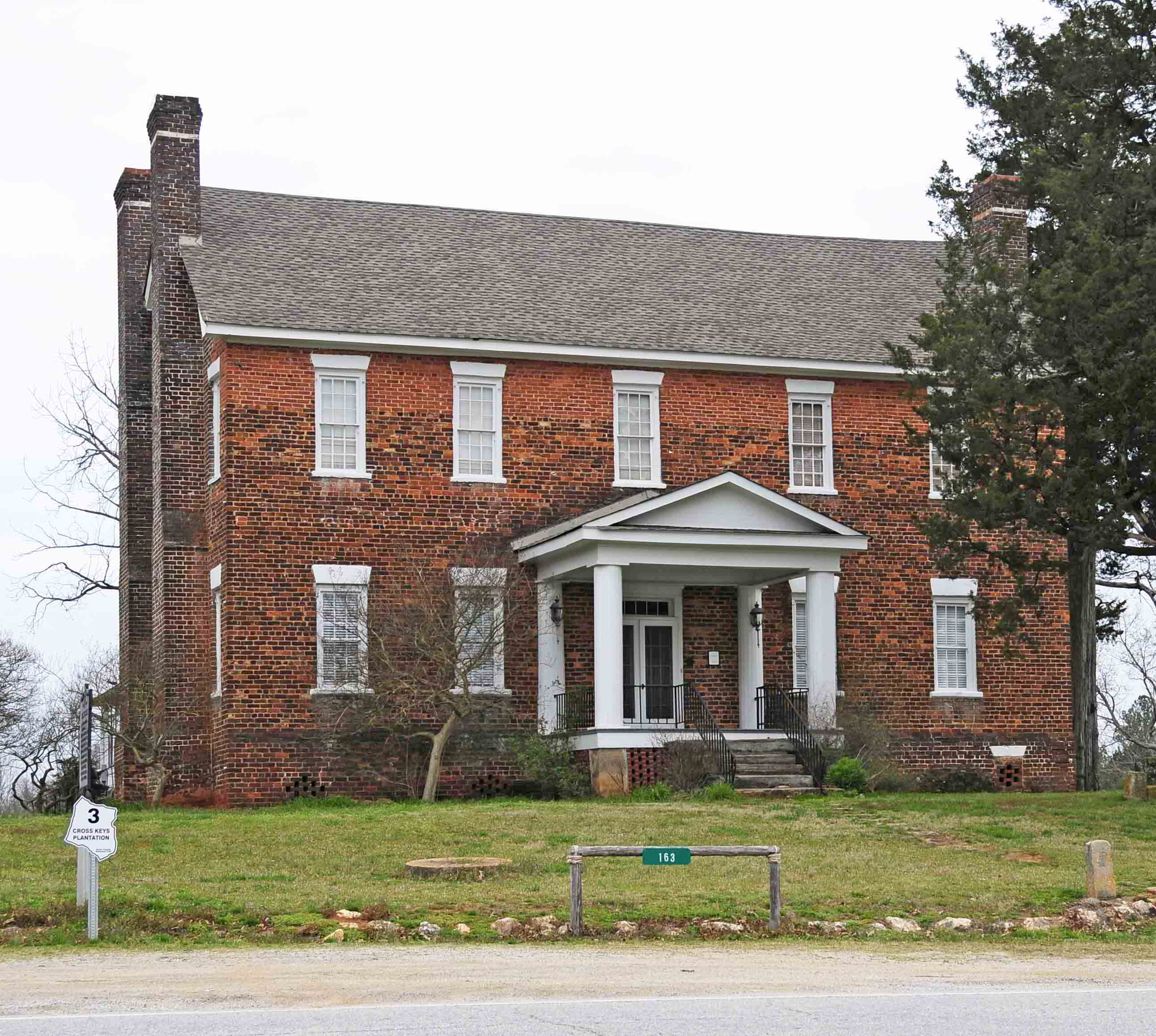
Cross Keys House in the Cross Keys community. Built around 1812–14.

In 1897, the Draytonville and Gowdeysville townships were removed from Union County to form part of Cherokee County.

The turn of the century saw continued progress, as improvements were made in the city of Union and throughout the county. Roads were being paved and the automobile was introduced as new businesses appeared along the Main Street area.

The Great Depression brought difficulties to the mill village, as pay decreased for workers. Meanwhile, in the county's rural areas, farmers suffered much less than those living in the city since they grew most of what they consumed. In the 1930s, the federal government bought large portions of poor quality land in southern Union County and established the Sumter National Forest. This land had been planted in cotton for many years and was overworked. Government programs like the CCC, PWA, and WPA put many Union County residents back to work, and government money helped improve the county's water and sewage plants and public roads. Many Union natives enlisted in the Second World War while developments continued in both urban and rural areas of the county. Cotton production and agricultural acreage was steadily declining and by 1944 Union County was 53 percent "forest land." The automobile had changed the lifestyle of mill workers because now they could drive to work and were no longer required to live in the proximity of the mill villages.

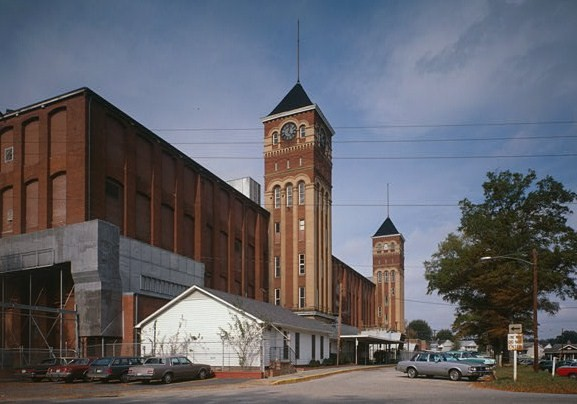
Buffalo Mill in Buffalo

=== Modern times ===
The post-war years saw the introduction of new industries to the county, such as Torrington and Sonoco. Despite this, the county's economy remained 94 percent textile-related in 1970. In 1955, the U.S. Route 176 bypass (Duncan Bypass) was constructed, along with other road improvements that followed in later years. The Bypass became the center for much of Union's new business, including shopping centers and restaurants. In 1984, work on a four-lane connector to Spartanburg began which would become the Furman Fendley Highway (US 176).

Beginning in the 1980s, many of Union County's textile industries began closing and moving to other countries. The final departure of the textile industry was complete by the 1990s and this left a hole in the county's economy and cultural identity. In recent years, new specialty industries have taken the place of agriculture and textiles; two things that characterized the early history of Union County.

== Geography ==
Interactive map of Union County

According to the U.S. Census Bureau, the county has a total area of 515.44 square miles (1,335.0 km^{2}), of which 513.59 square miles (1,330.2 km^{2}) is land and 1.85 square miles (4.8 km^{2}) (0.36%) is water.

=== National protected area ===
- Sumter National Forest (part)

=== State and local protected areas ===
- Rose Hill Plantation State Historic Site
- Sumter National Forest - Enoree Ranger District
- Thurmond Tract Wildlife Management Area
- Wild Turkey Management Demonstration Area

=== Major water bodies ===
- Broad River
- Enoree River
- John D. Long Lake
- Pacolet River
- Tyger River

=== Adjacent counties ===
- Cherokee County – north
- York County – northeast
- Chester County – east
- Fairfield County – southeast
- Newberry County – south
- Laurens County – southwest
- Spartanburg County – northwest

=== Major highways ===
- US 176
- US 176 Conn.
- SC 9
- SC 9 Conn.
- SC 18
- SC 18 Truck
- SC 49
- SC 49 Conn.
- SC 49 Truck
- SC 72
- SC 105
- SC 114
- SC 215
- SC 215 Conn.

== Demographics ==
Historical population
Census	Pop.	Note	%±
1790	7,693		—
1800	10,237		33.1%
1810	10,995		7.4%
1820	14,126		28.5%
1830	17,906		26.8%
1840	18,936		5.8%
1850	19,852		4.8%
1860	19,635		−1.1%
1870	19,248		−2.0%
1880	24,080		25.1%
1890	25,363		5.3%
1900	25,501		0.5%
1910	29,911		17.3%
1920	30,372		1.5%
1930	30,920		1.8%
1940	31,360		1.4%
1950	31,334		−0.1%
1960	30,015		−4.2%
1970	29,230		−2.6%
1980	30,751		5.2%
1990	30,337		−1.3%
2000	29,881		−1.5%
2010	28,961		−3.1%
2020	27,244		−5.9%
2025 (est.)	26,799	▼	−1.6%
U.S. Decennial Census; 1790–1960 1900–1990; 1990–2000 2010 2020

=== Racial and ethnic composition ===
Union County, South Carolina – Racial and ethnic composition Note: the US Census treats Hispanic/Latino as an ethnic category. This table excludes Latinos from the racial categories and assigns them to a separate category. Hispanics/Latinos may be of any race.
Race / Ethnicity (NH = Non-Hispanic)	Pop 1980	Pop 1990	Pop 2000	Pop 2010	Pop 2020	% 1980	% 1990	% 2000	% 2010	% 2020
White alone (NH)	21,532	21,149	20,155	19,146	17,279	70.02%	69.71%	67.45%	66.11%	63.42%
Black or African American alone (NH)	8,925	9,059	9,247	9,022	8,435	29.02%	29.86%	30.95%	31.15%	30.96%
Native American or Alaska Native alone (NH)	24	26	43	63	56	0.08%	0.09%	0.14%	0.22%	0.21%
Asian alone (NH)	36	30	53	79	78	0.12%	0.10%	0.18%	0.27%	0.29%
Native Hawaiian or Pacific Islander alone (NH)	x	x	9	11	3	x	x	0.03%	0.04%	0.01%
Other race alone (NH)	0	4	5	23	49	0.00%	0.01%	0.02%	0.08%	0.18%
Mixed race or Multiracial (NH)	x	x	170	335	906	x	x	0.57%	1.16%	3.33%
Hispanic or Latino (any race)	234	69	199	282	438	0.76%	0.23%	0.67%	0.97%	1.61%
Total	30,751	30,337	29,881	28,961	27,244	100.00%	100.00%	100.00%	100.00%	100.00%

=== 2020 census ===
As of the 2020 census, there were 27,244 people, 11,622 households, and 7,701 families residing in the county. The median age was 45.1 years, with 21.4% of residents under the age of 18 and 21.2% aged 65 or older. For every 100 females there were 91.7 males, and for every 100 females age 18 and over there were 88.2 males age 18 and over.

The racial makeup of the county was 63.8% White, 31.1% Black or African American, 0.2% American Indian and Alaska Native, 0.3% Asian, 0.0% Native Hawaiian and Pacific Islander, 0.7% from some other race, and 3.8% from two or more races; Hispanic or Latino residents of any race comprised 1.6% of the population.

According to the 2020 Decennial Census Demographic and Housing Characteristics (DHC) file, 35.7% of residents lived in urban areas, while 64.3% lived in rural areas.

Of the 11,622 households, 27.5% had children under the age of 18 living with them and 35.0% had a female householder with no spouse or partner present. About 32.3% of all households were made up of individuals and 14.5% had someone living alone who was 65 years of age or older. There were 13,451 housing units, of which 13.6% were vacant; among occupied housing units, 69.4% were owner-occupied and 30.6% were renter-occupied, with homeowner and rental vacancy rates of 1.6% and 7.4%, respectively.

=== 2010 census ===
At the 2010 census, there were 28,961 people, 11,974 households, and 8,095 families residing in the county. The population density was 56.3 inhabitants per square mile (21.7/km^{2}). There were 14,153 housing units at an average density of 27.5 per square mile (10.6/km^{2}). The racial makeup of the county was 66.6% white, 31.3% black or African American, 0.3% Asian, 0.2% American Indian, 0.3% from other races, and 1.2% from two or more races. Those of Hispanic or Latino origin made up 1.0% of the population. In terms of ancestry, 13.4% were American, 8.4% were Irish, 6.2% were English, and 5.4% were German.

Of the 11,974 households, 31.5% had children under the age of 18 living with them, 43.0% were married couples living together, 19.1% had a female householder with no husband present, 32.4% were non-families, and 29.0% of all households were made up of individuals. The average household size was 2.38 and the average family size was 2.90. The median age was 41.9 years.

The median income for a household in the county was $33,470 and the median income for a family was $42,537. Males had a median income of $39,306 versus $26,767 for females. The per capita income for the county was $18,495. About 16.7% of families and 20.1% of the population were below the poverty line, including 27.2% of those under age 18 and 17.1% of those age 65 or over.

== Government and politics ==
In 2020, Union County Sheriff David Taylor was charged with misconduct in office and disseminating obscene material, over lewd and obscene texts sent to a county resident.

United States presidential election results for Union County, South Carolina
Year	Republican		Democratic		Third party(ies)	
Year	No.	%	No.	%	No.	%
1900	91	7.15%	1,182	92.85%	0	0.00%
1904	58	3.51%	1,593	96.49%	0	0.00%
1912	20	1.19%	1,609	95.49%	56	3.32%
1916	0	0.00%	1,476	99.13%	13	0.87%
1920	16	0.73%	2,162	99.27%	0	0.00%
1924	27	1.42%	1,862	98.21%	7	0.37%
1928	74	2.92%	2,460	97.04%	1	0.04%
1932	14	0.44%	3,131	99.49%	2	0.06%
1936	9	0.26%	3,458	99.74%	0	0.00%
1940	29	0.79%	3,662	99.21%	0	0.00%
1944	33	1.05%	3,041	96.48%	78	2.47%
1948	46	1.35%	1,283	37.53%	2,090	61.13%
1952	2,094	26.13%	5,921	73.87%	0	0.00%
1956	1,252	22.01%	3,760	66.10%	676	11.88%
1960	1,980	27.47%	5,229	72.53%	0	0.00%
1964	3,815	49.50%	3,892	50.50%	0	0.00%
1968	3,011	30.50%	2,271	23.00%	4,590	46.50%
1972	8,337	75.35%	2,676	24.18%	52	0.47%
1976	3,463	35.11%	6,363	64.51%	37	0.38%
1980	4,035	38.59%	6,274	60.00%	147	1.41%
1984	6,331	58.64%	4,424	40.98%	41	0.38%
1988	6,019	57.52%	4,420	42.24%	26	0.25%
1992	4,647	43.51%	4,644	43.48%	1,389	13.01%
1996	3,855	38.34%	5,407	53.77%	793	7.89%
2000	5,768	54.47%	4,662	44.03%	159	1.50%
2004	6,592	55.24%	5,236	43.87%	106	0.89%
2008	7,449	54.97%	5,935	43.80%	167	1.23%
2012	6,584	52.50%	5,796	46.22%	161	1.28%
2016	7,061	58.39%	4,729	39.11%	302	2.50%
2020	8,183	61.73%	4,935	37.23%	139	1.05%
2024	8,102	65.93%	4,084	33.23%	103	0.84%

== Economy ==
In 2022, the GDP was $822.7 million (about $30,896 per capita), and the real GDP was $709.5 million (about $26,643 per capita) in chained 2017 dollars.

As of April 2024, some of the top employers of the county include Adecco Staffing, CSL Plasma, Dollar General, Gestamp, Milliken & Company, Sonoco, Spartanburg Regional Healthcare System, Timken Company, University of South Carolina Union, and Walmart.

Employment and Wage Statistics by Industry in Union County, South Carolina - Q3 2023
Industry	Employment Counts	Employment Percentage (%)	Average Annual Wage ($)
Accommodation and Food Services	564	6.7	19,032
Administrative and Support and Waste Management and Remediation Services	226	2.7	32,448
Agriculture, Forestry, Fishing and Hunting	30	0.4	63,908
Arts, Entertainment, and Recreation	168	2.0	52,780
Construction	157	1.9	54,236
Educational Services	718	8.5	62,712
Finance and Insurance	59	0.7	34,112
Health Care and Social Assistance	1,842	21.7	59,644
Information	138	1.6	59,280
Management of Companies and Enterprises	43	0.5	39,364
Manufacturing	673	7.9	45,344
Other Services (except Public Administration)	54	0.6	34,736
Professional, Scientific, and Technical Services	803	9.5	75,208
Public Administration	74	0.9	58,648
Real Estate and Rental and Leasing	89	1.0	27,612
Retail Trade	710	8.4	27,612
Transportation and Warehousing	710	8.4	60,476
Utilities	710	8.4	72,488
Wholesale Trade	710	8.4	52,208
Total	8,478	100.0%	53,645

== Education ==
Students residing in the county are served by Union County Schools, which operates seven public schools that serve about 4500 students. There is one high school, three kindergarten through 5th grade schools, two kindergarten through 8th grade schools, and one 6th through 8th grade school.

For some time, the county had three high schools, Union High School, Jonesville High School, and Lockhart High School. As of a council ruling, the three high schools have been consolidated. Jonesville High School and Lockhart High School were closed, and the students were reassigned to Union High School, which has been renamed Union County High School.

Union County High School's Yellow Jackets Football team has seen great success in recent past. They won the 4A State Football Championship in 1990 and 1995, and won the 3A State Title in 1999, 2000, and 2002. They were also state runner-up in 2001. The Yellow Jackets were led to their three most recent championships by former head coach and current State Representative Mike Anthony. He retired following the 2004 season. He was succeeded by Tommy Bobo, former Union High School offensive coordinator who left following the 1999 season to become the head football coach at Wren High School. Bobo led the Jackets to the region championship and the state semi-finals in 2005. Bobo resigned in 2007 after the school board decided to consolidate the three high schools. He accepted a position as an assistant at Spartanburg's Dorman High School. Jonesville High School Coach David Lipsey was hired to replace Bobo and be the first coach of Union County High School.

Union County High School's Junior ROTC program is only one of three teams in the nation to ever go four consecutive years to The George C. Marshall Leadership and Academic Bowl in Washington, DC. Members of that team included Michael Leigh, Tommy McKelvey, Micheal Stewart, Lucas Kelley, Ollie Burns, and Mitchell Ward.

The county is also home to University of South Carolina Union, a satellite campus of the University of South Carolina. The University of South Carolina campus at Union was opened in 1965 and was once home to the USCU Bantams, a junior college basketball team that saw some success at that level before the team was ended in the 1980s. Since 1965, USC-Union has provided low-cost, fully accredited courses that satisfy the degree requirements at the University of South Carolina and at other colleges and universities. The University of South Carolina at Union enrolls between 300 and 400 students each semester. In addition to associate degrees, USC-Union provides special opportunities such as teacher preparation and access to baccalaureate degrees in interdisciplinary studies.

Union county's Carnegie Library was named Best Small Library in America by Library Journal for 2009.

== Communities ==
=== City ===
- Union (county seat and largest community)

=== Towns ===
- Carlisle
- Jonesville
- Lockhart

=== Census-designated places ===
- Buffalo
- Monarch Mill

=== Unincorporated communities ===
- Cross Keys
- Santuc
- Fish Dam
- Bogansville
- Goshen Hill
- Pinckney

== Notable people ==
- John Duff (c. 1759 or c. 1750–June 4, 1799, or c. 1805), counterfeiter, hunter, salt maker, judge, cattle thief, and Revolutionary War soldier
- William Henry Gist (1807–1874), governor of South Carolina from 1858 to 1860
- States Rights Gist (1831–1864), Confederate general in the Civil War
- John William Pearson (1808–1864), businessman and Confederate soldier in the Civil War
- Howard Franklin Jeter (born 1947), retired diplomat
- Susan Smith (born 1971), murderer who killed her two sons and falsely claimed that they were kidnapped by an African-American man; her story gained national attention

== See also ==
- List of counties in South Carolina
- National Register of Historic Places listings in Union County, South Carolina
