= List of college athletic programs in South Carolina =

This is a list of college athletic programs in the U.S. state of South Carolina.

== NCAA ==
=== Division I ===
Full NCAA Division I member colleges in South Carolina.
- FBS Football, - FCS Football, - Non-football

Team	School	City	Conference	Sport sponsorship																							
Team	School	City	Conference	Baseball	Basketball		Beach Volleyball	Cross Country		Football	Golf		Lacrosse		Rifle	Soccer		Softball	Swimming		Tennis		Track & Field		Volleyball		Wrestling
Team	School	City	Conference	Baseball	M	W	Beach Volleyball	M	W	Football	M	W	M	W	Rifle	M	W	Softball	M	W	M	W	M	W	M	W	Wrestling
Charleston Cougars	College of Charleston	Charleston	Coastal	Yes	Yes	Yes	Yes	Yes	Yes	No	Yes	Yes	No	No	No	Yes	Yes	Yes	No	No	Yes	Yes	No	Yes	No	Yes	No
Charleston Southern Buccaneers	Charleston Southern University	North Charleston	Big South	Yes	Yes	Yes	No	Yes	Yes	FCS	Yes	Yes	No	No	No	Yes	Yes	Yes	No	No	No	Yes	Yes	Yes	No	Yes	No
The Citadel Bulldogs	The Citadel, The Military College of South Carolina	Charleston	Southern	Yes	Yes	No	No	Yes	Yes	FCS	No	Yes	No	No	Yes	No	Yes	No	No	No	Yes	No	Yes	Yes	No	Yes	Yes
Clemson Tigers	Clemson University	Clemson	ACC	Yes	Yes	Yes	No	Yes	Yes	FBS	Yes	Yes	No	Yes	No	Yes	Yes	Yes	No	No	Yes	Yes	Yes	Yes	No	Yes	No
Coastal Carolina Chanticleers	Coastal Carolina University	Conway	Sun Belt	Yes	Yes	Yes	Yes	Yes	Yes	FBS	Yes	Yes	No	Yes	No	Yes	Yes	Yes	No	No	Yes	Yes	Yes	Yes	No	Yes	No
Furman Paladins	Furman University	Greenville	Southern	No	Yes	Yes	No	Yes	Yes	FCS	Yes	Yes	No	Yes	No	Yes	Yes	Yes	No	No	Yes	Yes	Yes	Yes	No	Yes	No
Presbyterian Blue Hose	Presbyterian College	Clinton	Big South	Yes	Yes	Yes	No	Yes	Yes	FCS (Note: Presbyterian's football team competes in the Pioneer Football League.)	Yes	Yes	No	Yes	No	Yes	Yes	Yes	No	No	Yes	Yes	No	No	No	Yes	Yes
South Carolina Gamecocks	University of South Carolina	Columbia	SEC	Yes	Yes	Yes	Yes	No	Yes	FBS	Yes	Yes	No	No	No	Yes (Note: South Carolina's men's soccer team competes in the Sun Belt.)	Yes	Yes	Yes	Yes	Yes	Yes	Yes	Yes	No	Yes	No
South Carolina State Bulldogs and Lady Bulldogs	South Carolina State University	Orangeburg	MEAC	No	Yes	Yes	No	Yes	Yes	FCS	No	No	No	No	No	Yes	Yes (Note: South Carolina State's women's soccer team competes as an independent.)	Yes	No	No	Yes	Yes	No	No	No	Yes	No
USC Upstate Spartans	University of South Carolina Upstate	Spartanburg	Big South	Yes	Yes	Yes	No	Yes	Yes	No	Yes	Yes	No	No	No	Yes	Yes	Yes	No	No	No	No	Yes	Yes	No	Yes	No
Winthrop Eagles	Winthrop University	Rock Hill	Big South	Yes	Yes	Yes	No	Yes	Yes	No	Yes	Yes	No	Yes	No	Yes	Yes	Yes	No	No	No	No	Yes	Yes	No	Yes	No
Wofford Terriers	Wofford College	Spartanburg	Southern	Yes	Yes	Yes	No	Yes	Yes	FCS	Yes	No	No	Yes	Yes	Yes	Yes	Yes	No	No	No	Yes	Yes	Yes	No	Yes	No

=== Division II ===
Full NCAA Division II member colleges in South Carolina.
- Football, - Non-football

Team	School	City	Conference	Sport sponsorship																							
Team	School	City	Conference	Baseball	Basketball		Beach Volleyball	Cross Country		Field Hockey	Football	Golf		Lacrosse		Soccer		Softball	Swimming		Tennis		Track & Field		Volleyball		Wrestling
Team	School	City	Conference	Baseball	M	W	Beach Volleyball	M	W	Field Hockey	Football	M	W	M	W	M	W	Softball	M	W	M	W	M	W	M	W	Wrestling
Allen Yellow Jackets	Allen University	Columbia	SIAC	No	Yes	Yes	No	Yes	Yes	No	Yes	No	No	No	No	No	Yes (Note: Allen's women's soccer team competes as an independent.)	Yes	No	No	No	No	Yes	Yes	No	Yes	Yes
Anderson Trojans	Anderson University	Anderson	South Atlantic	Yes	Yes	Yes	No	Yes	Yes	No	Yes	Yes	Yes	Yes	Yes	Yes	Yes	Yes	No	No	Yes	Yes	Yes	Yes	No	Yes	No
Benedict Tigers	Benedict College	Columbia	SIAC	Yes	Yes	Yes	No	Yes	Yes	No	Yes	No	No	No	No	No	No	Yes	No	No	Yes	Yes	Yes	Yes	Yes	Yes	No
Claflin Panthers	Claflin University	Orangeburg	CIAA	Yes (Note: Claflin's baseball team competes in the Peach Belt Conference.)	Yes	Yes	No	Yes	Yes	No	No	No	No	No	No	No	No	Yes	No	No	No	No	Yes	Yes	No	Yes	No
Coker Cobras	Coker University	Hartsville	South Atlantic	Yes	Yes	Yes	No	Yes	Yes	Yes	No	Yes	Yes	Yes	Yes	Yes	Yes	Yes	No	No	Yes	Yes	Yes	Yes	No	Yes	Yes
Converse Valkyries	Converse University	Spartanburg	Carolinas	No	Yes	Yes	No	Yes	Yes	Yes	No	No	Yes	No	Yes	Yes	Yes	Yes	Yes	Yes	Yes	Yes	Yes	Yes	No	Yes	No
Erskine Flying Fleet	Erskine College	Due West	Carolinas	Yes	Yes	Yes	Yes	Yes	Yes	No	Yes	Yes	Yes	No	Yes	Yes	Yes	Yes	No	No	No	Yes	Yes	Yes	Yes	Yes	No
Francis Marion Patriots	Francis Marion University	Florence	Carolinas	Yes	Yes	Yes	No	Yes	Yes	No	No	Yes	No	No	No	Yes	Yes	Yes	No	No	Yes	Yes	Yes	Yes	No	Yes	No
Lander Bearcats	Lander University	Greenwood	Peach Belt	Yes	Yes	Yes	No	Yes	Yes	Yes	No	Yes	Yes	Yes	Yes	Yes	Yes	Yes	No	No	Yes	Yes	Yes	Yes	No	Yes	Yes
Newberry Wolves	Newberry College	Newberry	South Atlantic	Yes	Yes	Yes	No	Yes	Yes	Yes	Yes	Yes	Yes	Yes	Yes	Yes	Yes	Yes	No	No	Yes	Yes	Yes	Yes	No	Yes	Yes
North Greenville Crusaders	North Greenville University	Tigerville	Carolinas	Yes	Yes	Yes	No	Yes	Yes	No	Yes	Yes	Yes	Yes	Yes	Yes	Yes	Yes	No	No	Yes	Yes	Yes	Yes	Yes	Yes	No
Southern Wesleyan Warriors	Southern Wesleyan University	Central	Carolinas	Yes	Yes	Yes	No	Yes	Yes	No	No	No	No	No	Yes	Yes	Yes	Yes	No	No	No	No	Yes	Yes	No	Yes	No
USC Aiken Pacers	University of South Carolina Aiken	Aiken	Peach Belt	Yes	Yes	Yes	No	Yes	Yes	No	No	Yes	No	No	No	Yes	Yes	No	No	No	No	No	No	No	No	Yes	No
USC Beaufort Sand Sharks	University of South Carolina Beaufort	Bluffton	Peach Belt	Yes	Yes	Yes	No	Yes	Yes	No	No	Yes	Yes	No	No	No	Yes	Yes	No	No	No	No	Yes	Yes	No	No	No

== NAIA ==
Full NAIA member colleges in South Carolina.
- Non-football

Team	School	City	Conference	Sport sponsorship																						
Team	School	City	Conference	Baseball	Basketball		Beach Volleyball	Cross Country		Football	Golf		Lacrosse		Soccer		Softball	Swimming		Tennis		Track & Field		Volleyball		Wrestling
Team	School	City	Conference	Baseball	M	W	Beach Volleyball	M	W	Football	M	W	M	W	M	W	Softball	M	W	M	W	M	W	M	W	Wrestling
CIU Rams	Columbia International University	Columbia	Appalachian	Yes	Yes	Yes	No	Yes	Yes	No	Yes	No	No	No	Yes	Yes	Yes	No	No	No	No	Yes	Yes	No	Yes	No
Columbia College Koalas	Columbia College	Columbia	Appalachian	No	Yes	Yes	No	Yes	Yes	No	Yes	Yes	No	No	Yes	Yes	Yes	Yes	Yes	Yes	Yes	Yes	Yes	No	Yes	No
Morris Hornets	Morris College	Sumter	Independent	Yes	Yes	Yes	No	No	No	No	No	No	No	No	No	No	Yes	No	No	No	No	Yes	Yes	No	Yes	No
Spartanburg Methodist Pioneers	Spartanburg Methodist College	Spartanburg	Appalachian	Yes	Yes	Yes	Yes	Yes	Yes	No	Yes	Yes	No	No	Yes	Yes	Yes	No	No	No	No	Yes	Yes	No	Yes	No
Voorhees Tigers	Voorhees University	Denmark	HBCUAC	Yes	Yes	Yes	No	Yes	Yes	No	No	No	No	No	No	No	Yes	No	No	No	No	Yes	Yes	No	No	No

== NJCAA ==
Full NJCAA member colleges in South Carolina.
- Non-football

Team	School	City	Conference
Denmark Tech Panthers	Denmark Technical College	Denmark	Carolinas JC
Florence-Darlington Tech Stingers	Florence-Darlington Technical College	Florence	Carolinas JC
USC Lancaster Lancers	University of South Carolina Lancaster	Lancaster	Carolinas JC
USC Salkehatchie Indians	University of South Carolina Salkehatchie	Allendale	Carolinas JC
USC Sumter Fire Ants	University of South Carolina Sumter	Sumter	Carolinas JC
USC Union Bantams	University of South Carolina Union	Union	Carolinas JC)<

== NCCAA ==
Team	School	City	Conference
CIU Rams (Note: CIU is also a member of the NAIA.)	Columbia International University	Columbia	Division I-South
Bob Jones Bruins	Bob Jones University	Greenville	Division II-South

== USCAA ==
Team	School	City	Conference
Clinton Golden Bears	Clinton College	Rock Hill	Eastern Metro

== See also ==
- List of NCAA Division I institutions
- List of NCAA Division II institutions
- List of NCAA Division III institutions
- List of NAIA institutions
- List of USCAA institutions
- List of NCCAA institutions
- List of NJCAA Division I institutions
- List of NJCAA Division II institutions
- List of NJCAA Division III institutions
