= List of Lambda Pi Eta chapters =

Lambda Pi Eta is an international communication studies honor society, associated with the National Communication Association. Lambda Pi Eta was established in 1984 at the University of Arkansas and has more than 500 active chapters. Following are its active chapters as June 2020, with active chapters indicated in bold and inactive chapters and institutions in italics.

Chapter	Charter date and range	Institution	Location	Status	Ref.
Alpha	1985	University of Arkansas	Fayetteville, Arkansas	Active	
Beta	1988	North Carolina State University	Raleigh, North Carolina	Active	
Delta		University of Mount Saint Vincent	Riverdale, Bronx, New York City, New York	Active	
Epsilon	1988	University of Lynchburg	Lynchburg, Virginia	Active	
Zeta		Montclair State University	Montclair, New Jersey	Active	
Eta		Molloy University	Rockville Centre, New York	Active	
Kappa		Monmouth College	Monmouth, Illinois	Active	
Lambda		College of Wooster	Wooster, Ohio	Active	
Nu		Truman State University	Kirksville, Missouri	Active	
Omicron		Penn State Erie, The Behrend College	Erie, Pennsylvania	Active	
Pi		University of Maryland, College Park	College Park, Maryland	Active	
Rho		Florida State University	Tallahassee, Florida	Active	
Upsilon		Kent State University	Kent, Ohio	Active	
Psi		Gustavus Adolphus College	St. Peter, Minnesota	Active	
Omega		Barry University	Miami Shores, Florida	Active	
Alpha Alpha		Trinity University	San Antonio, Texas	Active	
Alpha Beta		University of Hartford	West Hartford, Connecticut	Active	
Alpha Gamma		University of Tennessee	Knoxville, Tennessee	Active	
Alpha Delta		Hope College	Holland, Michigan	Active	
Alpha Theta		Kennesaw State University	Cobb County, Georgia	Active	
Alpha Iota		Old Dominion University	Norfolk, Virginia	Active	
Alpha Kappa		Wilkes University	Wilkes-Barre, Pennsylvania	Active	
Alpha Mu		University of Kansas	Lawrence, Kansas	Active	
Alpha Nu		Azusa Pacific University	Azusa, California	Active	
Alpha Xi	1993	The College of New Jersey	Ewing Township, New Jersey.	Active	
Alpha Omicron		University of Nebraska at Kearney	Kearney, Nebraska	Active	
Alpha Pi		University of St. Thomas	Saint Paul, Minnesota	Active	
Alpha Rho		Villanova University	Villanova, Pennsylvania	Active	
Alpha Sigma		Abilene Christian University	Abilene, Texas	Active	
Alpha Tau		California Polytechnic State University, San Luis Obispo	San Luis Obispo, California	Active	
Alpha Upsilon		McKendree University	Lebanon, Illinois	Active	
Alpha Phi		Missouri State University	Springfield, Missouri	Active	
Alpha Omega		Stonehill College	Easton, Massachusetts	Active	
Beta Alpha		Luther College	Decorah, Iowa	Active	
Beta Beta		West Virginia Wesleyan College	Buckhannon, West Virginia	Active	
Beta Gamma		University of Rhode Island	Kingston, Rhode Island	Active	
Beta Delta		Alma College	Alma, Michigan	Active	
Beta Eta		State University of New York at Geneseo	Geneseo, New York	Active	
Beta Theta		Valdosta State University	Valdosta, Georgia	Active	
Beta Lambda		Michigan State University	East Lansing, Michigan	Active	
Beta Mu		Ohio University	Athens, Ohio	Active	
Beta Xi		William Paterson University	Wayne, New Jersey	Active	
Beta Pi		Fordham University	New York City, New York	Active	
Beta Rho		Loyola University Maryland	Baltimore, Maryland	Active	
Beta Sigma		Northwest Missouri State University	Maryville, Missouri	Active	
Beta Upsilon		Slippery Rock University	Slippery Rock, Pennsylvania	Active	
Beta Chi		University of St. Thomas		Active	
Beta Psi		St. Cloud State University	St. Cloud, Minnesota	Active	
Gamma Alpha		Shippensburg University of Pennsylvania	Shippensburg, Pennsylvania	Active	
Gamma Beta		James Madison University	Harrisonburg, Virginia	Active	
Gamma Delta		Westfield State University	Westfield, Massachusetts	Active	
Gamma Zeta		Purdue University	West Lafayette, Indiana	Active	
Gamma Iota		Pace University	Pleasantville, New York	Active	
Gamma Kappa		St. Mary's University, Texas	San Antonio, Texas	Active	
Gamma Lambda		Ithaca College	Ithaca, New York	Active	
Gamma Mu		Bridgewater State University	Bridgewater, Massachusetts	Active	
Gamma Pi		University of Wisconsin–Parkside	Kenosha, Wisconsin	Active	
Gamma Rho		Montana State University, Billings	Billings, Montana	Active	
Gamma Tau		West Chester University	West Chester, Pennsylvania	Active	
Gamma Upsilon		Wake Forest University	Winston-Salem, North Carolina	Active	
Gamma Phi		West Texas A&M University	Canyon, Texas	Active	
Gamma Chi		East Stroudsburg University of Pennsylvania	East Stroudsburg, Pennsylvania	Active	
Gamma Omega		Illinois College	Jacksonville, Illinois	Active	
Delta Beta		Texas State University	San Marcos, Texas	Active	
Delta Gamma		University of Colorado Colorado Springs	Colorado Springs, Colorado.	Active	
Delta Epsilon	1996	Ferris State University	Big Rapids, Michigan	Active	
Delta Zeta		Boston College	Chestnut Hill, Massachusetts	Active	
Delta Eta		University of Nevada, Las Vegas	Paradise, Nevada	Active	
Delta Theta		Salisbury University	Salisbury, Maryland	Active	
Delta Mu		St. Edwards University	Austin, Texas	Active	
Delta Xi		State University of New York at Plattsburgh	Plattsburgh, New York	Active	
Delta Omicron		State University of New York at Potsdam	Potsdam, New York	Active	
Delta Pi		California State Polytechnic University, Humboldt	Arcata, California	Active	
Delta Rho		Metropolitan State University of Denver	Denver, Colorado	Active	
Delta Upsilon		Denison University	Granville, Ohio	Active	
Delta Phi		Minnesota State University, Mankato	Mankato, Minnesota	Active	
Delta Chi		Carroll University	Waukesha, Wisconsin	Active	
Delta Psi	1996	Vanderbilt University	Nashville, Tennessee	Active	
Delta Omega		Juniata College	Huntingdon, Pennsylvania	Active	
Epsilon Alpha		St. Catherine University	Saint Paul, Minnesota	Active	
Epsilon Beta	December 2013	University of Memphis	Memphis, Tennessee	Active	(Note: Chapter was chartered in December 2013 and inducted its first members in April 2014.)
Epsilon Epsilon		McDaniel College	Westminster, Maryland	Active	
Epsilon Eta		Canisius University	Buffalo, New York	Active	
Epsilon Theta		University of Pittsburgh at Greensburg	Hempfield Township, Pennsylvania	Active	
Epsilon Iota		Newman University	Wichita, Kansas	Active	
Epsilon Lambda		Kean University	Union Township, New Jersey	Active	
Epsilon Mu		Widener University	Chester, Pennsylvania	Active	
Epsilon Nu		Baldwin Wallace University	Berea, Ohio	Active	
Epsilon Xi		George Washington University	Washington, D.C.	Active	
Epsilon Omicron		Texas A&M University–Corpus Christi	Corpus Christi, Texas	Active	
Epsilon Rho		Pacific Union College	Angwin, California	Active	
Epsilon Sigma		Fairfield University	Fairfield, Connecticut	Active	
Epsilon Tau		Creighton University	Omaha, Nebraska	Active	
Epsilon Upsilon		Hofstra University	Hempstead, New York	Active	
Epsilon Chi		Rhode Island College	Providence, Rhode Island	Active	
Epsilon Omega		University of Pittsburgh at Johnstown	Johnstown, Pennsylvania	Active	
Zeta Alpha		University of Portland	Portland, Oregon	Active	
Zeta Beta		Adelphi University	Garden City, New York	Active	
Zeta Delta		Rutgers University–New Brunswick	New Brunswick, New Jersey	Active	
Zeta Epsilon		Clemson University	Clemson, South Carolina	Active	
Zeta Zeta		University of Mount Union	Alliance, Ohio	Active	
Zeta Iota		Florida Atlantic University	Boca Raton, Florida	Active	
Zeta Lambda		Hiram College	Hiram, Ohio	Active	
Zeta Nu		Marymount Manhattan College	Manhattan, New York	Active	
Zeta Rho		Pennsylvania State University	University Park, Pennsylvania	Active	
Zeta Sigma		University of South Alabama	Mobile, Alabama	Active	
Zeta Tau		University of Georgia	Athens, Georgia	Active	
Zeta Upsilon		University of North Carolina at Greensboro	Greensboro, North Carolina	Active	
Zeta Phi		Georgetown College	Georgetown, Kentucky	Active	
Zeta Chi	April 1998	Mississippi Valley State University	Mississippi Valley State, Mississippi	Active	
Zeta Psi		Messiah University	Mechanicsburg, Pennsylvania	Active	
Zeta Omega		University of Wisconsin–La Crosse	La Crosse, Wisconsin	Active	
Eta Beta		St. Joseph's University, Brooklyn	Brooklyn, New York	Active	
Eta Epsilon		Morehead State University	Morehead, Kentucky	Active	
Eta Eta		John Carroll University	University Heights, Ohio	Active	
Eta Kappa		Huntingdon College	Montgomery, Alabama	Active	
Eta Lambda		DePaul University	Chicago, Illinois	Active	
Eta Nu		Fontbonne University	Clayton, Missouri	Active	
Eta Xi		Pfeiffer University	Misenheimer, North Carolina	Active	
Eta Pi		University of Alabama	Tuscaloosa, Alabama	Active	
Eta Rho		Western Michigan University	Kalamazoo, Michigan	Active	
Eta Sigma		Marietta College	Marietta, Ohio	Active	
Eta Tau		Hawaii Pacific University	Honolulu, Hawaii	Active	
Eta Upsilon		Howard University	Washington, D.C.	Active	
Eta Chi		Aquinas College	Grand Rapids, Michigan	Active	
Eta Psi		Eastern Illinois University	Charleston, Illinois	Active	
Eta Omega		Troy University	Troy, Alabama	Active	
Theta Alpha		Mississippi State University	Mississippi State, Mississippi	Active	
Theta Beta		Olivet Nazarene University	Bourbonnais, Illinois	Active	
Theta Delta		Bryant University	Smithfield, Rhode Island	Active	
Theta Epsilon		Bellarmine University	Louisville, Kentucky	Active	
Theta Eta		Illinois State University	Normal, Illinois	Active	
Theta Iota		Culver–Stockton College	Canton, Missouri	Active	
Theta Kappa	1999	University of North Carolina at Chapel Hill	Chapel Hill, North Carolina	Active	
Theta Lambda		University of Colorado Denver	Denver, Colorado	Active	
Theta Mu		Oklahoma Baptist University	Shawnee, Oklahoma	Active	
Theta Omicron		Westmont College	Montecito, California	Active	
Theta Rho	1999	Santa Clara University	Santa Clara, California	Active	
Theta Sigma		Ohio Northern University	Ada, Ohio	Active	
Theta Tau		Clark Atlanta University	Atlanta, Georgia	Active	
Theta Upsilon		University of Findlay	Findlay, Ohio	Active	
Theta Chi		Ursinus College	Collegeville, Pennsylvania	Active	
Theta Psi		Northwest Nazarene University	Nampa, Idaho	Active	
Iota Alpha		Angelo State University	San Angelo, Texas	Active	
Iota Epsilon		Indiana State University	Terre Haute, Indiana	Active	
Iota Eta		Oakland University	Rochester, Michigan	Active	
Iota Theta		University of Richmond	Richmond, Virginia	Active	
Iota Iota		Otterbein University	Westerville, Ohio	Active	
Iota Lambda		Cleveland State University	Cleveland, Ohio	Active	
Iota Nu		Gallaudet University	Washington, D.C.	Active	
Iota Omicron		Texas A&M University	College Station, Texas	Active	
Iota Pi		Youngstown State University	Youngstown, Ohio	Active	
Iota Rho		Gonzaga University	Spokane, Washington	Active	
Iota Tau	2001	Stetson University	DeLand, Florida	Active	
Iota Psi		Southern Illinois University Edwardsville	Edwardsville, Illinois	Active	
Kappa Delta		Southeast Missouri State University	Cape Girardeau, Missouri	Active	
Kappa Epsilon		University of Nebraska–Lincoln	Lincoln, Nebraska	Active	
Kappa Zeta		Arizona State University	Tempe, Arizona	Active	
Kappa Iota	1994	University of San Francisco	San Francisco, California	Active	
Kappa Kappa		Governors State University	University Park, Illinois	Active	
Kappa Lambda		Chapman University	Orange, California	Active	
Kappa Xi		Rollins College	Winter Park, Florida	Active	
Kappa Pi		Northeastern Illinois University	Chicago, Illinois	Active	
Kappa Rho	2000	Indiana University Indianapolis	Indianapolis, Indiana	Active	(Note: Chapter formed at Indiana University–Purdue University Indianapolis. IUPUI split into Indiana University Indianapolis and Purdue University in Indianapolis on July 1, 2024. The Kappa Rho chapter remained at IUI.)
Kappa Sigma		Saginaw Valley State University	University Center, Michigan	Active	
Kappa Upsilon		University of Arkansas at Little Rock	Little Rock, Arkansas	Active	
Kappa Phi		California State University, Chico	Chico, California	Active	
Kappa Chi		Roosevelt University	Chicago, Illinois	Active	
Kappa Psi		Southern Adventist University	Collegedale Tennessee	Active	
Kappa Omega		Northern Illinois University	DeKalb, Illinois	Active	
Lambda Beta		Sam Houston State University	Huntsville, Texas	Active	
Lambda Delta		Bridgewater College	Bridgewater, Virginia	Active	
Lambda Theta	2013	Wayne State University	Detroit, Michigan	Active	
Lambda Eta		Our Lady of the Lake University	San Antonio, Texas	Active	
Lambda Iota		St. Joseph's University, Long Island	Long Island, New York	Active	
Lambda Kappa		George Fox University	Newberg, Oregon	Active	
Lambda Lambda		Meredith College	Raleigh, North Carolina	Active	
Lambda Mu		Radford University	Radford, Virginia	Active	
Lambda Nu		University of Montevallo	Montevallo, Alabama	Active	
Lambda Xi		Monmouth University	West Long Branch, New Jersey	Active	
Lambda Pi		University of Scranton	Scranton, Pennsylvania	Active	
Lambda Rho		Morgan State University	Baltimore, Maryland	Active	
Lambda Sigma		Virginia Wesleyan University	Virginia Beach, Virginia	Active	
Lambda Tau		Holy Family University	Philadelphia, Pennsylvania	Active	
Lambda Upsilon		Marist University	Poughkeepsie, New York	Active	
Lambda Phi	July 19, 2000	Baylor University	Waco, Texas	Active	(Note: Chapter was chartered on July 19, 2000, and became an official student organization on January 27, 2023.)
Lambda Chi		Curry College	Milton, Massachusetts	Active	
Lambda Psi		Wartburg College	Waverly, Iowa	Active	
Mu Alpha	2001	University of North Texas	Denton, Texas	Active	
Mu Delta		SUNY Brockport	Brockport, New York	Active	
Mu Epsilon		University of Maine	Orono, Maine	Active	
Mu Eta		St. Mary's University, Texas	San Antonio, Texas	Active	
Mu Gamma		Wayne State College	Wayne, Nebraska	Active	
Mu Iota		Pace University Pleasantville	Pleasantville, New York	Active	
Mu Kappa		Loyola University Maryland	Baltimore, Maryland	Active	
Mu Mu		Marian University	Fond du Lac, Wisconsin	Active	
Mu Omicron		Coker University	Hartsville, South Carolina	Active	
Mu Tau		Rowan University	Glassboro, New Jersey	Active	
Mu Upsilon		Fitchburg State University	Fitchburg, Massachusetts	Active	
Mu Phi		Texas Tech University	Lubbock, Texas	Active	
Mu Chi		Shorter University	Rome, Georgia	Active	
Mu Psi		Regis College	Weston, Massachusetts	Active	
Mu Omega		Millikin University	Decatur, Illinois	Active	
Nu Alpha		University at Albany, SUNY	Albany, New York	Active	
Nu Beta		Concordia University Texas	Austin, Texas	Active	
Nu Gamma		University of Puget Sound	Tacoma, Washington	Active	
Nu Epsilon		Longwood University	Farmville, Virginia	Active	
Nu Zeta		Walla Walla University	College Place, Washington	Active	
Nu Eta		Pittsburg State University	Pittsburg, Kansas	Active	
Nu Theta		Furman University	Greenville, South Carolina	Active	
Nu Kappa		University of Dubuque	Dubuque, Iowa	Active	
Nu Lambda		University of North Carolina at Charlotte	Charlotte, North Carolina	Active	
Nu Mu		Keuka College	Keuka Park, New York	Active	
Nu Nu		Cedarville University	Cedarville, Ohio	Active	
Nu Xi		Endicott College	Beverly, Massachusetts	Active	
Nu Omicron		University of Wisconsin–Stevens Point	Stevens Point, Wisconsin	Active	
Nu Pi		Winona State University	Winona, Minnesota	Active	
Nu Rho		University of South Carolina Aiken	Aiken, South Carolina	Active	
Nu Sigma		Central Michigan University	Mount Pleasant, Michigan	Active	
Nu Tau		University of San Diego	San Diego, California	Active	
Nu Phi		Western Oregon University	Monmouth, Oregon	Active	
Nu Omega		Hobart and William Smith Colleges	Geneva, New York	Active	
Xi Alpha		Regis University	Denver, Colorado	Active	
Xi Delta		Eastern University	St. Davids, Pennsylvania	Active	
Xi Epsilon		Sul Ross State University	Alpine, Texas	Active	
Xi Eta		La Salle University	Philadelphia, Pennsylvania	Active	
Xi Gamma		Ohio University - Lancaster	Lancaster, Ohio	Active	
Xi Iota		DePauw University	Greencastle, Indiana	Active	
Xi Kappa		Kutztown University of Pennsylvania	Kutztown, Pennsylvania	Active	
Xi Mu		University of South Florida	Tampa, Florida	Active	
Xi Nu		West Virginia University	Morgantown, West Virginia	Active	
Xi Xi		University of Northwestern – St. Paul	Roseville, Minnesota	Active	
Xi Omicron		Nebraska Wesleyan University	Lincoln, Nebraska	Active	
Xi Pi		University of Jamestown	Jamestown, North Dakota	Active	
Xi Sigma		Emporia State University	Emporia, Kansas	Active	
Xi Tau		Western New England University	Springfield, Massachusetts	Active	
Xi Upsilon		Rochester Institute of Technology	Rochester, New York	Active	
Xi Phi		Wittenberg University	Springfield, Ohio	Active	
Xi Chi		College of Charleston	Charleston, South Carolina	Active	
Xi Psi	2002	Lindsey Wilson University	Columbia, Kentucky	Active	
Xi Omega		Commonwealth University-Bloomsburg	Bloomsburg, Pennsylvania	Active	
Omicron Gamma		California State University, San Bernardino	San Bernardino, California	Active	
Omicron Delta		Susquehanna University	Selinsgrove, Pennsylvania	Active	
Omicron Zeta	December 15, 2002	Auburn University	Auburn, Alabama	Active	
Omicron Eta		University of Miami	Coral Gables, Florida	Active	
Omicron Theta		Seton Hall University	South Orange, New Jersey	Active	
Omicron Iota		Niagara University	Lewiston, New York	Active	
Omicron Kappa		University of Iowa	Iowa City, Iowa	Active	
Omicron Omicron		Prairie View A&M University	Prairie View, Texas	Active	
Omicron Pi		University of Wyoming	Laramie, Wyoming	Active	
Omicron Sigma	2003	Berea College	Berea, Kentucky	Active	
Omicron Tau		Elmhurst University	Elmhurst, Illinois	Active	
Omicron Phi		California State University, San Marcos	San Marcos, California	Active	
Omicron Psi	2005	University of Pittsburgh	Pittsburgh, Pennsylvania	Active	
Pi Beta		San Diego State University	San Diego, California	Active	
Pi Delta		Southwestern University	Georgetown, Texas	Active	
Pi Epsilon		Hillsdale College	Hillsdale, Michigan	Active	
Pi Eta		University of North Carolina Wilmington	Wilmington, North Carolina	Active	
Pi Theta		Northwestern University	Evanston, Illinois	Active	
Pi Iota		Aurora University	Aurora, Illinois	Active	
Pi Kappa		Concordia College	Moorhead, Minnesota	Active	
Pi Mu		University of Houston–Downtown	Houston, Texas	Active	
Pi Nu		Palm Beach Atlantic University	West Palm Beach, Florida	Active	
Pi Xi		University of California, Santa Barbara	Santa Barbara, California	Active	
Pi Pi		Western Illinois University	Macomb, Illinois	Active	
Pi Rho		Penn State York	Spring Garden Township, Pennsylvania	Active	
Pi Sigma		Pepperdine University	Los Angeles County, California	Active	
Pi Tau		Northern Kentucky University	Highland Heights, Kentucky	Active	
Pi Upsilon		Vanguard University	Costa Mesa, California	Active	
Pi Phi		Grove City College	Grove City, Pennsylvania	Active	
Pi Chi		Central Washington University	Ellensburg, Washington	Active	
Pi Psi		Trinity Washington University	Washington, D.C.	Active	
Pi Omega		Plymouth State University	Plymouth, New Hampshire	Active	
Rho Alpha		University of Delaware	Newark, Delaware	Active	
Rho Beta		Murray State University	Murray, Kentucky	Active	
Rho Delta		Commonwealth University-Lock Haven	Lock Haven, Pennsylvania	Active	
Rho Epsilon		Mount St. Mary's University	Emmitsburg, Maryland	Active	
Rho Zeta		University of Alabama in Huntsville	Huntsville, Alabama	Active	
Rho Eta		State University of New York at Oneonta	Oneonta, New York	Active	
Rho Theta		University of Northern Colorado	Greeley, Colorado	Active	
Rho Nu	200x ?–2020; 2023	Western Kentucky University	Bowling Green, Kentucky	Active	
Rho Xi		University of Virginia's College at Wise	Wise, Virginia	Active	
Rho Sigma		North Greenville University	Tigerville, South Carolina	Active	
Rho Tau		Marywood University	Scranton, Pennsylvania	Active	
Rho Upsilon		Minnesota State University Moorhead	Moorhead, Minnesota	Active	
Rho Phi		Ramapo College	Mahwah, New Jersey	Active	
Rho Chi	2004	University of Missouri–St. Louis	St. Louis, Missouri	Active	
Sigma Delta		Valparaiso University	Valparaiso, Indiana	Active	
Sigma Epsilon		California State University, Fresno	Fresno, California	Active	
Sigma Zeta		Dominican University	River Forest, Illinois	Active	
Sigma Eta		University of Central Florida	Orlando, Florida	Active	
Sigma Kappa	2004	Christopher Newport University	Newport News, Virginia	Active	
Sigma Lambda		University of Illinois Springfield	Springfield, Illinois	Active	
Sigma Nu		Georgia College & State University	Milledgeville, Georgia	Active	
Sigma Xi		Mississippi College	Clinton, Mississippi	Active	
Sigma Omicron		Hamilton College	Kirkland, New York	Active	
Sigma Pi		State University of New York at Oswego	Oswego, New York	Active	
Sigma Upsilon		Campbell University	Buies Creek, North Carolina	Active	
Sigma Phi		California State University, Los Angeles	Los Angeles, California	Active	
Sigma Omega		Salem State University	Salem, Massachusetts	Active	
Tau Delta		Quinnipiac University	Hamden, Connecticut	Active	
Tau Gamma		University of Bridgeport	Bridgeport, Connecticut	Active	
Tau Epsilon		California State University, Fullerton	Fullerton, California	Active	
Tau Zeta		University of Toledo	Toledo, Ohio	Active	
Tau Eta		Allegheny College	Meadville, Pennsylvania	Active	
Tau Theta		Ithaca College	Ithaca, New York	Active	
Tau Iota		Mount Mary University	Milwaukee, Wisconsin	Active	
Tau Mu	2012	Central Connecticut State University	New Britain, Connecticut	Active	
Tau Nu	2005	Eastern Connecticut State University	Willimantic, Connecticut	Active	
Tau Pi		Lewis & Clark College	Portland, Oregon	Active	
Tau Tau		Biola University	La Mirada, California	Active	
Tau Phi		Stephen F. Austin State University	Nacogdoches, Texas	Active	
Tau Psi		Gordon College	Wenham, Massachusetts	Active	
Upsilon Epsilon		Wayland Baptist University	Plainview, Texas	Active	
Upsilon Zeta		Nova Southeastern University	Fort Lauderdale, Florida	Active	
Upsilon Eta		Coastal Carolina University	Conway, South Carolina	Active	
Upsilon Theta		Weber State University	Ogden, Utah	Active	
Upsilon Kappa		Ball State University	Muncie, Indiana	Active	
Upsilon Lambda		Waynesburg University	Waynesburg, Pennsylvania	Active	
Upsilon Mu		Colby–Sawyer College	New London, New Hampshire	Active	
Upsilon Nu		Saint Vincent College	Latrobe, Pennsylvania	Active	
Upsilon Xi		Florida Institute of Technology	Melbourne, Florida	Active	
Upsilon Omicron		University of Illinois Chicago	Chicago, Illinois	Active	
Upsilon Pi		University of Wisconsin–Milwaukee	Milwaukee, Wisconsin	Active	
Upsilon Sigma		Bowie State University	Bowie, Maryland	Active	
Upsilon Tau		Louisiana State University of Alexandria	Alexandria, Louisiana	Active	
Upsilon Upsilon		California Lutheran University	Thousand Oaks, California	Active	
Upsilon Phi		Loyola Marymount University	Los Angeles, California	Active	
Upsilon Psi		Woodbury University	Burbank, California	Active	
Upsilon Omega		Fairleigh Dickinson University, Teaneck Campus	Teaneck, New Jersey	Active	
Phi Delta		Chestnut Hill College	Philadelphia, Pennsylvania	Active	
Phi Zeta		Columbia College	Columbia, Missouri	Active	
Phi Eta		Temple University	Philadelphia, Pennsylvania	Active	
Phi Theta		California State Polytechnic University, Pomona	Pomona, California	Active	
Phi Kappa		University of Montana	Missoula, Montana	Active	
Phi Nu		St. Francis College	Brooklyn, New York	Active	
Phi Omicron		Flagler College	St. Augustine, Florida	Active	
Phi Pi		Mount Saint Mary College	Newburgh, New York	Active	
Phi Upsilon		Frostburg State University	Frostburg, Maryland	Active	
Phi Phi		Augustana University	Sioux Falls, South Dakota	Active	
Phi Chi		University of New Hampshire	Durham, New Hampshire	Active	
Phi Psi		Liberty University	Lynchburg, Virginia	Active	
Phi Omega		Hastings College	Hastings, Nebraska	Active	
Chi Alpha		Regent University	Virginia Beach, Virginia	Active	
Chi Beta		University of Missouri	Columbia, Missouri	Active	
Chi Rho		Wheeling University	Wheeling, West Virginia	Active	
Chi Tau		Simmons University	Boston, Massachusetts	Active	
Chi Upsilon		Utah Tech University	St. George, Utah	Active	(Note: Chapter formed at Dixie State University, now called Utah Tech University.)
Chi Phi		Lycoming College	Williamsport, Pennsylvania	Active	
Chi Chi		Carthage College	Kenosha, Wisconsin	Active	
Psi Beta	2008	Manhattan University	Bronx, New York City, New York	Active	
Psi Gamma	2008	Belmont University	Nashville, Tennessee	Active	
Psi Delta		Spring Hill College	Mobile, Alabama	Active	
Psi Epsilon		King's College	Wilkes-Barre, Pennsylvania	Active	
Psi Zeta		Lynn University	Boca Raton, Florida	Active	
Psi Eta		Queens University of Charlotte	Charlotte, North Carolina	Active	
Psi Theta		Saint Louis University	St. Louis, Missouri	Active	
Psi Kappa		Louisiana State University-Shreveport	Shreveport, Louisiana	Active	
Psi Lambda		Central Methodist University	Fayette, Missouri	Active	
Psi Nu		University of Alabama at Birmingham	Birmingham, Alabama	Active	
Psi Pi		York College of Pennsylvania	Spring Garden Township, Pennsylvania	Active	
Psi Rho		University of Nebraska Omaha	Omaha, Nebraska	Active	
Psi Phi		Neumann University	Aston Township, Pennsylvania	Active	
Psi Omega		Purdue University Fort Wayne	Fort Wayne, Indiana	Active	
Omega Alpha		California State University, Channel Islands	Camarillo, California	Active	
Omega Beta		Merrimack College	North Andover, Massachusetts	Active	
Omega Delta		Northern Arizona University	Flagstaff, Arizona	Active	
Omega Zeta		Augsburg University	Minneapolis, Minnesota	Active	
Omega Iota		Florida Southern College	Lakeland, Florida	Active	
Omega Kappa		North Central College	Naperville, Illinois	Active	
Omega Nu		Georgian Court University	Lakewood Township, New Jersey	Active	
Omega Omicron		Colorado Christian University	Lakewood, Colorado	Active	
Omega Tau		Young Harris College	Young Harris, Georgia	Active	
Omega Upsilon		University of Hawaiʻi at Mānoa	Honolulu, Hawaii	Active	
Omega Psi	2011	Worcester State University	Worcester, Massachusetts	Active	
Omega Omega	2012	Boise State University	Boise, Idaho	Active	
Alpha Alpha Alpha		University of South Carolina Upstate	Valley Falls, South Carolina	Active	
Alpha Alpha Beta		Dominican University of California	San Rafael, California	Active	
Alpha Alpha Delta		State University of New York at New Paltz	New Paltz, New York	Active	
Alpha Alpha Epsilon		Stevenson University	Owings Mills, Maryland	Active	
Alpha Alpha Zeta	2008	University of Illinois at Urbana-Champaign	Urbana, Illinois	Active	
Alpha Alpha Eta		Carroll College	Helena, Montana	Active	
Alpha Alpha Iota		Penn State Altoona	Logan Township, Pennsylvania	Active	
Alpha Alpha Mu		Texas Christian University	Fort Worth, Texas	Active	
Alpha Alpha Nu		Nazareth College		Active	
Alpha Alpha Xi		Augusta University	Augusta, Georgia	Active	
Alpha Alpha Pi		South Dakota State University	Brookings, South Dakota	Active	
Alpha Alpha Rho		Ashland University	Ashland, Ohio	Active	
Alpha Alpha Chi		Trinity International University	Bannockburn, Illinois	Active	
Alpha Alpha Psi		College of The Ozarks	Point Lookout, Missouri	Active	
Alpha Beta Gamma	2012	Roanoke College	Salem, Virginia	Active	
Alpha Beta Delta		Albion College	Albion, Michigan	Active	
Alpha Beta Epsilon		State University of New York at Fredonia	Fredonia, New York	Active	
Alpha Beta Zeta		Franklin Pierce University	Rindge, New Hampshire	Active	
Alpha Beta Eta		University of Guam	Mangilao, Guam	Active	
Alpha Beta Theta		Oregon State University	Corvallis, Oregon	Active	
Alpha Beta Kappa		Louisiana State University	Baton Rouge, Louisiana	Active	
Alpha Beta Mu		Randolph–Macon College	Ashland, Virginia	Active	
Alpha Beta Omicron		Notre Dame de Namur University	Belmont, California	Active	
Alpha Beta Pi		Penn State Lehigh Valley	Center Valley, Pennsylvania	Active	
Alpha Beta Sigma		Grand Canyon University	Phoenix, Arizona	Active	
Alpha Beta Upsilon	2012	Temple University	Philadelphia, Pennsylvania	Active	
Alpha Beta Chi		Northwest University	Kirkland, Washington	Active	
Alpha Gamma Alpha		Northeastern University	Boston, Massachusetts	Active	
Alpha Gamma Beta		Cazenovia College	Cazenovia, New York	Active	
Alpha Gamma Delta		Caldwell University	Caldwell, New Jersey	Active	
Alpha Gamma Zeta		Xavier University	Cincinnati, Ohio	Active	
Alpha Gamma Kappa		University of the Incarnate Word	San Antonio, Texas	Active	
Alpha Gamma Lambda		Middle Tennessee State University	Murfreesboro, Tennessee	Active	
Alpha Gamma Nu	2014	Wabash College	Crawfordsville, Indiana	Active	
Alpha Gamma Rho		Roger Williams University	Bristol, Rhode Island	Active	
Alpha Gamma Upsilon		Virginia Tech	Blacksburg, Virginia	Active	
Alpha Gamma Phi		Dominican University New York	Orangeburg, New York	Active	
Alpha Gamma Chi		Gardner–Webb University	Boiling Springs, North Carolina	Active	
Alpha Delta Beta		Blackburn College	Carlinville, Illinois	Active	
Alpha Delta Gamma		Saint Peter's University	Jersey City, New Jersey	Active	
Alpha Delta Zeta		Sacred Heart University	Fairfield, Connecticut	Active	
Alpha Delta Theta		Texas Southern University	Houston, Texas	Active	
Alpha Delta Iota		Adrian College	Adrian, Michigan	Active	
Alpha Delta Lambda		Geneva College	Beaver Falls, Pennsylvania	Active	
Alpha Delta Xi		University of North Georgia, Gainesville	Oakwood, Georgia	Active	
Alpha Delta Rho		Concordia University		Active	
Alpha Delta Sigma	2016	University of South Carolina Beaufort	Bluffton, South Carolina	Active	
Alpha Delta Tau		Bellevue University	Bellevue, Nebraska	Active	
Alpha Delta Phi		Washington & Jefferson College	Washington, Pennsylvania	Active	
Alpha Delta Chi		University of St. Francis	Joliet, Illinois	Active	
Alpha Delta Psi		Farmingdale State College	East Farmingdale, New York	Active	
Alpha Delta Omega		University of Mary Washington	Fredericksburg, Virginia	Active	
Alpha Epsilon Alpha		Schreiner University	Kerrville, Texas	Active	
Alpha Epsilon Beta		American University of Kuwait	Salmiya, Kuwait	Active	
Alpha Epsilon Delta		University of Connecticut	Storrs, Connecticut	Active	
Alpha Epsilon Epsilon		University of Denver	Denver, Colorado	Active	
Alpha Epsilon Eta		Champlain College	Burlington, Vermont	Active	
Alpha Epsilon Kappa		Park University	Parkville, Missouri	Active	
Alpha Epsilon Lambda	2018	Penn State Schuylkill	Schuylkill Haven, Pennsylvania	Active	
Alpha Epsilon Mu		Willamette University	Salem, Oregon	Active	
Alpha Epsilon Nu		Tuskegee University	Tuskegee, Alabama	Active	
Alpha Epsilon Omicron		SUNY Brockport	Brockport, New York	Active	
Alpha Epsilon Rho				Active	
Alpha Epsilon Sigma		Texas A&M University–Kingsville	Kingsville, Texas	Active	
Alpha Epsilon Tau		Manhattanville University	Purchase, New York	Active	
Alpha Epsilon Upsilon		University of North Florida	Jacksonville, Florida	Active	
Alpha Epsilon Phi		Penn State Scranton	Dunmore, Pennsylvania	Active	
Alpha Epsilon Chi		University of Texas at Dallas	Richardson, Texas	Active	
Alpha Epsilon Psi	2019	Concordia University Chicago	River Forest, Illinois	Active	
Alpha Epsilon Omega		University of Texas at Arlington	Arlington, Texas	Active	
Alpha Zeta Beta		Florida State University Panama City	Panama City, Florida	Active	
Alpha Zeta Gamma		American University in the Emirates	Dubai International Academic City, Dubai, United Arab Emirates	Active	
Alpha Zeta Delta		The Media School at Indiana University	Bloomington, Indiana	Active	
Alpha Zeta Eta	April 2020	Iowa State University	Ames, Iowa	Active	
Alpha Zeta Theta		Fayetteville State University	Fayetteville, North Carolina	Active	
Alpha Chi Alpha		Alcorn State University	Lorman, Mississippi	Active	
Alpha Chi Gamma		Eckerd College	St. Petersburg, Florida	Active	
Alpha Chi Delta		Lamar University	Beaumont, Texas	Active	
Alpha Chi Epsilon		Millsaps College	Jackson, Mississippi	Active	
Alpha Chi Zeta		Oral Roberts University	Tulsa, Oklahoma	Active	
Alpha Chi Eta		Northern State University	Aberdeen, South Dakota	Active	
Alpha Chi Iota		Indiana University Kokomo	Kokomo, Indiana	Active	
Alpha Chi Mu		Hofstra University	Hempstead, New York	Active	
Alpha Chi Nu		University of West Alabama	Livingston, Alabama	Active	
Alpha Chi Omicron		Marymount University	Arlington County, Virginia	Active	
Alpha Chi Sigma		Wilmington University	New Castle, Delaware	Active	
Alpha Chi Tau		Seattle Pacific University	Seattle, Washington	Active	
Alpha Chi Upsilon		Auburn University at Montgomery	Montgomery, Alabama	Active	
Alpha Chi Phi		Whitman College	Walla Walla, Washington	Active	
Alpha Chi Omega		University of Arizona	Tucson, Arizona	Active	
Beta Alpha Delta		Rogers State University	Claremore, Oklahoma	Active	
Kappa Lambda Rho	2005	Quincy University	Quincy, Illinois	Active	
