= University of South Carolina System =

State university system

- Type: State university system
- Established: 1957; 69 years ago
- Endowment: $788.3 million (2019)
- President: Michael Amiridis
- Faculty: 3,191 (Fall 2006)
- Students: 52,633 (Fall 2019)
- Location: Columbia, South Carolina, USA
- Campus: 8 campuses
- Expenditures: US $1,354,416,154 (FY 2014)
- Website: southcarolina.edu

The University of South Carolina System is a state university system collection of campuses established in 1957 to expand the educational opportunities of the citizens of South Carolina as well as extend the reach of the University of South Carolina (USC) throughout the state. With over 52,000 students at the eight campuses, the system is the largest institution of higher learning in the state of South Carolina.

The system includes the flagship research campus in Columbia, South Carolina, three senior campuses, and four regional campuses. USC has several thousand future students in feeder programs at surrounding technical colleges.

== Campuses ==
The University of South Carolina System currently consists of eight campuses with a flagship campus at Columbia. The campuses in Aiken, Beaufort and Spartanburg are Comprehensive campuses and offer both undergraduate and graduate degrees. The four Palmetto Colleges are regional campuses and offer associate's degree as well as providing a straightforward process to transfer to one of the senior campuses through the university's on-line Palmetto College.

Four of the campuses have branches in nearby locales. USC Beaufort has a branch in Bluffton, USC Union has a branch in Laurens, USC Salkehatchie has its main campus in Allendale with a branch in Walterboro, and USC Upstate has a branch in Greenville.

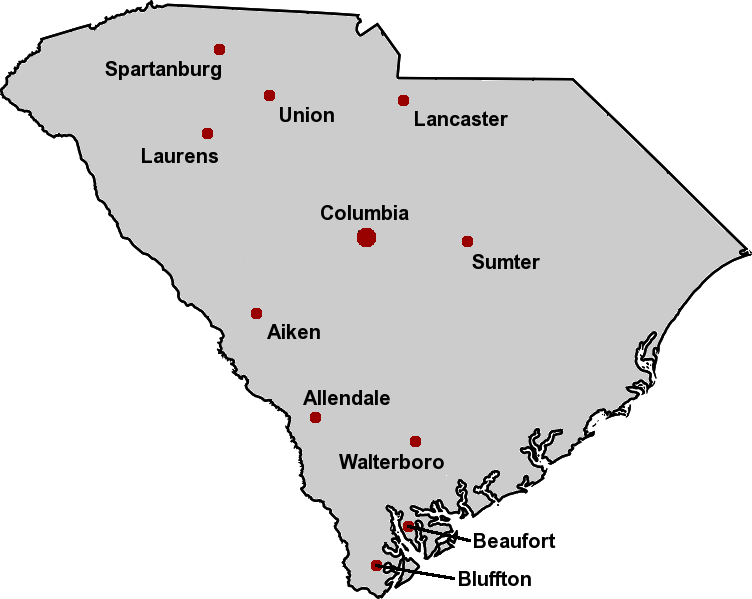
Map of University of South Carolina Locations.

Campus	Location (Note: All cities are located within the State of South Carolina.)	Type	Founded	Enrollment (Fall 2019)	Expenditures (2014)	Athletics nickname	Athletic category	Primary athletic conference
USC Columbia	Columbia	Flagship/Research	1801	35,364	1,119,185,005	Gamecocks	NCAA Division I	Southeastern (SEC)
USC Upstate	Spartanburg	Comprehensive	1967	6,307	98,425,124	Spartans	NCAA Division I	Big South
USC Aiken	Aiken	Comprehensive	1961	3,726	60,064,394	Pacers	NCAA Division II	Peach Belt (PBC)
USC Beaufort	Beaufort	Comprehensive	1959	2,119	28,755,019	Sand Sharks	NCAA Division II	Peach Belt (PBC)
USC Lancaster	Lancaster	Palmetto College	1959	1,640	17,702,296	Lancers	NJCAA	Carolinas (CJCC) (Region X)
USC Sumter	Sumter	Palmetto College	1966	1,360	11,433,437	Fire Ants	NJCAA	Carolinas (CJCC) (Region X)
USC Union	Union	Palmetto College	1965	1,153	6,371,444	Bantams (Note: USC Union began intercollegiate athletics since the 2018-19 school year.)	NJCAA	Carolinas (CJCC) (Region X)
USC Salkehatchie	Allendale	Palmetto College	1965	964	12,479,435	Indians	NJCAA	Carolinas (CJCC) (Region X)

=== Former campuses ===
- USC Florence, a campus from 1957 until it became independent on July 1, 1970 as Francis Marion College (now Francis Marion University).
- USC Coastal Carolina, a previously independent two-year campus, joined the USC System in 1959 and remained until it became independent on July 1, 1993 as Coastal Carolina University.

== Governance ==
The University of South Carolina System is governed by the Board of Trustees which oversees the overall management of the system. The Board of Trustees is composed of a total of 20 members. Of the members, 16 are chosen by the General Assembly, three are ex officio members, and one is appointed by the Governor of South Carolina.

A President is appointed by the board to serve as the chief executive officer of the system and to manage with the day-to-day affairs of the campuses. In addition, the President is tasked with long-range planning of the system and recommending improvements to the Board of Trustees. Each senior campus is administered by a chancellor and each regional campus is managed by a dean, all of whom report directly to the president. The duties of the chancellor at the Columbia campus are encompassed by the office of the president.

Both the Board of the Trustees and the president have offices in the Osborne Administration Building, at the northeast corner of The Horseshoe. The Board of Trustees meets every other month and the president delivers a yearly state-of-the-university address in the Longstreet Theater.

== Board of trustees ==
Note: This article was transferred from the University of South Carolina article which pertains only to the Columbia campus, since the Board of Trustees governs the whole system.

The Board of Trustees is a body created by the state of South Carolina responsible for the maintenance and operation of the university, including the University of South Carolina System. Its primary focus is to set the mission for the University system and to approve all financial decisions.

The board was established in the legislation passed by the General Assembly on December 19, 1801 for the foundation of South Carolina College. The original board was composed of twenty-five members, twelve of whom were ex officio and 13 were elected. They first met on February 12, 1802 at the home of Governor John Drayton. A quorum was not present so they met again on February 14 when they did have the necessary numbers for a quorum.

On May 7, 1970 about 500 students marched to the flagpole on the Horseshoe and demanded that the U.S. Flag be lowered to half staff to honor those who had died in the Kent State shootings. An equal size counter-protest gathered at the flagpole and demanded that flag remain hoisted at the top of the pole. To thwart off any potential bloodshed, President Tom Jones ordered that the flag be lowered. However, the protesters felt emboldened and took over the Russell House. The National Guard had to be called in to dislodge the students from the building and 42 students were arrested.

The board acted to discipline the students on May 11. A crowd of 300 students formed, marched on the administrative building where the trustees were meeting, and demanded amnesty for the students. The board refused and the protesters responded by vandalizing cars parked at the building. One car that was flipped over was bought the same day by a trustee. The protesters occupied the first floor of the building causing the trustees to huddle in a room on the second floor. After waiting a few hours in the room, Hugh Willcox, a trustee in his 70s, simply left the room, walked past the students, and sped away in his car. Sol Blatt, Jr. commented that he would not have done that for $100,000. The National Guard arrived later that night and the protesters dispersed at their sight. The inability of President Tom Jones to control the actions of the students led to the loss of support by the trustees and his eventual resignation in 1974.

=== Composition and powers ===
The Board of Trustees is composed of the following 20 members:

- Governor of South Carolina, ex officio Chairman of the Board; may appoint a designee in his/her stead
- South Carolina State Superintendent of Education, ex officio
- President of the Greater University of South Carolina Alumni Association, ex officio
- One member elected by the General Assembly from each of the sixteen judicial circuits
- One member appointed by the governor

The governor's appointee and those elected by the General Assembly serve for a term of four years.

Seven standing committees have been set up to streamline the business of the board of trustees. A special or ad hoc committee can be formed by the Chairman of the Board should a need arise. The following are the seven standing committees:

- Executive Committee
- Buildings and Grounds Committee
- Intercollegiate Activities Committee
- Academic Affairs and Faculty-Liaison Committee
- Student-Trustee Liaison Committee
- Health Affairs Committee
- Fiscal Policy Committee

Up until 1981, the positions of head football coach and athletic director were combined. Despite being the athletic director, the head football coach held little sway over the hiring and firing of the coaches for the other athletic programs. The true power lay with the chairman of the athletic committee and the position was dominated from the 1930s to the 1970s by Solomon Blatt, Sr. and his son Solomon Blatt, Jr. Yet in 1966 Blatt, Jr. was trumped when he had lined up Bill Murray to become the head football coach and Governor Robert Evander McNair had instead convinced Paul Dietzel to accept the position.

The trustees have the final say on all affairs that are pertinent to the University. Their powers include:

- Awarding of honorary degrees
- Purchasing, leasing and selling property of the University
- Setting tuition fees
- Hiring and firing faculty and personnel

Additionally, according to the Code of Laws of South Carolina (1976), Section 59-117-100, the board of trustees are tasked with ensuring that the president of the university is not an atheist or an infidel.
