= Palmetto College =

University of South Carolina Palmetto College ("USC Palmetto College" or "Palmetto College") is a division of the University of South Carolina System that serves students across the state of South Carolina through regional campuses and online degree completion programs. Launched in 2013, Palmetto College comprises four regional two-year campuses––USC Lancaster, USC Salkehatchie, USC Sumter, and USC Union––as well as an online completion program that partners with the system's four-year institutions.

The college's mission focuses on making higher education accessible, affordable, flexible, and achievable for South Carolinians, particularly those in rural and underserved areas. It serves more than 8,000 students annually.

== History and Structure ==
Palmetto College was established to extend the reach of the USC System, which includes eight institutions and 20 locations throughout the state. It was funded by a $5M appropriation by the South Carolina General Assembly in 2012. In January 2013, Susan Elkins was named the first chancellor. Palmetto College officially started enrolling students on April 18, 2013. The online degree completion component launched in Fall 2013 with seven initial programs, designed to allow students to earn a baccalaureate degree without leaving their local communities. Since its inception, the number of online degree programs has grown to 29 as of December 2024. Craig Wilson was named Chancellor on June 11, 2025.

The college is structured around five primary units:

- Four regional campuses (USC Lancaster, USC Salkehatchie, USC Sumter, USC Union).
- An academic unit housed on USC's Columbia campus.

=== Campuses ===
The four regional Palmetto College campuses primarily offer associate degrees and serve as entry points for students intending to transfer to four-year institutions. Each campus also hosts specific bachelor's degree programs through partnerships with other USC institutions. The college centralizes the management of the regional campuses, which have served their respective communities for decades:

==== USC Lancaster ====
Founded 1959. Located in the Piedmont region with campuses in Lancaster and Indian Land, USC Lancaster is home to the Native American Studies Center. For 2025, Niche ranked it the No. 1 "Best Two-Year College in South Carolina" for the eighth consecutive year.

==== USC Salkehatchie ====
Founded in 1965. Serving the Lowcountry with campuses in Allendale and Walterboro, USC Salkehatchie hosts "Leadership Salkehatchie," a regional economic development program. In 2025, it was ranked the No. 3 "Best Two-Year College in South Carolina" by Niche.

==== USC Sumter ====
Founded in 1966. Located in the Midlands, USC Sumter operates a campus in Sumter and offers programs at nearby Shaw Air Force Base. The campus is notable for its esports program, which has won multiple NJCAAE championships. It was ranked the No. 2 "Best Two-Year College in South Carolina" by Niche in 2025.

==== USC Union ====
Founded in 1965. Situated in the Upstate region with campuses in Union and Clinton (Laurens County), USC Union emphasizes early college programs for high school students, particularly in nursing and education. It was ranked the No. 5 "Best Two-Year College in South Carolina" by Niche in 2025.

==== Palmetto Programs ====
Palmetto Programs is a department on the main University of South Carolina campus. It manages the Palmetto Pathway program, a one-year residential bridge program that allows students to live and learn on USC's Columbia campus while completing their first year of coursework. Upon completion, eligible students transfer to sophomore status at USC Columbia. The department offers two degree programs: (1) a Bachelor of Arts in Liberal Studies and (2) a Bachelor of Arts in Organizational Leadership.

== Academics ==
Palmetto College offers three primary academic pathways: associate degrees, online bachelor's degree completion, and dual enrollment for high school students.

=== Associate Degrees ===
The regional campuses offer on-campus and online Associate of Arts and Associate of Science degrees. Students may focus their coursework in areas such as business and criminal justice.

=== Online Bachelor's Completion ===
Through Palmetto College Online, students who have completed 60 credit hours (typically an associate degree) can complete a bachelor's degree online. The degrees are awarded by one of the USC System's four-year institutions: USC Aiken, USC Beaufort, USC Columbia, or USC Upstate.

As of December 2024, the college offers 29 online bachelor's degree completion options across six career-interest areas:

- Business and Leadership
- Communications
- Data Management
- Education
- Healthcare and Helping Professions
- Public Service

=== Dual Enrollment ===
The regional campuses maintain partnerships with local school districts to offer dual enrollment courses, allowing high school students to earn college credit that counts toward both high school graduation and university requirements.

=== Athletics ===
Student-athletes at Palmetto College campuses compete primarily in Region 10 of the National Junior College Athletic Association (NJCAA). The campuses offer 11 distinct NJCAA sports programs. Recent achievements include the 2024 NJCAA Division I Region 10 Championship for the USC Salkehatchie Men's Basketball team and the Region 10 Championship for the USC Lancaster Women's Soccer team. Additionally, several campuses participate in collegiate esports through the NJCAAE.

=== Student Demographics and Impact ===
Palmetto College serves a diverse student body, with 30% of students identifying as underrepresented minorities and 55% coming from low-income households (Pell Grant eligible). 92% of students at the regional campuses are South Carolina residents. The college plays a significant role in workforce development, with 95% of alumni remaining in South Carolina after graduation. Since 2013, over 1,000 students have earned Bachelor of Science in nursing (BSN) degrees through the college's programs, helping to address the state's nursing shortage.

=== Community Outreach ===
Palmetto College operates the Palmetto College AI Innovation Lab Network (formerly the Palmetto College iCarolina Lab Network), which provides free broadband internet access and workforce development training in rural areas. As of January 2026, the network includes nine labs located on the Palmetto College campuses, at Fort Jackson, and in partnership with public libraries in Clinton, Kershaw, and Laurens. These labs offer certification programs utilizing Apple products and software.
