= Kimberly Ritchie =

American marine biologist

Kimberly B. Ritchie
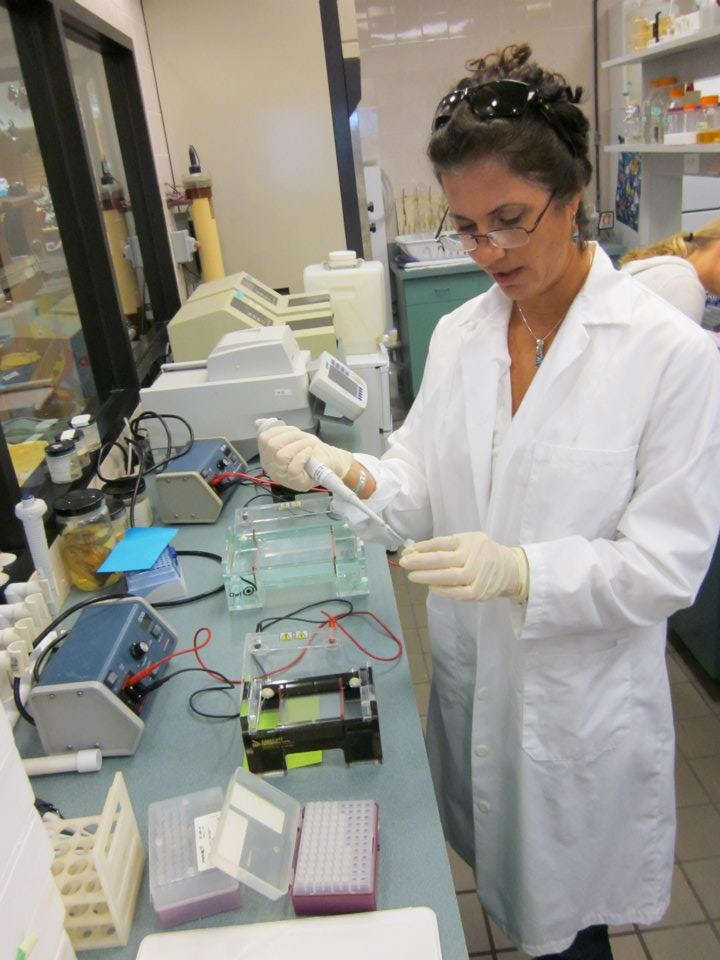
- Education: University of South Carolina Aiken; University of North Carolina at Chapel Hill
- Scientific career
- Fields: Marine Biology
- Workplaces: University of South Carolina Beaufort

Kimberly B. Ritchie is an American marine biologist. She is an associate professor in the Department of Natural Sciences at the University of South Carolina Beaufort. Her research is focused on marine microbiology and how microbes affect animal health in hosts such as corals and sharks.

== Early years and education ==
Ritchie was born in Aiken, South Carolina in 1962. She is the daughter of Robert E. and Frances M. Beach. Her father was a forester and her mother was a high school teacher. She grew up on a farm in Walterboro, South Carolina and graduated from Walterboro High School. Ritchie obtained a B.S. in biology from the University of South Carolina Aiken in 1994 and a Ph.D. in genetics from the University of North Carolina Chapel Hill in 2000. She was a postdoctoral fellow at the Smithsonian Tropical Research Institute in the Republic of Panama in the summer of 2000 and a postdoctoral scientist at the Scripps Institution of Oceanography at the University of California, San Diego until 2001.

== Early career ==
After finishing her postdoctoral training, Ritchie worked as a senior scientist (2001–2004) in drug discovery in the Marine Microbiology Division at MicroGenomics, Inc., in Carlsbad, California. She then became a staff scientist (2004–2008) and subsequently a senior scientist (2008–2016) at Mote Marine Laboratory, where she was the manager of the Marine Microbiology Program, focusing broadly on coral reef ecology, microbial ecology, marine diseases, beneficial microbial associates of marine organisms and drug discovery. In 2016, Ritchie was recruited to the University of South Carolina Beaufort where she is an associate professor of genetics and prokaryotic cell biology

== Research ==
Ritchie is a pioneer in uncovering the importance of microbes in coral holobionts. She was a leader in studying the microbiology of coral diseases as they increased in abundance in the Caribbean and worldwide at a time when very little work was done on coral microbiology. She identified pathogens that caused coral diseases such as Aspergillosis, White Pox, and White Plague. She later examined the role of potentially beneficial bacteria in coral health.[3] Using a novel selection screen, she was the first to show that healthy corals harbor bacteria that produce antibiotics and that these bacteria are replaced with potentially pathogenic marine bacteria when temperatures increase on coral reefs. This beneficial role of antibiotic production helps regulate the balance of the coral microbiome and provides a first line of defense for corals against marine pathogens. Her subsequent work assigned roles for coral beneficial bacteria in cell-cell-signal mediated regulation of coral pathogens and suggested a role for beneficial bacteria in probiotic therapies. Her work has also included research on shark microbiomes and beneficial roles of bacterial associates on elasmobranch (shark, skate and ray) epidermal surfaces

== Mentorship ==
During her years at Mote Marine Laboratory, Ritchie led a popular NSF REU summer research program in estuarine and coastal sciences. At USCB, she teaches Coral Reef Ecology, Marine Policy and Marine Microbiology and continues to mentor undergraduate students in marine microbial research.

== Awards and professional service ==
- National Academy of Sciences Kavli Fellow, 2015
- Smithsonian Postdoctoral Fellowship, 2000
- Editorial board, Coral Reefs, 2014 to present
- Editorial board, Frontiers in Microbiology, 2015 to present
- Editorial board, Frontiers in Marine Science, 2016 to present
- Guest associate editor, Frontiers in Ecology and Evolution, 2018 to present
- Review editor, Microbial Symbioses, 2016 to present
- Florida Keys Water Quality Advisory Committee, 2007-2018
- Acropora Recovery Team Member for the Endangered Species Act (ESA) Listing of the threatened elkhorn coral, Acropora palmata, National Marine Fisheries Service

== Selected publications ==
- Smith, GW, LD Ives, IA Nagelkerken and KB Ritchie (1996) Caribbean Sea-Fan Mortalities. Nature 383, 487 Caribbean sea-fan mortalities
- Richardson, LL, WM Goldberg, KG Kuta, RB Aronson, GW Smith, KB Ritchie, JC Halas, JS Feingold, SL Miller (1998) Florida's mystery coral-killer identified. Nature 392:557-558 Florida's mystery coral-killer identified
- Patterson, KL, JW Porter, KB Ritchie, GW Smith, SW Polson (2002). Etiology of white pox, a lethal disease of the Caribbean elkhorn coral, Acropora palmata. Proceedings of the National Academy of Sciences, USA 99(13): 8725-8730 The etiology of white pox, a lethal disease of the Caribbean elkhorn coral, Acropora palmata
- Ritchie, KB (2006) Regulation of marine microbes by coral mucus and mucus-associated bacteria. Marine Ecology Progress Series. 322: 1-14 https://www.int-res.com/abstracts/meps/v322/
- Eakin CM, Morgan JA, Heron SF, Smith TB, Liu G, et al. of 67 authors (2010) Caribbean Corals in Crisis: Record Thermal Stress, Bleaching, and Mortality in 2005. PLoS ONE 5(11): e13969. doi:10.1371/journal.pone.0013969
- McDaniel, LE, Young E, Delaney J, Ruhnau F., Ritchie KB, Paul JH (2010) High Frequency of Horizontal Gene Transfer in the Oceans. Science 330, 50 DOI: 10.1126/science.1192243
