= Carolinas Junior College Conference =

Junior college athletic conference

- Association: NJCAA
- Founded: 1978
- Sports fielded: 18 (10 men's, 8 women's)
- Division: Region 10
- No. of teams: 36
- Headquarters: Charlotte, North Carolina
- Region: East (North Carolina, South Carolina, Virginia)

The Carolinas Junior College Conference (CJCC) is a component of the National Junior College Athletic Association (NJCAA), in which it is also known as Region 10. Teams represent various junior colleges, technical colleges, and community colleges. Conference championships are held in most sports and individuals can be named to All-Conference and All-Academic teams.

== Member schools ==
=== Current members ===
The CJCAC currently has 36 full members, all but three are public schools:

Institution	Location	Founded	Affiliation	Enrollment	Nickname	Joined
Brunswick Community College	Bolivia, North Carolina	1979	Public (Note: Part of the North Carolina Community College System.)	1,678	Dolphins	?
Bryant & Stratton College–Virginia Campus	Hampton, Virginia & Virginia Beach, Virginia	1854	For-profit	8,000	Bobcats	2018
Caldwell Community College & Technical Institute	Hudson, North Carolina	1964	Public	3,703	Cobras	?
Cape Fear Community College	Wilmington, North Carolina	1958	Public	14,170	Sea Devils	?
Catawba Valley Community College	Hickory, North Carolina	1958	Public	4,172	Red Hawks	?
Central Carolina Community College	Sanford, North Carolina	1961	Public	5,231	Cougars	?
Cleveland Community College	Shelby, North Carolina	1965	Public	1,946	Yetis	?
Davidson-Davie Community College	Lexington, North Carolina	1958	Public	3,921	Storm	?
Denmark Technical College	Denmark, South Carolina	1947	Public (Note: Part of the South Carolina Technical College System.)	725	Panthers	?
Fayetteville Technical Community College	Fayetteville, North Carolina	1961	Public	10,233	Trojans	?
Florence–Darlington Technical College	Florence, South Carolina	1963	Public	2,940	Stingers	?
Gaston College	Dallas, North Carolina	1963	Public	5,558	Rhinos	?
Guilford Technical Community College	Jamestown, North Carolina	1958	Public	10,067	Titans	?
Johnston Community College	Smithfield, North Carolina	1969	Public	4,282	Jaguars	?
Lenoir Community College	Kinston, North Carolina	1958	Public	2,199	Lancers	?
Louisburg College	Louisburg, North Carolina	1787	Methodist	434	Hurricanes	?
Mayland Community College	Spruce Pine, North Carolina	1970	Public	783	Highlanders	2023
Mountain Gateway Community College	Clifton Forge, Virginia	1962	Public (Note: Part of the Virginia Community College System.)	946	Roadrunners	?
Northeastern Technical College	Cheraw, South Carolina	1969	Public	1,466	Trailblazers	?
Patrick & Henry Community College	Martinsville, Virginia	1962	Public	1,861	Patriots	?
Paul D. Camp Community College	Franklin, Virginia	1970	Public	1,188	Hurricanes	?
Pitt Community College	Winterville, North Carolina	1961	Public	7,144	Bulldogs	?
Richard Bland College	Prince George, Virginia	1960	Public (Note: Associated with the College of William & Mary.)	2,051	Statesmen	?
Rockingham Community College	Wentworth, North Carolina	1966	Public	1,712	Eagles	?
Sandhills Community College	Pinehurst, North Carolina	1963	Public	3,778	Flyers	?
Southeastern Community College at Whiteville	Whiteville, North Carolina	1964	Public	1,228	Rams	?
Southside Virginia Community College	Alberta, Virginia	1968	Public	3,112	Panthers	?
Southwest Virginia Community College	Cedar Bluff, Virginia	1968	Public	2,163	Flying Eagles	?
Surry Community College	Dobson, North Carolina	1964	Public	2,797	Knights	?
University of South Carolina Lancaster	Lancaster, South Carolina	1959	Public (Note: Part of the University of South Carolina System.)	1,772	Lancers	?
University of South Carolina Salkehatchie	Allendale, South Carolina	1965	Public	745	Indians	?
University of South Carolina Sumter	Sumter, South Carolina	1966	Public	1,537	Fire Ants	?
University of South Carolina Union	Union, South Carolina	1965	Public	1,098	Bantams	?
Vance–Granville Community College	Henderson, North Carolina	1969	Public	2,814	Vanguards	?
Virginia Peninsula Community College	Hampton, Virginia & Williamsburg, Virginia	1968	Public	6,018	Gators	?
Wake Technical Community College	Raleigh, North Carolina	1958	Public	21,551	Eagles	?

=== Former members ===
The CJCC had one former full member, a public school:

Institution	Location	Founded	Type	Enrollment	Nickname	Joined	Left	Subsequent conference(s)	Current conference
Spartanburg Methodist College	Saxon, South Carolina	1911	United; Methodist	1,064	Pioneers	?	2024	Continental (CAC) (Note: Currently an NAIA athletic conference.) (2024–present)	
