= Peach Belt Conference =

College athletic conference

- Association: NCAA
- Founded: 1990
- Commissioner: Diana Kling (since 2025)
- Sports fielded: 18; men's: 9; women's: 9
- Division: Division II
- No. of teams: 11
- Headquarters: Augusta, Georgia
- Region: Southeastern United States
- Website: peachbeltconference.org

Locations

The Peach Belt Conference (PBC) is a college athletic conference affiliated with the National Collegiate Athletic Association (NCAA) at the Division II level. The 11 member institutions are located in the South Atlantic states of South Carolina, Georgia, and Florida. In addition, seven affiliate members participate in one sport each; namely sports not sponsored by their home conferences.

Since its inception came in the 1990–91 school year, the Peach Belt has, across all sanctioned sports, produced 30 national champions and an additional 27 national finalists. Starting with only two championships in 1991, in men's and women's basketball, the conference has expanded to 18 championship sports with the addition of men's lacrosse in the summer of 2020 and men's and women's indoor track and field in 2023.

== History ==
Peach Belt Conference
Location of Peach Belt Conference members: full, departing, future

The conference traces its roots November 1988 when 11 schools first met in Greenville, S.C. to form a Division II conference. Following a second meeting on Dec. 3, 1989, five of those 11 schools, plus two others, formed the Peach Belt Athletic Conference and began play in the fall of 1990.

The seven charter members of the conference were Armstrong Atlantic State University (later Armstrong State University), Columbus State University, Francis Marion University, Georgia College (now Georgia College & State University), Lander University, USC Aiken, and USC Spartanburg (now USC Upstate). The name Peach Belt Athletic Conference was adopted in January 1990 and modified to Peach Belt Conference in May 2000.

Augusta State University joined the conference as the eighth member in 1991 and UNC Pembroke became the ninth member on July 1, 1992. They were followed by Kennesaw State University on July 1, 1994, Clayton State University on July 1, 1995 and the University of North Florida on July 1, 1997. Kennesaw State and North Florida departed for the Division I ranks in 2005, USC Upstate did the same in 2007, and the conference welcomed in North Georgia College & State University in 2005 and Georgia Southwestern State University in 2006. In 2009–10, the University of Montevallo and Flagler College were added, returning a league presence to Florida and breaking new ground in Alabama. In 2012–13, the Peach Belt expanded to 14 members, the most the league has ever had, with the addition of Young Harris College. On January 8, 2013, the University System of Georgia finalized the mergers of two conference members into new institutions. Augusta State was merged into Georgia Regents University, which was renamed in 2015 as Augusta University, and NGCSU was merged into the University of North Georgia. In both cases, the new institutions inherited the Peach Belt memberships of the older schools.

The Peach Belt was less than a year old before capturing its first of many national championships. The Columbus State men's golf team took the honor by winning the 1992 national crown, the first of three golf championships the Cougars own. One year later, the Lander men's tennis team began their record-breaking run of eight straight national titles, the first PBC dynasty. Since then, USCA men's golf won three straight national titles from 2004 to 2006 while AASU women's tennis captured four titles overall.

The 2010–11 season was one of the most memorable the league has ever had. Clayton State became the first PBC women's basketball team to capture a national championship. Montevallo watched their men's basketball team reach the Elite Eight, eventually competing in the National Championship Game. Unfortunately, their run came to an end with a loss to Western Washington University. The Columbus State men's tennis team reached the national semifinals while the Clayton State and Armstrong Atlantic State women's tennis teams also played in the national semifinals. The North Georgia softball team made an unprecedented third straight appearance in the NCAA Women's College World Series, while Columbus State's Meshack Koyiaki registered a runner-up finish at the Men's Cross Country National Championships. In all, 46 Peach Belt teams made appearances in the NCAA postseason, including seven men's tennis teams and six each in the sports of men's golf and women's tennis.

David Brunk was named the second PBC commissioner in May 2007, replacing Marvin Vanover, who was the first PBC commissioner from 1991 to 2007.

Dr. Kendall Blanchard, president of Georgia Southwestern State University, began the second of his two-year term as the league president in July 2011.

In April 2020, Francis Marion University and the University of North Carolina at Pembroke announced that they would leave the Peach Belt Conference starting in 2021–22, both joining Conference Carolinas.

On April 14, 2021, the conference invited the NAIA's University of South Carolina Beaufort to join in 2022–23 after applying for membership in Division II and gaining acceptance into the NCAA. By July 14, 2022, USCB was accepted into the NAIA's Continental Athletic Conference for its first year of provisional membership while still playing a Peach Belt schedule as part of the Sand Sharks' dual NAIA-NCAA membership. USCB is ineligible for a Peach Belt or NCAA postseason during the three-year transition.

The conference currently holds championships in 16 sports, eight for men and eight for women. The championship sports are men's and women's cross country, men's and women's soccer, women's volleyball, men's and women's basketball, men's and women's tennis, baseball, softball, men's and women's track & field, and men's and women's golf. Men's lacrosse was added on July 10, 2020, with its first season was in spring 2021, and men's and women's indoor track and field was added on August 11, 2023.

On December 13, 2023, the Sunshine State Conference, primary home of PBC track affiliate Embry–Riddle Aeronautical University (and former affiliate Nova Southeastern University), announced it would start sponsoring men's and women's outdoor track & field in the 2025 spring season (2024–25 school year), and accordingly, both schools moved their respective programs to the SSC. Embry–Riddle would remain a PBC affiliate in men's and women's indoor track.

On January 10, 2024, Middle Georgia State University announced that it had received an invitation by the PBC and would join the conference, beginning the 2025–26 academic year.

On July 1, 2025, longtime PBC deputy commissioner Diana Kling succeeded David Brunk, becoming the conference's third commissioner. Brunk had served as commissioner from 2007 to 2025.

On April 23, 2026, Flagler College announces they will leave the PBC for the Sunshine State Conference at the end of the 2026–27 academic year.

=== Chronological timeline ===
- 1989 – On December 3, 1989, the Peach Belt Conference (PBC) was founded as the Peach Belt Athletic Conference (PBAC). Charter members included Armstrong State College (later Armstrong Atlantic University before merging with Georgia Southern University), Columbus College (now Columbus State University), Francis Marion College (now Francis Marion University), Georgia College (now Georgia College & State University), Lander College (now Lander University), the University of South Carolina at Aiken (USC Aiken) and the University of South Carolina at Spartanburg (USC Spartanburg, now the University of South Carolina Upstate or USC Upstate), beginning the 1990–91 academic year.
- 1991 – Augusta College (later Augusta State University, now Augusta University) joined the PBAC in the 1991–92 academic year.
- 1992 – The Pembroke State University (now the University of North Carolina at Pembroke, or UNC Pembroke) joined the PBAC in the 1992–93 academic year.
- 1994 – Kennesaw State College (now Kennesaw State University) joined the PBAC in the 1994–95 academic year.
- 1995 – Clayton State College (later Clayton College and State University, now Clayton State University) joined the PBAC in the 1995–96 academic year.
- 1997 – The University of North Florida joined the PBAC in the 1997–98 academic year.
- 2000 – The PBAC was renamed by shortening its name to the Peach Belt Conference (PBC), beginning the 2000–01 academic year.
- 2005:
  - Kennesaw State and North Florida left the PBC to join the Division I ranks National Collegiate Athletic Association (NCAA) and the Atlantic Sun Conference (ASUN) after the 2004–05 academic year.
  - North Georgia College & State University (now the University of North Georgia) joined the PBC in the 2005–06 academic year.
- 2006 – Georgia Southwestern State University joined the PBC in the 2006–07 academic year.
- 2007 – USC Upstate left the PBC to join the NCAA Division I ranks and the Atlantic Sun after the 2006–07 academic year.
- 2009 – Flagler College and the University of Montevallo joined the PBC in the 2009–10 academic year.
- 2012:
  - Young Harris College joined the PBC in the 2012–13 academic year.
  - The University of Alabama in Huntsville, Nova Southeastern University and Shorter University joined the PBC as affiliate members for men's & women's outdoor track & field in the 2013 spring season (2012–13 academic year).
- 2014 – The Florida Institute of Technology (Florida Tech) joined the PBC as an affiliate member for men's & women's outdoor track & field in the 2015 spring season (2014–15 academic year).
- 2016 – Alabama–Huntsville (UAH) and Shorter left the PBC as affiliate members for men's & women's outdoor track & field after the 2016 spring season (2015–16 academic year).
- 2017:
  - Two institutions left the PBC to join their respective new home primary conferences, both after the 2016–17 academic year:
    - Montevallo to rejoin the Gulf South Conference (GSC) as a full member
    - and Armstrong State to discontinue its athletic program when it was merged into Georgia Southern University
  - The Daytona Beach campus of Embry–Riddle Aeronautical University joined the PBC as an affiliate member for men's and women's outdoor track & field in the 2018 spring season (2017–18 academic year).
- 2019 – Two institutions joined the PBC as affiliate members, both effective in the 2019–20 academic year:
  - Albany State University for women's soccer
  - and Claflin University for baseball
- 2021:
  - Francis Marion and UNC Pembroke left the PBC to join the Conference Carolinas (CC) after the 2020–21 academic year.
  - Nova Southeastern left the PBC as an affiliate member for men's and women's outdoor track & field after the 2021 spring season (2020–21 academic year).
  - Alabama–Huntsville (UAH) and Shorter rejoined the PBC as affiliate members for men's lacrosse (with former full member Montevallo also rejoining that sport) in the 2022 spring season (2021–22 academic year).
  - Savannah State University joined the PBC as an affiliate member for women's golf in the 2021–22 academic year.
- 2022 – The University of South Carolina at Beaufort (South Carolina–Beaufort or USC Beaufort) joined the PBC in with the 2022–23 academic year.
- 2023:
  - Young Harris left the PBC to join the Conference Carolinas (CC) after the 2022–23 academic year.
  - Central State University (and Embry–Riddle adding the sport into its PBC affiliate membership) joined the PBC as an affiliate member for men's and women's indoor track & field in the 2024 spring season (2023–24 academic year).
- 2024:
  - Embry–Riddle left the PBC as an affiliate member for men's and women's outdoor track & field after the 2024 spring season (2023–24 academic year); although Embry–Riddle would remain in the conference for men's and women's indoor track & field.
  - Shorter left the PBC to join the Conference Carolinas for all sports after the 2023–24 academic year, including its PBC affiliated sport of men's lacrosse.
  - Edward Waters University joined the PBC as an affiliate member for women's golf in the 2024–25 academic year.
- 2025:
  - Middle Georgia State University joined the PBC in the 2025–26 academic year.
  - Salem University joined the PBC as an affiliate member for women's volleyball in the 2025 fall season (2025–26 academic year).
  - Virginia State University joined the PBC as an affiliate member for men's lacrosse in the 2026 spring season (2025–26 academic year).
- 2027
  - Flagler will leave the PBC for the Sunshine State Conference (SSC) after the 2026–27 academic year.
  - Valdosta State University will join the PBC in the 2027–28 academic year.

== Member schools ==
=== Current members ===
The PBC currently has 11 full members, with all but one being public schools. Reclassifying members listed in yellow.

Institution	Location	Founded	Affiliation	Enrollment	Nickname	Joined (Note: Represents the calendar year when fall sports competition begins.)	Colors
Augusta University	Augusta, Georgia	1828	Public (Note: Part of the University System of Georgia.)	11,584	Jaguars	1991	
Clayton State University	Morrow, Georgia	1969	Public	6,172	Lakers	1995	
Columbus State University	Columbus, Georgia	1958	Public	7,937	Cougars	1990	
Flagler College	St. Augustine, Florida	1968	Nonsectarian	2,530	Saints	2009	
Georgia College & State University	Milledgeville, Georgia	1889	Public	7,097	Bobcats	1990	
Georgia Southwestern State University	Americus, Georgia	1906	Public	3,704	Hurricanes	2006	
Lander University	Greenwood, South Carolina	1872	Public	4,423	Bearcats	1990	
Middle Georgia State University	Cochran, Georgia (Note: Middle Georgia State's main campus is in Macon, where the women's cross-country and volleyball teams and men's and women's tennis teams are housed; the other intercollegiate athletics teams compete on the Cochran campus.)	2013	Public	8,409	Knights	2025	
University of North Georgia	Dahlonega, Georgia	1873	Public (Note: Federally designated as a senior military college. Civilians are also enrolled.)	19,298	Nighthawks	2005	
University of South Carolina Aiken	Aiken, South Carolina	1961	Public (Note: Part of the University of South Carolina System.)	3,855	Pacers	1990	
University of South Carolina Beaufort	Bluffton, South Carolina	1959	Public	2,204	Sand Sharks	2022	

=== Future member ===
The PBC will have one new full member, also a public school.

Institution	Location	Founded	Affiliation	Enrollment	Nickname	Joining (Note: Represents the calendar year when fall sports competition begins.)	Colors	Primary conference
Valdosta State University	Valdosta, Georgia	1906	Public (Note: Part of the University System of Georgia.)	10,305	Blazers	2027		Gulf South (GSC)

=== Affiliate members ===
The PBC currently has nine affiliate members, five being private schools and four being public.

Institution	Location	Founded	Affiliation	Enrollment	Nickname	Joined (Note: Represents the calendar year when fall sports competition begins.)	Colors	PBC sport(s)	Primary conference
University of Alabama in Huntsville (Note: Alabama–Huntsville was an affiliate of the Peach Belt for men's and women's outdoor track & field from the 2013 to 2016 spring seasons (2012–13 to 2015–16 school years).) (UAH)	Huntsville, Alabama	1969	Public	8,564	Chargers	2021		men's lacrosse	Gulf South (GSC)
Claflin University	Orangeburg, South Carolina	1869	United; Methodist (Note: Also a historically black college and university.)	1,960	Panthers	2019		baseball	Central (CIAA)
Clark Atlanta University	Atlanta, Georgia	1988 (Note: Merger of Atlanta University (1865) and Clark College (1869) in 1988.)	United; Methodist	4,252	Panthers	2026		women's golf	Southern (SIAC)
Edward Waters University	Jacksonville, Florida	1866	AME Church	1,177	Tigers	2024		women's golf	Southern (SIAC)
Embry–Riddle Aeronautical University	Daytona Beach, Florida	1926	Nonsectarian	8,755	Eagles	2023		men's indoor track & field	Sunshine State (SSC)
Embry–Riddle Aeronautical University	Daytona Beach, Florida	1926	Nonsectarian	8,755	Eagles	2023		women's indoor track & field	Sunshine State (SSC)
University of Montevallo (Note: Montevallo was a full member of the Peach Belt from 2009–10 to 2016–17.)	Montevallo, Alabama	1896	Public	3,142	Falcons	2021		men's lacrosse	Gulf South (GSC)
Salem University	Salem, West Virginia	1888	Nonsectarian (For-profit)	894	Tigers	2025		women's volleyball	D-II Independent
Savannah State University	Savannah, Georgia	1890	Public	3,208	Tigers	2021		women's golf	Southern (SIAC)
Virginia State University	Ettrick, Virginia (Note: The campus has a Petersburg mailing address.)	1882	Public	5,605	Trojans	2025		men's lacrosse	Central (CIAA)

=== Former members ===
The PBC has eight former full members, all but one are public schools:

Institution	Location	Founded	Affiliation	Enrollment	Nickname	Joined (Note: Represents the calendar year when fall sports competition begins.)	Left (Note: Represents the calendar year when spring sports competition ends.)	Current conference
Armstrong State University	Savannah, Georgia	1935	Public	N/A	Pirates & Lady Pirates	1990	2017	N/A (Note: Armstrong State was merged into Georgia Southern University since 2017.)
Francis Marion University	Florence, South Carolina	1970	Public	3,923	Patriots	1990	2021	Carolinas (CC)
Kennesaw State University	Kennesaw, Georgia (Note: The main campus has a Kennesaw mailing address but is in unincorporated Cobb County.)	1963	Public	42,983	Owls	1994	2005	Conf. USA (CUSA) (Note: Current NCAA Division I athletic conference.)
University of Montevallo (Note: Montevallo remains in the Peach Belt as an affiliate member for men's lacrosse.)	Montevallo, Alabama	1896	Public	2,625	Falcons	2009	2017	Gulf South (GSC)
University of North Carolina at Pembroke	Pembroke, North Carolina	1887	Public	8,318	Braves	1992	2021	Carolinas (CC)
University of North Florida	Jacksonville, Florida	1969	Public	16,594	Ospreys	1997	2005	Atlantic Sun (ASUN)
University of South Carolina Upstate	Spartanburg, South Carolina	1967	Public	5,405	Spartans	1990	2007	Big South
Young Harris College	Young Harris, Georgia	1886	United; Methodist	1,408	Mountain Lions	2012	2023	Carolinas (CC)

=== Former affiliate members ===
The PBC has seven former affiliate members, three were a public school, while four were private schools:

Institution	Location	Founded	Affiliation	Enrollment	Nickname	Joined (Note: Represents the calendar year when fall sports competition begins.)	Left (Note: Represents the calendar year when spring sports competition ends.)	Colors	PBC sport(s)	Primary conference
University of Alabama in Huntsville (Note: Alabama–Huntsville remains in the Peach Belt as an affiliate member for men's lacrosse.)	Huntsville, Alabama	1969	Public	9,636	Chargers	2012	2016		men's outdoor track & field	Gulf South (GSC)
University of Alabama in Huntsville	Huntsville, Alabama	1969	Public	9,636	Chargers	2012	2016		women's outdoor track & field	Gulf South (GSC)
Albany State University	Albany, Georgia	1903	Public (Note: Also a historically black college and university.)	6,809	Golden Rams	2019	2026		women's soccer	Southern (SIAC)
Central State University	Wilberforce, Ohio	1887	Public	2,719	Marauders	2023	2025		men's indoor track & field	Southern (SIAC)
Central State University	Wilberforce, Ohio	1887	Public	2,719	Marauders	2023	2025		women's indoor track & field	Southern (SIAC)
Embry–Riddle Aeronautical University	Daytona Beach, Florida	1926	Nonsectarian	7,603	Eagles	2017	2024		men's outdoor track & field	Sunshine State (SSC)
Embry–Riddle Aeronautical University	Daytona Beach, Florida	1926	Nonsectarian	7,603	Eagles	2017	2024		women's outdoor track & field	Sunshine State (SSC)
Florida Institute of Technology	Melbourne, Florida	1958	Nonsectarian	7,855	Panthers	2014	2018		men's outdoor track & field	Sunshine State (SSC)
Florida Institute of Technology	Melbourne, Florida	1958	Nonsectarian	7,855	Panthers	2014	2018		women's outdoor track & field	Sunshine State (SSC)
Nova Southeastern University	Davie, Florida	1964	Nonsectarian	20,898	Sharks	2012	2021		men's outdoor track & field	Sunshine State (SSC)
Nova Southeastern University	Davie, Florida	1964	Nonsectarian	20,898	Sharks	2012	2021		women's outdoor track & field	Sunshine State (SSC)
Shorter University	Rome, Georgia	1873	Baptist	1,482	Hawks	2012	2016		men's outdoor track & field	Carolinas (CC)
Shorter University	Rome, Georgia	1873	Baptist	1,482	Hawks	2012	2016		women's outdoor track & field	Carolinas (CC)
Shorter University	Rome, Georgia	1873	Baptist	1,482	Hawks	2021	2024		men's lacrosse	Carolinas (CC)

=== Membership timeline ===
Full member (all sports) Full member (non-football) Associate member (football-only) Associate member (other sports)

== Sports ==
A divisional format was used for men's and women's basketball until the 2020–21 school year.
East
- Augusta
- Flagler
- ~~Francis Marion~~
- Lander
- ~~UNC Pembroke~~
- USC Aiken
West
- Clayton State
- Columbus State
- Georgia College
- Georgia Southwestern State
- North Georgia
- ~~Young Harris~~

Conference sports
Sport	Men's	Women's
Baseball	✓	
Basketball	✓	✓
Cross country	✓	✓
Golf	✓	✓
Lacrosse	✓	
Soccer	✓	✓
Softball		✓
Tennis	✓	✓
Track & field indoor	✓	✓
Track & field outdoor	✓	✓
Volleyball		✓

=== Men's sponsored sports by school ===
Departing members/teams in pink.

School	Baseball	Basketball	Cross country	Golf	Lacrosse	Soccer	Tennis	Track & field indoor	Track & field outdoor	Total PBC sports
Augusta	✓	✓	✓				✓		✓	5
Clayton State		✓	✓	✓		✓		✓	✓	6
Columbus State	✓	✓	✓	✓			✓		✓	6
Flagler	✓	✓	✓	✓	✓	✓	✓	✓		8
Georgia College	✓	✓	✓	✓			✓			5
Georgia Southwestern State	✓	✓	✓	✓		✓				6
Lander	✓	✓	✓	✓	✓	✓	✓	✓		8
Middle Georgia State	✓	✓				✓	✓			4
North Georgia	✓	✓		✓		✓	✓			5
USC Aiken	✓	✓	✓	✓		✓				5
USC Beaufort	✓	✓	✓	✓				✓	✓	6
Totals	10+1	11	9	9	2+3	7	7	4+1	4	59+5
Affiliate members
Alabama–Huntsville					✓					1
Claflin	✓									1
Embry–Riddle								✓		1
Montevallo					✓					1
Virginia State					✓					1
Future members
Valdosta State	✓	✓	✓	✓			✓			5

=== Women's sponsored sports by school ===
Departing members/teams in pink.

School	Basketball	Cross country	Golf	Soccer	Softball	Tennis	Track & field indoor	Track & field outdoor	Volleyball	Total PBC sports
Augusta	✓	✓			✓	✓		✓	✓	6
Clayton State	✓	✓		✓			✓	✓		5
Columbus State	✓	✓	✓	✓	✓	✓		✓		7
Flagler	✓	✓	✓	✓	✓	✓	✓		✓	8
Georgia College	✓	✓		✓	✓	✓			✓	6
Georgia Southwestern State	✓	✓		✓	✓	✓				5
Lander	✓	✓	✓	✓	✓	✓	✓		✓	8
Middle Georgia State	✓	✓		✓	✓	✓			✓	6
North Georgia	✓	✓	✓	✓	✓	✓		✓		7
USC Aiken	✓	✓		✓	✓				✓	5
USC Beaufort	✓	✓	✓	✓	✓		✓	✓		7
Totals	11	11	5+3	10	10	8	4+1	5	6+1	66+5
Affiliate members
Clark Atlanta			✓							1
Edward Waters			✓							1
Embry–Riddle							✓			1
Salem									✓	1
Savannah State			✓							1
Future members
Valdosta State	✓	✓		✓	✓	✓			✓	6

=== Other sponsored sports by school ===
School	Men			Women		
School	Football	Golf	Wrestling	Field hockey	Golf	Lacrosse
Augusta		WCC (Note: The NCAA sponsors Division II men's and women's golf championships, but the Augusta men's and women's golf teams compete as Division I members.)			WCC	
Flagler						GSC
Lander			CC	SAC		GSC
Valdosta State	IND					
