= University of South Carolina Salkehatchie =

Public college in Allendale and Walterboro, South Carolina, US

- Type: Public college
- Established: 1965
- Parent institution: University of South Carolina System
- Dean: April Cone, DNP, MSN, RN
- Faculty: 47
- Undergraduates: 745
- Location: Allendale, South Carolina, U.S. 33°0′45″N 81°17′56″W
- Campus: Urban, 220 acres (89 ha)
- Colors: Garnet and gold
- Nickname: Indians
- Sporting affiliations: NJCAA
- Website: uscsalkehatchie.sc.edu

The University of South Carolina Salkehatchie (USC Salkehatchie) is a public college with campuses in Allendale and Walterboro, South Carolina. It is one of four regional University of South Carolina System campuses which make up Palmetto College. USC Salkehatchie is accredited by the Southern Association of Colleges and Schools as part of the flagship campus (University of South Carolina Columbia). More than 1,100 students attend at one of its two sites.

== History ==
The citizens of Allendale, Bamberg, and Hampton counties led an effort in 1964 to establish a center of higher education for their region of South Carolina. The proposal was warmly received by the General Assembly, and the Western Carolina Higher Education Commission was created to investigate the possibility of a college for the region. House Speaker Solomon Blatt pleaded with the University of South Carolina to build two-year colleges across the state so as to prevent any possible expansion by Clemson. As a result, USC planned a campus for the area, and it was decided that the campus be placed in Allendale because it was the hometown of Lieutenant Governor Robert Evander McNair. Barnwell County joined the commission in 1967 and Colleton County followed in 1984. The campus was therefore named after the Salkehatchie River because it runs through all five counties of the commission. The first classes were held in 1965 at an unused elementary school building in Allendale and the initial enrollment was 76 students. The campus gradually expanded its programs and it began offering extension courses in 1978 at Walterboro. A permanent campus was established at Walterboro in 1982 through the acquisition of the old Walterboro High School building and gymnasium.

== Academics ==
Students enrolled at USC Salkehatchie can complete the requirements for three bachelor's degree programs that are formally awarded by other institutions:

- The bachelor's degree in Elementary Education program is conducted in partnership with USC Aiken. The core requirements are completed as USC Salkehatchie courses. Faculty members from USC Aiken teach the upper-level education classes on the USC Salkehatchie campus.
- The bachelor's degree in Nursing program is conducted in partnership with the College of Nursing at USC Columbia. General-education and lower-level courses (first two years) are completed as USC Salkehatchie courses. Upper-level nursing courses are offered on the USC Salkehatchie campus through USC Columbia with most clinical practice in local hospitals and clinics.
- The Bachelor of Arts in Liberal Studies program, as other Palmetto Programs, is conducted following a blended delivery method consisting of traditional classroom, two-way video, and online courses taught by faculty members from USC Salkehatchie and the other regional campuses of the University of South Carolina (Lancaster, Sumter, and Union). All courses can be taken at the USC Salkehatchie campus. The degree is awarded by Extended University at USC Columbia.

Students completing the first two years of higher education at USC Salkehatchie can also transfer to other campuses of the University of South Carolina with minimal effort. Within the constraints of program requirements, students completing the first two years of higher education at USC Salkehatchie can transfer credits from courses in which they earned at least a C to practically every university in the United States. For those who cannot pursue further higher education, USC Salkehatchie offers the Associate in Arts degree and the Associate in Science degree to students who have earned 60 hours of credit and have met all program requirements.

Most of their students receive some sort of financial aid, and over 80% of their students attend the school at no cost out of pocket.

== Athletics ==
The University of South Carolina Salkehatchie sponsors seven varsity level teams, known as the Indians, to compete in Region X of the National Junior College Athletic Association. The Indians field four women's teams in basketball, soccer, softball, and volleyball. The men's teams compete in baseball, basketball and soccer.

== Notable people ==
In December of 2022 Matt Lynch was hired by Salkehatchie to rebuild its men's basketball team from scratch; as of 2024 he was the only out gay head coach in college men's basketball.
