= University of South Carolina Sumter =

Public college in Sumter, South Carolina

Coordinates: 33°55′59″N 80°22′26″W

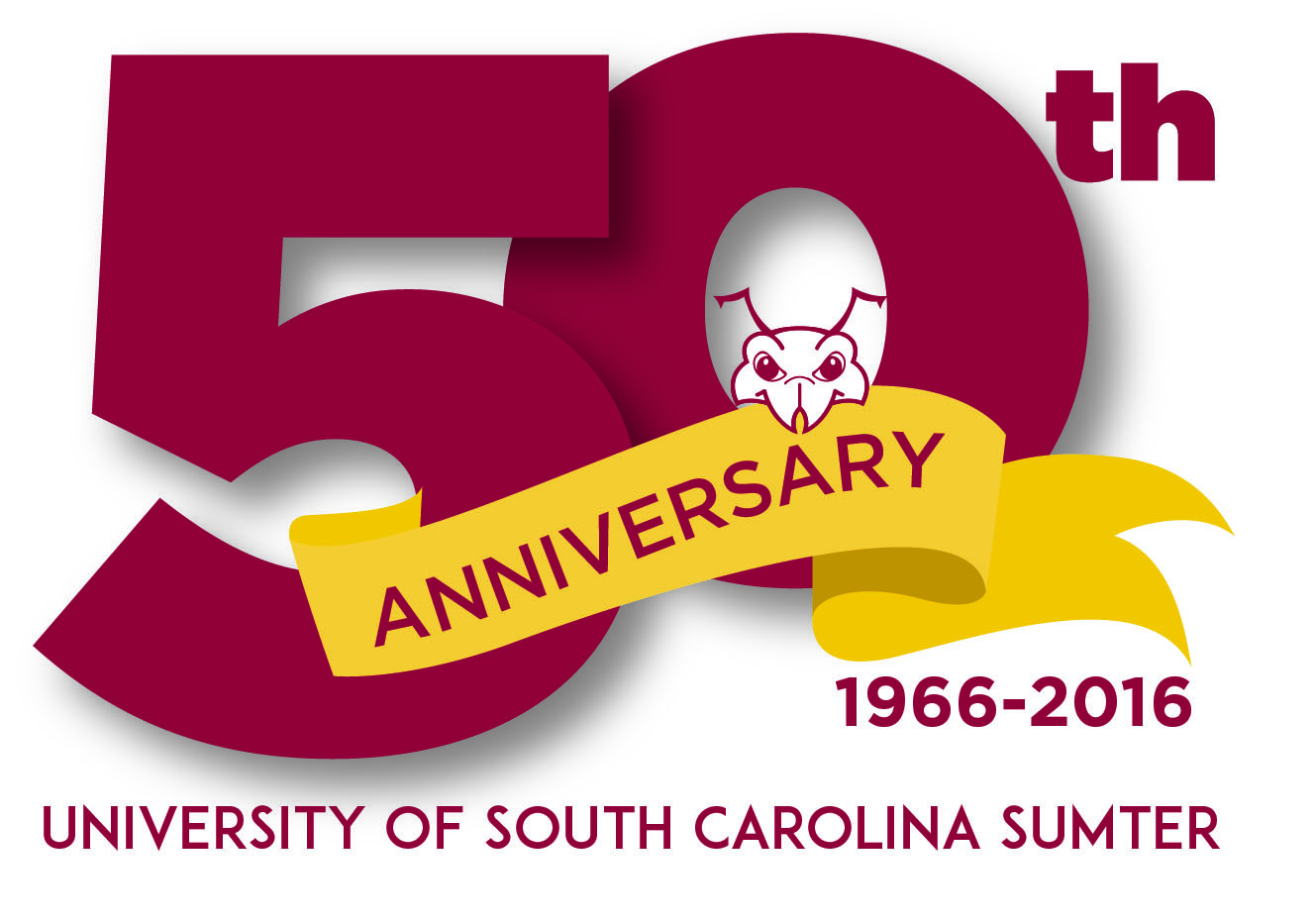
- Type: Public college
- Established: Clemson-1966; USC-1973
- Parent institution: University of South Carolina System
- Dean: Eric Reisenauer (Interim)
- Academic staff: 42 Full-time and 27 Part-time
- Undergraduates: 1,419 (all undergraduate) (Fall 2022)
- Location: Sumter, South Carolina, United States
- Campus: Urban, 50 acres (20.2 ha)
- Colors: Garnet and White
- Nickname: Fire Ants
- Sporting affiliations: NJCAA
- Mascot: Blaze
- Website: www.uscsumter.edu

The University of South Carolina Sumter (USC Sumter) is a public college in Sumter, South Carolina. It is part of the University of South Carolina System and one of the four regional USC campuses which make up Palmetto College. It only awards associate degrees and has approximately 1,500 students. It is accredited by the Commission on Colleges of the Southern Association of Colleges and Schools. USC Sumter has 2 available nursing programs through fellow USC schools (USC Aiken and USC Upstate)

== History ==
In 1965 the Sumter County Commission on Higher Education, desiring to fulfill its purpose of starting or bringing a public college to Sumter, entered into an agreement with Clemson University to establish an academic branch of Clemson in Sumter at the old Sumter Airport site on Miller Road. This was Clemson's first such branch. The original campus consisted of four buildings and was designed to accommodate 550 students. The initial enrollment of 97 had grown to only 245 by 1973. In 1973, upset by this poor growth rate, the Commission successfully negotiated with Clemson and USC to terminate the Sumter branch's relationship with Clemson and to become a branch of the USC System.

USC Sumter now has an enrollment of more than a thousand. USC Sumter confers two-year associate degrees and also offers baccalaureate degree programs in business administration, elementary education, nursing, early childhood education and interdisciplinary studies.

== Colleges and schools ==
- College of Arts and Sciences
- School of Nursing
- School of Business Administration
- School of Education
- School of Interdisciplinary Studies

== Athletics ==
The University of South Carolina Sumter announced on Monday, October 30, 2006 the return of intercollegiate athletics to the campus. The USC Sumter Fire Ants began playing in the 2007-2008 academic year with baseball and softball teams. Competitive sports had not been on campus since the 1970s, when the mascot was The Partisans and the school colors were purple and white.

University of South Carolina Sumter now sponsors thirteen collegiate teams known as the Fire Ants. The newest sports are Men's and Women's Track and Field and Men's and Women's Cross Country that will officially begin in the 2024-2025 season. The athletic department colors are "fire ant red" and white, while the university's colors are garnet, black, and white. The teams compete in Region X of Division I in the NJCAA.

The baseball team plays at Riley Park, three miles east of campus. The softball team plays at Palmetto Park, a half mile northwest of campus.
