= University of South Carolina Union =

Campus in South Carolina

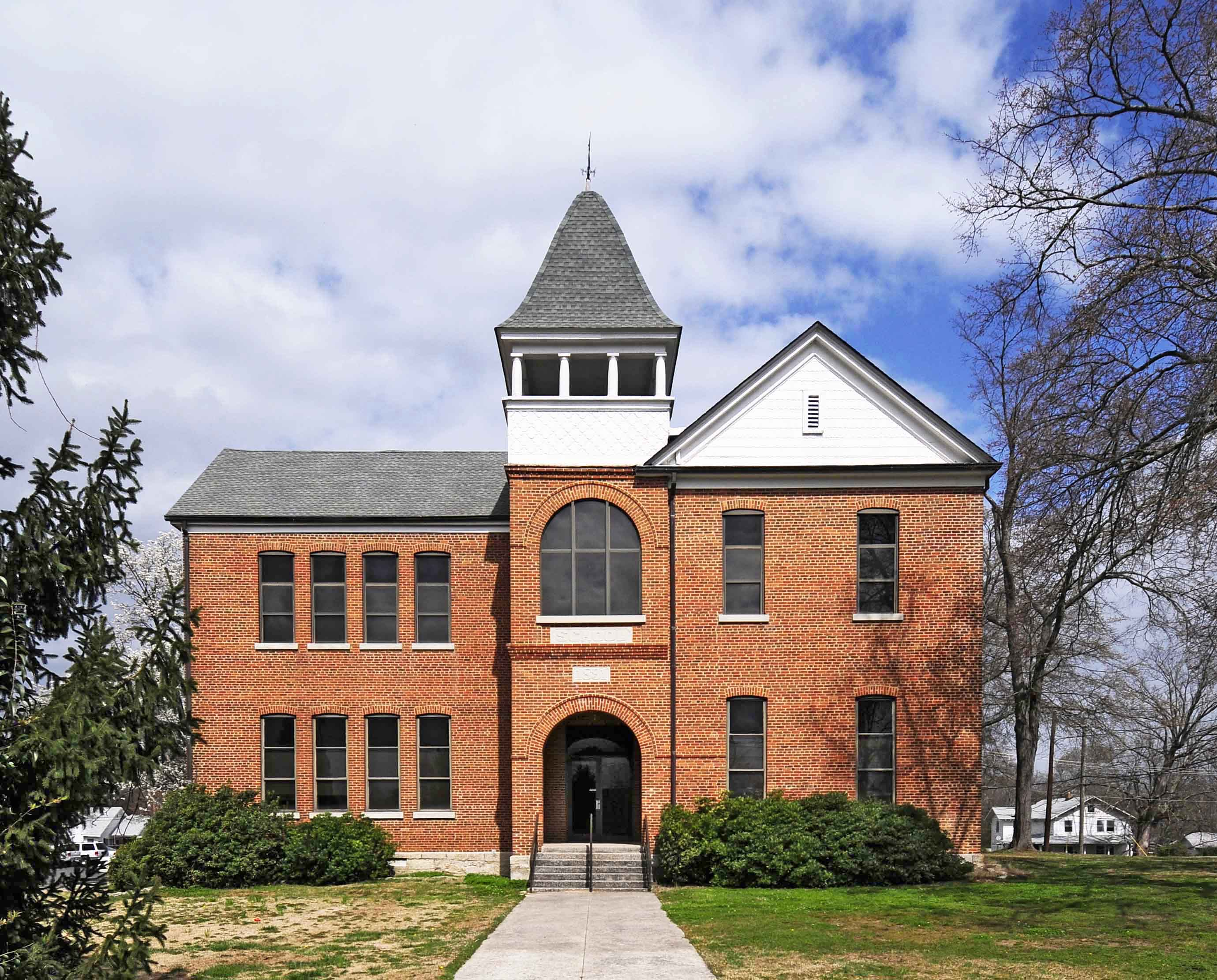
- Type: Public satellite campus
- Established: 1965
- Parent institution: University of South Carolina System
- Dean: Randy Lowell, PhD
- Academic staff: 18 full time
- Undergraduates: 1098
- Location: Union, South Carolina, United States; 34°43′1″N 81°37′14″W
- Campus: Urban, 7 acres (2.8 ha)
- Colors: Garnet and black
- Nickname: Bantams
- Sporting affiliations: NJCAA
- Website: uscunion.sc.edu

The University of South Carolina Union (USC Union) is a satellite campus of the University of South Carolina (USC) in Union, South Carolina. It has a branch campus in Laurens, South Carolina. It is a part of the University of South Carolina System and one of the four regional USC campuses which make up Palmetto College. USC Union is accredited by the Southern Association of Colleges and Schools and awards associate degrees in both art and science. USC Union is also able to offer the USC Aiken Bachelor of Science in Nursing through a partnership with USC Aiken, allowing students to complete the entirety of their studies at either the Union or Laurens campus.

== History ==
In the 1960s, the citizens of Union formed the Union County Commission for Higher Education to attract a college to their area. The University of South Carolina sought to expand its reach throughout the state and agreed to build an extension campus in Union. Classes began at the campus in 1965 with an initial enrollment of 51 students.

== Athletics ==
USC Union's athletics department, USC Union Bantam Athletics (or simply Bantam Athletics), is home to a variety of competitive sports teams including men's soccer and baseball as well as women's volleyball and softball, all of which compete at the junior college level. Bantam Athletics also hosts a rifle team, a bass fishing team, and e-sports gaming which compete at the club level.

== Clubs and Organizations ==
USC Union has a number of student organizations:

- African American Association
- Art Club
- Garden and Botany Club
- Research Club
- Rotaract Club
- Student Government Association

== Festivals ==
USC Union hosts two annual festivals.

=== Upcountry Literary Festival ===
Created and directed by Randall Ivey, the Upcountry Literary Festival allows poets, musicians, storytellers, playwrights, essayists, and short-story writers the opportunity to gather and share their works. It was held virtually in 2021.

=== Latin American Film Festival ===
The Latin American Film Festival is held in celebration of Hispanic Heritage Month.

== See also ==
- Central Graded School
- Main Street Grammar School
