= University of South Carolina Lancaster =

- Type: Public college
- Established: 1959
- Parent institution: University of South Carolina System
- Dean: Courtney B. Catledge
- Faculty: 75
- Administrative staff: 50
- Students: 2,300
- Location: 476 Hubbard Drive, Lancaster, South Carolina, U.S. 34°44′33″N 80°46′57″W
- Campus: 150 acres (61 ha); Urban
- Colors: Blue, gold
- Nickname: Lancers
- Sporting affiliations: NJCAA
- Mascot: Lance the Lancer
- Website: usclancaster.sc.edu

The University of South Carolina Lancaster (USCL or USC Lancaster) is a public college in Lancaster, South Carolina, United States. It is one of the four regional campuses which make up Palmetto College in the University of South Carolina System. It is accredited by the Southern Association of Colleges and Schools Commission on Colleges and offers associate degrees and bachelor's degrees. As of 2017, more than 1,900 students attended the college at its campus in the Piedmont region of South Carolina.

USC Lancaster is governed by the University of South Carolina Board of Trustees. The campus has four local affiliate groups: the Lancaster County Commission for Higher Education, the Educational Foundation of USC Lancaster, the USC Lancaster Board of Visitors, and the Town Gown Advisory Council.

== History ==
The University of South Carolina conducted a program in the 1950s to expand its reach across the state of South Carolina. Simultaneously, the Lancaster County Chamber of Commerce identified a goal of establishing a college in the county. Chamber members presented their idea to the administration of the university, and within approximately one year the University of South Carolina Lancaster Extension Center opened with 51 students. Four other extension campuses were established. The campus in Lancaster is the center of a six-county region (Chester, Chesterfield, Fairfield, Lancaster, Kershaw, and York) in the north central piedmont of South Carolina.

The college began holding classes in the Williams House in downtown Lancaster in September 1959, but by the mid-1960s growth forced it to find a larger facility. With the support of the local community, the college moved to a tract of land on the northern limits of the City of Lancaster. Ten buildings currently serve as the campus for the college including the downtown Lancaster Native American Studies Center established in October 2012 and an Indian Land Location established in August 2018.

== Academics ==
USC Lancaster offers four associate degree programs (arts, sciences, business, and criminal justice) and three baccalaureate degree programs.

Through Palmetto College and the entire USC system, an additional 24 online degree completion programs are offered including business, elementary education, public health, criminal justice, and hospitality.

== Athletics ==
USC Lancaster's athletic program is known as the Lancers, and their four teams compete in Region X of the NJCAA. The Lancers sponsor women's soccer (inaugural season in 2007), women's volleyball, baseball (inaugural season in 2008), and men's soccer.
