= South Carolina–Beaufort Sand Sharks =

Intercollegiate sports teams of University of South Carolina–Beaufort

Coordinates: 32.4638°N 80.6713°W

- University: University of South Carolina Beaufort
- Conference: Peach Belt (primary)
- NCAA: Division II
- Athletic director: Genia Montford (interim)
- Location: Beaufort, South Carolina
- First season: 2007
- Varsity teams: 11 (5 men's, 6 women's)
- Basketball arena: Sand Shark Recreation Center
- Baseball stadium: Richard Gray Baseball Complex
- Softball stadium: Richard Gray Softball Complex
- Soccer stadium: USCB Campus/Fin Land Field
- Mascot: Finnegan
- Nickname: Sand Sharks
- Colors: Navy blue, sand, and light blue
- Website: uscbathletics.com
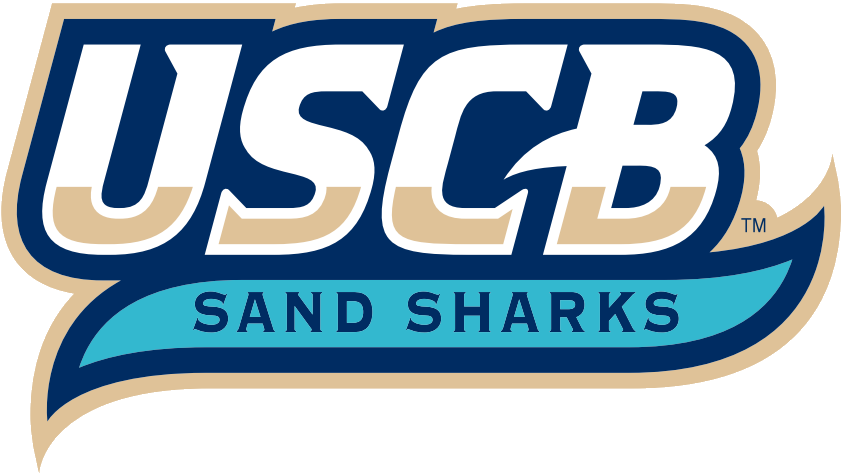

The USC Beaufort Sand Sharks (also USCB Sand Sharks or South Carolina–Beaufort Sand Sharks) are the athletic teams that represent the University of South Carolina Beaufort, located in Beaufort, South Carolina, in intercollegiate sports as a member of the NCAA Division II ranks, primarily competing in the Peach Belt Conference (PBC) since the 2022–23 academic year (while competing full-time in the NCAA since 2023–24). The Sand Sharks previously competed in the Continental Athletic Conference, formerly known as the Association of Independent Institutions (AII), for the 2022–23 school year only (which they were a member on a previous stint during the 2007–08 school year, which was when the school began its athletics program and joined the NAIA), while they were continuing their transition as members of the Peach Belt and of NCAA Division II; and in the Sun Conference of the National Association of Intercollegiate Athletics (NAIA), formerly known as the Florida Sun Conference (FSC), from 2008–09 to 2021–22.

== Move to NCAA Division II ==
On April 14, 2021, South Carolina–Beaufort reported that the NCAA Division II's Peach Belt Conference invited the Sand Sharks to join the conference in 2022 after applying for membership in and gaining acceptance into the NCAA. Also on that day, USCB planned to add men's and women's basketball as a condition of its NCAA and Peach Belt membership. The teams in that sport played their first season in 2023–24. By July 15, 2022, USCB was already accepted into the Continental Athletic Conference for its first year of provisional membership while still playing a Peach Belt schedule as part of the Sand Sharks' one-year NAIA-NCAA dual membership, but are ineligible for a Peach Belt or NCAA postseason during the three-year transition.

== Conference affiliations ==
NAIA

- Association of Independent Institutions (2007–2008)
- Sun Conference (2008–2022)
- Continental Athletic Conference (2022–2023)

NCAA

- Peach Belt Conference (2022–present)

== Varsity teams ==
USC Beaufort competes in eleven intercollegiate varsity sports: Men's sports include baseball, basketball, cross country, golf, and indoor and outdoor track and field; while women's sports include basketball, cross country, golf, soccer, softball, and indoor and outdoor track and field.

Men's sports	Women's sports
Baseball	Basketball
Basketball	Cross country
Cross country	Golf
Golf	Soccer
Track and field^{†}	Softball
	Track and field^{†}
† – Track and field includes both indoor and outdoor

== Facilities ==
Both the Sand Shark baseball and softball teams currently practice and play all home games at the City of Hardeeville's Recreation Complex (the Richard Gray Baseball Complex).
