= University of South Carolina Beaufort =

Public university with three locations in South Carolina, U.S.

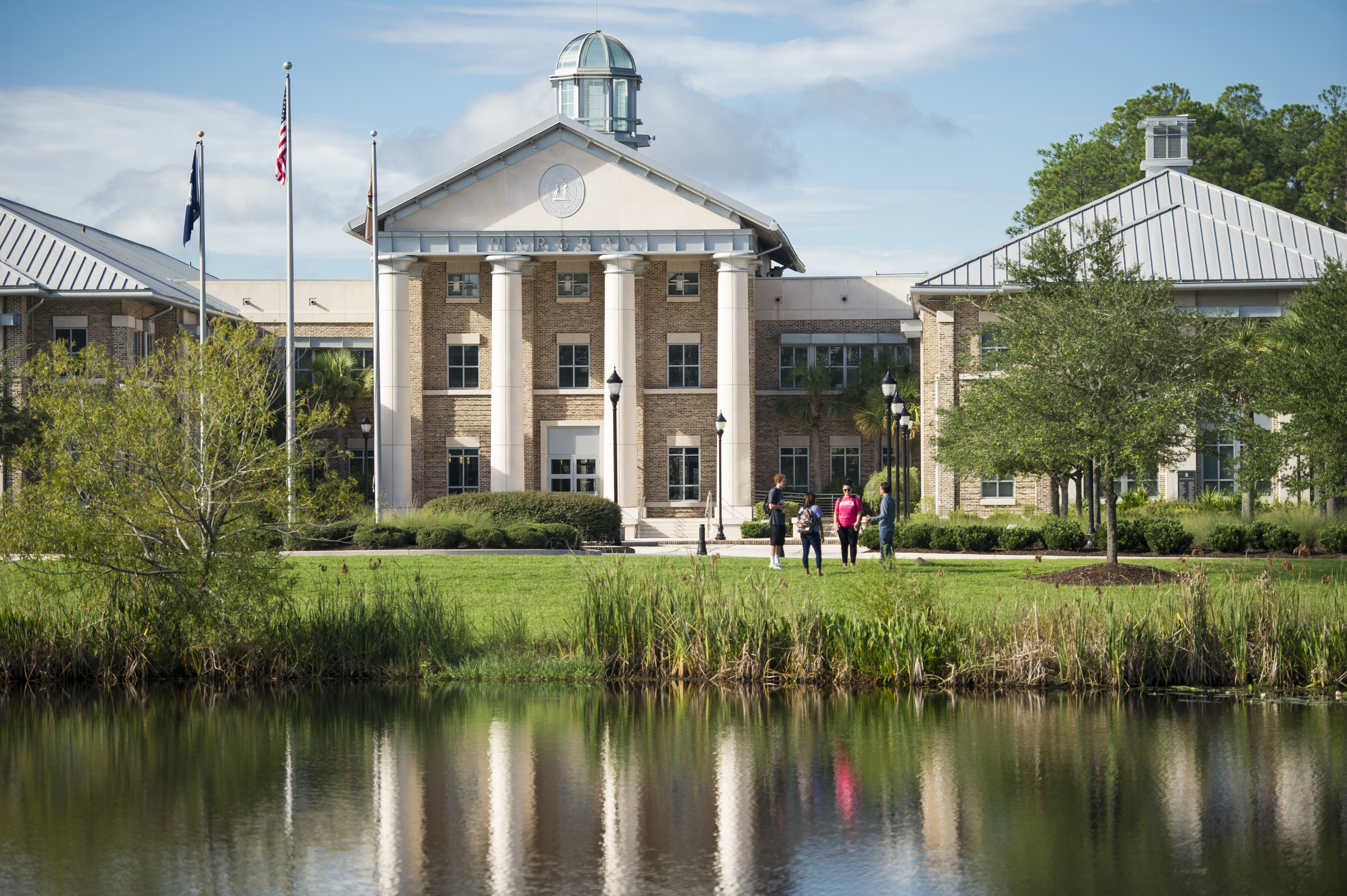
- The Hargray Building at USC-Beaufort in Bluffton, SC
- Type: Public college
- Established: 1959; 67 years ago
- Parent institution: University of South Carolina System
- Chancellor: Al Panu
- Faculty: 96
- Undergraduates: 2,124
- Postgraduates: 14
- Location: Beaufort, South Carolina, U.S. 32°18′15″N 80°58′14″W
- Campus: Rural, 208 acres (84 ha)
- Colors: Navy blue, sand, and light blue
- Nickname: Sand Sharks
- Sporting affiliations: NCAA Division II – Peach Belt
- Mascot: Finnegan
- Website: www.uscb.edu

The University of South Carolina Beaufort (USCB or USC Beaufort) is a public college with three campuses in the Lowcountry region of South Carolina. It is part of the University of South Carolina System, enrolls about 2,000 students, and offers over 50 areas of study. The main campus is in Bluffton. The institution's campus in Beaufort houses the school's honor programs and the Department of Visual Arts & Design. The campus location on Hilton Head Island is home to the institution's program for hospitality management.

== History ==
In 1795, a preparatory school and college in Beaufort was chartered as the Beaufort College to serve the families of local residents. Classes began in 1802, and the college reached a prominent status in the community during the antebellum period. The college was forced to close in 1861 at the beginning of the Civil War and the Beaufort College building, constructed in 1852, was occupied by the Union forces for use as a hospital.

The college building was used by the Freedmen's Bureau during Reconstruction, and it was an elementary school from 1909 to 1959. In the 1950s, two factors brought about the return of higher education to the Beaufort region. The University of South Carolina sought to expand its reach throughout the state by the establishment of extension campuses and the Beaufort County Higher Education Commission was formed by citizens of Beaufort to bring a campus to the area. A branch campus of the University of South Carolina was established in 1959 at the site of the old Beaufort College, but the official opening was delayed by Hurricane Gracie.

The campus experienced steady growth through the years, and it expanded south along Carteret Street. In 2002, the campus was upgraded from a regional campus to a senior campus offering bachelor's degrees. USCB opened a second, 200-acre (81 ha) campus with housing in Bluffton. In 2004, it also began offering programs for the United States Marine Corps on Parris Island, South Carolina. In 2018, the institution opened its third campus, located on Hilton Head Island, to house the program for hospitality management.

== Academics ==
USCB is one of the three senior campuses in the University of South Carolina system. It is accredited by the Southern Association of Colleges and Schools.

USCB offers the region's only human services degree as well as more traditional degrees like English, psychology, business, communication studies, and education. The school opened a nursing facility in spring 2009. Human simulators provide nursing students hands-on training opportunities. Another popular program capitalizing on nearby Hilton Head Island resorts is the hospitality management program, which draws international students and provides internships. The biology program allows students to explore and study first-hand the continental-shelf and estuarine environment with concentrations in marine science and in coastal ecology and conservation. It offers the bachelor's degree in human services online through Palmetto College.

== Student life ==
Undergraduate demographics as of Fall 2023
Race and ethnicity	Total
White	59%
Black	20%
Hispanic	11%
Two or more races	5%
International student	2%
Asian	1%
Unknown	1%
Economic diversity
Low-income (Note: The percentage of students who received an income-based federal Pell grant intended for low-income students.)	44%
Affluent (Note: The percentage of students who are a part of the American middle class at the bare minimum.)	56%

The institution has 2,023 undergraduate students. The gender makeup of the student body is 69 percent female and 31 percent male. The racial makeup of the student body is 60 percent white, 20 percent African-American, 10 percent Hispanic, and 10 percent other.

=== Student organizations ===
USCB offers numerous student organizations, including several special interest clubs, religious groups, honor societies, and academic clubs. The largest organization is its Student Government Association, consisting of twelve student senators, a vice president, president, and an executive board.

=== Greek life ===
USCB recognizes five chapters of national fraternities and sororities. The sole fraternity on campus is Kappa Alpha Psi. Sororities include Alpha Kappa Alpha, Zeta Phi Beta, Phi Mu, and Zeta Tau Alpha. Fraternities and sororities are housed within the residential dorms.

NPC sororities

- Phi Mu 2016
- Zeta Tau Alpha 2015

NPHC fraternity

- Kappa Alpha Psi 2018

NPHC sororities

- Alpha Kappa Alpha 2016
- Zeta Phi Beta 2015

== Athletics ==
The University of South Carolina–Beaufort (USC Beaufort or USCB) athletic teams are called the Sand Sharks. The institution is a member of the NCAA Division II and competes in the Peach Belt Conference (PBC) since the 2022–23 academic year (while competing full-time in the NCAA beginning 2023–24). The Sand Sharks previously competed in the Continental Athletic Conference, formerly known as the Association of Independent Institutions (AII), for the 2022–23 school year only (which they were a member on a previous stint during the 2007–08 school year, which when the school began its athletics program and joined the NAIA), while they were continuing their transition as members of the Peach Belt and of NCAA Division II; and in the Sun Conference of the National Association of Intercollegiate Athletics (NAIA), formerly known as the Florida Sun Conference (FSC), from 2008–09 to 2021–22.

USC Beaufort competes in 13 intercollegiate varsity sports. Men's sports include basketball, baseball, cross country, golf and track & field (indoor and outdoor). Women's sports include basketball cross country, golf, soccer, softball and track & field (indoor and outdoor).

=== Facilities ===
The Sand Sharks baseball and softball teams currently practice and play home games at the City of Hardeeville's Recreation Complex (The Richard Gray Baseball Complex). Facilities on campus includes a soccer field and the Recreation Center.

=== Move to NCAA Division II ===
On April 14, 2021, the athletic department announced its intention to pursue an NCAA Division II and join the Peach Belt Conference (PBC) in that division starting in the fall of 2022. Men's and women's basketball were added to the scholarship sports as a condition of its NCAA and Peach Belt memberships, and USC Beaufort intended for the teams to start their first season in 2023–24. By July 15, 2022, USCB was already accepted into the Continental Athletic Conference for its first year of provisional membership while still playing a Peach Belt schedule as part of the Sand Sharks' one-year NAIA-NCAA dual membership, but are eligible for a Peach Belt post season play but ineligible for the NCAA postseason during the three-year transition.

== Housing ==
=== Palmetto Village ===
Palmetto Village is located on USCB's Bluffton campus. The school offers apartment style housing, with each dorm consisting of four bedrooms, two bathrooms, and a kitchen and dining area. There are ten dorms on campus, including five freshmen dorms.

== Notable alumni ==
- William Elliot, American attorney and former member of the U.S. House of Representatives
- Robert Rhett, former U.S. Senator
- Robert Woodward Barnwell, former U.S. Senator
- Poppy Miller, CBS Sports soccer studio host
