= University of South Carolina Aiken =

Public university in Aiken, South Carolina, U.S.

The University of South Carolina Aiken
- The quad facing the Etherredge Center
- Type: Public university
- Established: 1961; 65 years ago
- Parent institution: University of South Carolina System
- Chancellor: Daniel Heimmermann
- Provost: Phillip Bridgmon
- Faculty: 251
- Students: 4,500
- Undergraduates: 3,559
- Postgraduates: 970
- Location: Aiken, South Carolina (portions), U.S. 33°34′23.91″N 81°46′06.34″W
- Campus: 453 acres (183 ha); Urban
- Colors: USCA Midnight & USCA Fire Red
- Nickname: Pacers
- Sporting affiliations: NCAA Division II – Peach Belt
- Mascot: Ace the Pacer
- Website: usca.edu

The University of South Carolina Aiken (USCA, formerly USC Aiken) is a public university in the Aiken, South Carolina area. It is part of the University of South Carolina System and offers undergraduate degree programs as well as master's degrees. Additional graduate courses and degree programs are offered through the University of South Carolina Extended Graduate Campus program. The University of South Carolina Aiken awards baccalaureate degrees in more than 30 major areas of study including the bachelor of science in business administration online through Palmetto College.

== Campus ==
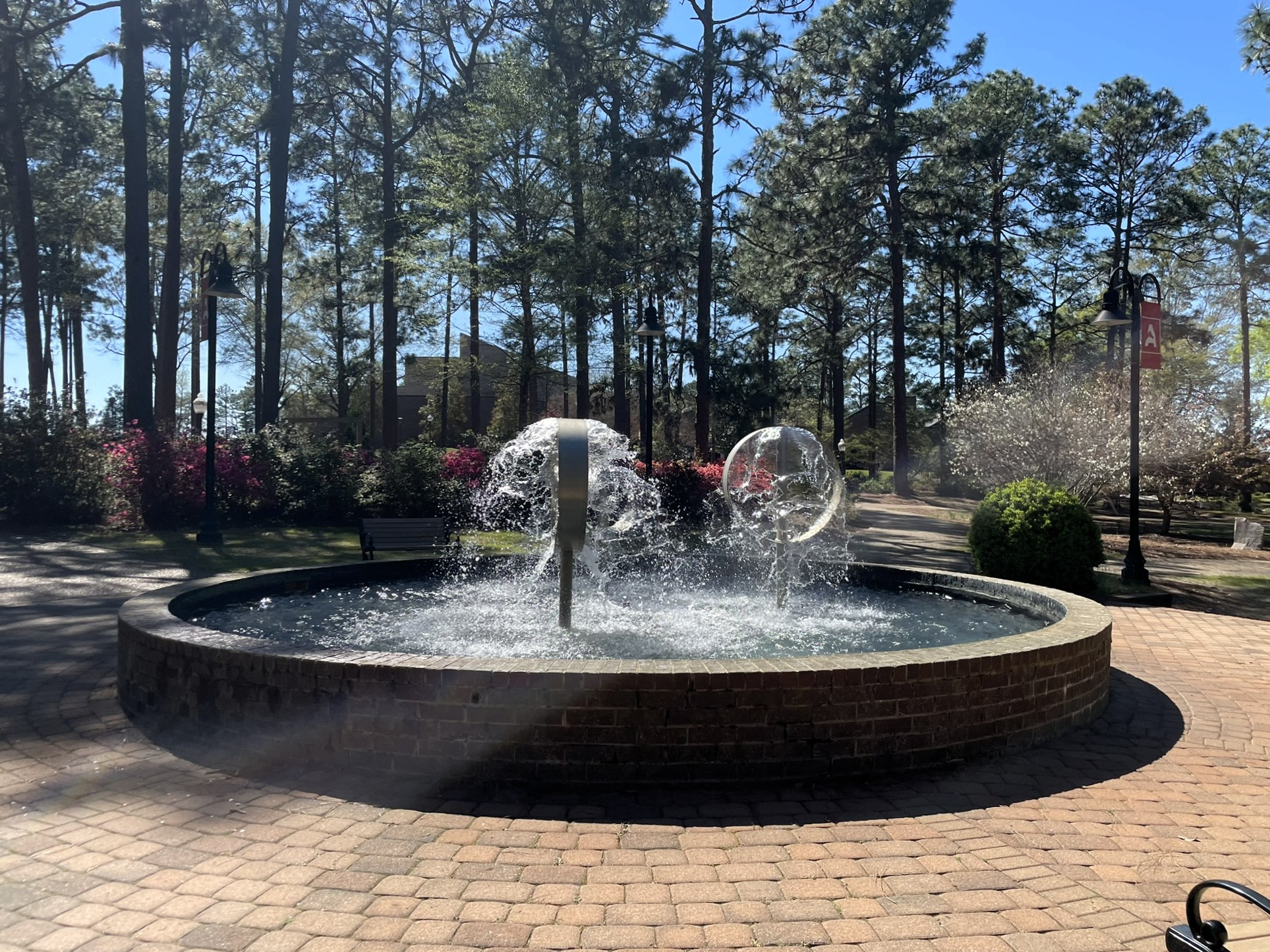
The quad fountain on USCA's main campus

The campus is located on 453 acres (183 ha) in the Aiken area, 18 miles (29 km) from Augusta, Georgia, and 60 miles from Columbia, South Carolina.

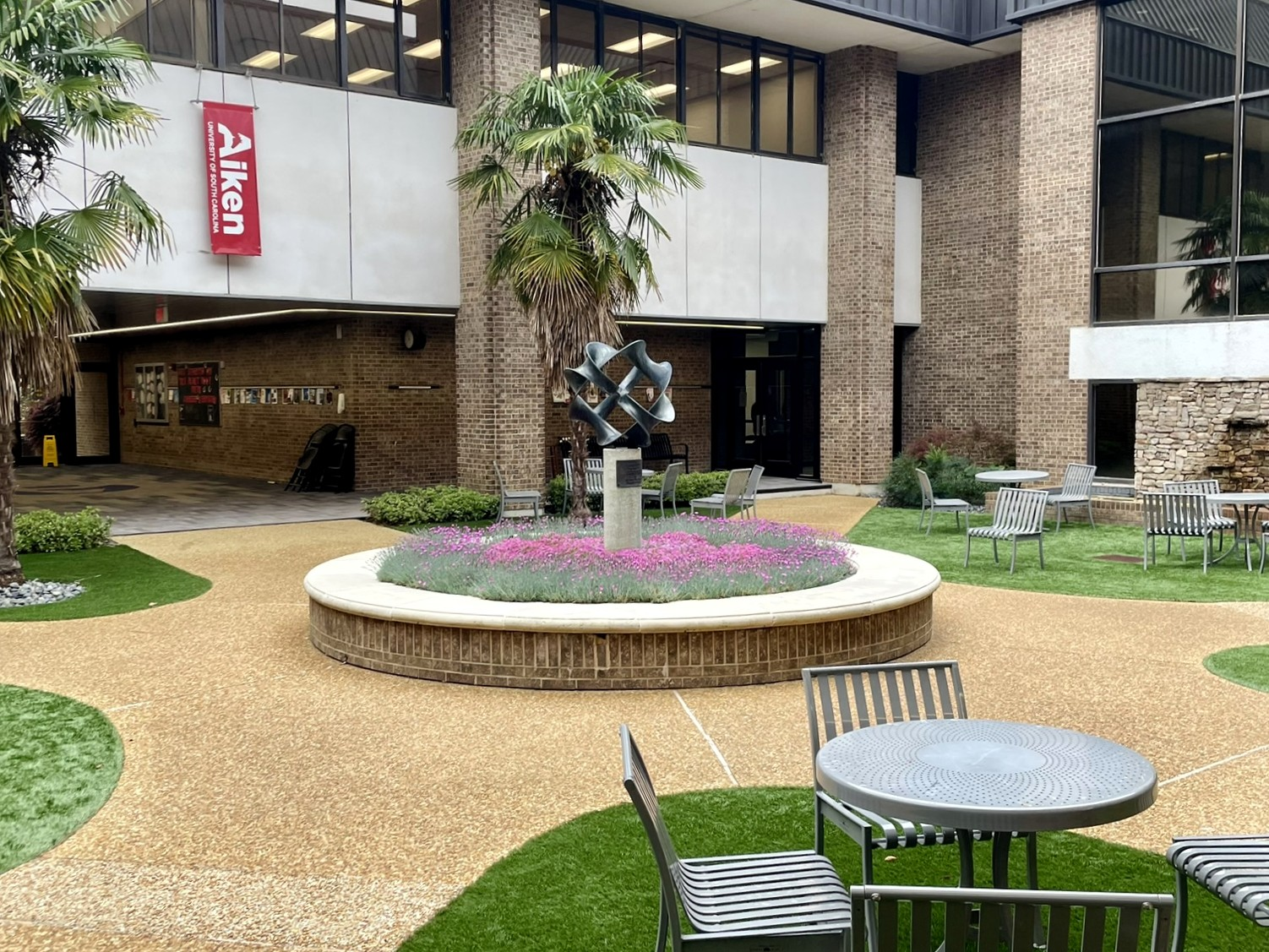
The Double Knot sculpture at the Robert E. Penland Administration Building

As of 2020 portions of the campus are in the Aiken city limits, though the majority is outside of the Aiken city limits in an unincorporated area.

== Academics ==
The university is accredited by the Southern Association of Colleges and Schools. Many of its programs are accredited or approved by program- or discipline-specific accreditors:

- The School of Education's undergraduate programs in early childhood, elementary, secondary, and special education are accredited by the Council for the Accreditation of Educator Preparation (CAEP). Its graduate program for the M.Ed. in educational technology also is accredited by CAEP.
- The School of Business Administration is accredited by the Association to Advance Collegiate Schools of Business.
- The School of Nursing's program is approved by the South Carolina State Board of Nursing and is accredited by the National League for Nursing Accrediting Commission.
- USCA's master of science in applied clinical psychology degree program is accredited by the Master's in Psychology and Counseling Accreditation Council (MPCAC).
- USCA's department of chemistry and physics is nationally certified by the American Chemical Society (ACS). USCA is the smallest university in the state of South Carolina to be nationally certified by the American Chemical Society and one of only nine in the state.
- USCA's undergraduate programs in Mechanical Engineering and Process Engineering are accredited by the Accreditation Board for Engineering and Technology (ABET).

The University of South Carolina Aiken was ranked number 49 among "Regional Universities" in the southern US in the 2023 edition of U.S. News & World Report's guide America's Best Colleges. In 2019, the university was ranked #1 among top public regional colleges in the southern US. The university has frequently been ranked in the top three public regional colleges and has been ranked first eleven times: 2002, 2003, 2006, 2007, 2009, 2010, 2011, 2012, 2013, 2015, 2016, 2017, 2018, 2019 and 2021.

== Students ==
As of the fall of 2026, USCA had a record undergraduate enrollment of approximately 3,559 undergraduate students and 970 graduate students. Students enjoy a low faculty-to-student ratio of 14:1 and 69% of classes consisting of 20 or fewer students. The university reached record enrollment rates in the fall of 2018.

== Student life ==
Undergraduate demographics as of Fall 2023
Race and ethnicity	Total
White	60%
Black	22%
Hispanic	8%
Two or more races	6%
International student	2%
Asian	1%
Unknown	1%
Economic diversity
Low-income (Note: The percentage of students who received an income-based federal Pell grant intended for low-income students.)	41%
Affluent (Note: The percentage of students who are a part of the American middle class at the bare minimum.)	59%

=== Greek life ===
The Greek system at USCA consists of five fraternities and seven sororities. In fall 2021, seven percent of undergraduate men and six percent of undergraduate women were active in USCA's Greek life community.

=== Student publications ===
The school newspaper is the weekly Pacer Times, Founded in 1963 as the Rebellaire, physical copies of the Pacer Times were once printed by the Aiken Standard. The school also has a student-run literary journal, Broken Ink.

== Athletics ==
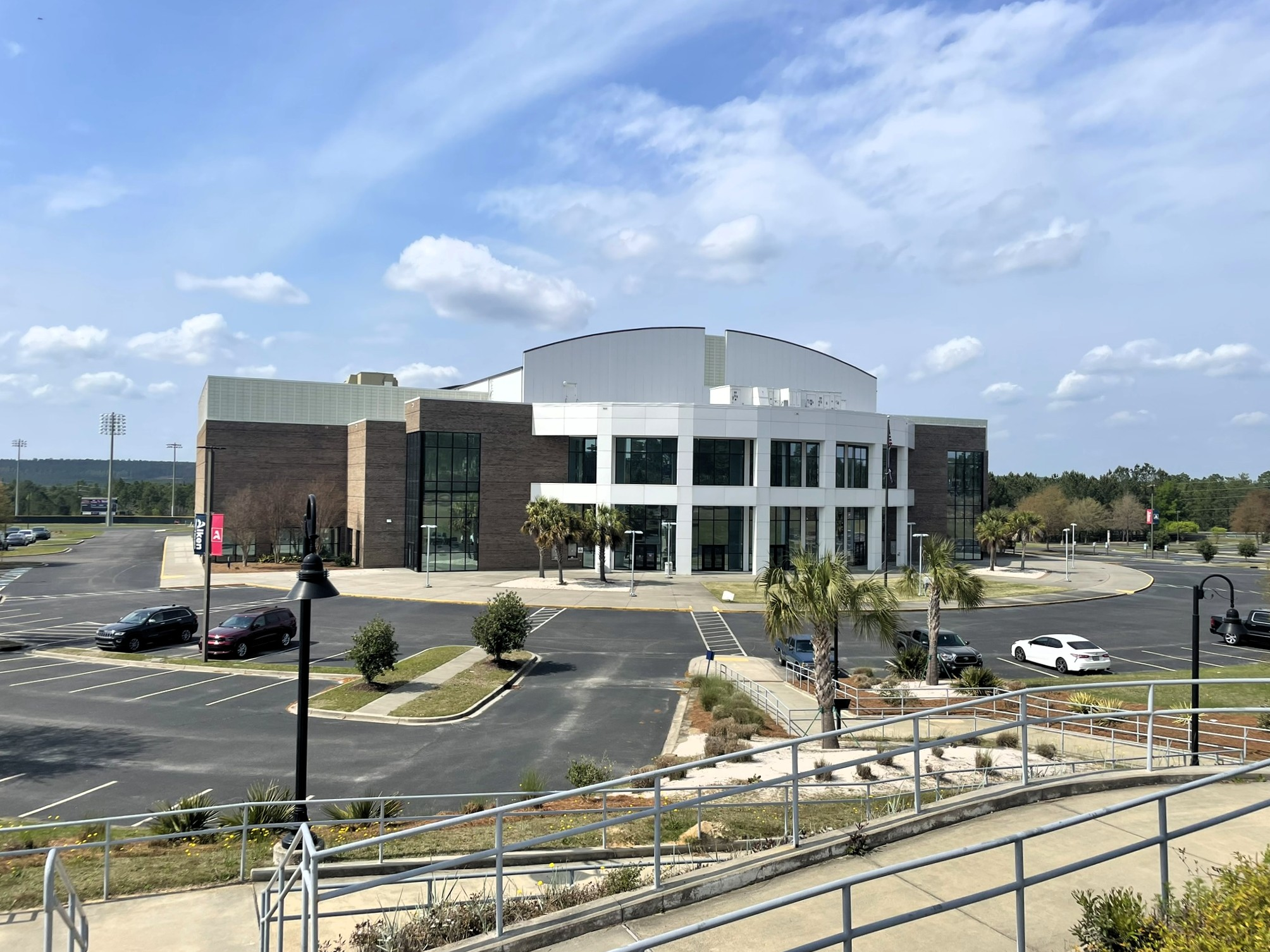
The Convocation Center, home of USCA's basketball and volleyball programs

USCA's athletic teams are the Pacers. Competing in intercollegiate athletics at the Division II level of the National Collegiate Athletic Association (NCAA), the Pacers have been members of the Peach Belt Conference since the 1990–91 academic year.

The school's teams were initially known as the Rebels. The mascot name was changed to Pacers in 1971.

The Pacers compete in ten intercollegiate varsity sports. Men's sports include baseball, basketball, cross country, golf, and soccer; women's sports include basketball, cross country, soccer, softball, and volleyball. Men's and women's tennis were discontinued at the end of the 2018–19 school year. The Pacers have also formerly offered both a cheerleading program and an award-winning dance team, with both replaced by a combined co-ed spirit squad.

== Notable alumni ==
- Chris Corley — former South Carolina state politician
- Shannon Erickson — South Carolina state politician
- Roberto Hernandez — professional baseball player
- Leon Lott — commander of the South Carolina State Guard and sheriff of Richland County
- Tommy Moore — former South Carolina state politician
- Melissa Lackey Oremus — South Carolina state politician
- Steve J. Palmer — actor and producer
- Adam Riggs — professional baseball player
- Kimberly Ritchie — marine biologist
- Christale Spain — chair of the South Carolina Democratic Party
- Mitch Spence — professional baseball player
- William Garrett Wright — poet and editor
