= University of South Carolina Upstate =

Public university in Spartanburg, South Carolina, US

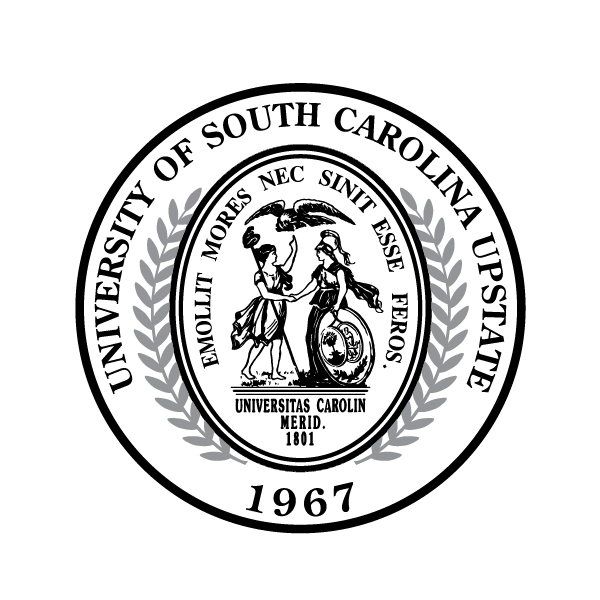
- Former names: Spartanburg Regional Campus (1967–1975); University of South Carolina Spartanburg (1975–2004)
- Type: Public university
- Established: 1967; 59 years ago
- Parent institution: University of South Carolina System
- Endowment: $12.6 million
- Chancellor: Bennie Harris
- Faculty: 377
- Students: 4,913
- Undergraduates: 4,481
- Postgraduates: 432
- Location: Spartanburg address, South Carolina, United States; 34°59′51″N 81°58′14″W
- Campus: 330 acres (130 ha); Suburban 330 acres (134 ha)
- Colors: Upstate Green, Slate Gray, Gray, and Light Gray
- Nickname: Spartans
- Sporting affiliations: NCAA Division I Big South Conference
- Website: uscupstate.edu
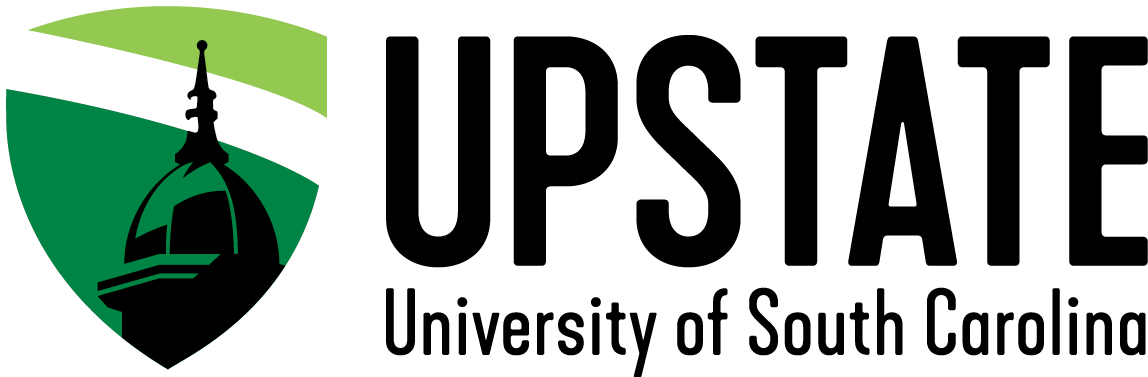

The University of South Carolina Upstate (USC Upstate) is a public university in unincorporated Spartanburg County, South Carolina, United States. It has a Spartanburg postal address. Founded in 1967 and formerly known as University of South Carolina Spartanburg, the institution changed its name in the summer of 2004. It offers bachelor's, master's and doctoral degrees for students in the Upstate and surrounding areas. It is part of the University of South Carolina System and home to approximately 5,200 students and 340 full-time faculty. It is accredited by the Southern Association of Colleges and Schools.

== History ==
After the Spartanburg General Hospital decided to discontinue its degree program for nurses, local politicians, led by G.B. Hodge, decided to create a separate university for the region. In 1967 the Spartanburg Regional Campus was opened as a two-year college with an initial enrollment of 177 students. Because of increased popularity, the school became a four-year institution in 1975 and was renamed the University of South Carolina Spartanburg. During the following years, both the campus and the scope of the University expanded.

In the summer of 2004 USC's board of trustees voted to change the name to the University of South Carolina Upstate to better reflect its mission to educate the people of South Carolina's upstate region. It has become the largest educational provider in the University Center Greenville, a consortium of seven institutions of higher learning in Greenville, South Carolina, and the immediate surrounding area.

== Colleges and schools ==
- College of Arts, Social Science, and Humanities
- College of Science and Technology
- Mary Black College of Nursing
- George Dean Johnson Jr., College of Business and Economics
- College of Education, Human Performance, and Health

== Student life ==
Undergraduate demographics as of Fall 2023
Race and ethnicity	Total
White	47%
Black	34%
Hispanic	9%
Two or more races	5%
Asian	3%
International student	2%
Unknown	1%
Economic diversity
Low-income (Note: The percentage of students who received an income-based federal Pell grant intended for low-income students.)	50%
Affluent (Note: The percentage of students who are a part of the American middle class at the bare minimum.)	50%

University of South Carolina Upstate has many clubs and organizations as well as academic teams whose main goals are the intellectual and interpersonal growth of students through community service and wide-ranging cultural activities.

=== Greek life ===
There are several fraternities and sororities on campus.

== Athletics ==
University of South Carolina Upstate sponsors 15 collegiate teams known as the Spartans. From 1971 to 2004, they were known as the Rifles. The athletic department colors are green, white, and black. The teams compete in the Big South Conference and Division I of the NCAA.

These sports are men's and women's basketball, men's and women's soccer, men's and women's golf, baseball, softball, track and field, cross country, and women's volleyball.
