= Blind Willie McTell =

Piedmont blues and ragtime singer and guitarist (1898–1959)

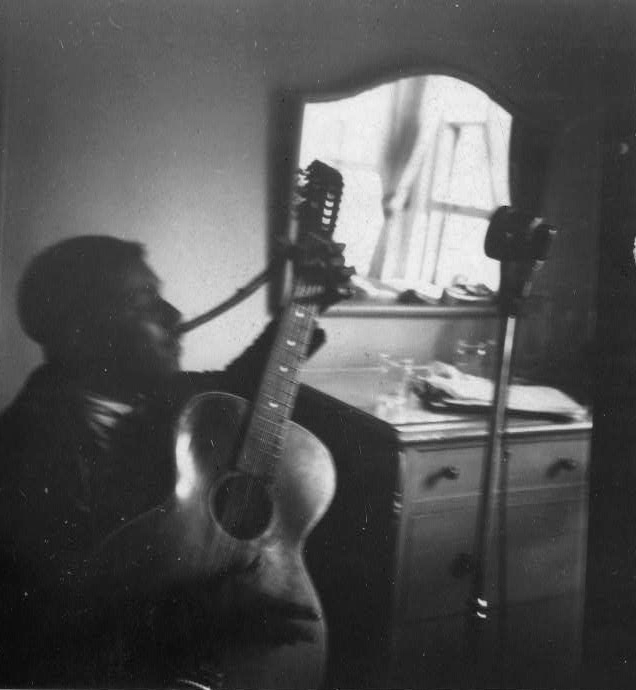
- McTell recording for John Lomax in an Atlanta hotel room, November 1940

Background information
- Also known as: Blind Sammie; Georgia Bill; Hot Shot Willie; Blind Willie; Barrelhouse Sammy; Pig & Whistle Red; Blind Doogie; Red Hot Willie Glaze; Eddie McTier
- Born: William Samuel McTier; Circa 1903; Thomson, Georgia, U.S.
- Died: August 19, 1959 Milledgeville, Georgia, U.S.
- Genres: Country blues; Piedmont blues; ragtime; Delta blues; gospel
- Occupations: Musician; songwriter; songster; preacher
- Instruments: Guitar; vocals
- Years active: 1910s–1956
- Labels: Victor; Columbia; Okeh; Vocalion; Decca; Atlantic; Regal; Prestige; Transatlantic

Blind Willie McTell (born William Samuel McTier; May 5th 1898 – August 19, 1959) was an American Piedmont blues and ragtime singer, songwriter and guitarist. He played in a fluid, syncopated finger picking guitar style common among many East Coast, Piedmont blues players. Like his Atlanta contemporaries, he came to use twelve-string guitars exclusively. McTell was also adept at slide guitar, unusual among ragtime bluesmen. He sang in a smooth and often laid-back tenor which differed greatly from the harsher voices of many Delta bluesmen such as Charley Patton. He performed in various musical styles including blues, ragtime, religious music, and hokum and recorded more than 120 titles during fourteen recording sessions.

He was born William Samuel McTier in the Happy Valley community outside Thomson, Georgia. In his recordings of "Lay Some Flowers on My Grave", "Lord, Send Me an Angel" and "Statesboro Blues", he pronounces his surname MacTell with the stress on the first syllable. He learned to play the guitar in his early teens from his mother and from relatives and neighbors in Statesboro where his family had moved. He was a popular performer on the streets of several Georgia cities, including Augusta and Atlanta where he made his first recordings, eight songs, for Victor Records in 1927 including "Statesboro Blues." He never had a major hit record but he had a prolific recording career with different labels and under different names in the 1920s and '30s including "Blind Sammie" for Columbia, "Georgia Bill" for OKeh, Hot Shot Willie for Victor, and "Blind Willie" for Vocalion and Bluebird. McTell was active in the 1940s and '50s playing at house rent parties, on street corners, at fish fries, on the medicine and tent show circuit, playing on the streets of Atlanta, often with his longtime friend, Curley Weaver as well as hoboing through the South and East. He made his last recordings in 1956 at an impromptu session recorded by an Atlanta record store owner. He died three years later, having lived for years with diabetes and alcoholism. Despite his lack of commercial success, he was one of the few blues musicians of his generation who continued to actively play and record during the 1940s and '50s. He did not live to see the American folk music revival when many bluesmen, including himself, were rediscovered. His popularity was greatest in the decades after his death.

== Biography ==
Most sources give the date of his birth as 1898 but biographer Michael Gray and researchers Bob Eagle and Eric LeBlanc suggest 1903 as most likely on the basis of his entry in the 1910 census. McTell was born blind in one eye and lost his remaining vision by late childhood. He attended schools for the blind in Georgia, New York and Michigan and showed proficiency in music from an early age, learning to read and write music in braille by the early 1920s. This made him well-educated compared to most of his peers who sang the blues. He first started playing the harmonica and accordion before turning to the six-string guitar in his early teens. His family was rich in music; both of his parents and an uncle played the guitar and he and bluesman and gospel pioneer Thomas A. Dorsey were cousins.

McTell's father left the family when Willie was young. After his mother died, in the 1920s, he left his hometown and became an itinerant songster. When traveling between Thomson and Atlanta, he would rely on the train. Like Lead Belly, another songster who began his career on the streets, McTell favored the twelve-string guitar whose greater volume made it suitable for outdoor playing. McTell also performed on Decatur Street and at house parties in the Sweet Auburn district of Atlanta. McTell played at traveling medicine shows, which is how executives from Victor discovered him. They first recorded him in 1927 in their Atlanta studio. Because the contracts at the time were so strict about non-compete clauses, many blues musicians, including McTell would use pseudonyms when recording with different record labels. He went by Blind Willie McTell for Victor and Decca, Blind Sammie for Columbia, Georgia Bill for Okeh, Hot Shot Willie for Victor, Red Hot Willie Glaze for Bluebird, Blind Willie for Vocalion and Bluebird, Barrelhouse Sammie for Atlantic, and Pig & Whistle Red for Regal Records. The name "Pig & Whistle" was a reference to a chain of barbecue restaurants in Atlanta; McTell often played for tips in the parking lot of a Pig'n Whistle restaurant on Ponce de Leon Avenue. He also played behind a nearby building that later became Ray Lee's Blue Lantern Lounge. McTell played a wide variety of music depending on the audience. Victor record label insisted on recording only blues from him given its popularity at the time. In the years before World War II, McTell traveled and performed all around Georgia and the Carolinas but had a harder time getting recognition during the Great Depression when he made some of his best music due in part to reduced promotional budgets at record labels.

McTell married Ruth Kate Williams, now better known as Kate McTell, in 1934. She accompanied him on stage and on several recordings before becoming a nurse in 1939. For most of their marriage, from 1942 until his death, they lived apart, she in Fort Gordon, near Augusta, and he working around Atlanta.

In 1940, John Lomax, a Classics professor at the University of Texas at Austin and his wife, Ruby Terrill Lomax, interviewed and recorded McTell for the Archive of American Folk Song of the Library of Congress in a two-hour session held in their hotel room in Atlanta. These recordings captured McTell's distinctive musical style which bridges the gap between the country blues of the early part of the 20th century and the more conventionally melodious, ragtime-influenced East Coast, Piedmont blues sound. The Lomaxes also elicited from him traditional songs (such as "The Boll Weevil" and "John Henry") and spirituals (such as "Amazing Grace"), which were not part of his usual repertoire. In the interview, John Lomax is heard asking if McTell knows any "complaining" songs (an earlier term for protest songs), to which he replies somewhat uncomfortably and evasively that he does not. The Library of Congress paid McTell $10, the equivalent of $154.56 in 2011, for this two-hour session. The material from this 1940 session was issued in 1960 as an LP and later as a CD under the somewhat misleading title The Complete Library of Congress Recordings notwithstanding the fact that it omitted some of Lomax's interactions showing kindness to him and entirely omitting the contributions of Ruby Terrill Lomax. (Note: McTell's biographer Michael Gray attributes these omissions to the folklore archivist Rae Korson, who was evidently hostile to his New Deal folklore predecessors at the library: "The widely sold version of the McTell-Lomax sessions deletes conversations and information, removes Ruby Lomax from the room almost entirely, making John Lomax seem to monopolize things and keep her silent which he doesn't at all, and robs Lomax of several touches of warmth and humanity, including questions asked by Ruby Terrill and John Lomax.") McTell also recorded some duets with Curley Weaver in the late 1940’s.

Ahmet Ertegun visited Atlanta in 1949 in search of blues artists for this new Atlantic Records label and after finding McTell playing on the street, arranged a recording session. Some of the songs were released on 78 rpm discs but sold poorly. The complete session was released in 1972 as Atlanta Twelve-String. McTell recorded for Regal Records in 1949 but these recordings also met with less commercial success than his previous works. He continued to perform around Atlanta but his career was cut short by ill health, mostly due to diabetes and alcoholism. In 1956, an Atlanta record store owner, Edward Rhodes, discovered McTell playing in the street for quarters and convinced him to play 13 songs on a tape recorder. Prestige Records/Bluesville Records posthumously released as his Last Session in 1961 during the folk music revival. The release would spark an interest in his earlier work as would the surging popularity of rock and roll which took lots of inspiration from blues artists like Willie McTell. McTell had recorded around 120 songs throughout his life over 14 sessions.

From 1957 to 1959, McTell was a preacher at Mt. Zion Baptist Church in Atlanta, focusing more on his faith and gospel music as his health declined.

Blind Willie McTell died of a stroke in Milledgeville, Georgia, in 1959. He was buried at Jones Grove Church, near Thomson, Georgia, his birthplace under a gravestone with the wrong name. David Fulmer, who in 1992 was working on a documentary about McTell took the original gravestone and replaced it with a blue marble gravestone erected on his resting place. Michael Gray found the removal and replacement controversial when he visited the site. McTell was inducted into the Blues Foundation's Blues Hall of Fame in 1981 and the Georgia Music Hall of Fame in 1990.

== Influence ==
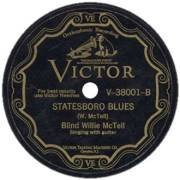
Label of "Statesboro Blues", one of McTell's most notable works

McTell's influence extended over a wide variety of artists. His most famous song, "Statesboro Blues" was adapted by Taj Mahal on his debut album with Jesse Ed Davis on slide guitar, then covered and frequently performed by the Allman Brothers Band. It also shows up on Canned Heat's "Goin' Up the Country" album. A short list of some of the artists who have performed the song includes David Bromberg, Dave Van Ronk, The Devil Makes Three, Chris Smither and Ralph McTell, who changed his name because he liked the song. “Statesboro Blues" was inducted into the Grammy Hall of Fame in 2017. Ry Cooder covered McTell's "Married Man's a Fool" on his 1973 album, Paradise and Lunch. Jack White, of the White Stripes, considers McTell an influence; the White Stripes album De Stijl (2000) is dedicated to him and features a cover of his song "Southern Can Is Mine". The White Stripes also covered McTell's "Lord, Send Me an Angel", releasing it as a single in 2000. In 2014, Jack White covered “Three Women Blues”. In 2013, Jack White's Third Man Records teamed up with Document Records to issue The Complete Recorded Works in Chronological Order of Charley Patton, Blind Willie McTell and the Mississippi Sheiks.

Bob Dylan paid tribute to McTell on at least four occasions. In his 1965 song "Highway 61 Revisited", the second verse begins, "Georgia Sam, he had a bloody nose", an allusion to one of McTell's many recording names (Note: there is no evidence that he used this name on any recordings). Dylan's song "Blind Willie McTell" was recorded in 1983 and released in 1991 on The Bootleg Series Volumes 1-3. Dylan also recorded covers of McTell's "Broke Down Engine" and "Delia" on his 1993 album, World Gone Wrong; (Note: In the liner notes for that album, Dylan wrote, "'Broke Down Engine' is a Blind Willie McTell masterpiece ... it's about Ambiguity, the fortunes of the privileged elite, flood control—watching the red dawn not bothering to dress [sic].") Dylan's song "Po' Boy", on the album Love and Theft (2001), contains the lyric "had to go to Florida dodging them Georgia laws", which comes from McTell's "Kill It Kid". The Bath-based band Kill It Kid was named after the song of the same title.

Willie Nelson, Steve Goodman and David Bromberg also covered songs by McTell.

In 1986, Blind Willie's bar in the Virginia-Highlands neighborhood of Atlanta named after McTell opened. It has featured many blues musicians and bands. In 2005 in nearby Little Five Points, a three-ton mosaic of Blind Willie was commissioned by the City of Atlanta. In 2021, it was moved from Findley Plaza to the corner of Euclid and Austin Avenues.

Since 1992, the Blind Willie McTell Music Festival has been held annually in Thomson, Georgia.

In 1996, author and former journalist David Fulmer released Blind Willie's Blues, a 53-minute documentary about McTell’s life, times, and music, with interviews with African-American history professor Daphne Duval Harrison, blues musician Taj Mahal, guitarist Stefan Grossman, Atlantic Records founder Ahmet Ertegun, McTell's former brother-in-law Rev. A.J. Williams, and Edward Rhodes, who produced McTell's Last Sessions recording. In late 2023, the film was remastered by the Southeastern Folklife Collection at Valdosta State University and uploaded to YouTube.

In 2010, Michael Gray donated the papers used to write his 2007 biography of Willie McTell to Georgia Southern University, which maintains the Willie McTell archives.

In 2018, Statesboro, Georgia erected a statue of McTell and has a trail named after him.

== Sessionography ==
- October 18, 1927: Atlanta, Georgia; for Victor Records, four songs
- October 17, 1928: Atlanta, Georgia; for Victor Records, four songs
- November 26-27 and 29th, 1929: Atlanta, Georgia; for Victor Records, 14 songs
- February 22, 1932: Atlanta, Georgia; for Victor Records, four songs

== Discography ==
=== Singles ===
Year	A-side	B-side	Label	Cat. #	Moniker	Note
1927	"Stole Rider Blues"	"Mr. McTell Got the Blues"	Victor	21124	Blind Willie McTell	
1927	"Writing Paper Blues"	"Mamma, Tain't Long Fo' Day"	Victor	21474	Blind Willie McTell	
1928	"Three Women Blues"	"Statesboro Blues"	Victor	V38001	Blind Willie McTell	
1928	"Dark Night Blues"	"Loving Talking Blues"	Victor	V38032	Blind Willie McTell	
1929	"Atlanta Strut"	"Kind Mama"	Columbia	14657-D	Blind Sammie	
1929	"Travelin' Blues"	"Come on Around to My House Mama"	Columbia	14484-D	Blind Sammie	
1929	"Drive Away Blues"	"Love Changing Blues"	Victor	V38580	Blind Willie McTell	
1930	"Talking to Myself"	"Razor Ball"	Columbia	14551-D	Blind Sammie	
1931	"Southern Can Is Mine"	"Broke Down Engine Blues"	Columbia	14632-D	Blind Sammie	
1931	"Low Rider's Blues"	"Georgia Rag"	OKeh	8924	Georgia Bill	
1931	"Stomp Down Rider"	"Scarey Day Blues"	OKeh	8936	Georgia Bill	
1932	"Mama, Let Me Scoop for You"	"Rollin' Mama Blues"	Victor	23328	Hot Shot Willie	with Ruby Glaze
1932	"Lonesome Day Blues"	"Searching the Desert for the Blues"	Victor	23353	Hot Shot Willie	with Ruby Glaze
1933	"Savannah Mama"	"B and O Blues No. 2"	Vocalion	02568	Blind Willie	
1933	"Broke Down Engine"	"Death Cell Blues"	Vocalion	02577	Blind Willie	
1933	"Warm It Up to Me"	"Runnin' Me Crazy"	Vocalion	02595	Blind Willie	
1933	"It's a Good Little Thing"	"Southern Can Mama"	Vocalion	02622	Blind Willie	
1933	"Lord Have Mercy, if You Please"	"Don't You See How This World Made a Change"	Vocalion	02623	Blind Willie	with "Partner" (Curley Weaver)
1933	"My Baby's Gone"	"Weary Hearted Blues"	Vocalion	02668	Blind Willie	
1935	"Bell Street Blues"	"Ticket Agent Blues"	Decca	7078	Blind Willie McTell	with Kate McTell
1935	"Dying Gambler"	"God Don't Like It"	Decca	7093	Blind Willie McTell	with Kate McTell
1935	"Ain't It Grand to Be a Christian"	"We Got to Meet Death One Day"	Decca	7130	Blind Willie McTell	with Kate McTell
1935	"Your Time to Worry"	"Hillbilly Willie's Blues"	Decca	7117	Blind Willie McTell	
1935	"Cold Winter Day"	"Lay Some Flowers on My Grave"	Decca	7810	Blind Willie McTell	
1950	"Kill It Kid"	"Broke-Down Engine Blues"	Atlantic	891	Barrelhouse Sammy	
1950	"River Jordan"	"How About You"	Regal	3260	Blind Willie	
1950	"It's My Desire"	"Hide Me in Thy Bosom"	Regal	3272	Blind Willie	
1950	"Love Changing Blues"	"Talkin' to You Mama"	Regal	3277	Willie Samuel McTell	with Curley Weaver; attributed to "Pig and Whistle Band"

As an accompanist

Year	Artist	A-side	B-side	Label	Cat. #	Note
1927	Alfoncy and Bethenea Harris	"Teasing Brown"	"This Is Not the Stove to Brown Your Bread"	Victor	V38594	
1931	Ruth Willis	"Experience Blues"	"Painful Blues"	Columbia	14642-D	
1931	Ruth Willis	"Rough Alley Blues"	"Low Down Blues"	OKeh	8921	
1931	Ruth Willis	"Talkin' to You Wimmin' About the Blues"	"Merciful Blues"	OKeh	8932	
1935	Curley Weaver	"Tricks Ain't Walking No More"	"Early Morning Blues"	Decca	7077	
1935	Curley Weaver	"Sometime Mama"	"Two-Faced Woman"	Decca	7906	McTell plays only on B-side
1935	Curley Weaver	"Oh Lawdy Mama"	"Fried Pie Blues"	Decca	7664	
1949	Curley Weaver	"My Baby's Gone"	"Ticket Agent"	Sittin' In With	547	

=== Long-plays ===
Year	Title	Label	Cat. #	Note
1961	Last Session	Bluesville	BV 1040	recorded in 1956
1966	Blind Willie McTell: 1940	Melodeon	MLP 7323	subtitled The Legendary Library of Congress Session; recorded in 1940

=== Selected compilations ===
- Blind Willie McTell 1927–1933: The Early Years, Yazoo L-1005 (1968)
- Blind Willie McTell 1949: Trying to Get Home, Biograph BLP-12008 (1969)
- King of the Georgia Blues Singers (1929–1935), Roots RL-324 (1969)
- Atlanta Twelve String, Atlantic SD-7224 (1972)
- Death Cell Blues, Biograph BLP-C-14 (1973)
- Blind Willie McTell: 1927–1935, Yazoo L-1037 (1974)
- Blind Willie McTell: 1927–1949, The Remaining Titles, Wolf WSE 102 (1982)
- Blues in the Dark, MCA 1368 (1983)
- Complete Recorded Works in Chronological Order, vol. 1, Document DOCD-5006 (1990)
- Complete Recorded Works in Chronological Order, vol. 2, Document DOCD-5007 (1990)
- Complete Recorded Works in Chronological Order, vol. 3, Document DOCD-5008 (1990)
  - These three albums were issued together as the box set Statesboro Blues, Document DOCD-5677 (1990)
- Complete Library of Congress Recordings in Chronological Order, RST Blues Documents BDCD-6001 (1990)
- Pig 'n Whistle Red, Biograph BCD 126 (1993)
- The Definitive Blind Willie McTell, Legacy C2K-53234 (1994)
- The Classic Years 1927–1940, JSP JSP7711 (2003)
- King of the Georgia Blues, Snapper SBLUECD504X (2007)
- Last Sessions, Prestige Bluesville lp 1040, (1961), Original Blues Classics OBC CD-517-2, (1992)

=== Selected compilations with other artists ===
- Blind Willie McTell/Memphis Minnie: Love Changin' Blues, Biograph BLP-12035 (1971)
- Atlanta Blues 1933, JEMF 106 (1979)
- Blind Willie McTell and Curley Weaver: The Post-War Years, RST Blues Documents BDCD 6014 (1990)
- Classic Blues Artwork from the 1920s, vol. 5, Blues Images – BIM-105 (2007)

== Footnotes ==
=== Works cited ===
- Gray, Michael (2009). Hand Me My Travelin' Shoes. Chicago Review Press. ISBN 978-1-56976-337-7.

=== General references ===
- Bastin, Bruce. Red River Blues: The Blues Tradition in the Southeast. Urbana and Chicago: University of Illinois Press, 1986, 1995. ISBN 0-252-06521-2, ISBN 978-0-252-06521-7.
- Charters, Samuel, ed. Sweet as the Showers of Rain. Oak Publications, 1977, Chapter 13: Willie McTell pp, 120–131.
