= Little Sammy Davis =

- Davis in 2008

Background information
- Also known as: Little Sam Davis, Harmonica Sammy Davis
- Born: Sammy Davis; November 28, 1928; Winona, Mississippi, U.S.
- Died: February 16, 2018 (aged 89) Middletown, New York, U.S.
- Genres: Blues R&B, Country
- Occupations: Musician, songwriter.
- Instruments: Vocals, harmonica, guitar
- Years active: 1940s–2018
- Labels: Delmark Records, Trix Records, Rockin' Records, Fat Fritz Records, Mr. Fritz Records
- Formerly of: Levon Helm Band
- Website: facebook.com/artist/littlesammydavis

Little Sammy Davis (November 28, 1928 – February 16, 2018) was an American blues musician based in New York's Hudson Valley. His music career began in the 1940s, but he was not widely known until the mid-1990s, when he began working in radio, singing, performing on tour, and recording studio albums.

== Early life and career ==
Davis was born in Winona, Mississippi, and raised in a one-room shack. He learned to play the harmonica at the age of eight. He eventually left home and settled in Florida, where he continued to play the blues in the Miami area and worked in orange groves and sawmills to make ends meet.

Throughout the 1940s and 1950s, Davis traveled with medicine shows and played with blues musicians such as Pinetop Perkins and Ike Turner. He spent a total of nine years on the road with Earl Hooker, including with the short-lived band of Hooker, Turner, Perkins and Albert King, which broke up when Hooker and King, two titans of blues guitar, came to blows. Davis and Hooker recorded four sides for Henry Stone's Rockin' label in 1952 and 1953, billed as Little Sam Davis.

In the late 1950s, Davis lived in Chicago, Illinois, performing with Muddy Waters, Jimmy Reed and occasionally fronting Little Walter's band, the Aces, when Walter didn't show up for an engagement. At some point, word got out that "some guy looks and plays just like Walter and people think he is Little Walter". One night, as Davis performed on stage accompanied by Hooker, he spotted a policeman at the back of the club. Walter and the officer waited for Davis to finish his set, and when he left the stage, he was arrested on the spot. Davis later said, "Walter was a good guy and told me that yes, you do indeed sound just like me but you can't be going around letting people think you are me". Davis was locked up and spent a night in jail before Walter dropped the charges, and the two remained friends for the rest of Walter's life.

Davis later married and settled in Poughkeepsie, New York, where he was "discovered" by a local musician, Dan DelSanto of the Arm Bros. Dan had been looking around locally for blues players for his friend Pete Lowry, a local folklorist. During this time he recorded a session for Lowry's Trix Records at Davis's apartment in 1971, which resulted in one 45-rpm single, "Someday Blues" backed with "Sam's Swing". Davis also played harmonica on some of the recordings made by Eddie Kirkland for Trix in 1972 at a studio in Mink Hollow, New York. After the sudden death of his wife in 1972/73, Davis stopped playing and dropped out of the music scene for the next two decades, despite the efforts of Little Eliot Lloyd, Lowry, and others to persuade him to play. Eventually, no one knew where Davis was or whether he was alive or dead; some said he had gone back to Mississippi or maybe Florida. He had disappeared.

== Comeback ==
In 1990, a local disc jockey, Doug Price, was getting a haircut at a barber shop in Poughkeepsie, New York, when he heard rumors that Davis was sitting in at a blues jam at the Side Track Inn. Price mentioned Davis's story and played some of his old recordings on WVKR. Then one night, Brad Scribner was hired to play drums at the blues jam, and when Davis got up to play, Scribner was amazed at what he saw and heard. He went home to tell his brother Fred, who had been performing blues instrumentals for the radio disc jockey Don Imus and had been looking for a singer to progress from background instrumentals to being a featured guest on Imus's radio program, Imus in the Morning.

Fred Scribner arranged to bring Davis and Midnight Slim into Tom Veneble's Recording Studio in Walden, New York, to record a fresh batch of material, including "Sitting on Top of the World", the classic song recorded by the Mississippi Sheiks and Howlin' Wolf. Imus interviewed Davis and Scribner live via telephone, and they were an instant hit. Subsequently, Imus invited them to perform live in the studio regularly on his program, at WFAN Radio in New York City. The New York Daily News proclaimed the next day, "Little Sammy Davis and Fred Scribner score on the Imus show". Davis and Scribner started to perform regularly, soon earning the title of house band for the Imus program for years to come. Imus, in his trademark style, later quipped that Davis had "more harmonicas than teeth" and that Fred looked like a manager of an Ace Hardware Store.

Capitalizing on this fame, Davis and Midnight Slim (Fred Scribner) toured, playing the best blues clubs and at colleges and blues festivals on the East Coast and venturing out to the West Coast on occasion as radio and television stations (MSNBC) around the United States joined on. In 1996 Davis released his first full-length album, I Ain't Lyin, for Delmark Records, with Fred Scribner producing, playing guitar and co-writing songs, Brad Scribner on drums, Brad Lee Sexton on bass, and Tom Hunter on piano . The record was nominated for a W. C. Handy Award and earned Davis a "comeback artist of the year award" from Living Blues magazine. Davis and Scribner released a second album, Ten Years and Forty Days, on their own label, Fat Fritz Records. As the house band for the Imus program, the band donated their time and talent for 10 years to the annual radio-telethon to support the Tomorrows Children's Fund, for the benefit of children with cancer. As the years went by, other charitable organizations came on board, such as the S.I.D.S Foundation and the Imus Ranch for Children (with terminal illnesses). Their run ended in 2001 with the destruction of the World Trade Center on 9/11, which shadowed over the "Winter Atrium" in the World Financial Center where the telethons were held. They continued to be guests on the Imus Show from time to time .

Around this time, a former guitar student of Scribner's, John Rocklin, brought Davis to Woodstock, New York, to see Levon Helm, the former drummer and vocalist of The Band. Helm made friends with Davis. Davis began joining him for performances at Helm's home in Woodstock and on tour with Levon Helm and the Barn Burners. In 2006 Davis persuaded Helm that Fred Scribner would be the right choice on guitar. Scribner was hired, and the name of the group was changed to the Levon Helm Band. Helm started holding concerts at his home; recordings of some of these performances were released on the album Midnight Ramble Sessions, Volume One.

The Levon Helm Band starring Little Sammy Davis with Fred Scribner on guitar performed on the Imus Show, promoting the release of Midnight Ramble Sessions, Volume One.

In 2002, Arlen Tarlofsky produced and directed the documentary film Little Sammy Davis, about Davis's life and music. The film was the jury selection at the London Film Festival and the Woodstock International Film Festival, and it won the Audience Recognition Award at the AFI/Silverdocs Discovery Channel Documentary Film Festival.

In 2008, Davis suffered a stroke. He was able to resume performing the following spring. He was no longer able to travel on the road but performed every Saturday at Levon Helm's "Midnight Ramble". A second stroke less than a year later left him partially paralyzed.

Davis resided in a nursing home rehab unit in Middletown, New York. He died in Middletown on February 16, 2018, at the age of 89.

== Discography ==
=== Singles ===
- "Goin' Home To Mother" / "1958 Blues" (Rockin' 512) 1953 - As "Little Sam Davis"
- "She's So Good To Me" / "Goin' To New Orleans" (Rockin' 519) 1953 - As "Little Sam Davis"
- "Sam's Swing" / "Someday Blues" (Trix 4505) 1971 - As "Harmonica Sammy Davis"

=== Albums ===
- I Ain't Lyin' (Delmark DE-682) 1995
- The Midnight Ramble Sessions Volume One (Levon Helm Studios) 2005 - as "Levon Helm Band starring Little Sammy Davis"
- Ten Years and Forty Days (Fat Fritz FFR5771) 2008
- Travelin' Man (Fat Fritz 0002) 2009
