= Ruby Glaze =

- Also known as: Ruby Glaze
- Origin: Atlanta, Georgia
- Occupation: Singer
- Years active: 1932
- Label: RCA-Victor

Ruby Glaze recorded with ‘Hot Shot Willie’ (Blind Willie McTell) starting very early in the morning on February 22, 1932 at Egleston Auditorium in Atlanta for Ralph Peer and RCA-Victor. The four songs recorded that day are among the rarest Blind Willie McTell recordings and were his last with Ralph Peer. The songs are also of particular interest because of the mystery surrounding the identity of Ruby Glaze.

== Identity ==
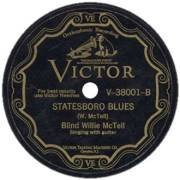
A previous RCA-Victor record by Blind Willie McTell that became his greatest hit

Willie McTell biographer Michael Gray stated that Kate McTell had claimed that she was Ruby Glaze, and as a result became a leading contender for some time. In an interview conducted in the 1970s with musicologist David Evans and his family, Kate McTell claimed that she was Ruby Glaze. Evans found this unlikely since they did not marry until 1934. Michael Gray found major inconsistencies from Kate's stories in her interview with Evans, such as where she attended school and her age when the couple met. He got the impression when listening to her interviews that she was angling to claim credit for being Ruby Glaze.

In 1986, Bruce Bastin noted that there remained significant doubt but found similarities between Glaze's spoken parts in "Searching the Desert for the Blues" and the ones in the McTells' recording of "Ticket Agent Blues" in 1935. Michael Gray strongly disagreed, arguing that the singing persona of Ruby Glaze is much more confident, warm, relaxed, professional and sexier than the shrill, coy, self-conscious, and amateurish voice of Kate McTell.

Gray also searched for a ‘Ruby Glaze’ in the 1930 census for Atlanta as well as the Social Security Deaths Index without finding a ‘suitable match.'

== Discography ==
- "Rollin' mama blues"
- "Lonesome day blues"
- "Let me scoop for you"
- "Searching the desert for the blues"

== Cited works ==
- Bastin, B. Red River Blues: The Blues Tradition in the Southeast. 1986. Illini Books. ISBN 0-252-01213-5. Retrieved 2011-09-22.
- Gray, M. Hand Me My Travelin' Shoes: In Search of Blind Willie McTell. 2007. Bloomsbury Publishing, London. ISBN 978-1-55652-975-7. Retrieved 2011-09-22.
