= McTell =

McTell is a surname. Notable people with the surname include:

- Blind Willie McTell (1898–1959), American blues singer, songwriter, and guitarist
- Kate McTell (1911–1991), American blues musician and nurse from Jefferson County, Georgia; wife of Blind Willie
- Ralph McTell (born 1944), English singer-songwriter and acoustic guitar player
