= Henry "Rufe" Johnson =

American singer

- Also known as: Rooster, Rufe
- Born: Henry Johnson; October 2, 1908; Bogansville, South Carolina, United States
- Died: February 4, 1974 (aged 65) Union, South Carolina, United States
- Genres: Piedmont blues; folk; gospel
- Occupations: Singer; guitarist; pianist; banjo player; harmonica player; songwriter
- Instruments: Guitar; piano; harmonica; banjo; human voice
- Years active: 1930s–1974
- Labels: Trix Records; Flyright Records

Henry "Rufe" Johnson (October 2, 1908 – February 4, 1974), was an American Piedmont blues guitarist, harmonica player, pianist, banjo player, singer and songwriter. On occasion he played slide guitar with a pocket knife. He finally found a larger audience with his 1973 album, The Union County Flash! His fame was short-lived, as he died months after its release.

== Life and career ==
Johnson was born in the small settlement of Bogansville, near to the towns of Union and Jonesville, South Carolina. His elder brother, Roosevelt, taught Johnson the rudiments of guitar playing, and he was further instructed by his cousin Thelmon Johnson. His childhood nickname, Rufe, which stayed with him throughout his life, was a shortening of Rooster. He learned to play in standard tuning and mainly played gospel songs, but his family's record collection also exposed him to secular music, such as that of Blind Lemon Jefferson, Blind Blake and later Blind Boy Fuller. He also got the opportunity to play alongside several white musicians. He expanded his repertoire in 1933, when he taught himself to play the piano, and he played at a local church for several years. Johnson performed with two vocal groups, the West Spring Friendly Four and the Silver Star Quartet, which were broadcast on the radio stations WPSA and WBSU, respectively.

In 1952, he moved from working on a farm to a hospital job, while also making a gradual transition to playing more secular material, on a part-time basis. Discovered by blues historians, Johnson started to give solo concerts, performed on the radio, and joined up musically with his childhood friend Peg Leg Sam.

Following recording sessions in November and December 1972, his album The Union County Flash! was issued by Trix Records in 1973. He also provided guitar and vocals, along with Baby Tate, for a couple of tracks on Peg Leg Sam's album Medicine Show Man, released in the same year.

Johnson died of kidney failure in Union, South Carolina, on February 4, 1974, age 65.

== Discography ==
=== CD albums ===
Year	Title	Record label
1995	The Union County Flash!	Trix Records

== See also ==
- List of Piedmont blues musicians
