= Trice (surname) =

Trice is a surname found in English-speaking countries.

Notable people bearing it include:

- Amelia Trice (1936–2011), Native American leader
- Bob Trice (1926–1988), pitcher for Philadelphia and Kansas City Athletics
- Bralen Trice – American football player (born 2001)
- Cory Trice (born 2000), American football player
- D'Mitrik Trice – American basketball player
- Jack Trice (1902–1923), American football player
- Obie Trice (born 1977), American rapper
- Richard Trice (1917–2000), American blues guitarist, singer and songwriter
- Rocky Trice – American basketball player
- Travis Trice (born 1993), American basketball player
- Tyrone Trice (born 1963), American boxer
- Virgil Garnett Trice Jr. – African-American chemical engineer
- Wally Trice (born 1966), American baseball player
- Willie Trice (1908–1976), American blues guitarist, singer and songwriter
