= Trice =

Trice may refer to:

- La Trice Classic
- Human names:
  - Trice (surname)
  - Trice Harvey (1936–2017), American politician
- TrICE, cosmic ray telescope with formal name Track Imaging Cherenkov Experiment
- Trice (trimaran), innovative sailboat
