= Peter Lowry =

Peter Lowry may refer to:

- Peter B. Lowry (1941–2022), American folklorist, writer, record producer, ethnomusicologist, historian, photographer, forensic musicologist, and teacher
- Peter Lowry (soccer) (born 1985), American former soccer player
