= Peg Leg Sam =

- Born: Arthur Jackson; December 28, 1911; Jonesville, South Carolina, United States
- Died: October 27, 1977 (aged 65) Jonesville, South Carolina, United States
- Genres: Blues
- Occupations: Singer, musician, entertainer
- Instruments: Vocals, harmonica
- Years active: 1920s–1970s

Arthur Jackson, known as Peg Leg Sam (December 28, 1911 – October 27, 1977) was an American country blues harmonicist, singer and comedian. He recorded "Fox Chase" and "John Henry" and worked in medicine shows. He gained his nickname following an accident whilst hoboing in 1930.

== Biography ==
Arthur Jackson was born in Jonesville, South Carolina, the fourth of six children of David Jackson, a farmer and native of Virginia, and Emma Jackson. His paternal great-grandmother, Racheal Williams, was born 1810 in Virginia and was commonly referred to as a mulatto. She may have had a white mother or father (more likely a white father, as would have been more typical of the period).

Peg Leg Sam taught himself to play harmonica as a small child. He left home at the age of 12 and never stopped roving. He shined shoes, worked as a houseboy, cooked on ships, hoboed, and then made a living busking on street corners. He lost his leg in 1930, trying to hop a train but made a peg out of a fencepost, bound it to his stub with a leather belt, and kept moving.

He joined the medicine show circuit in 1937, often performing with Pink Anderson. His ability to play two harmonicas at once (while one went in and out of his mouth) made him an attraction; he could also play notes on a harmonica with his nose.

Peg Leg Sam married Theo S. Jackson, who was 18 years his senior and the mother of Herbert Miller and Katherine Miller, both natives of Tennessee. Peg Leg Sam gave his last medicine-show performance in 1972 in North Carolina but continued to appear at music festivals in his final years. In 1973, his childhood friend, Henry "Rufe" Johnson, supplied both guitar and vocals, as did Baby Tate, to a couple of tracks on Peg Leg Sam's album, Medicine Show Man.

He died in Jonesville in October 1977, at the age of 65.

== Documentary ==
A biography of Peg Leg Sam, Born for Hard Luck, was released by Tom Davenport in 1976. An excerpt from the documentary appears in the French film, Le Fabuleux Destin d'Amélie Poulain.

== Discography ==
- Medicine Show Man (Trix Records, 1973)
- The Last Medicine Show (featuring Chief Thundercloud) (Flyright Records, 1974)
- Joshua (featuring Louisiana Red) (1975)
- Early in the Morning (featuring Louisiana Red) (1996)
- Kickin' It (2000)

== See also ==
- Pink Anderson
- Eddie Mapp
- Baby Tate
