= Baby Tate =

Baby Tate can refer to:

- Baby Tate (rapper), stage name of the American rapper, born Tate Sequoya Farris
- Baby Tate (guitarist) (1916–1972), American Piedmont blues guitarist
