= Magpie Records =

British label

Magpie Records is a British record label set up in 1976 by Bruce Bastin. It was owned by Interstate Music. It specialises in re-issuing pre and post war blues and jazz recordings.

The New Grove Dictionary of Jazz calls the series Piano Blues "of considerable jazz interest." This is a 21-volume set edited and produced by Francis Wilford-Smith and drawn largely from his own collection which systematically rescued hundreds of rare piano-driven blues sides.

Magpie also released important single-artist and thematic blues albums, including by Robert Wilkins, Bumble Bee Slim and Kokomo Arnold.

== See also ==
- Lists of record labels
