= Willie Trice =

American songwriter (1908–1976)

- Also known as: Welly Trice, Willy Trice
- Born: William Augusta Trice; February 10, 1908; Chapel Hill, North Carolina, United States
- Died: December 11, 1976 (aged 68) Durham, North Carolina, United States
- Genres: Blues
- Occupations: Guitarist, singer, songwriter
- Instruments: Guitar, human voice
- Years active: 1930s–1976
- Labels: Decca, Trix

William Augusta Trice (February 10, 1908 – December 11, 1976) was an American blues guitarist, singer and songwriter. He released two singles and an album. He remained loyal to his native North Carolina and its regional blues style, often referred to as Piedmont blues, East Coast blues, or more generally country blues.

== Life and career ==
Trice was born in Chapel Hill, North Carolina, probably in 1908; some sources state 1910 or 1911. The family had moved to Raleigh by 1920.

Both of Trice's parents played music—his mother played the organ at church functions, and his father was a music teacher—but it was mainly his uncle who taught Willie the rudiments of blues guitar playing. His biggest influence was Reverend Gary Davis, also known as Blind Gary Davis. Trice formed a duo with his younger brother, Richard Trice, in Durham, North Carolina, in the 1930s. They and began playing a ragtime-influenced blues, which was common in the Carolinas in that period. The brothers befriended Blind Boy Fuller in the 1933, and it was this relationship that led them to enter a recording studio.

In July 1937, Trice recorded two sides (Issued as being by Welly Trice) for Decca Records in New York, with his brother Richard playing second guitar: "Come On in Here Mama" and "Let Her Go God Bless Her". Without any commercial success ensuing, Trice did not record again until the 1970s. However, he was well known for playing locally in the 1930s and 1940s in North Carolina. In the late 1960s, both of his legs were amputated below the knee, as a result of the effects of diabetes.

In 1971, he recorded two songs he wrote, "Three Little Kittens Rag" and "One Dime Blues", for Trix Records, which were released as a single the following year. Between 1971 and December 1973, he recorded enough songs (several of which he wrote himself), for an album, Blue and Rag'd, released by Trix in 1975. It was re-released on CD twenty years later. In September 1972, Trice was interviewed by Bruce Bastin, as part of the latter's interest in the history of the blues in the southeastern United States.

Trice lived his whole life in the same area, continuing to play music as time and finances allowed.

Trice died at his home in Durham, North Carolina, in December 1976, at the age of 68. He was interred at Mount Sinai Baptist Church Cemetery, in Chapel Hill, North Carolina. His brother Richard, who died in 2000, was buried next to him.

== Discography ==
=== CD album ===
Year	Title	Record label	Notes
1995	Blue and Rag'd	Trix Records	Recorded between July 1971 and December 1973
