= Kissimmee Cobras =

Defunct American minor league baseball team

- 1985–2000; Kissimmee, Florida
Team logo
Cap insignia

Minor league affiliations
- Class: Class A Advanced
- League: Florida State League

Major league affiliations
- Team: Houston Astros

Minor league titles
- League titles (1): 1999

Team data
- Name: Kissimmee Cobras (1995–2000); Osceola Astros (1985–1994)
- Ballpark: Osceola County Stadium (1985-2000)

The Kissimmee Cobras were a Florida State League baseball team based in Kissimmee, Florida that played from 1995 to 2000. They were affiliated with the Houston Astros and played their home games at Osceola County Stadium. Prior to 1995, the team was known as the Osceola Astros from 1985 to 1994.

== Notable alumni ==
- Bobby Abreu (1993) 2 x MLB All-Star
- Manny Acta (1992, 1998-2000)
- Joaquin Andujar (1988) 4 x MLB All-Star
- Alan Ashby (1996)
- Lance Berkman (1997) 6 x MLB All-Star
- Ken Caminiti (1985) 3 x MLB All-Star; 1996 NL Most Valuable Player
- Ramón Castro (1995)
- Morgan Ensberg (1999) MLB All-Star
- Freddy Garcia (1997) 2 x MLB All-Star; AL ERA Title
- Luis Gonzalez (1989) 5 x MLB All-Star
- Todd Jones (1990-1991) MLB All-Star
- Brad Lidge (1999-2000) 2 x MLB All-Star
- Julio Lugo (1998)
- Kenny Lofton (1990) 6 x MLB All-Star
- Wade Miller (1997)
- Melvin Mora (1994) 2 x MLB All-Star
- Roy Oswalt
- Rick Rhoden (1989) 2 x MLB All-Star
- Scott Servais (1989)

== Season by season analysis ==
=== 1985 ===
In 1985, the Astros drew 38,082 fans - seventh most in the 11 team league. Under manager Dave Cripe, they went 77-58, winning the Central Division of the Florida State League. They lost in the playoffs two games to one to the Fort Lauderdale Yankees. During the season, they outscored opponents 625-536. Standout performers on the 1985 team include Rob Mallicoat, who went 16-6 with a 1.36 ERA and 158 strikeouts in 179 innings of work. He gave up only 119 hits. Closer Mark Baker led the league with 24 saves.

=== 1986 ===
The Astros finished 10th in the 12 team league in attendance, drawing 36,135 fans. Under manager Tom Wiedenbauer, they went only 59-78, 26 games out of first place. They were outscored 623-567. Some standout performers include John Fishel, who hit .269 with 82 runs, 83 RBI and 36 doubles - which led the team. Dody Rather went 12-9 with a 3.21 ERA, and Blaise Ilsley went 8-4 with a 1.77 ERA.

=== 1987 ===
Under new manager Ken Bolek, the Astros went 80-59 in 1987, winning the Central Division. Again, they lost to Fort Lauderdale in the playoffs, this time three games to one. They drew 38,068 fans, which was ninth most in the 14 team league, and they outscored opponents 662-488. Standout performers include Jose Cano, who went 15-3 with a 1.94 ERA. Jose Vargas went 11-8 with a 2.33 ERA, and Don Dunster went 7-4 with a 2.50 ERA. Brian Meyer saved 25 games and had a 1.99 ERA. Their hottest hitter was Calvin James, who had a .319 batting average.

=== 1988 ===
In 1988, the Astros went 44-26 in the first half and 39-28 in the second half. Not surprisingly, they had a new manager - Keith Bodie. They lost in the league championship game to the St. Lucie Mets. They drew 44,023 fans - 10th most in the 14 team league - and outscored opponents 622-495. A speedy team, they set a Florida State League record with 360 stolen bases as a team. Speedsters on the team include Lou Frazier, who stole 87 bases (and led the league in that category), Karl Rhodes, who stole 65 bases, Bert Hunter, who stole 54 bases and Trenidad Hubbard, who stole 44 bases. Pitcher Pedro DeLeon went 14-5 with a 2.44 ERA, providing a solid pitching performance.

=== 1989 ===
They went 72-65 under new manager Rick Sweet in 1989. They drew 53,586 fans - eighth most in the 14 team league - and they outscored opponents 587-557. Standout performers include Wally Trice, who went 16-4 with a 2.57 ERA and Andy Mota, who hit .319 with 28 stolen bases.

=== 1990 ===
From 1990 to 1992, they were managed by Sal Butera. They went 72-66 in 1990, drawing 46,421 fans - finishing 10th in the league in that category. They outscored opponents 603-576. Standout performers include Kenny Lofton, who hit .331 with 62 stolen bases and a league leading 159 hits, Jeff Juden, who went 10-1 with a 2.27 ERA and Gabriel Rodriguez, who went 12-5 with ten saves and a 1.68 ERA.

=== 1991 ===
In 1991, they went 64-63, drawing 48,341 fans and outscoring the opposition, 484-455. Top performers include John Massarelli, who hit .309, while Carl Grovom had a 1.51 ERA, Brian Griffiths went 4-3, 1.92, Ed Ponte went 7-6 with 10 saves, a 1.78 ERA while allowing only 43 hits in 76 innings pitched, Mark Small went 3-0, with 2 saves and a 1.61 ERA and Donne Wall went 6-3 with a 2.09 ERA.

=== 1992 ===
They went 72-62 in 1992. They made the playoffs, but lost to the Baseball City Royals in the semifinals. They outscored opponents 602-591, and they drew 49,857 fans. Standout performers include James Mouton, who led the league with 51 stolen bases, Sam Wood who hit .320 as a catcher and Chris Hill, who went 16-7 with a 2.93 ERA.

=== 1993 ===
Sal Butera was replaced by Tim Tolman, who would serve as their manager until their final season in 1994. They went only 56-74, being outscored 621-503. Standout performers were Bobby Abreu, who led the league in triples, Sam Wood, who hit .312 as catcher and Dennis Colon, who hit .316.

=== 1994 ===
1994 was the team's final season as the Osceola Astros. They went only 46-89, finishing last in the division and 35.5 games out of first place. They were outscored 691-506. They lacked any real standout performers, although Melvin Mora did hit .282 with 24 stolen bases.

=== Cobras ===
They were renamed the Kissimmee Cobras following the season. Cobra managers included Dave Engle (1995), Alan Ashby (1996), John Tamargo (1997) and Manny Acta (1998-2000). Major league All-Stars Lance Berkman, Morgan Ensberg, Freddy Garcia, Brad Lidge and Roy Oswalt played for the team. In 1999, the club won the Florida State League title.
