= David "Honeyboy" Edwards =

American blues guitarist and singer (1915–2011)

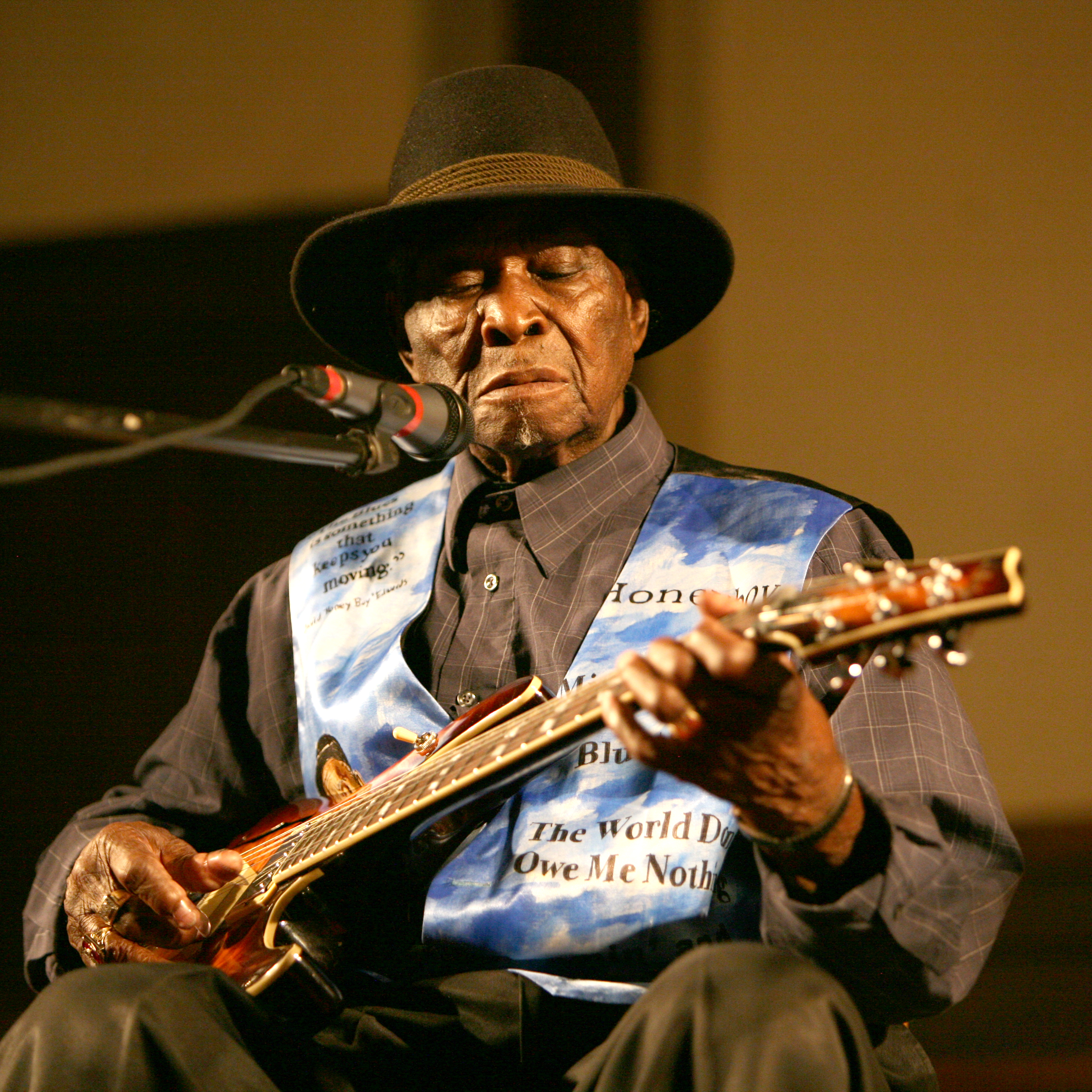
- Edwards performing in July 2006

Background information
- Also known as: Mr. Honey
- Born: David Edwards; June 28, 1915; Shaw, Mississippi, U.S.
- Died: August 29, 2011 (aged 96) Chicago, Illinois, U.S.
- Genres: Delta blues
- Occupations: Musician; songwriter
- Years active: 1930s–2011
- Labels: Earwig; Trix; Chess; Arc; APO
- Website: davidhoneyboyedwards.com

David "Honeyboy" Edwards (June 28, 1915 – August 29, 2011) was an American delta blues guitarist and singer from Mississippi.

== Biography ==
Edwards was born in Shaw, Mississippi. He learned to play music from his father, a guitarist and violinist. At the age of 14, he left home to travel with the bluesman Big Joe Williams, beginning life as an itinerant musician, which he maintained through the 1930s and 1940s. He performed with the famed blues musician Robert Johnson, with whom he developed a close friendship. Edwards was present on the night Johnson drank the poisoned whiskey that killed him, and his story has become the definitive version of Johnson's demise. Edwards also knew and played with other leading bluesmen in the Mississippi Delta, including Charley Patton, Tommy Johnson, and Johnny Shines. He described the itinerant bluesman's life:

On Saturday, somebody like me or Robert Johnson would go into one of these little towns, play for nickels and dimes. And sometimes, you know, you could be playin' and have such a big crowd that it would block the whole street. Then the police would come around, and then I'd go to another town and where I could play at. But most of the time, they would let you play. Then sometimes the man who owned a country store would give us something like a couple of dollars to play on a Saturday afternoon. We could hitchhike, transfer from truck to truck, or if we couldn't catch one of them, we'd go to the train yard, 'cause the railroad was all through that part of the country then...we might hop a freight, go to St. Louis or Chicago. Or we might hear about where a job was paying off – a highway crew, a railroad job, a levee camp there along the river, or some place in the country where a lot of people were workin' on a farm. You could go there and play and everybody would hand you some money. I didn't have a special place then. Anywhere was home. Where I do good, I stay. When it gets bad and dull, I'm gone.

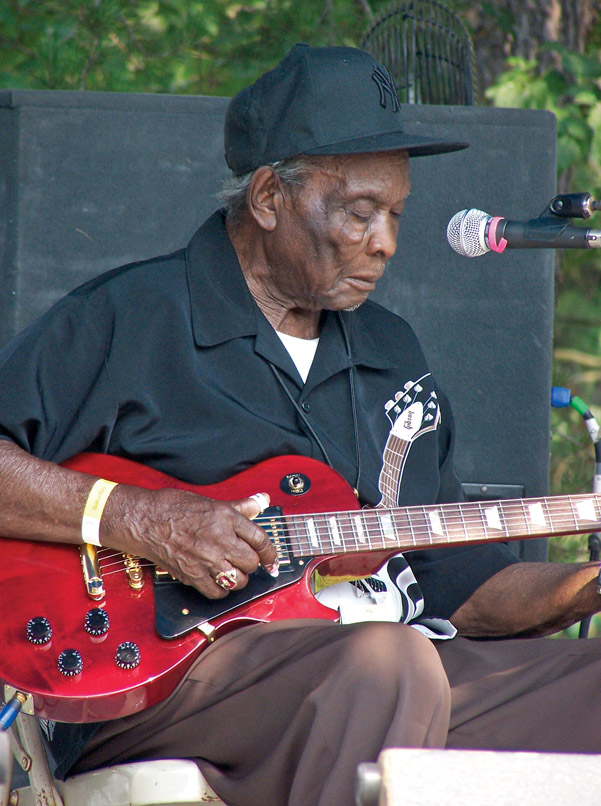
Edwards in performance, Somerset, Kentucky, July 19, 2008

The folklorist Alan Lomax recorded Edwards in Clarksdale, Mississippi, in 1942 for the Library of Congress. Edwards recorded 15 album sides of music, including his songs "Wind Howlin' Blues" and "The Army Blues". He did not record commercially until 1951, when he recorded "Who May Be Your Regular Be" for Arc under the name Mr. Honey. Edwards claimed to have written several well-known blues songs, including "Long Tall Woman Blues" and "Just Like Jesse James". His discography for the 1950s and 1960s amounts to nine songs from seven sessions. From 1974 to 1977, he recorded tracks for his first full-length LP, I've Been Around, released in 1978 by the independent label Trix Records and produced by the ethnomusicologist Peter B. Lowry. Kansas City Red played for Edwards for a brief period, and Earwig recorded them in 1981, along with Sunnyland Slim and Floyd Jones, for the album Old Friends Together for the First Time.

His autobiography, The World Don't Owe Me Nothing: The Life and Times of Delta Bluesman Honeyboy Edwards, published in 1997 by the Chicago Review Press, recounts his life from childhood, his travels through the American South, and his arrival in Chicago in the early 1950s. A companion CD with the same title was released by Earwig Music. His long association with the Earwig label and with his manager, Michael Frank, led to several late-career albums on various independent labels from the 1980s on. He also recorded at a church turned recording studio in Salina, Kansas, and released albums on the APO label. Edwards continued the rambling life he described in his autobiography, touring well into his 90s.

Between 1996 and 2000, he was nominated for eight W. C. Handy/Blues Music Awards, including for his albums White Windows, The World Don't Owe Me Nothin', Mississippi Delta Blues Man, and a 2007 album on which he appears with Robert Lockwood Jr., Henry Townsend and Pinetop Perkins titled Last of the Great Mississippi Delta Bluesmen: Live In Dallas. The latter album won a Grammy Award in 2008. He also won the W. C. Handy Blues Award in 2005 and the Blues Music Award in 2007 for Acoustic Blues Artist. In 2010, he received a Grammy Lifetime Achievement Award.

On July 17, 2011, Frank announced that Edwards would retire because of ill health.

Edwards died of congestive heart failure at his home on August 29, 2011, at about 3 a.m. According to events listings on the Metromix Chicago website, he had been scheduled to perform at noon that day, at the Jay Pritzker Pavilion in Chicago's Millennium Park.

== Discography ==
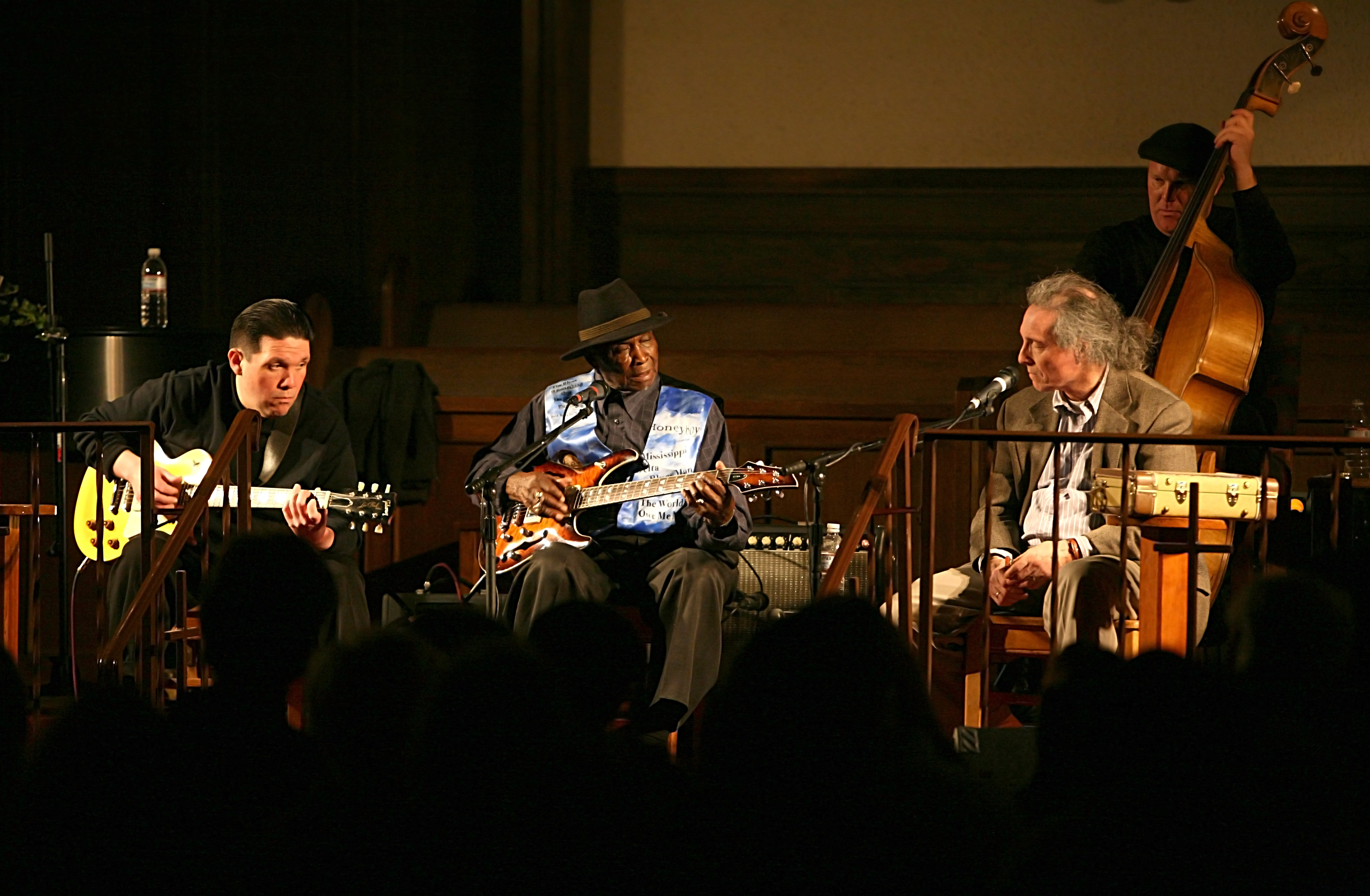
Edwards and band

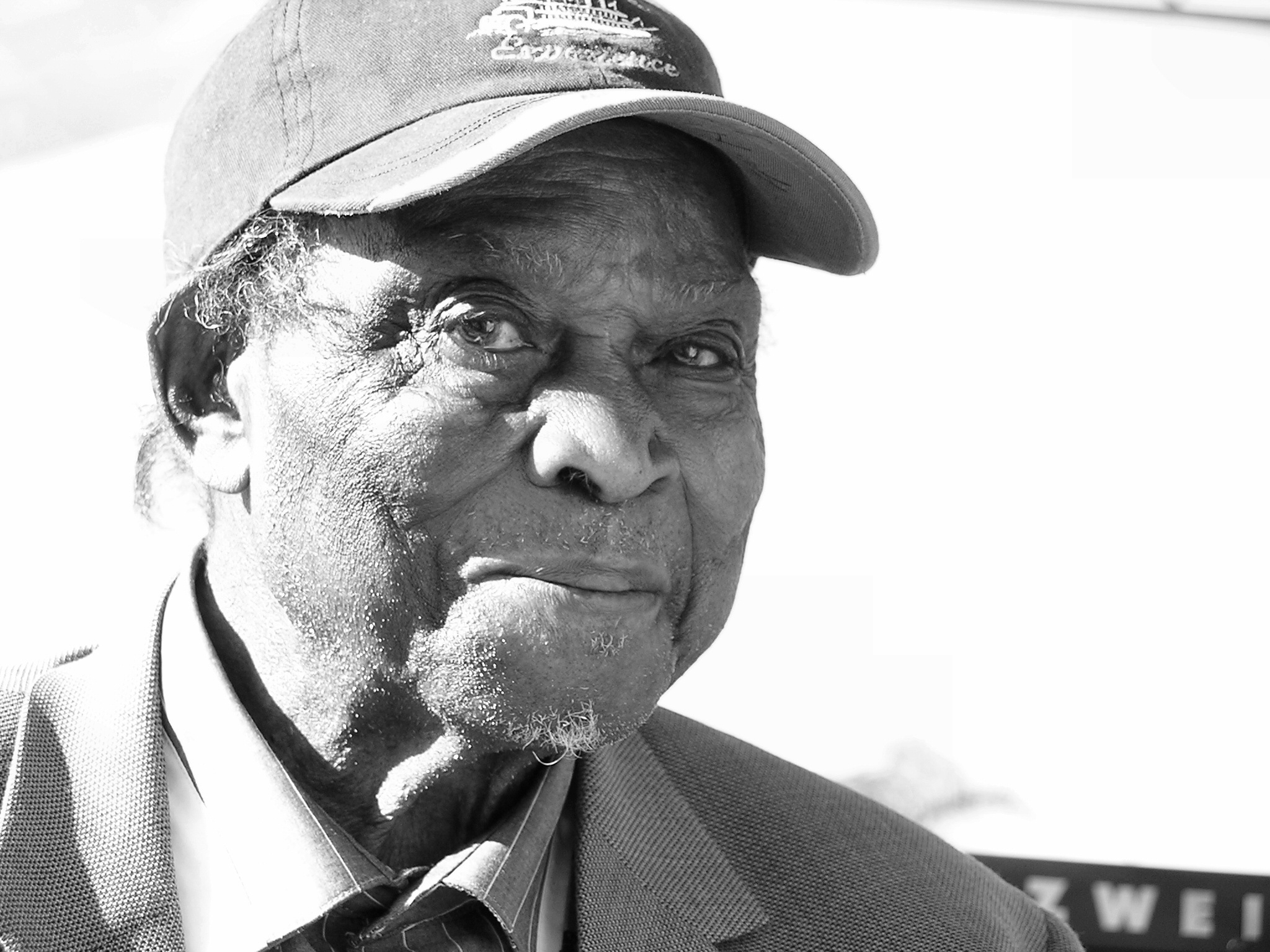
Edwards at the Adams Avenue Roots Festival, San Diego, 2005

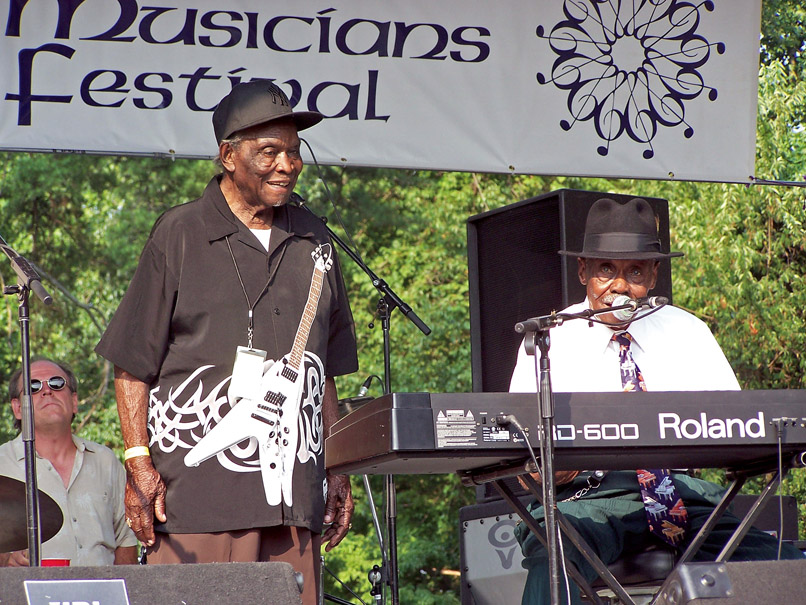
Edwards and Pinetop Perkins at the Master Musicians Festival, Somerset, Kentucky, July 19, 2008

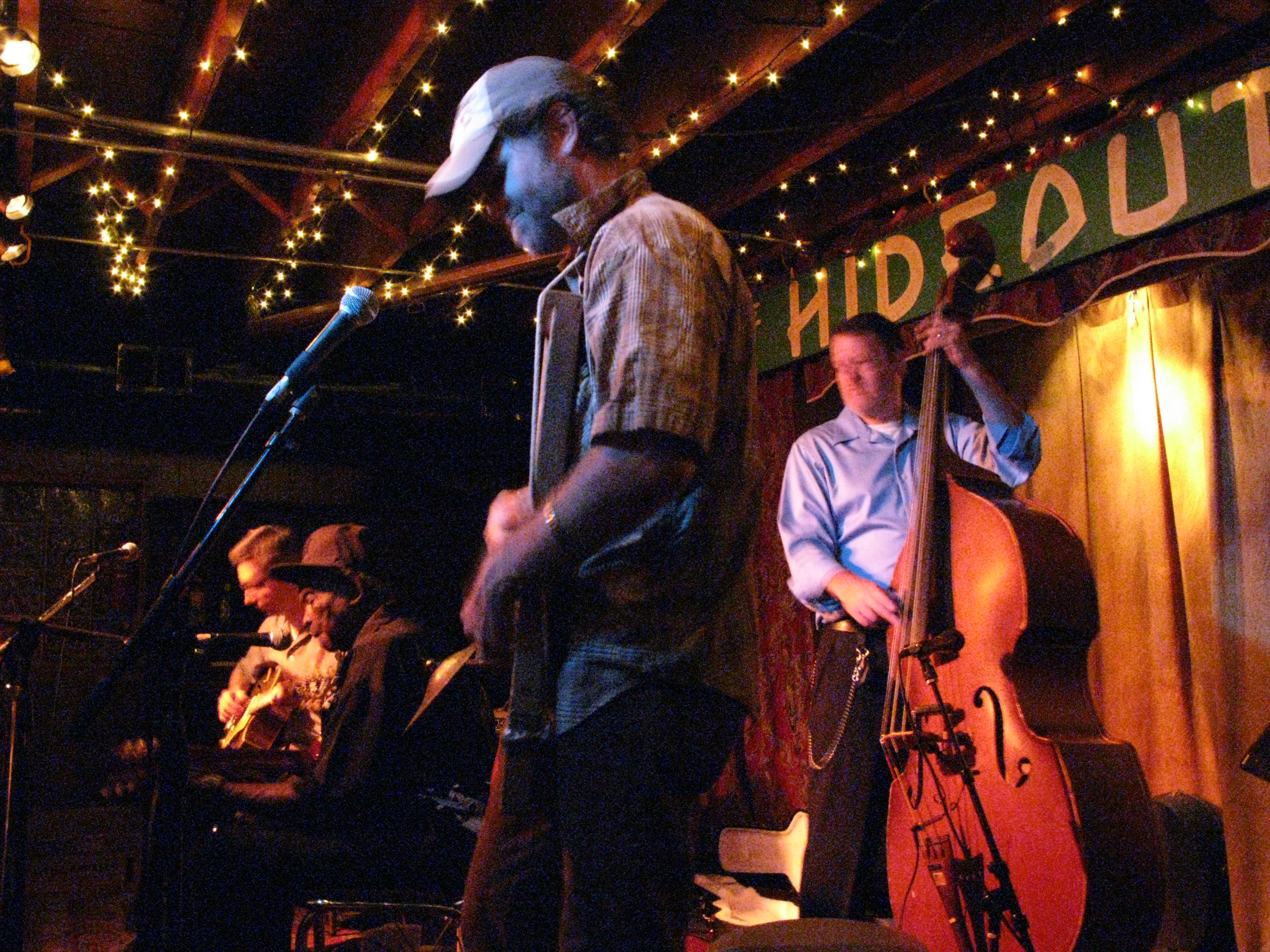
Edwards performing with Devil in a Woodpile at the Hideout, Chicago

- "Build a Cave"/"Who May Be Your Regular Be" (ARC, 1951)
- "Drop Down Mama" (Chess, 1953)
- I've Been Around (Trix Records, 1978, 1995)
- Mississippi Delta Bluesman (Folkways Records, 1979)
- Old Friends (Earwig, 1979)
- White Windows (Blue Suit, 1988)
- Delta Bluesman (Earwig/Indigo, 1992)
- Crawling Kingsnake (Testament, 1997)
- World Don't Owe Me Nothing, recorded live (Earwig, 1997)
- Don't Mistreat a Fool (Genes, 1999)
- Shake 'Em On Down (APO, 2000)
- Mississippi Delta Bluesman (reissue of 1979 album: Smithsonian Folkways Records, 2001)
- Back to the Roots (Wolf, 2001)
- Roamin' and Ramblin (Earwig, 2008)

== Film ==
In the 1991 documentary The Search for Robert Johnson, Edwards recounts stories about Johnson, including his murder.

Edwards is the subject of the 2010 award-winning film Honeyboy and the History of the Blues, from Free Range Studios, directed by Scott Taradash. The film features stories of his life from picking cotton as a sharecropper to traveling the world performing his music. Artists who appear in the film include Keith Richards, Robert Cray, Joe Perry, Lucinda Williams, B. B. King, Big Joe Williams, and Ace Atkins.

Edwards appeared in the 2007 film Walk Hard: The Dewey Cox Story.

== Awards and honors ==
- 1996: Induction into the Blues Hall of Fame
- 1998: Keeping the Blues Alive Award in literature, for The World Don't Owe Me Nothing
- 1999: Blues Hall of Fame inductee, Classics of Blues Literature, for The World Don't Owe Me Nothing
- 2002: National Heritage Fellowship, National Endowment for the Arts
- 2005: Acoustic Blues Artist of the Year, 26th W. C. Handy Blues Awards
- 2007: Acoustic Blues Artist of the Year, 28th Blues Music Award
- 2008: Grammy Award, Best Traditional Blues Album, for Last of the Great Mississippi Delta Bluesmen: Live In Dallas
- 2010: Grammy Lifetime Achievement Award
- 2010: Mississippi Governor's Award for Excellence in the Arts
- 2010: Lifetime Achievement Award, National Guitar Museum

== See also ==
- Crossroads Guitar Festival
- Dockery Plantation
- List of blues musicians
- List of Delta blues musicians
- Mississippi Blues Trail
- Notodden Blues Festival
