= Bluejeans & Moonbeams =

Studio album by Captain Beefheart and the Magic Band
- Released: November 1974
- Recorded: August 1974; Stronghold Sound Recorders, North Hollywood, CA
- Length: 36:50
- Labels: Mercury (US), Virgin (UK)
- Producer: Andy DiMartino

Captain Beefheart and the Magic Band chronology
Unconditionally Guaranteed (1974)	Bluejeans & Moonbeams (1974)	Bongo Fury (1975)

Professional ratings
Review scores
Source	Rating
AllMusic	2/5 stars
Christgau's Record Guide	B−

Bluejeans & Moonbeams is the ninth LP by Captain Beefheart and the Magic Band, released in 1974. Despite its uncharacteristically mainstream sound the album failed to chart.

== Production and legacy ==
Having no musical training or instrumental experience, throughout his career Van Vliet had relied on a musical director within the band who could translate his often unorthodox ideas into a form that was musically playable. This role had been successively filled by Alex St. Clair, John French, and Bill Harkleroad on his previous albums. With the entire Magic Band having quit after the recording of his previous album he no longer had such an intermediary. As a result, the album is generally considered the nadir of Van Vliet's musical career. One of the musicians, Micheal Smotherman, said "Don was just as confused as he could be throughout the whole process ... I would push his face up to the microphone and he would start singing. And when it was time to stop I would pull him back gently."

The album does, however, have its influence: an early White Stripes EP entitled Party of Special Things to Do (2001) contains three Beefheart covers, including this album's opening track. Kate Bush in a Smash Hits interview considered this one of her top ten albums. Mercury Rev covered "Observatory Crest" for a BBC session in 1999, which was released as B-side on their "Little Rhymes" single in 2002. Glen Hansard held this album in great regard.

John French listened to the album again in 2017, his apparent first listen since the album's release, and exclaimed that Van Vliet sounded almost lost in places, as if he didn't "really know exactly where to sing" – and that "it must have been difficult for him to function in that environment". According to French, Van Vliet said himself that the only good part about the album was the cover art by his cousin, Victor Hayden.

== Cover art ==
The album cover is a painting by Van Vliet's friend and cousin Victor Hayden, who featured on Trout Mask Replica with the nickname Beefheart bestowed upon him, The Mascara Snake.

== Track listing ==
Side one
No.	Title	Writer(s)	Length
1.	"Party of Special Things to Do"	Don Van Vliet, Elliot Ingber	2:48
2.	"Same Old Blues"	J. J. Cale	4:00
3.	"Observatory Crest"	Van Vliet, E. Ingber	3:32
4.	"Pompadour Swamp"	Van Vliet	3:32
5.	"Captain's Holiday"	Richard Feldman, Walt Richmond, Stephen Hickerson, Chuck Blackwell	5:43

Side two
No.	Title	Writer(s)	Length
1.	"Rock 'n Roll's Evil Doll"	Van Vliet, Mark Gibbons, Ira Ingber	3:20
2.	"Further Than We've Gone"	Van Vliet	5:31
3.	"Twist ah Luck"	Van Vliet, Gibbons, I. Ingber	3:22
4.	"Bluejeans & Moonbeams"	Van Vliet	5:02

== Personnel ==
The musicians in this version of the Magic Band appear on no other Beefheart album. Several of those who had played on Unconditionally Guaranteed and earlier albums had left to form Mallard.

- Captain Beefheart (Don Van Vliet) – vocals, harmonica
- Dean Smith – guitar, bottleneck guitar
- Micheal Smotherman – keyboards, backing vocals
- Ty Grimes – percussion

Additional personnel

- Ira Ingber – bass
- Bob West – bass on "Observatory Crest"
- Gene Pello – drums
- Jimmy Caravan – keyboard, star machine
- Mark Gibbons – keyboards

The personnel for "Captain's Holiday" are Tulsa musicians Chuck Blackwell - drums; Steve Hickerson - guitar; Richard Feldman - bass and Walt Richmond (of the Tractors) - piano. They are credited as the composers of the track. They played with Leon Russell; JJ Cale amongst others The track was reportedly found on a discarded reel in the studio. The harmonica on the track is not played by Captain Beefheart (by his own admission).
