= Party of Special Things to Do =

Single by the White Stripes
- Released: December 2000
- Recorded: 2000
- Genre: Garage rock
- Length: 6:59
- Label: Sub Pop
- Songwriters: Don Van Vliet, Elliot Ingber
- Producer: Jack White

The White Stripes singles chronology
"Lord, Send Me an Angel" (2000)	"Party of Special Things to Do" (2000)	"Hotel Yorba" (2001)

Professional ratings
Review scores
Source	Rating
AllMusic	1.5/5 stars

"Party of Special Things to Do" is a song by Captain Beefheart from the album Bluejeans & Moonbeams (1974). It was covered and released as a 7" single by Detroit garage rock band the White Stripes. Their record also contains two other covers of Captain Beefheart, who helped inspire Jack White's distinct musical sound. The recording was released in December 2000 as part of the Sub Pop Singles Club in a limited edition pressing of 1,300 copies on half-red, half-white vinyl.

"Party of Special Things to Do" was reissued by Third Man Records in early 2011 as a part of their Vault subscription service. The limited edition 7" record was pressed as a tri-color record in equal parts red, black and white.

== Background and recording ==
The White Stripes covered "China Pig" from Beefheart's experimental 1969 album Trout Mask Replica in an acoustic blues rendition. Jack White considers Trout Mask Replica to be "one of the most unique records in music history." "Ashtray Heart" (from 1980's Doc at the Radar Station) and "Party of Special Things to Do" (from the aforementioned Bluejeans & Moonbeams) were recorded straight into the mixing console with fuzz guitar and bass guitar.

== Track listing ==
No.	Title	Writer(s)	Length
1.	"Party of Special Things to Do" (Captain Beefheart cover)	Don Van Vliet; Elliot Ingber; Andrew Frank DiMartino Jr.	2:50
2.	"China Pig" (Captain Beefheart cover)	Van Vliet	1:24
3.	"Ashtray Heart" (Captain Beefheart cover)	Van Vliet	2:45
