= McWhirter House =

Historic house in South Carolina, United States

- U.S. National Register of Historic Places
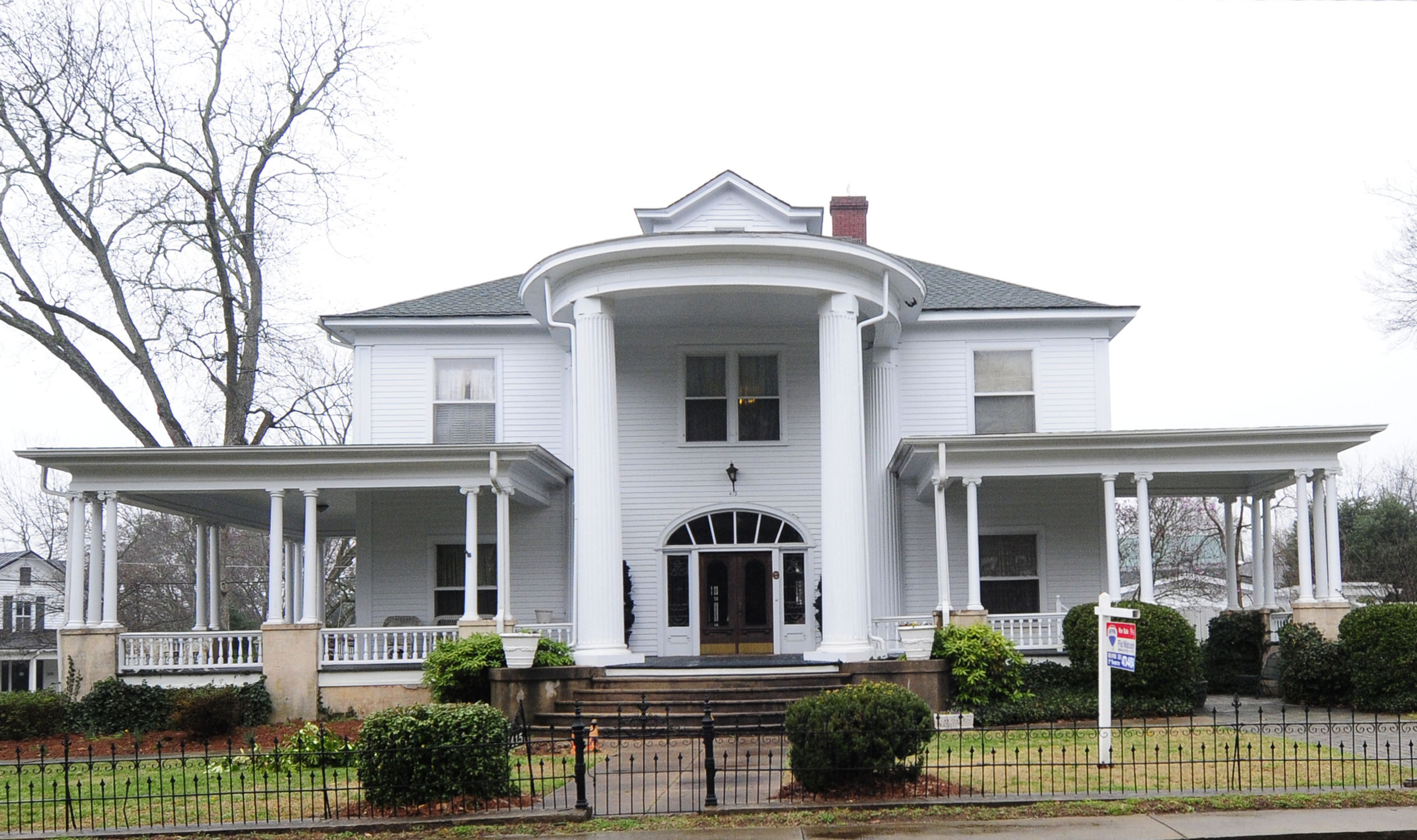
- McWhirter House, March 2012

- Location within South Carolina Location within the United States
- Location: 415 Pacolet St., Jonesville, South Carolina
- Coordinates: 34°49′59″N 81°40′54″W
- Area: less than one acre
- Built: 1909
- Architect: Cunningham, Joseph
- Architectural style: Classical Revival
- NRHP reference No.: 03000272
- Added to NRHP: April 18, 2003

McWhirter House is a historic home located at Jonesville, Union County, South Carolina. It was built in 1909, and is a two-story, frame Classical Revival style dwelling. It features a full-height porch supported by classical columns, that is symmetrically balanced with side porches accented with classical detailing.

It was added to the National Register of Historic Places in 2003.
