= Osceola County Stadium =

Florida outdoor sports venue

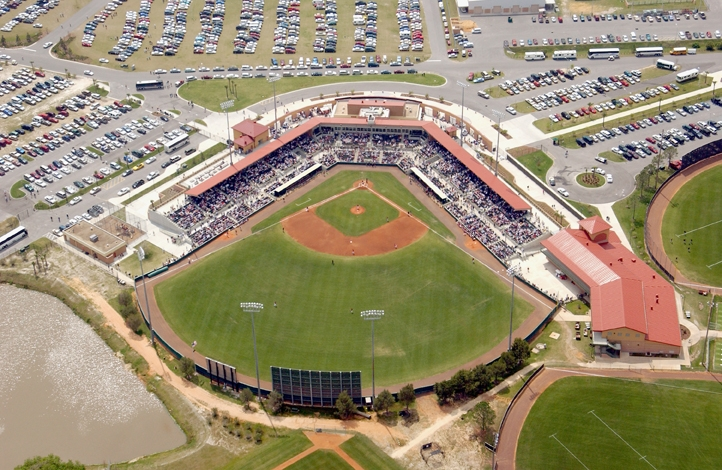
- Circa 2004
- Interactive map of Osceola County Stadium
- Location: 631 Heritage Park Way; Kissimmee, FL 34744
- Coordinates: 28°17′54″N 81°21′50″W
- Owner: Osceola County
- Operator: Orlando City SC
- Capacity: 5,400
- Surface: Grass

Construction
- Opened: 1984
- Renovated: 2003, 2019

Tenants
- Osceola Astros (FSL) 1985–1994; Kissimmee Cobras (FSL) 1995–2000; A-Sun Tournament 1998–1999; Gulf Coast League Astros (GCL) 2009–2016; Houston Astros (MLB) (spring training) 1985–2016; Florida Fire Frogs (FSL) 2017–2019; Orlando City B (MLSNP) 2020, 2022–present

Osceola County Stadium is an outdoor sports venue located in Kissimmee, Florida, part of the wider Orlando City SC Training Ground at Osceola Heritage Park.

Originally a baseball park, it was converted into a soccer-specific stadium by Orlando City SC in 2019 to house the club's MLS Next Pro reserve team Orlando City B ahead of the 2020 season. It had previously served as the home field for the Class A Florida State League's Kissimmee Cobras (1995–2000), Osceola Astros (1985–1994) and Florida Fire Frogs (2017–2019).

== Renovations ==
The Osceola County Stadium and Complex underwent a significant renovation in 2003 at a price of US$18.4 million The renovation increased seating capacity, upgraded the press box, improved the clubhouses, and added "Autograph Alley" which is a popular feature of spring training events.

In May 2019, the Florida Fire Frogs accepted a half-million-dollar buyout from the county to leave at the end of the 2019 season. The stadium will be redeveloped to be part of a larger 20-acre (8.1 ha) training complex at Osceola Heritage Park for Orlando City SC of Major League Soccer to house its senior MLS team, USL League One reserve team and Development Academy. As well as the stadium, the training ground will also include four practice fields - three natural grass and one artificial turf - a fitness, training and recovery center; a players’ lounge; meal room and a film room as well as 30,000 square feet (2,800 m^{2}) of office space for working staff and facilities to support media operations.

== Other uses ==
The Houston Astros of Major League Baseball used the site for spring training between 1985 and 2016. The Astros' lease with the ballpark ended in 2017. The Astros and Washington Nationals moved into The Ballpark of The Palm Beaches in West Palm Beach in February 2017.

The Osceola County Complex was also home of the Jim Evans Academy of Professional Umpiring where many hopeful future major league umpires went to learn the trade. Additionally, it hosts numerous amateur baseball events throughout the remainder of the year in conjunction with the United States Specialty Sports Association, Triple Crown Sports, World Baseball Federation, and Promotion Sports.

The venue hosted the 1998 and 1999 Atlantic Sun Conference baseball tournaments, won by Florida International and Jacksonville, respectively.

In the mid-1990s Osceola County Stadium was planned to be the home of the yet-to-be named Central Florida team, a charter franchise of the United League (UL) which was a planned third league of Major League Baseball (MLB).

Osceola County Stadium hosted the Johnsonville American Cornhole League (ACL) Championships in 2018.

== Gallery ==
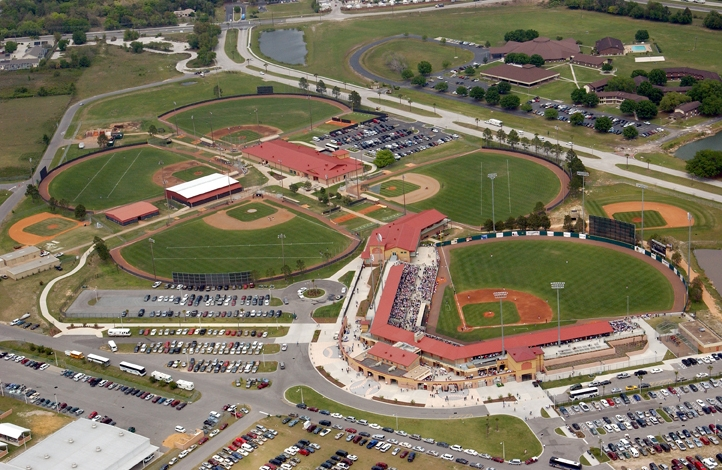
A view of additional fields at the complex, circa 2004
