= Kate McTell =

- Born: Ruthy Kate Williams; August 22, 1911; Savannah, Georgia, United States
- Origin: Atlanta, Georgia, United States
- Died: October 3, 1991 (aged 80) Augusta, Georgia, United States
- Genres: Blues, gospel
- Occupations: Musician, nurse
- Instrument: Vocals
- Years active: 1932–1940
- Labels: Decca, Vocalion

Kate McTell (born Ruthy Kate Williams; August 22, 1911 – October 3, 1991) was an American blues musician and nurse from Jefferson County, Georgia. She is known primarily as the former wife of the blues musician Blind Willie McTell, whom she accompanied vocally on several recordings. She might have also recorded under the pseudonym Ruby Glaze in Atlanta in February 1932, though that has been much discussed and disputed.

== Early life and marriage to Blind Willie McTell ==
Ruthy (later changed to Ruth) Kate Williams was born in Savannah, Georgia. In an interview conducted by the musicologist David Evans and his family, she stated that she and Willie met at a Christmas concert at her school in 1931. She went on to explain that Willie invited her to record with him, that they did so in Atlanta over the course of a week, and that she then returned to Augusta to continue her schooling at Paine College. According to Michael Gray, that week of recording would have been in February 1932. The McTells were married on January 11, 1934 in Aiken, South Carolina, both lying on their marriage certificate about their age which made them appear closer together in age. For the next six years she often accompanied Willie on stage, singing or dancing, in performances in Chicago, Atlanta and elsewhere, and in the company of artists such as Louis Armstrong and Bessie Smith. The two were invited to record for Decca Records by executive Mayo Williams in 1935, but the recordings from these sessions had extremely limited releases. Kate recalled dancing during their 1935 recording. In late June 1936, they recorded 12 blues songs with Piano Red for Vocalion Records.

In 1939, she obtained a nursing certificate from Grady Hospital in Atlanta, and from 1942 until 1971 she was an army nurse at Fort Gordon hospital, near Augusta. As Willie lived in Atlanta for his career, the two drifted apart but never divorced. Much of what is known about her husband comes from the interview she gave with the Evans family, published in Blues Unlimited magazine in 1977.

== After his death ==
She remarried to Johnny E. Seabrooks, who was in the military. They had two children, Ernest and April. She retired from the hospital in 1971. After Seabrooks died in 1976, she lived a fairly private life, except for interviews she gave in 1977, 1979, and 1981 about Willie McTell. She died in Augusta, Georgia, on October 3, 1991.

== As Ruby Glaze ==
There is some uncertainty as to whom Ruby Glaze was, a singer Willie McTell recorded with in February 1932 in Atlanta. Some speculation has pointed to Kate McTell but there remains significant doubt.

In a 1970s interview conducted by musicologist David Evans and his family, Kate McTell claimed that she had met Willie in December 1931 and recorded with him in Atlanta shortly afterward during a week-long session. She also claimed to be Ruby Glaze. Evans found this unlikely since they did not marry until 1934. Willie McTell biographer Michael Gray found major inconsistencies from Kate's stories in her interview with Evans among others, such as where she attended school and her age when they met. He got the impression when listening to her interviews as if she was angling to claim credit for being Ruby Glaze. He notes that her story was the one that was most widely known for many years.

In 1986, Bruce Bastin noted that there remained significant doubt but gave the year of their meeting as 1931, at her graduation from Paine College, in Augusta, Georgia, and stated that immediately afterward she went on to Washington High in Atlanta, which is where and when Willie recorded with Glaze. Bastin also found similarities between Glaze's spoken parts in "Searching the Desert for the Blues" and the ones in the McTells' recording of "Ticket Agent Blues" in 1935. Michael Gray strongly disagrees, arguing that the singing persona of Ruby Glaze is much more confident, professional and sexier than the shrill, unsure and amateurish voice of Kate McTell.

Those recordings with Ruby Glaze are among the rarest Blind Willie McTell recordings and were his last with Ralph Peer.

Michael Taft in passing said Glaze was ‘probably a pseudonym’ for Kate in his 2013 book but did not elaborate.

== Discography ==
Kate McTell appears on a small number of albums, generally accompanying her husband on vocals.

- April 1935 recordings for Decca
- Blind Willie McTell 1927–1949 (Willie McTell)
- Mississippi-Memphis-Chicago Blues (various artists)
- The Essential (Willie McTell)
- Gospel, Vol. 3: Guitar Evangelists and Bluesmen 1927–1944 (various artists)
- Le Gospel 1939–1952 (various artists), containing a solo track, "Dying Gambler"

== Other information ==
- She is referred to in a blues song, "Blind Willie", by Hans Theessink, in the lyric "Ruthy Kate leading Willie by the hand".
