= Means House (Jonesville, South Carolina) =

Historic house in South Carolina, United States

- U.S. National Register of Historic Places
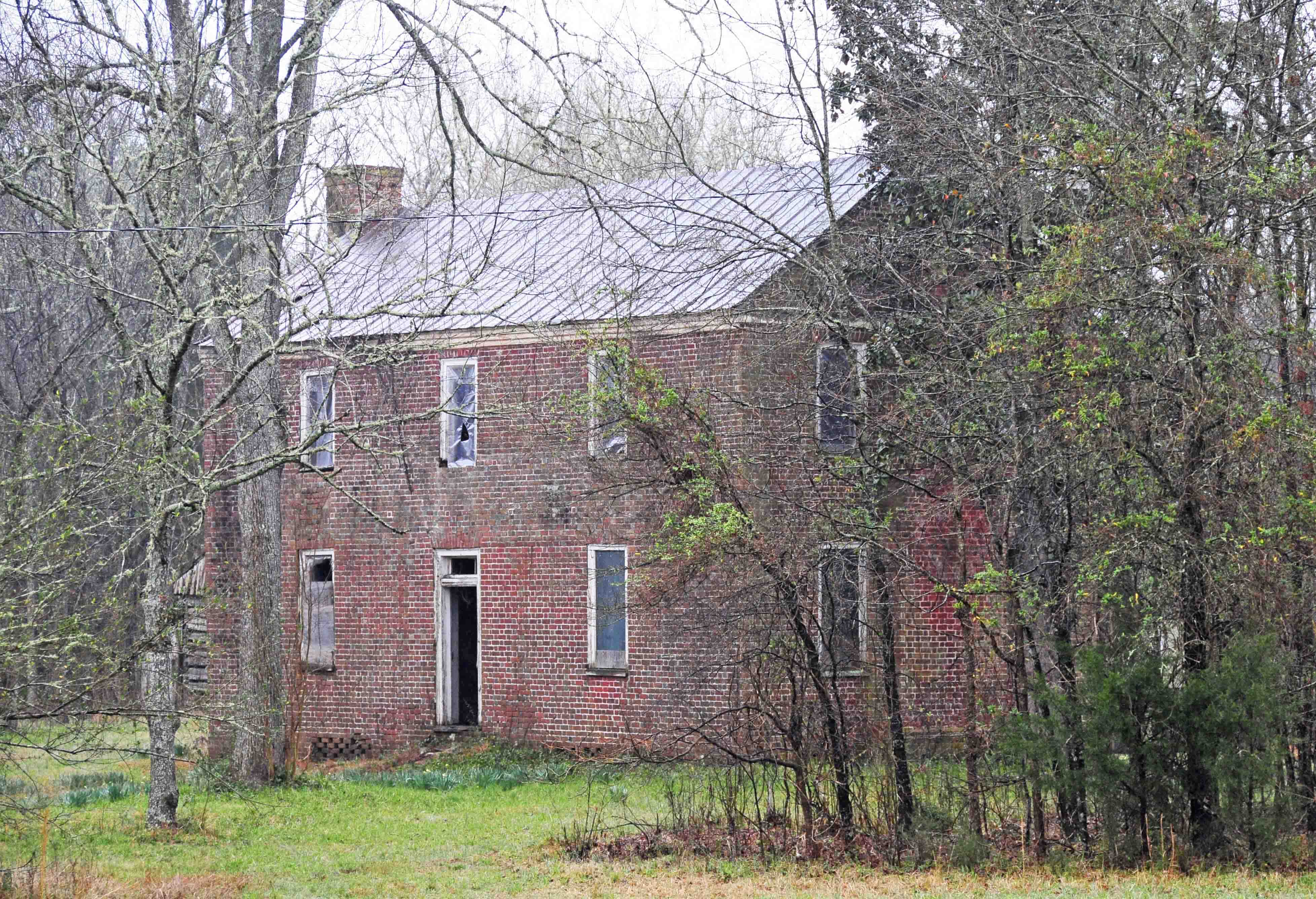

- Location within South Carolina Location within the United States
- Nearest city: Jonesville, South Carolina
- Coordinates: 34°48′34″N 81°42′55″W
- Area: 20 acres (8.1 ha)
- Architectural style: Georgian
- NRHP reference No.: 73001734
- Added to NRHP: April 13, 1973

The Means House near Jonesville, South Carolina was built in 1821. Situated on an isolated 20 acres in rural Union County SC, the 2650 square foot Means House has been listed on the National Register of Historic Places since 1973. The listing, in 1973, included two contributing buildings on 20 acres (8.1 ha).

Situated on an isolated 20 acres (8.1 ha) in Union County, South Carolina, the 2,650-square-foot (246 m^{2}) Means House is an unrestored federal treasure. Built in 1821 (205 years ago), the Means House is an example of Georgian architecture. The house features rare Flemish bond brick and Federal period woodwork. In 2008, the Palmetto Trust for Historic Places (a 501(c) 3 preservation organization) purchased the home in partnership with the Union County Historical Society. The house and property have been listed with the Palmetto Trust for Historic Places as being for sale for $86,798.

Although Means House is located in a rural area, downtown Spartanburg and the Interstate Highway 85 corridor are within 35 minutes from the doorstep. Greenville-Spartanburg International Airport is within 50 minutes. Other nearby historic sites include Rose Hill Plantation.
