= Wally Trice =

American baseball player (born 1966)

- Pitcher
- Born: July 28, 1966 (age 60); San Diego, California, U.S.
- Batted: Right Threw: Right

debut
- 1993, for the Mercuries Tigers

Last appearance
- 1993, for the Mercuries Tigers

Career statistics
- Win–loss record: 3–1
- Earned run average: 2.63
- Strikeouts: 21
- Stats at Baseball Reference

Teams
- Mercuries Tigers (1993)

Walter Maurice Trice (born July 28, 1966) played in affiliated minor league baseball from 1988 to 1993, for the Mercuries Tigers of the Chinese Professional Baseball League in 1993 and in independent baseball in 1996.

Prior to playing professionally, he attended Mar Vista High School and then U.S. International University.

Selected by the Houston Astros in the 15th round of the 1988 amateur draft, Trice began his professional career that year with the Auburn Astros. In 15 games (14 starts), he went 8-4 with six complete games and a 1.90 ERA, while striking out 107 batters and walking only 24 in 104 innings. He also allowed only 83 hits. He was second in the New York–Penn League in strikeouts, behind only Mike Sodders, who had 119.

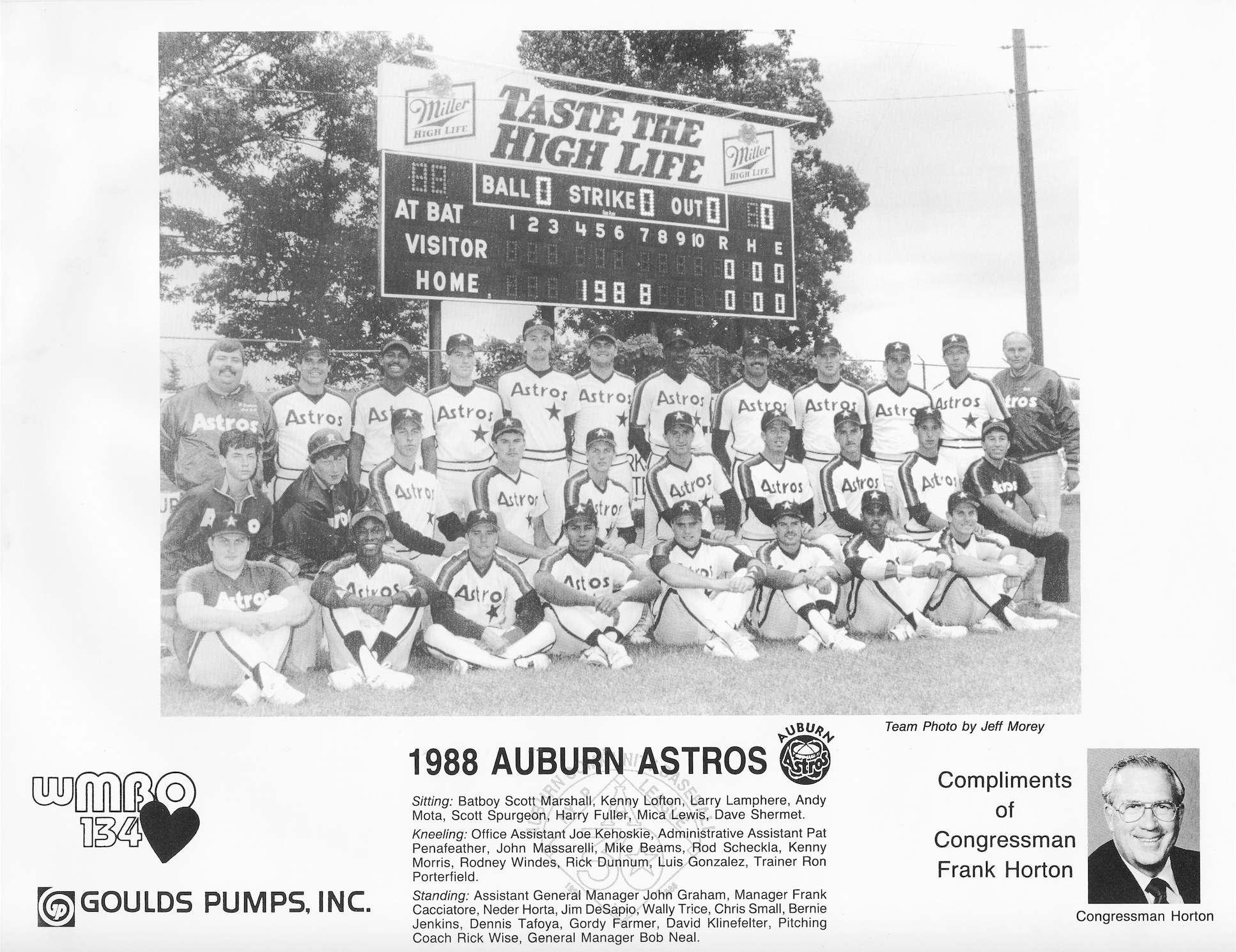
1988 Auburn Astros team photo

The following season, Trice went 16-4 with a 2.57 ERA in 28 games (27 starts) for the Osceola Astros. He led the Florida State League in victories, while his three shutouts tied for second in the loop. He also finished third in innings (182 1/3) and hits allowed (179). In 1990, with the Columbus Mudcats, Trice went 6-7 with a 4.02 ERA in 33 games (22 starts). His 17 home runs allowed were the second-most in the Southern League.

He became a relief pitcher in 1991, splitting the year between the Burlington Astros and Jackson Generals. In 55 appearances, he went 5-5 with a 2.08 ERA and 19 saves, while striking out 80 batters in 69 1/3 innings. He finished third in the Midwest League in saves with 18 (he had only one with the Generals of the Texas League).

After joining the Cleveland Indians system following the 1991 season, he returned to the starting rotation for part of 1992. In 33 games (14 starts), he went 5-7 with a 4.04 ERA for the Canton–Akron Indians. With Canton-Akron again in 1993, he went 3-2 with a 5.61 ERA in 19 games (three starts). He also pitched briefly with the Mercuries Tigers of the Chinese Professional Baseball League that year, going 3-1 with a 2.63 ERA.

He resurfaced with the Amarillo Dillas of the independent Texas–Louisiana League in 1996, going 1-3 with a 6.82 ERA in eight games (five starts).

Overall, Trice went 44-32 with a 3.38 ERA in 189 games (84 starts) in his American professional career.
