= Baby Tate (guitarist) =

American singer (1916–1972)

- Born: Charles Henry Tate; January 28, 1916; Elberton, Georgia, United States
- Died: August 17, 1972 (aged 56) Columbia, South Carolina, United States
- Genres: Piedmont blues, country blues
- Occupation: Guitarist
- Instruments: Guitar, vocals
- Years active: 1929–1972
- Labels: Kapp, Prestige, Trix

Charles Henry Tate, known as Baby Tate (January 28, 1916 – August 17, 1972) was an American Piedmont blues guitarist, who in a sporadic career spanning five decades worked with the guitarists Blind Boy Fuller and Pink Anderson and the harmonica player Peg Leg Sam. His playing style was influenced by Blind Blake, Buddy Moss, Blind Boy Fuller, Josh White, Willie Walker, and to some extent Lightnin' Hopkins.

== Biography ==
Tate was born in Elberton, Georgia, and was raised in Greenville, South Carolina. As an adolescent, he started performing locally, after seeing Blind Blake in Elberton. Tate later formed a trio with Joe Walker (the brother of Willie Walker) and Roosevelt "Baby" Brooks and, up to 1932, played locally. As the Carolina Blackbirds, they performed on radio station WFBC, broadcasting from the Jack Tar Hotel. For the rest of the 1930s he worked other jobs, mainly as a mason.

Tate served in the U.S. Army infantry during World War II in the south of England. He returned to the Spartanburg-Greenville club circuit in 1946. He claimed to have recorded several unreleased tracks for Kapp Records in 1950. Relocating to Spartanburg, South Carolina, he performed solo before forming an occasional duo with Pink Anderson, a working relationship that endured until the 1970s, when Anderson was disabled by a stroke.

Tate released his only album, Blues of Baby Tate: See What You Done Done, in 1962, and twelve months later appeared in Samuel Charters's documentary film The Blues. Throughout the 1960s he performed irregularly across the United States. With the harmonica player Peg Leg Sam or the guitarists Baby Brooks or McKinley Ellis, he recorded nearly sixty tracks in 1970 and 1971 for Peter B. Lowry, but the proposed album remained unreleased after Tate died unexpectedly in the summer of 1972. He appeared at a concert at the State University of New York at New Paltz, as a result of Lowry's efforts, in the spring of 1972.

Tate died of effects of a heart attack, in the Veterans Administration Hospital in Columbia, South Carolina, in August 1972, at the age of 56.

In January 2011, Tate was nominated for the 10th Annual Independent Music Awards in the category Blues Song, for "See What You Done Done". His recording of the song is included on the compilation album Classic Appalachian Blues, released by Smithsonian Folkways in 2010.

== Discography ==
=== Albums ===
- Blues of Baby Tate: See What You Done Done (1962, Prestige/Bluesville; 1995, CD reissue, Origin Blues Classics)

=== Singles ===
- "See What You Done Done" backed with "Late in the Evening", recorded 1970 (1974, Trix Records)

== See also ==
- List of country blues musicians
- List of Piedmont blues musicians
