= Lord, Send Me an Angel =

Song by Blind Willie McTell

from the album Atlanta Blues 1933
- Released: 1979
- Recorded: September 19, 1933; New York, New York
- Genre: Blues
- Length: 2:53
- Label: JEMF
- Songwriter: Blind Willie McTell

"Lord, Send Me an Angel"

Single by the White Stripes
- B-side: "You're Pretty Good Looking"
- Released: October 2000
- Recorded: 2000
- Genre: Blues
- Label: Sympathy for the Record Industry
- Songwriter: Blind Willie McTell

The White Stripes singles chronology
"Hello Operator" (2000)	"Lord, Send Me an Angel" (2000)	"Party of Special Things to Do" (2000)

"Ticket Agent Blues"

Single by Blind Willie McTell and Kate McTell
- A-side: "Bell Street Blues"
- Released: 1935
- Recorded: April 23, 1935; Chicago, Illinois
- Genre: Blues
- Label: Decca
- Songwriter: Blind Willie McTell

Blind Willie McTell singles chronology
"My Baby's Gone" (1933)	"Ticket Agent Blues" (1935)	"Dying Gambler" (1935)

"Lord, Send Me an Angel" is a song by Blind Willie McTell of which two versions were recorded on September 19, 1933, in New York City, with Curley Weaver on second guitar. Accompanied by his wife, Kate, McTell re-recorded it as "Ticket Agent Blues" in 1935, albeit with some alternate verses. This was used as the B-side to his single "Bell Street Blues" on Decca Records. The song was covered by Detroit, Michigan garage rock band, the White Stripes, which was released as a single in October 2000.

The original version of the song begins with a dialogue between the singer and God. The former asks for an angel and the latter says, having no angels, He'll send "a teasin' brown". The rest of the lyrics describe the singer's promiscuity and liking for women of different complexions: "One woman's Atlanta yellow, the other is Macon brown, but the Statesboro blackskin will turn your damper down". The song ends with the singer addressing a lover, saying he's leaving her and that she'll be sorry she drove him away, perhaps wishful thinking judging by the way he claims to regard women.

The alternate verses of "Ticket Agent Blues" lengthens the song, telling a story of the protagonist seeking his lover at a train station, describing her appearance to the ticket agent, and includes a warning to avoid relationships with married women, "cause their husband will grab ya, and beat ya ragged as a cedar tree". The song then ends in a similar fashion, the addressing a lover to tell her he's leaving her; however, this time the singer warns "I'ma tell you pretty mama exactly who I am, when I walk in that front door and hear that back door slam".

== The White Stripes single ==
The White Stripes' cover version features a few changes to the original lyrics: Frontman Jack White's name replaces McTell's, and Detroit replaces Macon and Georgia as place names.

Track listing

No.	Title	Length
1.	"Lord, Send Me an Angel" (Blind Willie McTell cover)
2.	"You're Pretty Good Looking" (Trendy American Remix)
