= Trix Records =

American independent record label

Trix Records was an American independent record label, which was set up in 1972, by the folklorist Peter B. Lowry.

It lasted just under a decade as an active label dealing mainly with Piedmont blues artists from the Southeastern states (the focus of Lowry's folkloric field research), together with the anthology Detroit After Hours, a collection of Detroit piano players. The label's last release was by David "Honeyboy" Edwards in 1978, although Lowry continued recording until 1980 with Cephas & Wiggins. Lowry's long-time partner, Roberta Casey, ran things in the 1990s and helped in arranging the sale of its eighteen issued LP master tapes to Joe Fields of Muse Records. The catalogue was later sold by Fields to 32 Records; more recently purchased by Savoy Jazz (JVC).

Its roster (released on LP) at the time included blues artists such as Eddie Kirkland, Peg Leg Sam, Frank Edwards, Henry Johnson, Willie Trice, Guitar Shorty, Robert Lockwood Jr., Pernell Charity, Tarheel Slim, Roy Dunn, Henry "Rufe" Johnson, Homesick James, Big Chief Ellis, David "Honeyboy" Edwards, Baby Tate, plus Detroit pianists Boogie Woogie Red, Chuck Smith, Emmett Lee Brooks, Carben Givens aka "Lamp", "Little Dickie" Rogers, Charlie Price, and James Barnes, plus "folk" artist Dan DelSanto and jazz artist Maurice Reedus.

David "Honeyboy" Edwards' 1978 Trix album, I've Been Around, recorded after a 25-year hiatus, was part of the body of work that won the then 95 year old artist a Grammy Award for Lifetime Achievement in 2010.

== See also ==
- List of record labels
