= Richard Trice =

American songwriter

- Also known as: Rich Trice, Little Boy Fuller
- Born: November 16, 1917; Chapel Hill, North Carolina, United States
- Died: April 6, 2000 (aged 82) Burnsville, North Carolina, United States
- Genres: Blues
- Occupations: Guitarist, singer, songwriter
- Instruments: Guitar, human voice
- Years active: 1930s–1960s
- Labels: Decca, Savoy

Richard Trice (November 16, 1917 – April 6, 2000) was an American blues guitarist, singer and songwriter. He released two singles. He lived most of his life in his native North Carolina and played in its regional blues style, often referred to as Piedmont blues, East Coast blues, or more generally country blues.

== Life and career ==
Trice was born in Chapel Hill, North Carolina. His family had moved to Raleigh by 1920.

Music was an interest in the family, and he learned to play the guitar at an early age. As an adolescent he partnered with his older brother, Willie Trice, playing at dances. In the 1930s, they formed a duo and began playing a ragtime-influenced blues, common in the Carolinas in that period. In Durham, North Carolina, they befriended Blind Boy Fuller in 1933. Fuller, at least ten years Richard's elder, greatly influenced him.

Through their relationship with Fuller, the brothers were recorded for Decca Records in New York in July 1937. Willie recorded two sides (issued as being by "Welly Trice") with Richard playing second guitar: "Come On in Here Mama" and "Let Her Go God Bless Her". (At the same session, Richard—billed as Rich Trice recorded his own compositions "Come On Baby" and "Trembling Bed Springs Blues"; these were not issued for a while.)

Trice moved to Newark, New Jersey, in the 1940s. In October 1946, billed as Little Boy Fuller, he recorded two sides for Savoy Records, "Shake Your Stuff" and "Lazy Bug Blues". He recorded several other tracks over the next six years, none of which were released.

In the 1950s, Trice moved back to North Carolina and joined a gospel quartet. He performed at house parties, juke joints, and tobacco warehouses until the early 1960s. He was interviewed by music historians in the 1970s, but he never played blues guitar again.

The film Shine On: Richard Trice and the Bull City Blues, released in 2000, chronicled Trice's life, the blues music particular to his region, and his spiritual rediscovery. It contained music by Trice, Blind Boy Fuller, Reverend Gary Davis, John Dee Holeman and Willie Trice. The film received an honorable mention at the Columbus International Film & Video Festival in 2000.

Trice died in April 2000, in Burnsville, North Carolina, at the age of 82. He was interred at Mount Sinai Baptist Church Cemetery, in Chapel Hill, North Carolina, alongside Willie, who had died in 1976.
