= David Fulmer =

American writer

- Born: Thurston David Fulmer; April 3, 1950 (age 76); Northumberland, Pennsylvania, U.S.
- Occupations: Writer; journalist; producer
- Spouses: Suzanne Mercier (m. 1974; div. 1979) Sansanee Sermprungsuk (m. 2013)
- Children: 1
- Writing career
- Years active: 1990-present
- Subjects: Historical fiction, Crime fiction, Mystery
- Notable work: The Valentin St. Cyr Storyville series

David Fulmer (born April 3, 1950) is an American author and former journalist who also made one film.

== Career ==
Fulmer wrote and produced the documentary Blind Willie's Blues (1996), which Video Librarian called "nothing less than the economic, social, and historical evolution of America's indigenous music". It was re-released on YouTube in December 2023.

== Works ==
=== St. Cyr series ===
In 2001, Fulmer's first novel, Chasing the Devil's Tail, was released by Poisoned Pen Press. Harcourt Books purchased the paperback rights in 2003, and then contracted with Fulmer for five more novels. Publishers Weekly predicted the book would generate a lot of buzz and sales.

Rampart Street won the Benjamin Franklin Award in 2007 for best audiobook fiction. San Francisco Chronicle found Rampart Street could be "savored as a stand-alone volume; readers need not have read 'Chasing the Devil's Tail' or its follow- up, 'Jass,' to appreciate it."

Lost River was reviewed by Kirkus Reviews, Booklist, and the Atlanta Journal-Constitution.

=== Other novels ===
His novel The Blue Door was reviewed by Library Journal and The Washington Post.

=== Short fiction ===
- "Back o' Town Blues", Flesh and Blood, 2003
- "Algiers", New Orleans Noir, Akashic Books, April 2007

== Awards ==
Chasing the Devil's Tail

- Winner, AudioFile Earphones Award
- Nominee, 2004 Falcon Award
- Nominee Best Novel - Los Angeles Times Book Prize
- Winner, Shamus Award for Best First Novel
- Nominee, Barry Award for Best Mystery
- "Best New Series", Booklist
- "Hottest Beach Read" - Books Read Lately

Jass

- 2006 Georgia Author of the Year Award for Fiction
- "Best of 2005 List" – Library Journal
- "Best of 2005 List" – The St. Louis Post-Dispatch
- "Best of 2005 List" – Deadly Pleasures Magazine

Rampart Street

- 2007 Benjamin Franklin Award for Adult Fiction Audiobook
- New York magazine "Best Novel You've Never Read"

The Dying Crapshooter's Blues

- "Ice Pick of the Month" – Booklist, January 2007

The Blue Door

- "2008 Best of the Shelf" – Atlanta magazine
- Nomination for "2009 Shamus Award for Best Novel"
- "Anthracite" (Pilot screenplay) Semi-Finalist - 2025 Filmmatic Script Competition
