= Medicine show =

Touring act

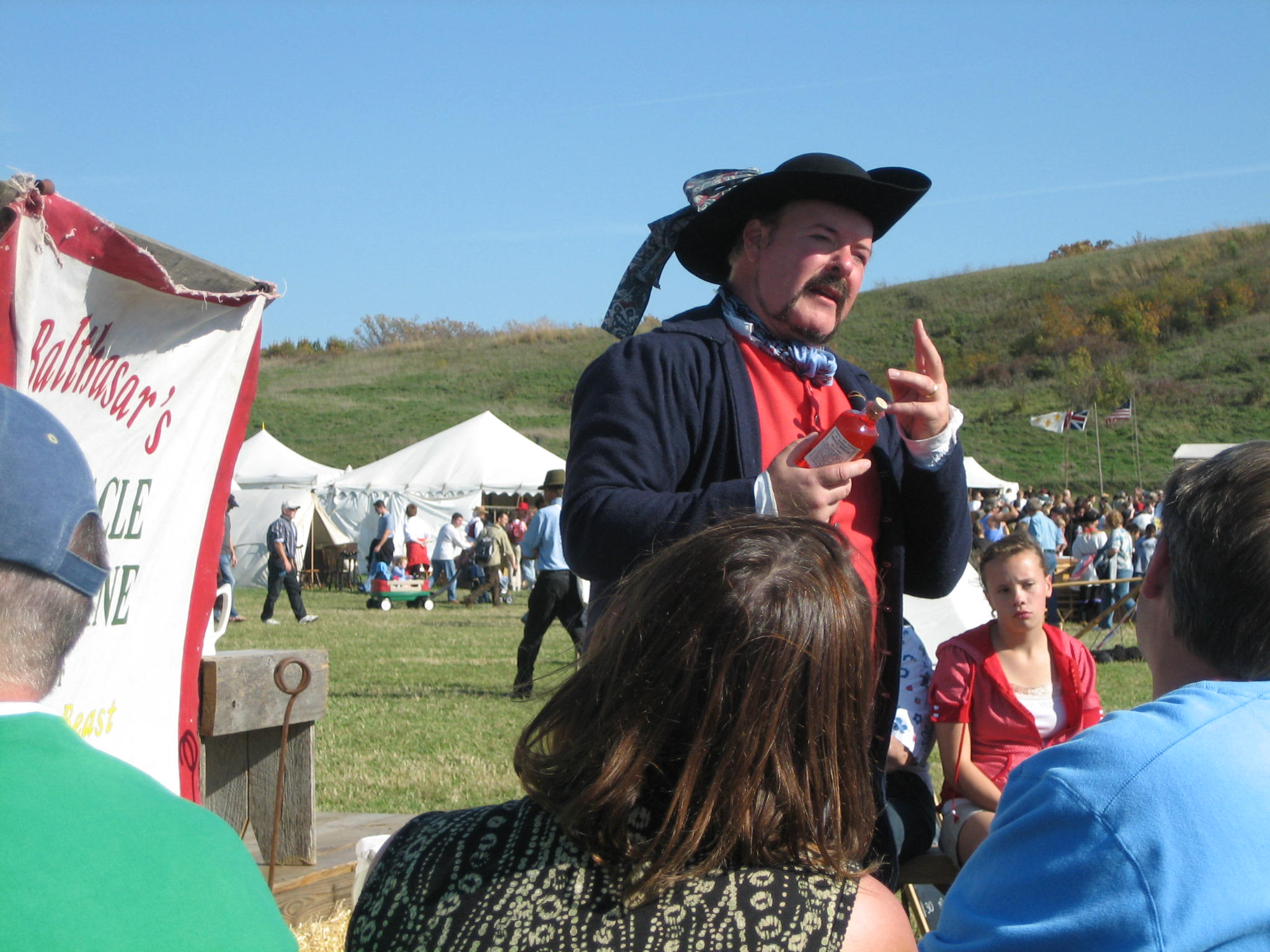
A reenactment of a medicine show in Ringwood, Illinois

Medicine shows were touring acts (traveling by truck, horse, or wagon teams) that peddled "miracle cure" patent medicines and other products between various entertainments. They developed from European mountebank shows and were common in the United States in the nineteenth century, especially in the Old West (though some continued until World War II).

Medicine shows usually promoted "miracle elixirs", sometimes referred to as "snake oil liniment", which made various claims such as being able to cure disease, smooth wrinkles, remove stains, prolong life or cure any number of common ailments. Most shows had their own "patent medicine" (products which were for the most part unpatented, but which took the name to sound official).

Entertainments often included a freak show, a flea circus, musical acts, magic tricks, jokes, or storytelling. Each show was run by a man posing as a doctor who drew the crowd with a monologue. The entertainers, such as acrobats, musclemen, magicians, dancers, ventriloquists, exotic performers, and trick shots, kept the audience engaged until the salesman sold his medicine.

== History ==
=== Origins ===
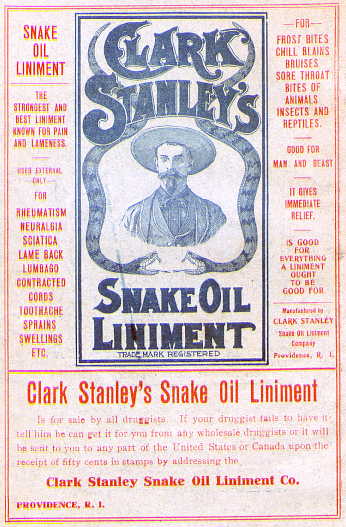
Advertisement for Clark Stanley's Snake Oil Liniment

While showmen pitching miraculous cures have been around since classical times, the advent of mixed performance and medicine sales in western culture originated during the Dark Ages in Europe after circuses and theatres were banned and performers had only the marketplace or patrons for support. Mountebanks traveled through small towns and large cities, selling miraculous elixirs by offering small street shows and miraculous cures. Itinerant peddlers of dubious medicines appeared in the American colonies before 1772, when legislation prohibiting their activities was enacted. Increasingly elaborate performances were developed to appeal to a largely rural population.

=== Nineteenth century ===
Over the course of the nineteenth century, traveling mountebanks gave way to more polished medicine shows, which availed themselves of a burgeoning patent medicine industry. At least 1,500 patent medicines were recorded by 1858, affording enterprising drifters a specific product to sell. These "medicines" seldom treated the specific symptoms of an illness, instead relying on stimulants or other drugs to produce a pleasurable effect. Alcohol, opium and cocaine were typical ingredients, and their addictive qualities provided an additional incentive for consumers to continue buying them, while their supposed medicinal benefit afforded a sufficient excuse. By 1900, the patent medicine industry was an $80 million business. Also contributing to the rise of the medicine show was the expansion of the advertising industry, through which shows were able to procure inexpensive posters, fliers, handbills, and other merchandising to promote their products. Other forms of advertising included the use of memorable jingles, sensational testimonials, and scare tactics.

Medicine shows combined various forms of popular entertainment with sales pitches from a self-proclaimed "doctor" who sold an astounding cure-all medicine or device. Shows played either outdoors from a wagon, platform or tent, or indoors in a theatre or opera hall. Admission was usually free or nominal. Pitchmen would make grandiose claims about their product's efficacy, sometimes planting testimonials in the audience. The speaker's goal was to create a need, or fear, then offer his unique medicine as the only cure. Alternating entertainment with sales pitches wore down the audience's resistance, until the crowd was saturated with a desire for the product. The show would continue to run as many days as possible, then move on to the next town. A show might remain in a given location between one night and six weeks, depending on how the troupe behaved itself.

Medicine shows often brought entertainment to rural communities that might not have any other sort of performances for years at a time. Whatever the quality of the medical advice, some spectators enjoyed the free entertainment. Some shows followed circuits covering the entire United States, though most shows focused on the rural midwest and south, where the inhabitants were considered particularly gullible.

== Hamlin's Wizard Oil Company and Kickapoo Indian Medicine Company ==
The two largest and most successful American medicine shows were Hamlin's Wizard Oil Company, founded in Chicago by John and Lysander Hamlin, and the Kickapoo Indian Medicine Company, founded in 1881 by Charles Bigelow and John Healey. Hamlin's Wizard Oil Company troupes travelled in specially designed wagons, with built-in organs and space for musical performers. Their appeal was clean, moral, musical entertainment for the whole family. Part of their advertising included songsters, or small booklets of song lyrics and Wizard Oil advertising. The Kickapoo Indian Medicine Company created traveling shows based around sham Indian presentational ceremonies, such as war dances and marriages. "Representatives" of the Kickapoo tribe translated for the Indians and sold Sagwa, the most famous patent medicine. The company also presented other forms of entertainment, such as vaudeville shows, trained dog acts, dances, and acrobatics.

== 20th century ==
As reliable commercial pharmaceuticals were produced on an industrial level in the early 20th century, the reputation of and market for home remedies began to dwindle, and medicine shows came to rely ever more on their entertainment value. But as America's population became less rural and more urbanized, the availability of other forms of entertainment, such as motion pictures, vaudeville and later radio, led to the gradual disappearance of the traveling medicine show. By the 1930s few such companies continued to tour in the United States. Even fewer shows endured the economic and social upheaval of the Great Depression and World War II. Those that survived into the 1950s found themselves competing with television and came to be regarded as relics of an earlier, more innocent era. This novelty, far more than the availability of the remedies peddled, provided the chief support for the last of the traveling medicine shows.

=== The Hadacol Caravan ===
One of the most famous of the 20th-century traveling shows was the Hadacol Caravan, sponsored by Louisiana State Senator Dudley J. LeBlanc and his LeBlanc Corporation, makers of the dubious patent medicine/vitamin tonic Hadacol, known for both its alleged curative powers and its high alcohol content. The stage show, which ran throughout the Deep South in the 1940s with great publicity, featured a number of notable music acts and Hollywood celebrities and promoted Hadacol, which was sold during intermission and after the show. Admission to the show was paid in boxtops of the vitamin tonic, sold in stores throughout the southern United States. The Caravan came to a sudden halt in 1951, when the Hadacol enterprise fell apart in a financial scandal.

=== Chief Thundercloud and Peg Leg Sam ===
One of the last great medicine shows had its swan song in the summer of 1972, when the two-man show of Chief Thundercloud (pitchman Leo Kahdot, a Potawatomi from Oklahoma) and Peg Leg Sam (harmonicist-singer-comedian Arthur Jackson) played at a carnival in Pittsboro, North Carolina. It was the last show of the year for them; Kahdot died that winter. Born For Hard Luck, a documentary film about Peg Leg Sam, includes scenes from that last show.

=== "Doc" Scott’s Last Real Old Time Medicine Show ===
Perhaps the last of the medicine shows was run by Tommy Scott, who staged as many as three hundred shows per year until about 1990. As a teenager in the 1930s, Scott joined the "Doc" Chambers Medicine Show, established by M. F. Chambers in the late nineteenth century. Scott sang, played guitar, performed ventriloquism and blackface acts, and pitched Chambers's Herb-O-Lac herbal laxative. When Chambers retired in the late 1930s, Scott took charge of the show, performing for many years with his wife, Mary, and his sidekick, Gaines Blevins, known as "Old Bleb". Scott's daughter, Sandra, performed in the show as a singer, bass player, and acrobat, and from the 1960s onward managed the business end of the show. Herb-O-Lac eventually gave way to a mentholated skin liniment, which Scott dubbed Snake Oil. For decades, the show toured arenas and senior centers as "Doc" Scott's Last Real Old Time Medicine Show. From the 1960s to the 1980s, the show also solicited donations for charitable organizations such as the Lions Club and the Optimist Club.

== See also ==
- Patent medicine
- Quackery

== Bibliography ==
- Agnew, Jeremy. Entertainment in the Old West: Theater, Music, Circuses, Medicine Shows, Prizefighting and Other Popular Amusements. Jefferson, N.C: McFarland & Company, Inc., Publishers, 2011. Print.
- Anderson, Ann. Snake Oil, Hustlers and Hambones: The American Medicine Show. Jefferson: McFarland & Company, 2000. Print.
- Hartman, Donald K. Edward Oliver Tilburn (aka N. T. Oliver, Ned Oliver, Nevada Ned, and Edward Tilburne): The Profile of a Con-Artist. Buffalo, N.Y.: Themes & Settings in Fiction Press, 2022.. Nevada Ned was a prominent showman for the Kickapoo Indian Medicine Company.
- McNamara, Brooks. Step Right up. 1st ed. Garden City, N.Y: Doubleday, 1976. Print.
