= Jonesville, South Carolina =

- Town
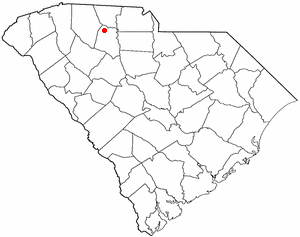
- Location of Jonesville, South Carolina
- Coordinates: 34°50′05″N 81°40′52″W
- Country: United States
- State: South Carolina
- County: Union

Area
  - Total: 1.02 sq mi (2.65 km^{2})
  - Land: 1.02 sq mi (2.63 km^{2})
  - Water: 0.0077 sq mi (0.02 km^{2})
- Elevation: 682 ft (208 m)

Population (2020)
  - Total: 852
  - Density: 839.7/sq mi (324.21/km^{2})
- Time zone: UTC-5 (Eastern (EST))
  - Summer (DST): UTC-4 (EDT)
- ZIP codes: 29353, 29395
- Area codes: 864, 821
- FIPS code: 45-37330
- GNIS feature ID: 2405921
- Website: townofjonesvillesc.org

Jonesville is a town in Union County, South Carolina, United States. The population was 911 at the 2010 United States census.

== History ==
A Confederate monument in the town, pictured c. 1911

The McWhirter House and Means House are listed on the National Register of Historic Places.

== Geography ==
According to the United States Census Bureau, the town has a total area of 1.0 square mile (2.6 km^{2}), of which, 1.0 square mile (2.6 km^{2}) of it is land and 0.97% is water.

== Demographics ==
Historical population
Census	Pop.	Note	%±
1880	266		—
1890	286		7.5%
1900	508		77.6%
1910	969		90.7%
1920	1,209		24.8%
1930	1,153		−4.6%
1940	1,182		2.5%
1950	1,345		13.8%
1960	1,439		7.0%
1970	1,447		0.6%
1980	1,201		−17.0%
1990	1,205		0.3%
2000	982		−18.5%
2010	911		−7.2%
2020	852		−6.5%
U.S. Decennial Census

As of the census of 2000, there were 982 people, 444 households, and 264 families residing in the town. The population density was 965.6 inhabitants per square mile (372.8/km^{2}). There were 497 housing units at an average density of 488.7 per square mile (188.7/km^{2}). The racial makeup of the town was 65.07% White, 32.79% African American, 0.10% Native American, 0.20% Pacific Islander, 1.02% from other races, and 0.81% from two or more races. Hispanic or Latino of any race were 1.53% of the population.

There were 444 households, out of which 25.2% had children under the age of 18 living with them, 35.8% were married couples living together, 18.5% had a female householder with no husband present, and 40.5% were non-families. 36.7% of all households were made up of individuals, and 20.7% had someone living alone who was 65 years of age or older. The average household size was 2.21 and the average family size was 2.88.

In the town, the population was spread out, with 22.6% under the age of 18, 6.8% from 18 to 24, 26.5% from 25 to 44, 23.8% from 45 to 64, and 20.3% who were 65 years of age or older. The median age was 40 years. For every 100 females, there were 92.2 males. For every 100 females age 18 and over, there were 85.8 males.

The median income for a household in the town was $22,273, and the median income for a family was $31,458. Males had a median income of $24,583 versus $19,643 for females. The per capita income for the town was $13,116. About 9.5% of families and 12.5% of the population were below the poverty line, including 15.9% of those under age 18 and 14.9% of those age 65 or over.
