= Peter B. Lowry =

American folklorist (1941–2022)

Peter B. Lowry (April 1, 1941 – June 29, 2022) was an American folklorist, writer, record producer, ethnomusicologist, historian, photographer, forensic musicologist, and teacher who dealt with aspects of popular music, mainly African-American.

Born in Montclair, New Jersey, he attended Deerfield Academy, and then Princeton University, where he specialized in the biological sciences. Teaching biology for a few years after obtaining a Master's in zoology, he changed his focus to blues and jazz with a primary focus on the Piedmont blues of the south-eastern United States. He wrote extensively on blues and jazz music, founded Trix Records, and moved to live in Australia in later life.

== Ethnomusicological and folkloric field research ==
Lowry traveled through the South Eastern United States for over a decade in the 1970s and 80's doing field recording and other research in the Piedmont region of Virginia, Georgia, and the Carolinas, including interviewing, photographing, and recording blues and gospel musicians between 1970 and 1980, initially working in collaboration with British folklorist Bruce Bastin. His field research also took him occasionally to the Midwestern US, where he recorded local Michigan pianists for the album Detroit After Hours – Vol. 1 and on to Chicago to record the blues albums Goin' Back Home (Homesick James) and I've Been Around (David "Honeyboy" Edwards).

== Trix Records ==
In the early 1970s Lowry founded Trix Records, which proceeded to issue six 45s, and then 17 full-length LPs, from his hundreds of hours of field recordings. Trix artists included the stepson of Blues legend Robert Johnson, Robert Jr. Lockwood; Detroit and Macon, GA's Eddie Kirkland; Chicago's David "Honeyboy" Edwards; and New York-based Tarheel Slim. The then 92-year-old Edwards was the oldest musician to perform in Washington at the official celebration of the first inauguration of his country's first African American president, Edwards' neighbor, Barack Obama and received a Grammy Lifetime Achievement Award in 2010. Trix Records remained active for two decades before the issued LP masters and company name were sold to Joe Fields of Muse Records, in New York. It was subsequently sold on to Joel Dorn and 32 Jazz/Blues, also in NYC, before ending with JVC's Savoy Jazz imprint. Lowry also produced albums for Atlantic Records (at the urging of Atlantic's founder Ahmet Ertegun), Muse Records, Savoy Records, Columbia Records, Biograph Records, Flyright Records, and other companies. He began writing about blues music for Blues Unlimited in the UK in 1964 when, at the Apollo Theatre in NYC, he became the first mainstream American journalist to interview and write about the young B.B. King in 1964.

== Alan Lomax and Library of Congress ==
After his decade of active fieldwork, Lowry worked with renowned ethnomusicologist Alan Lomax over two years at the Folklife Archives of the US Library of Congress on a project that later became "The Deep River of Song" series of CDs, a comprehensive collection of African American musics that was later commercially issued by Rounder Records in their "Alan Lomax Collection". The complete collection of Lowry's own field recorded material is copied and held in the permanent collection of the Library of Congress American Folklife Center Archive of Folk Culture. Later, his tapes were deposited with the Southern Folklife Collection in the Wilson Library of the University of North Carolina at Chapel Hill, so that it would be possible for interested members of the public to listen to any of them at either location for research purposes.

== Writings on music ==
Lowry wrote about African American music from 1964, beginning with Blues Unlimited in the UK. He later wrote for Blues & Rhythm (UK), Cadence (US), Jazz Digest/HIP (US), Jazz Times (US), Juke Blues (UK), Living Blues (US), Penguin Eggs (CN), Rhythms (in Melbourne, Australia), Rolling Stone, The International Association of Jazz Record Collectors Journal (US), and Western Folklore (US), among others.

His series of articles in Blues & Rhythm magazine was called "The Stuff Was Still There – More Traveling & Recording The Blues". Along with an earlier series ("Oddenda & Such"), it tells the stories of his record label, Trix Records, the artists he located (and interviewed), recorded, and promoted along with the trials and tribulations of doing field research in the South East in the 1970s, plus the folly of owning and supporting a specialist blues music record label.

== Education and other endeavors ==
A graduate of Princeton University, Lowry held an MS from Rutgers University in Zoology and Serology, studied medicine at Columbia University Vagelos College of Physicians and Surgeons at Columbia University and Université Libre de Bruxelles and was a university lecturer in the biological sciences at SUNY New Paltz. Lowry later enrolled at The University of Pennsylvania in the PhD program in the Folklore Department, acquiring a master's degree and completing his doctoral studies. He taught at a number of schools and universities as a visiting scholar and later worked on a book on Piedmont Blues, entitled Truckin' My Blues Away: Piedmont Blues in Context, among other projects. These include more writings, as well as finally gathering his field recordings into possible album concepts; they number approximately fifty single-artist collections, with an additional twenty anthologies or "live" recordings. His first "field recordings" took place in 1966 at the Apollo Theatre in Harlem, of a show of blues.

Lowry moved permanently to Australia in 1995, receiving Permanent Residency there as a scholar in the arts in 2000 for his unique expertise regarding American black musics.

== Death ==
Lowry died in Sydney, Australia, on June 29, 2022.

== Select publications ==
- Lowry, Peter B. (2010) "Blues in the Southeast USA – More Travellin' & Recording The Blues" ("The Stuff Was Still There" series) Blues & Rhythm, April, May, June, July, & September 2010 – continuing
- Lowry, Peter B. (2010) Review of Jazz by Gary Giddins & Scott DeVeaux, in: The IAJRC Journal, Vol. 43, #3, September 2010, pp. 30–32.
- Lowry, Peter B., (2009) Review of Edward Komara, ed., The Routledge Encyclopedia of the Blues, in: Western Folklore Vol. 68, No. 2/3 — Spring 2009; p. 321.
- Lowry, Peter B. (2009) "DIY Fieldwork: George Mitchell's Southern Trawlings" in Rhythms (Melbourne) #203/June, pp. 26–27.
- Lowry, Peter B. (2006) Review of Louis Armstrong & Paul Whiteman. Two Kings of Jazz, by Joshua Berrett, in: IAJRC Journal, 39/3, pp. 89–90
- Welker, Gaile & Lowry, Peter B. (2006) entry "Piedmont Blues" in The Routledge Encyclopedia of the Blues, ed. Edward Komara (New York: Routledge). ISBN 0-415-92699-8.
- Lowry, Peter B. (2005) review of Alan Lomax: Selected Writings, 1934–1997: in Western Folklore – Winter, p. 368.
- Lowry, Peter B. (2002) “Alan Lomax: Twentieth Century Icon” – Rhythms (Melbourne) #122, pp. 36–38.
- Lowry, Peter B. (1977) "Atlanta Black Sound: A Survey of Black music from Atlanta During the 20th Century" in The Atlanta Historical Bulletin, Vol. II, No. 2, pp. 88–113.
- Lowry, Peter B. as "Pete Lowry" – extensive articles for Blues Unlimited (Sussex, UK), 1964–1975.
- Ford, Robert. name entry in A Blues Bibliography (Bromley, Kent: Paul Pelletier Publishing, 1999; 2nd edition, New York: Routledge, 2007).
- Komara, Edward. name entry in The Routledge Encyclopedia of the Blues (New York: Routledge). ISBN 0-415-92699-8.
