= Bruce Bastin =

British folklorist

Bruce Bastin (born 19 September 1939) is an English folklorist and a leading expert on the blues music styles of the southeastern states of America (such as East Coast blues and Piedmont blues). In 2022, his publication Red River Blues: The Blues Tradition in the Southeast was inducted into the Blues Hall of Fame, as a 'Classic of Blues Literature'.

He is responsible for research (done initially with folklorist Peter B. Lowry) over the decades.

== Early life and career ==
Bastin was born in Chelmsford, Essex, England. A former secondary school geography teacher, he holds a master's degree in folklore from the University of North Carolina at Chapel Hill and is the author of two books on the Piedmont blues, Crying for the Carolines and Red River Blues: The Blues Tradition in the Southeast, as well as a biography of music publisher Joe Davis, Never Sell a Copyright. He has written articles for music journals and books over the decades, plus liner note essays on the Southeastern blues style.

Bruce Bastin is also the managing director of Interstate Music, Ltd., West Sussex, England, with its labels:

- Country Routes
- Flyright
- Harlequin
- Heritage
- Krazy Kat
- Magpie
- Travelin' Man

He has produced and/or programmed albums for them in many musical genres, generally re-issue in nature.

== Publications ==
- Bastin, Bruce (1971) Crying for the Carolines (London: Studio Vista). ISBN 978-0-289-70209-3.
- Bastin, Bruce (1986/1995) Red River Blues: The Blues Tradition in the Southeast (Urbana and Chicago: University of Illinois Press). ISBN 978-0-252-06521-7
- Bastin, Bruce "Blind Boy Fuller" in Grossman, Stefan & Fuller, Blind Boy Stefan Grossman's early masters of American blues guitar: Blind Boy Fuller, Alfred Music Publishing, 1993, ISBN 978-0-7390-4331-8
- Bastin, Bruce "Truckin' My Blues Away – East Coast Piedmont Styles" in Lawrence Cohn, ed. (1993). Nothing But the Blues: The Music and the Musicians. Abbeville Publishing Group (Abbeville Press, Inc.), pp. 205–231. ISBN 1-55859-271-7.
