= Robert Francis Withers Allston =

American politician

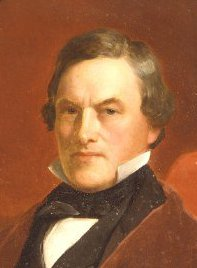
- detail of portrait by George Whiting Flagg, c. 1850

67th Governor of South Carolina
- In office December 10, 1856 – December 10, 1858
- Lieutenant: Gabriel Cannon
- Preceded by: James Hopkins Adams
- Succeeded by: William Henry Gist

President of the South Carolina Senate
- In office November 25, 1850 – December 10, 1856; Pro tempore: December 14, 1847 – November 25, 1850
- Governor: David Johnson; Whitemarsh B. Seabrook; John Hugh Means; John Lawrence Manning; James Hopkins Adams
- Preceded by: Angus Patterson
- Succeeded by: James Chesnut, Jr.

Member of the South Carolina Senate from Georgetown District
- In office December 12, 1834 – December 10, 1856
- Preceded by: Himself
- Succeeded by: John I. Middleton
- In office November 25, 1833 – November 24, 1834
- Preceded by: John Harleston Read
- Succeeded by: Himself

Member of the South Carolina House of Representatives from Georgetown District
- In office November 21, 1828 – November 26, 1832

Personal details
- Born: April 21, 1801 Waccamaw River, South Carolina, US
- Died: April 7, 1864 (aged 62) Georgetown County, South Carolina, US
- Party: Democratic
- Spouse: Adele Petigru
- Children: 9, including Elizabeth Waties Allston Pringle
- Education: United States Military Academy
- Profession: Statesman

Military service
- Branch/service: United States Army
- Years of service: 1821–1822
- Rank: Second lieutenant

Robert Francis Withers Allston (April 21, 1801 – April 7, 1864) was the 67th governor of South Carolina. He was born in the Waccamaw River in South Carolina.

He graduated from the United States Military Academy at West Point in 1821, and briefly served as second lieutenant of artillery before resigning in February 1822.

== Career ==
He was elected to the South Carolina House of Representatives in 1828, serving in that body through 1831. In 1834, he was elected to the South Carolina Senate, serving in that body until 1856, while there he was appointed Senate President in 1847 and was involved in several disputed elections involving the Prince George Winyah S.C. Senate seat, in large part because of his staunch support of nullification. From 1856 to 1858 he served as Governor of South Carolina. Following South Carolina's secession, he was a Confederate presidential elector.

== Family and background ==
His family was able to maintain two houses in Georgetown and several plantations, including the Allston ancestral home on the Pee Dee River, Chicora Wood—one of the five plantations Robert Allston owned, with over 9,500 acres and at least 690 enslaved Blacks, making him the eighth largest enslaver in United States history. On his farms he primarily grew rice and published several works on rice planting, including the well-regarded Memoir of the Introduction and Planting of Rice in South-Carolina (1843) and Essay on Sea Coast Crops (1854). Allston's daughter, Elizabeth Waties Allston Pringle, took over the management of Chicora Wood after his death.

Born in 1801 as a younger son to a Georgetown rice plantation who died when Robert was a child. In 1832, he married Adeline (Adéle) Theresa Petigru (b. 1811 d. 1896.) She was the younger sister of James Louis Petigru, a well-known Charleston SC lawyer. They moved to Chicora Woods and had the following children:

1. Benjamin b.1833 d.1900 2. Robert b. 1834 d.1839 3. Charlotte Frances b. 1837 d. 1843 4. Adele Petigru Vanderhorst b. 1840 d.1915 5. Louise Gibert b. 1842 d. 1843 6. Elizabeth Waties Pringle b. 1845 d.1876 7. Charles Petigru b. 1848 d.1922 8. Jane Louise Hill b. 1850 d. 1937 9. Unnamed infant son b. 1852

== See also ==
- Nathaniel Russell House

Political offices
Preceded by James Hopkins Adams	Governor of South Carolina; 1856–1858	Succeeded by William Henry Gist
