= Nathaniel Russell House =

Historic house in South Carolina, United States

- U.S. National Register of Historic Places
- U.S. National Historic Landmark
- U.S. National Historic Landmark District – Contributing property
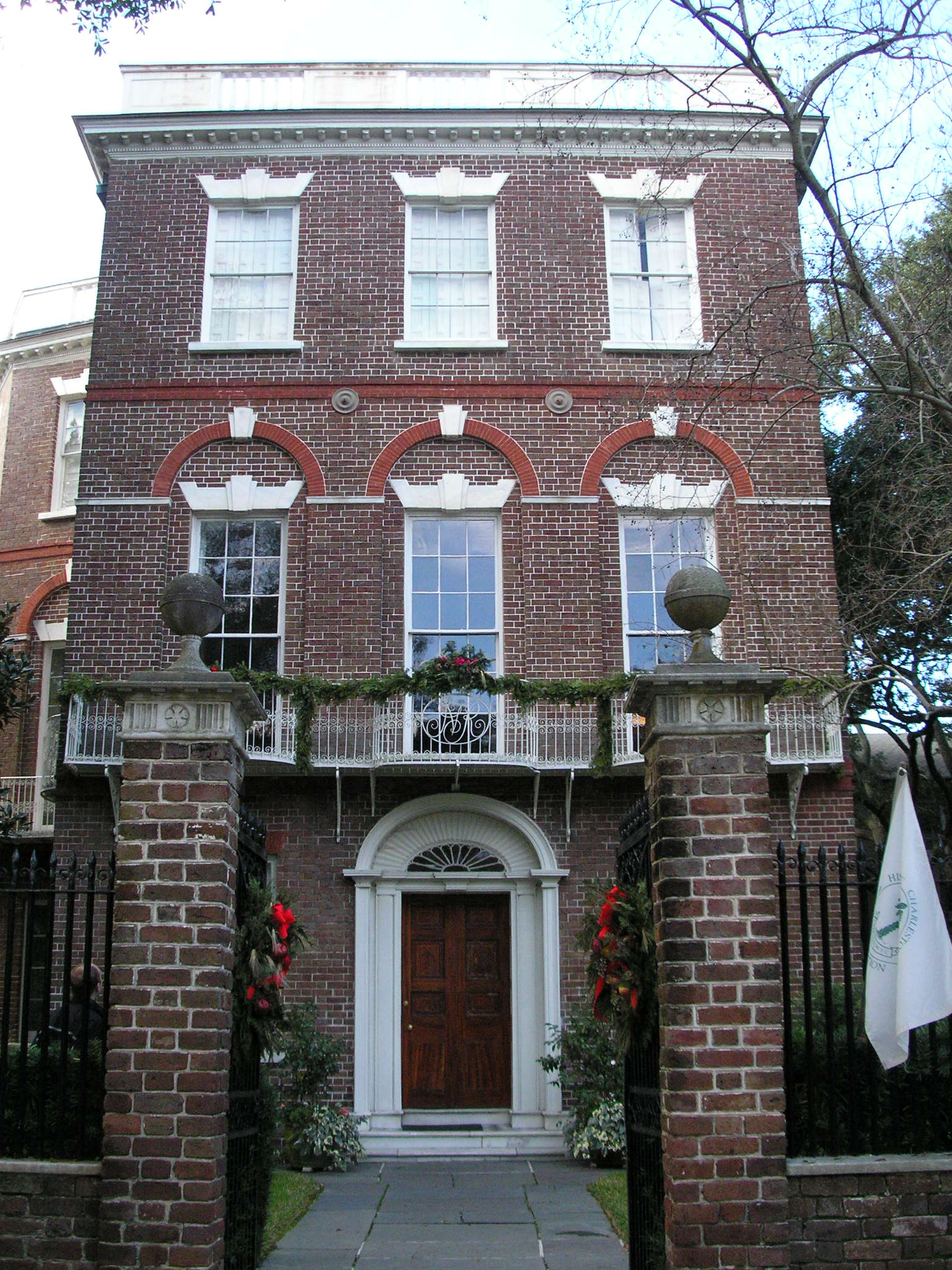
- Location: 51 Meeting Street, Charleston, South Carolina, United States
- Coordinates: 32°46′26″N 79°55′53″W
- Built: 1803–1808
- Architectural style: Federal-style
- Part of: Charleston Historic District (ID66000964)
- NRHP reference No.: 71000750

Significant dates
- Added to NRHP: August 19, 1971
- Designated NRHP: November 7, 1973
- Designated NHL: October 9, 1960

The Nathaniel Russell House is an architecturally distinguished, early 19th-century house at 51 Meeting Street in Charleston, South Carolina, United States. Built in 1808 by wealthy merchant and slave trader Nathaniel Russell, it is recognized as one of the United States' most important neoclassical houses. It was designated a National Historic Landmark in 1973.

== History ==
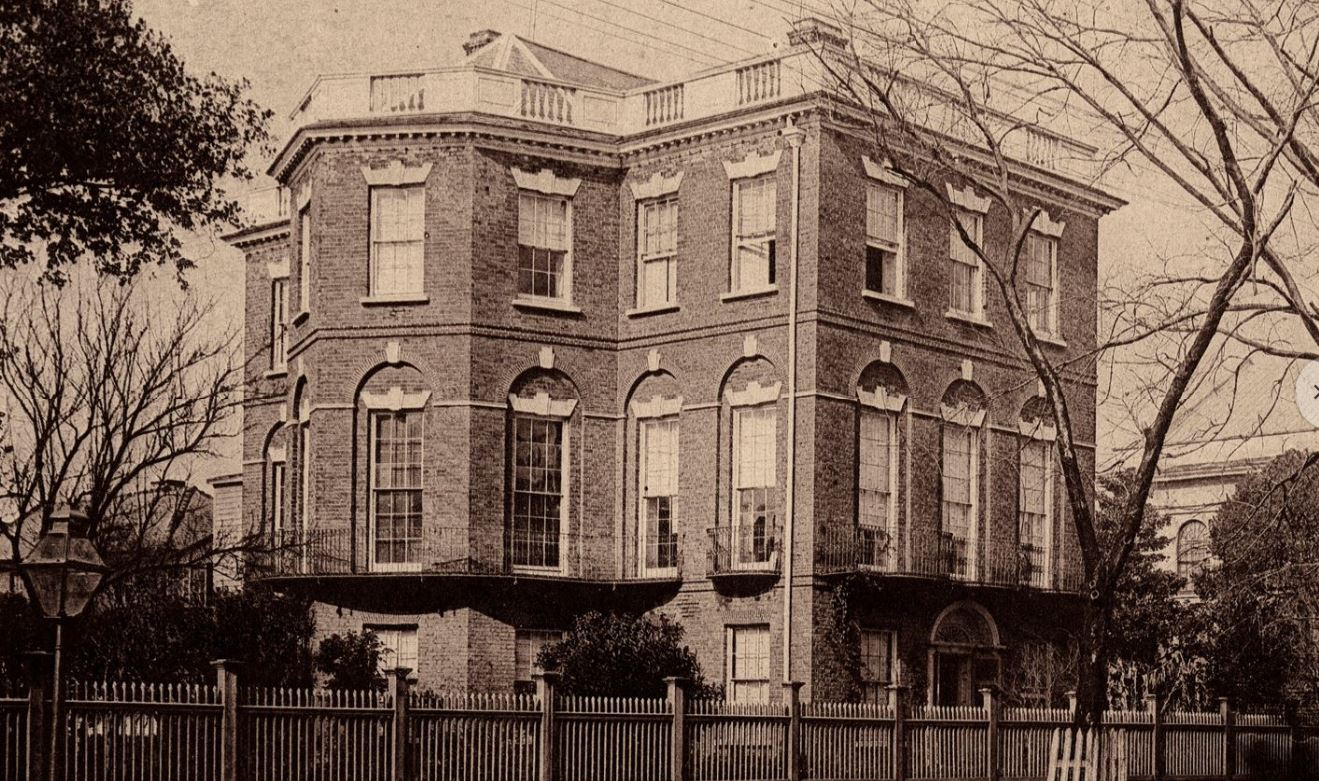
Nathaniel Russell House (1883)

In 1765, Nathaniel Russell relocated from Rhode Island to Charleston, where he prospered as a slave merchant. In 1788, at the age of 50, he married Sarah Hopton, the daughter of an affluent Charleston family. As one of Charleston's more prominent citizens, Russell required a residence commensurate with his status. He began construction of his house in 1803, and completed it five years later (at the age of 70).

Nathaniel and Sarah Russell had two daughters, Alicia Hopton Russell and Sarah Russell Dehon. Dehon inherited her father's house and lived there until her death in 1857, after which her children sold it to Robert Allston, a prominent rice planter who lived there while he was governor of South Carolina. In 1870, Allston's executors sold it to the Sisters of Our Lady of Mercy, who used it as a boarding school until 1905, when the Mullally and Pelzer families converted it back to private use. In 1953, the owners offered the house for sale and in 1955, having failed to find a buyer, proposed subdividing the property. Historic Charleston Foundation, formed in 1947, resolved to preserve it intact, raised $65,000 (~$714,829 in 2024), bought the house and grounds, and soon thereafter opened the house to the public.

In 1995, the foundation began a multi-year program of research and reconstruction to restore the house's architectural details and interior finishes to their 1808 appearance.

Grants and donations have enabled the foundation to acquire a significant collection of objects with a Charleston provenance, allowing it to show visitors an interpretation of the lifestyle of Charleston's early 19th-century merchant class.

The Nathaniel Russell House was designated a National Historic Landmark in 1960 and added to the National Register of Historic Places in 1973.

In December 2023, after a year-long self-study, the board of Historic Charleston Foundation decided to sell the house and use the proceeds to support its other interests. Following an intense backlash from the preservation community, donors, and others, the board of directors of Historic Charleston Foundation reversed course and voted to retain the museum house in January 2024.

== House and grounds ==
=== Architecture ===
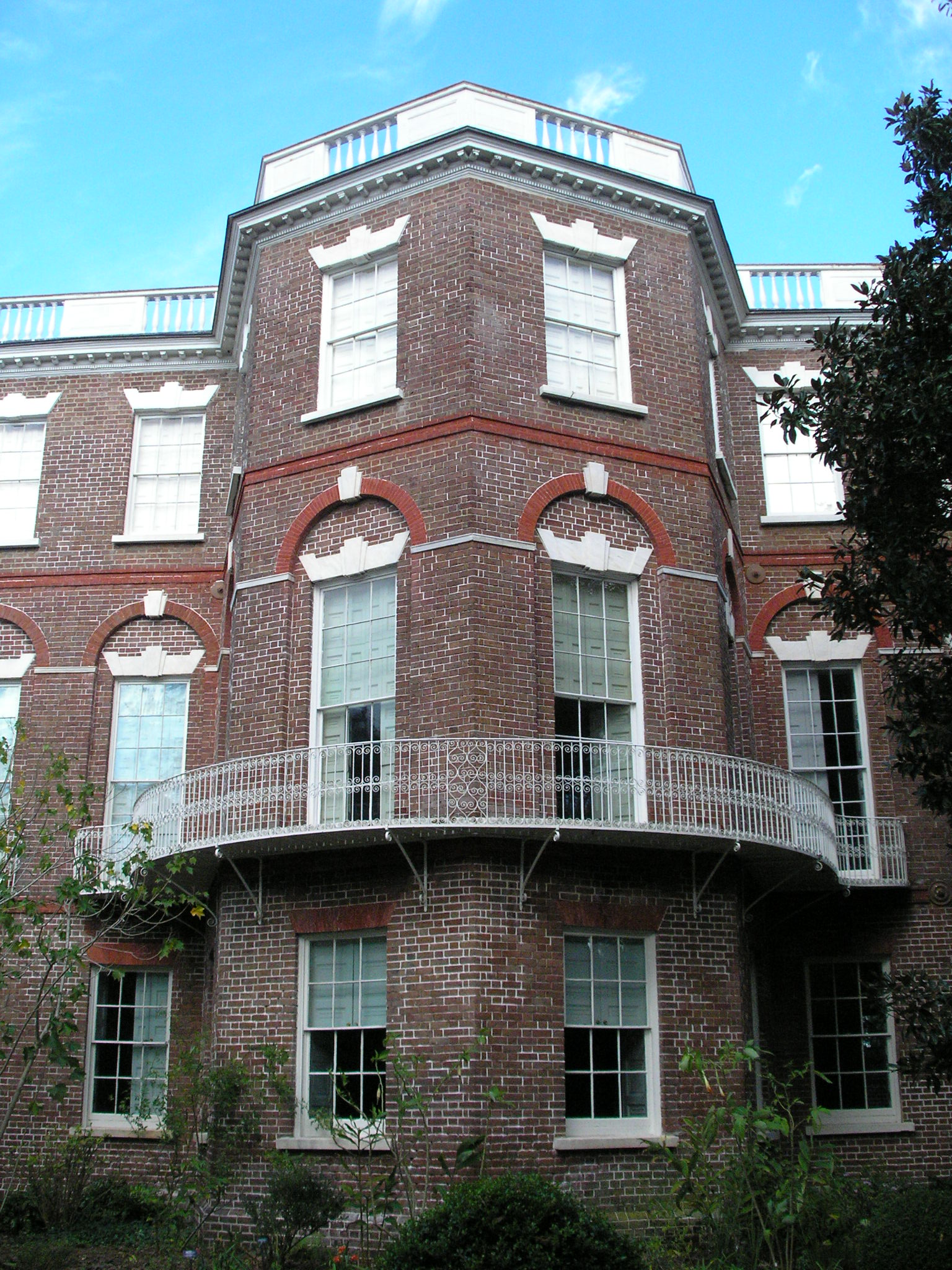
South bay of the house

Russell commissioned an unknown architect to build a large townhouse in the then fashionable Federal style. Sited on a large lot in downtown Charleston, the house is rectangular in plan, three stories tall, and faced in gray Carolina brick. A bracketed cornice and paneled balustrade separate the walls from the low hip roof, concealing it from view to better express the pure geometrical shapes of the house.

The more important facades—the entrance facade, facing east, and the garden facade, facing south—are treated formally and arranged symmetrically. The windows of the second, most important story (piano nobile), the "bel etage", are the tallest; all 11 are capped with marble voussoirs and set into niches with red brick arches. The whole ensemble is connected by a continuous stone string course, creating a kind of architectural necklace running around the house's east and south sides.

The entrance facade's principal feature is its single-leaf, faux-grained, eight-paneled door, surmounted by an elliptical transom and flanked by four fluted pilasters. On the floor above, an elegant iron balcony with bowed, elliptical projections bearing the monogram "NR" spans the facade's full three-bay width.

The south side's principal feature is the polygonal bay rising the full height of the house. A second balcony, as light and elegant as the first but lacking the monograms, wraps around the bay, emphasizing the preeminence of the second story.

An elaborate tripartite window dominates the north facade, placed to sit indoors between landings of the house's elliptical staircase.

The house is 9,600 square feet (890 m^{2}) with 6,000 square feet (560 m^{2}) of living area.

=== Interior ===
Elliptical spiral staircase, which ascends three floors

The house's interior exemplifies the neoclassical style (often called Federal style in the United States; late-Georgian or Adam style in Great Britain; and Louis Seize in France), popular during the last two decades of the 18th century and the first two of the 19th. In their interior design, neoclassical architects and craftsmen often created rooms in a variety of geometrical shapes (square, circular, ovoid, elliptical), embellished with elaborate plaster decoration and striking polychrome. The Nathaniel Russell House has three main rooms per floor, each of different geometric designs: a rectangular room in front; a central oval room, and a square room in the rear.

==== First floor ====
The rectangular entrance hall has a black-and-white diamond-patterned floorcloth edged with a leaf motif. The adjacent office was where Russell conducted business. Separating the public rooms at the front of the house from the more private rooms used by the family, wide faux-grained double doors with glazed rosette patterned insets and an elliptical, fan-shaped transom give access to the golden-walled stair hall that showcases the house's best-known architectural feature, the cantilevered spiral staircase, which rises to the third floor. The asymmetrical hall is illuminated by a Palladian window and ornamented by trompe-l'œil painting resembling a plaster cornice and an elliptical medallion painted by Charleston artisan Samuel O'Hara. Off the central stair hall is the oval dining room, with turquoise walls that appear painted but are small squares of unpatterned wallpaper bordered with red and gold interlocking rings above cypress wainscoting painted white. The heart-pine floors and the wood interior shutters are original. At the rear of the house is a square parlor that was enlarged at a later date to connect the house to the kitchen, and was used by the family for everyday dining.

==== Second floor ====
The second-floor oval drawing room, to which the women of the house retired after dinner, is the house's most decorated room. Papered in apricot, its elaborate plaster moldings are embellished with 24-karat gold leaf. Plinth blocks at the base are painted to resemble lapis lazuli. The fireplace mantles' Adam-style ornamentation are among the city's most detailed. The curved entry doors are faux-grained to resemble flame-grained mahogany on the exterior and tortoise shell on the interior. Curved, mullioned mirrors on one side of the room balance the windows on the other and reflect light into the room.

The large rectangular withdrawing room at the front of the house has soft gray walls and white wainscoting topped by a multilayered gilded cornice. The windows are surrounded by tall slender pilasters and overhanging entablatures that give the walls character. With windows on three sides, the room was used primarily during the day to take advantage of the daylight and breezes. At the rear of the house is a square master bedroom; additional bedrooms are on the third floor. Though most of the art and furniture displayed in the house is not original to the Nathaniel Russell House, it is from the period when the Russell family inhabited the house, and much is of Charleston origin.

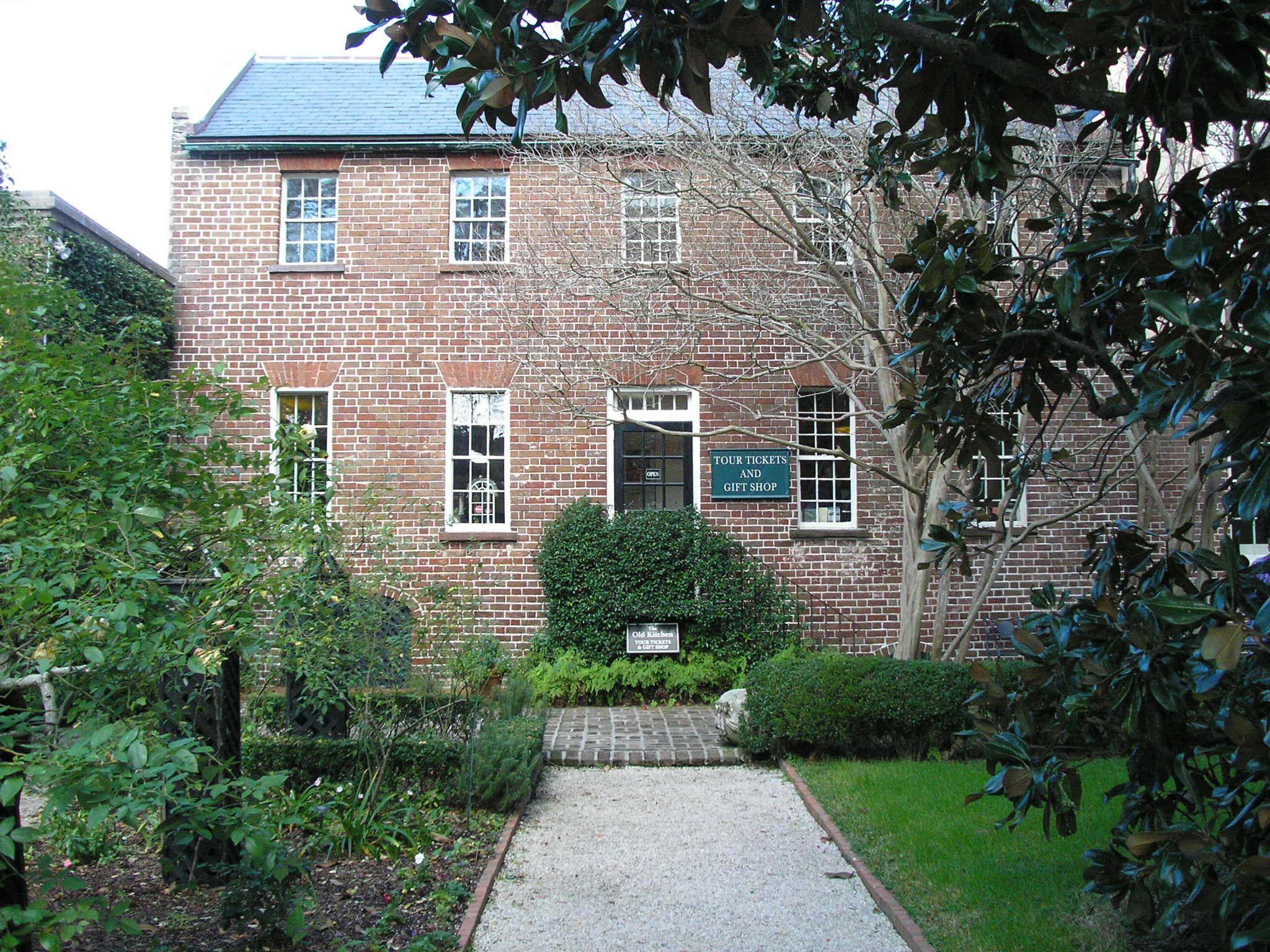
Nathaniel Russell House Slave Quarters

=== Grounds ===
The house and grounds are separated from the street by a wrought iron fence set atop a low brick wall, with an iron entrance gate flanked by tall brick piers capped with limestone ball finials. To the south of the house is the garden that was originally laid out in a geometric arrangement with patterned beds of flowers, ornamental shrubs, and large orange and grapefruit trees. Today there is a formal English garden with gravel paths, boxwood hedges, and plants favored in the 19th century. In the rear of the house is the two-story basemented slave quarters where many of the house's estimated 18 slaves lived.

== Gallery ==
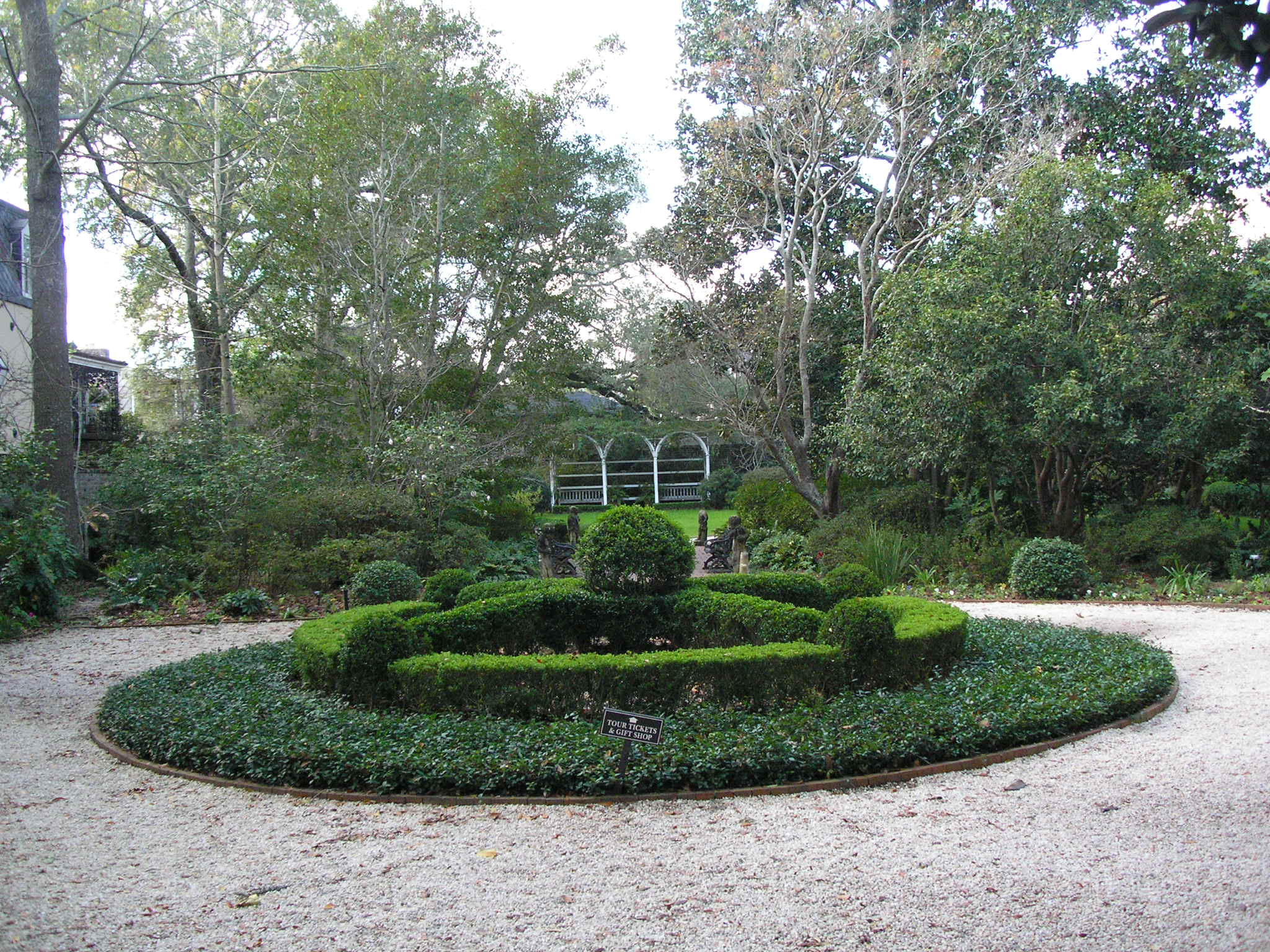
View of the gardens, ending in a small green lawn, surrounding the house

== See also ==
- Charleston Female Seminary
- Edmondston-Alston House
- List of National Historic Landmarks in South Carolina
- National Register of Historic Places listings in Charleston, South Carolina
