= States Rights Gist =

Confederate States Army general (1831–1864)

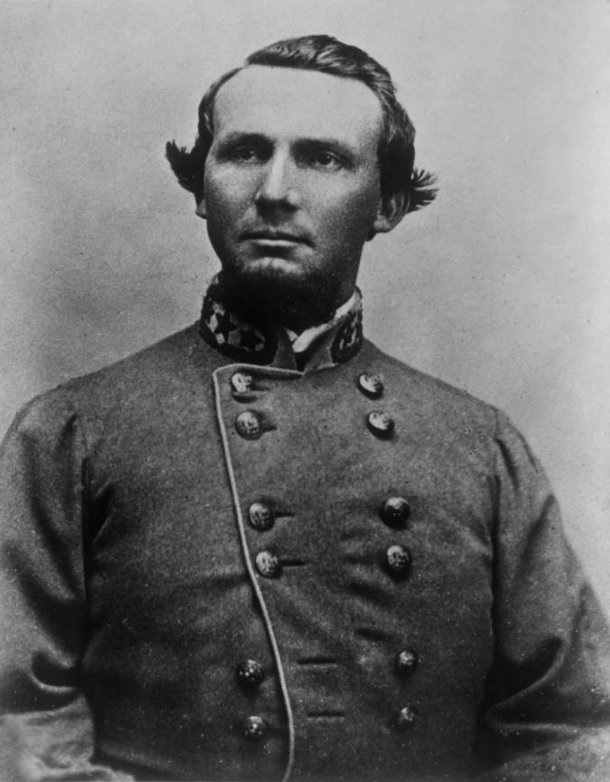
- Photo taken between 1862 and 1864
- Born: September 3, 1831; Union, South Carolina, US
- Died: November 30, 1864 (aged 33); Franklin, Tennessee
- Burial place: Trinity Episcopal churchyard Columbia, South Carolina
- Military career
- Allegiance: United States; Confederate States
- Branch: South Carolina South Carolina militia Confederate States Army
- Service years: 1856–61 (S.C. Militia); 1861–64 (CSA)
- Rank: Brigadier General (S.C. Militia); Brigadier General (CSA)
- Conflicts: American Civil War: First Battle of Bull Run; Battle of Jackson; Battle of Secessionville; Battle of Chickamauga; Chattanooga campaign; Atlanta Campaign; Battle of Franklin †

States Rights Gist (September 3, 1831 – November 30, 1864) was a lawyer and militia general in South Carolina, and later a Confederate Army brigadier general during the American Civil War. He gained prominence during the war but was killed at the Battle of Franklin on November 30, 1864. Gist was named after the Southern states' rights doctrine of nullification, reflecting the political beliefs of his father, Nathaniel Gist, a follower of John C. Calhoun.

== Early life and education ==
Gist, known to his family as "States", was born in 1831 in Union, South Carolina, to Nathaniel Gist and Elizabeth Lewis McDaniel. He was the ninth of ten children and the seventh son. As a youth, he attended Mount Zion, a Presbyterian preparatory school in Winnsboro, South Carolina.

Gist began his studies at South Carolina College (now the University of South Carolina) in 1847 and graduated in 1850. He later attended Harvard Law School from 1851 to 1852, completing two six-month semesters but leaving with one remaining before attaining a degree. After ending his legal education, he returned to Union, South Carolina, where he read law with an established firm, passed the bar, and established his own practice.

== Pre-war service ==
=== State militia ===
Soon after his return to South Carolina in 1853, Gist served in the state militia as captain of a volunteer company. He became aide-de-camp to Governor James Hopkins Adams in 1854. By April 1856 Gist was elected as a brigadier general in the South Carolina Militia. One of his many roles was to train fellow militia members for war.

=== Governor's office ===
His older cousin, William Henry Gist, who served as governor between 1858 and 1860, appointed States Rights Gist as "especial" aide-de-camp. General Gist moved to Columbia to become part of the household of his cousin, the governor.

In April 1860, States Gist resigned from the militia and became a full-time advisor to Governor Gist. In October 1860, the governor sent his cousin to six other governors of Southern states to seek support for secession due to the likely election of Abraham Lincoln as the next President of the United States.

== Civil War ==
=== Fort Sumter ===
In January 1861, following South Carolina's secession from the Union on December 20, 1860, Governor Francis Pickens appointed Gist as State Adjutant and Inspector General. In this role, Gist acquired weapons and mobilized military manpower across the state. He also briefly oversaw preparations for the state's occupation of Charleston Harbor and Fort Sumter.

In February 1861, the newly formed Confederate government assumed control of this operation and appointed General P.G.T. Beauregard to command. Gist accompanied Pickens and Beauregard for the raising of state and Confederate flags over Fort Sumter following its surrender on April 14, 1861.

=== First Manassas ===
In July 1861, Gist was assigned by General Joseph E. Johnston to the Confederate Army of the Potomac as a volunteer aide-de-camp to another South Carolina general, Brig. Gen. Barnard Bee, and accompanied Bee on July 20, 1861 to the First Battle of Manassas. Bee was killed during the battle soon after giving Stonewall Jackson his famous nickname. General Beauregard assigned Gist to lead the 4th Alabama Regiment after Bee and the regiment's Colonel Jones were killed in the battle. Gist himself was slightly wounded.

=== Coastal defenses ===
After the Battle of First Manassas, Gist returned to Columbia to prepare state forces to defend Port Royal in the fall of 1861 and to be absorbed into the Confederate Army in winter 1862. On March 20, 1862, through the influence of Confederate Senator James Chesnut of South Carolina (the husband of Mary Chesnut, who became known as a diarist of the war and its effect on planter society), Gist was appointed a brigadier general in the Confederate Army. He commanded the James Island military district and a brigade in coastal defenses between May 1862 and May 1863. During this time, McLeod Plantation was used as a headquarters.

Gist was third in command of Confederate forces at the Battle of Secessionville in June 1862, commanded troops sent to oppose a landing by Union forces at Pocotaligo, South Carolina in October 1862, led a small division of reinforcements in North Carolina between December 1862 and January 1863, and was present at the Union naval attack on Charleston on April 7, 1863. He was not personally involved in combat operations at any of these battles or events.

=== Vicksburg ===
In May 1863, Gist and Brig. Gen. W.H.T. Walker led two brigades of South Carolina troops to reinforce Confederate forces under Gen. Joseph E. Johnston in Mississippi. They were trying to relieve Confederate forces under attack at Vicksburg by the Union Army, then commanded by Major General Ulysses S. Grant in a push to take the fortress city to gain control of the Mississippi River.

After arriving in Mississippi, Walker was promoted to major general and Gist's brigade was placed in Walker's division. They participated in the Vicksburg campaign and the Battle of Jackson, Mississippi. Johnston's efforts in the Vicksburg campaign were unsuccessful and the fortress city fell to the Union Army under General Grant on July 4, 1863.

=== Chickamauga and Chattanooga ===
After the Vicksburg campaign, in August 1863 Walker's division was sent to Chattanooga, Tennessee to join General Braxton Bragg's Army of Tennessee. Gist's brigade was stationed first at Rome, Georgia, but on September 17, 1863, Gist was ordered to return with his brigade to Walker's division.

Gist and his men arrived at the Battle of Chickamauga on the morning of September 20, 1863 to find that Gist had to take command of the division because Walker was in temporary command of a corps. Gist's brigade lost 170 men in 45 minutes as they tried to plug a hole in the line of Maj. Gen. John C. Breckinridge.

Gist again commanded Walker's division during the Third Battle of Chattanooga in November 1863. The division served as the rear guard for the retreat of Breckinridge's corps from Missionary Ridge. While many of Bragg's principal subordinates opposed him during the turmoil in the Army of Tennessee in the fall of 1863, Walker and Gist remained loyal to Bragg.

=== Atlanta ===
Gist's brigade remained with Walker's division during the Atlanta campaign. During the Battle of Atlanta Walker was killed and Gist was wounded in a hand on July 22, 1864. On July 24, 1864, Walker's division was broken up and Gist's brigade was assigned to the division of Maj. Gen. Benjamin F. Cheatham. Gist returned to duty a month later after recuperating from his wound.

=== Franklin-Nashville campaign ===
After the Battle of Atlanta, Gist commanded a brigade under Maj. Gen. John C. Brown during Lt. Gen. John Bell Hood's Franklin-Nashville campaign.

=== Death at Franklin ===
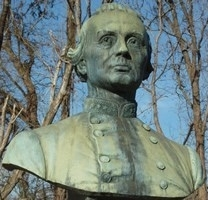
A bust of Gist by George T. Brewster at Vicksburg National Military Park

Gist was shot in the chest while leading his brigade in a charge against U.S. fortifications at the Battle of Franklin on November 30, 1864. He continued leading on foot after his horse had been shot. Sources conflict on his death: some state he died soon after at a field hospital in Franklin, Tennessee, while others claim he was killed instantly on the battlefield.

According to Walter Brian Cisco in States Rights Gist: A South Carolina General of the Civil War, Gist was first struck by bullets in his thigh but refused to leave the battlefield. He was then fatally wounded by a .58 caliber bullet to his right lung. He asked his aide, Lieutenant Trenholm, to take him home to his wife before being rushed to a field hospital. A doctor there recorded his time of death as 8:30 p.m. and his final words as "take me to my wife".

Gist was one of twelve Confederate generals who were casualties that day, six of whom were killed in action.

== Personal life ==
In April 1863, Gist married Jane Margaret Adams, daughter of South Carolina Governor James Hopkins Adams. The wedding was a brief, rushed ceremony between Gist's coastal defense duties and his deployment to Vicksburg, Mississippi in May, allowing the couple only 48 hours together. Gist saw his wife once more on a brief furlough around Christmastime, after the Battle of Missionary Ridge in November 1863 but prior to the Atlanta campaign.

=== Notable relatives ===
- William Gist, grandfather, captain in the South Carolina Loyalists and fought at the Battle of King's Mountain
- Joseph Gist, brother, Representative in the South Carolina General Assembly
- Joseph Gist (1775–1836), uncle, U.S Representative from South Carolina from 1821 to 1827
- William Henry Gist (1807–1874), cousin, Governor of South Carolina from 1858 to 1860
- Christopher Gist (1706–1759), uncle of William Gist, Colonial explorer
  - Nathaniel Gist (1733–1812), son of Christopher Gist, Continental Army soldier
  - Mordecai Gist (1743–1792), nephew of Christopher Gist, served as a general in the Continental Army
  - George Gist or Sequoyah (1740–1833), grandson of Christopher Gist, inventor of the Cherokee alphabet

== Legacy ==
Gist was initially buried in a cedar box near the Franklin battlefield on the property of a sympathetic local family. A monument at this location (35°53′19.62″N 86°52′41.94″W) reads:

The Tragedy of Franklin quite possibly may have been averted had this scholarly South Carolina Blue Blood been given the promotion to division command that his service record warranted. Completely reorganizing the South Carolina State Militia, the South Carolina College graduate made sure his home state was ready when Lincoln was elected. Taking command of Barnard Bee's brigade after Bee's death at First Manassas, Gist was promoted to Brigadier General on March 20, 1862. He fought gallantly at Chickamauga, Chattanooga, and in the Atlanta Campaign. As the Brigade assembled in front of Franklin on November 30, 1864, it was still smarting (the 24th SC in particular) from the lack of initiative that had deprived it of victory the night before at Spring Hill. The Brigade, made up of The [sic] 46th, 65th & 2nd Battalion Georgia Sharpshooters, and the 16th and Crack [sic] 24th South Carolina slammed into the 72nd Illinois and 111th Ohio causing the 72nd to "Break and Run" [sic]. Having his horse shot from under him, Gist sprinted for the locust abatis, Gist went down with a bullet in the chest. He died the next morning at The Harrison House. He was buried, first in a private cemetery in Franklin, then and finally, at Trinity Episcopal Church in Columbia, South Carolina.

As noted in the inscription, in 1866, his widow, Jane Gist, retrieved his body. Believing he belonged to all of South Carolina, she had him buried in the Trinity Episcopal churchyard in Columbia, the state capital. His grave is marked by a broken column, adorned with a stone garland at the top and a relief of a palmetto tree at the base.

There is a statue of Gist in Vicksburg, Mississippi (32°19′16″N 90°53′6″W).

Gist's death was memorialized in Franklin by a street named "Gist Street" (35.912245°N 86.874106°W), at the approximate location where he was shot, at its intersection with Columbia Pike.

== See also ==
- List of American Civil War generals (Confederate)
- States Rights Gist at Find a Grave
