= Chicora Wood Plantation =

Historic house in South Carolina, United States

- U.S. National Register of Historic Places
- U.S. Historic district – Contributing property
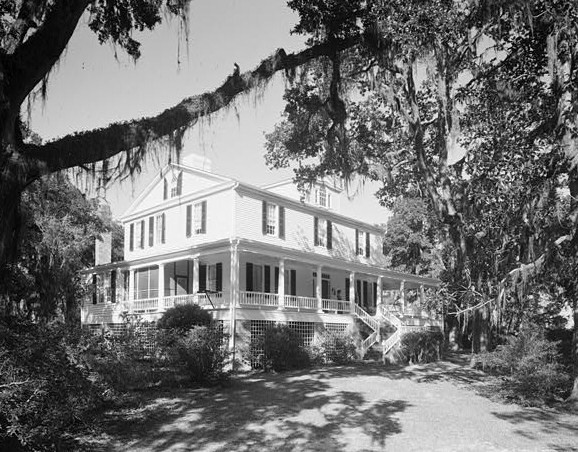

- Location within South Carolina Location within the United States
- Location: 12 miles northeast of Georgetown on County Road 52, near Georgetown, South Carolina
- Coordinates: 33°31′3″N 79°10′32″W
- Area: 40 acres (16 ha)
- Built: 1819
- Architectural style: Greek Revival
- NRHP reference No.: 73001710
- Added to NRHP: April 11, 1973

The Chicora Wood Plantation (originally known as Matanzas) is a former rice plantation in Georgetown County, South Carolina. The plantation itself was established sometime between 1732 and 1736 and the 1819 plantation house still exists today. In 1827, Robert Francis Withers Allston (1801–1864) resigned as surveyor-general of South Carolina to take over full-time management of Chicora Wood, which he had inherited from his father. Chicora Wood served as a home base for his network of rice plantations, which produced 840,000 pounds of rice in 1850 and 1,500,000 pounds by 1860. 401 slaves worked the plantation in 1850, increasing to 630 by 1860.

When R. F. W. Alston died, he left Chicora Wood to his wife. Their daughter Elizabeth Allston Pringle gained ownership of Chicora Wood in 1896 when her mother died. Pringle's books A Woman Rice Planter and Chronicles of Chicora Wood describe life on the plantation. Pringle managed Chicora Wood from 1896 until her death there in 1921.

The house was built in Greek Revival style, on a raised basement typical of the region. A number of outbuildings still survive on the complex, including the rice mill complex. It was listed in the National Register of Historic Places on April 11, 1973. It is located in the Pee Dee River Rice Planters Historic District.
