= Rose Hill Plantation State Historic Site =

Historic site in Union County, South Carolina

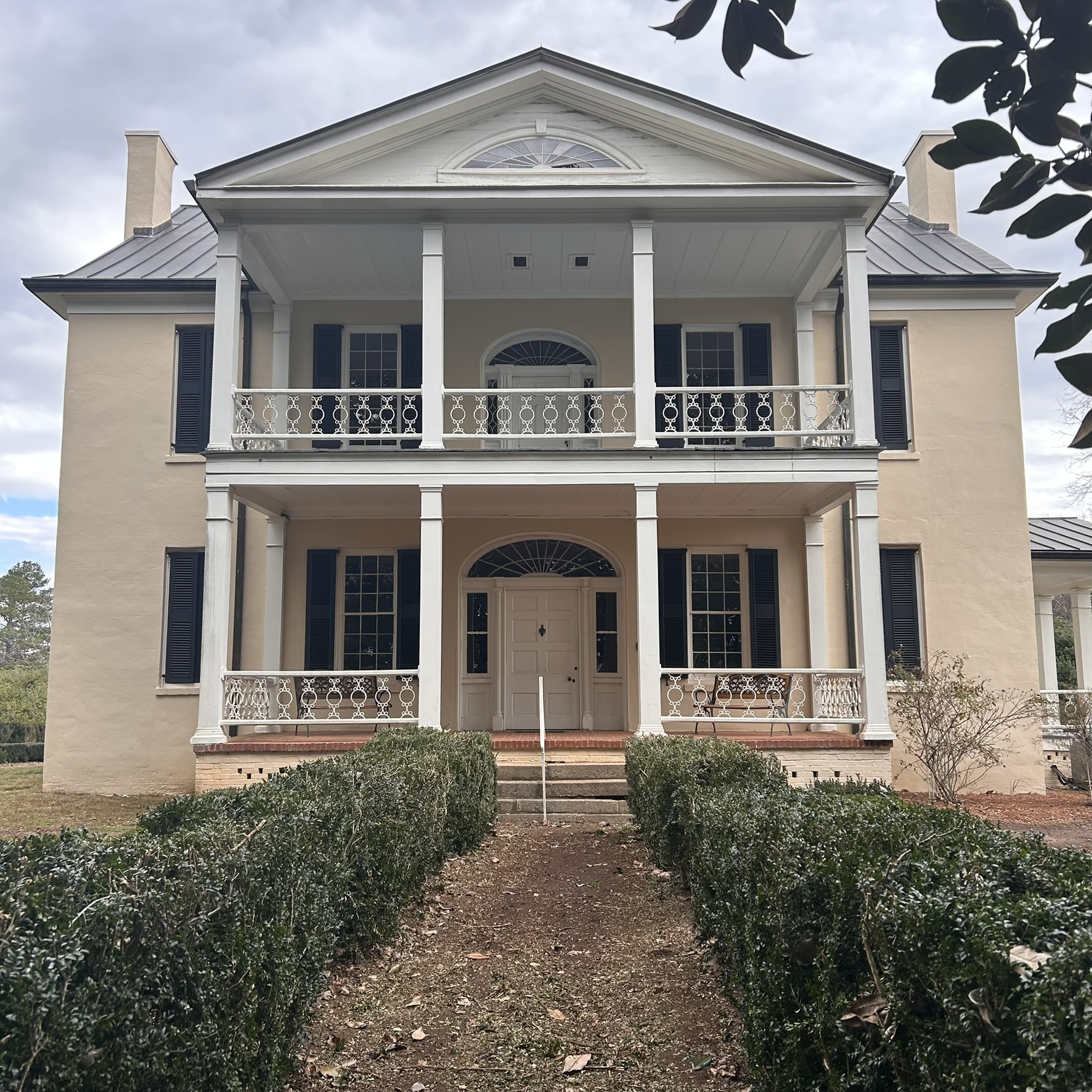
- The Gist mansion in 2026
- Interactive map of Rose Hill Plantation State Historic Site
- Nearest city: Whitmire, South Carolina
- Coordinates: 34°36′19″N 81°39′57″W
- Area: 44 acres (0.18 km^{2})
- Created: 1960
- Website: http://www.southcarolinaparks.com/park-finder/state-park/540.aspx
- Rose Hill
- U.S. National Register of Historic Places
- Location within South Carolina Location within the United States
- Area: 44 acres (18 ha)
- Built: 1832
- Architect: William H. Gist
- NRHP reference No.: 70000605
- Added to NRHP: June 5, 1970

Rose Hill Plantation State Historic Site is a historic site in Union County, South Carolina, that preserves the home of William H. Gist (1807–1874), the 68th governor of South Carolina. Gist helped instigate a Secession Convention in South Carolina, which led to the creation of the Ordinance of Secession that preceded the Civil War.

William Gist was the natural son of Francis Fincher Gist (c. 1773–1819), a Charleston merchant and South Carolina state representative, who by 1811 had purchased land in Upstate South Carolina. Either Francis Fincher or William Henry built a Georgian-style brick house (c. 1811–1830), eventually called Rose Hill after the many varieties of roses planted in its formal gardens.

In the late 1850s and early 1860s, William Gist remodeled the house, adding two-tiered back and front porches and stuccoing the brick in order to transform the exterior into the more fashionable Greek revival-style. The final house had three stories, the first two used as living quarters and the third a mixture of living and storage areas. According to the South Carolina Department of Archives and History, Rose Hill featured "more refined ornamentation than usually found in upcountry houses of the period." A spiral staircase led to the second floor, which included a ballroom with two fireplaces so that the space could be converted into two bed chambers to accommodate guests.

During Gist's term of office (1858–1860), the house served as the governor's mansion. From Rose Hill, Gist wrote the governors of Louisiana, North Carolina, Mississippi, Georgia, Alabama, and Florida, suggesting that if Abraham Lincoln were elected president, South Carolina might take the lead in seceding from the Union.

Rose Hill was a working plantation of about 2,000 acres (8.1 km^{2}) where enslaved laborers grew cotton, corn, and oats. (There were approximately 20 slaves in 1820, 82 in 1840, and 178 in 1860). After slavery was abolished at the end of the Civil War, the plantation was farmed by tenant farmers and sharecroppers.

Gist died in 1874, but the mansion and land remained in the Gist family, though both were leased to tenants. In 1938 the US Forest Service purchased Rose Hill, and it became part of the Sumter National Forest. In 1942 Clyde T. Franks (1885–1970), a representative of the Federal Land Bank and an antique collector from Laurens, South Carolina, purchased the house and 44 acres (0.18 km^{2}) from the Forest Service; and in the following year, he opened the house to the public, restoring it and the gardens and adding period furniture. In 1960, Franks sold the property to the South Carolina State Park Service.

The park includes restrooms, a picnic shelter, and a small gift shop. A brick kitchen built in the 1850s is the only other antebellum structure on the property. The location of the slave quarters is unknown. A one-and-a-quarter mile nature trail runs through both park and Forest Service property and extends to the Tyger River. The Gist family cemetery is about one mile south of the mansion.

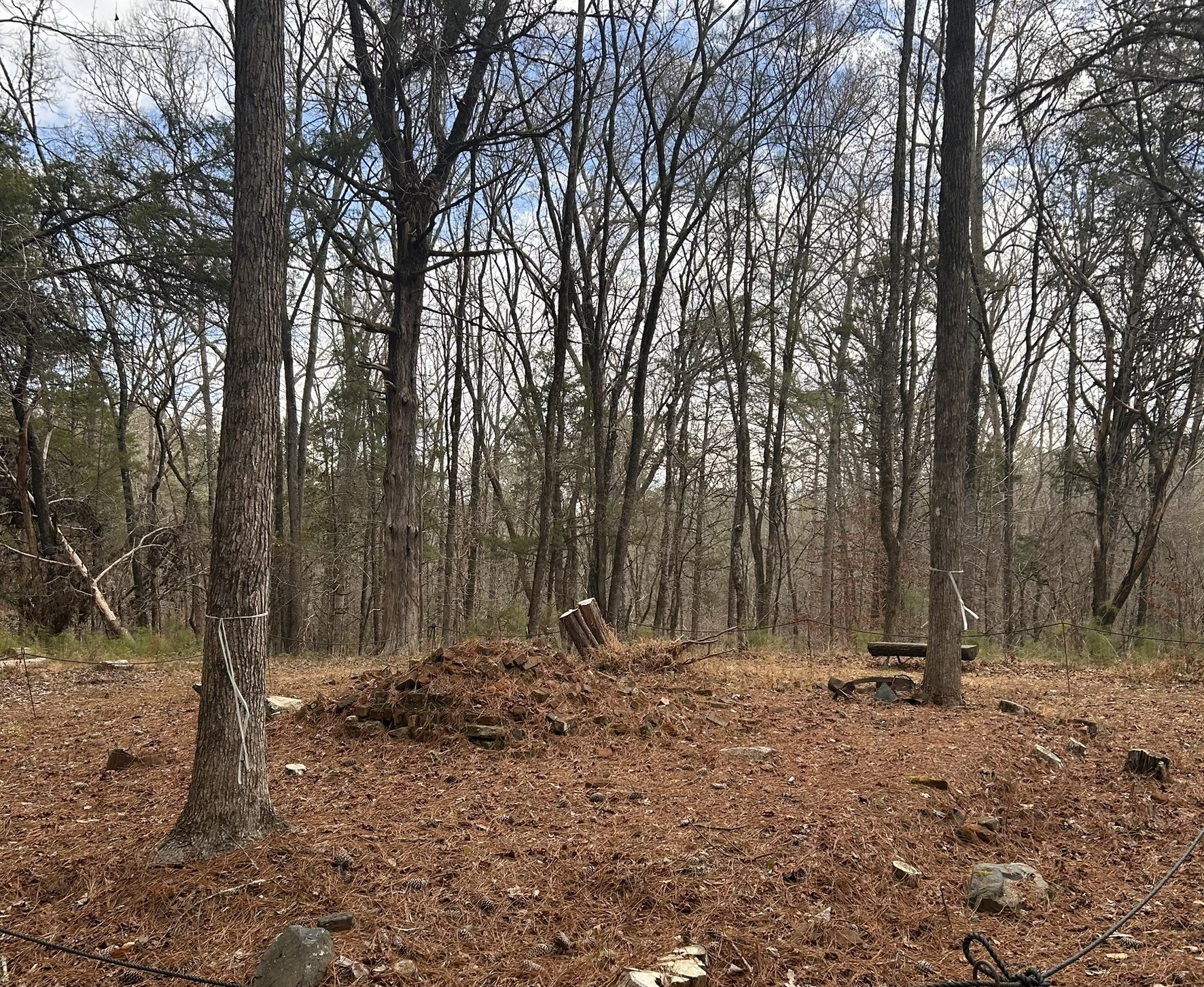
The approximate location of tenant housing in the 1940s

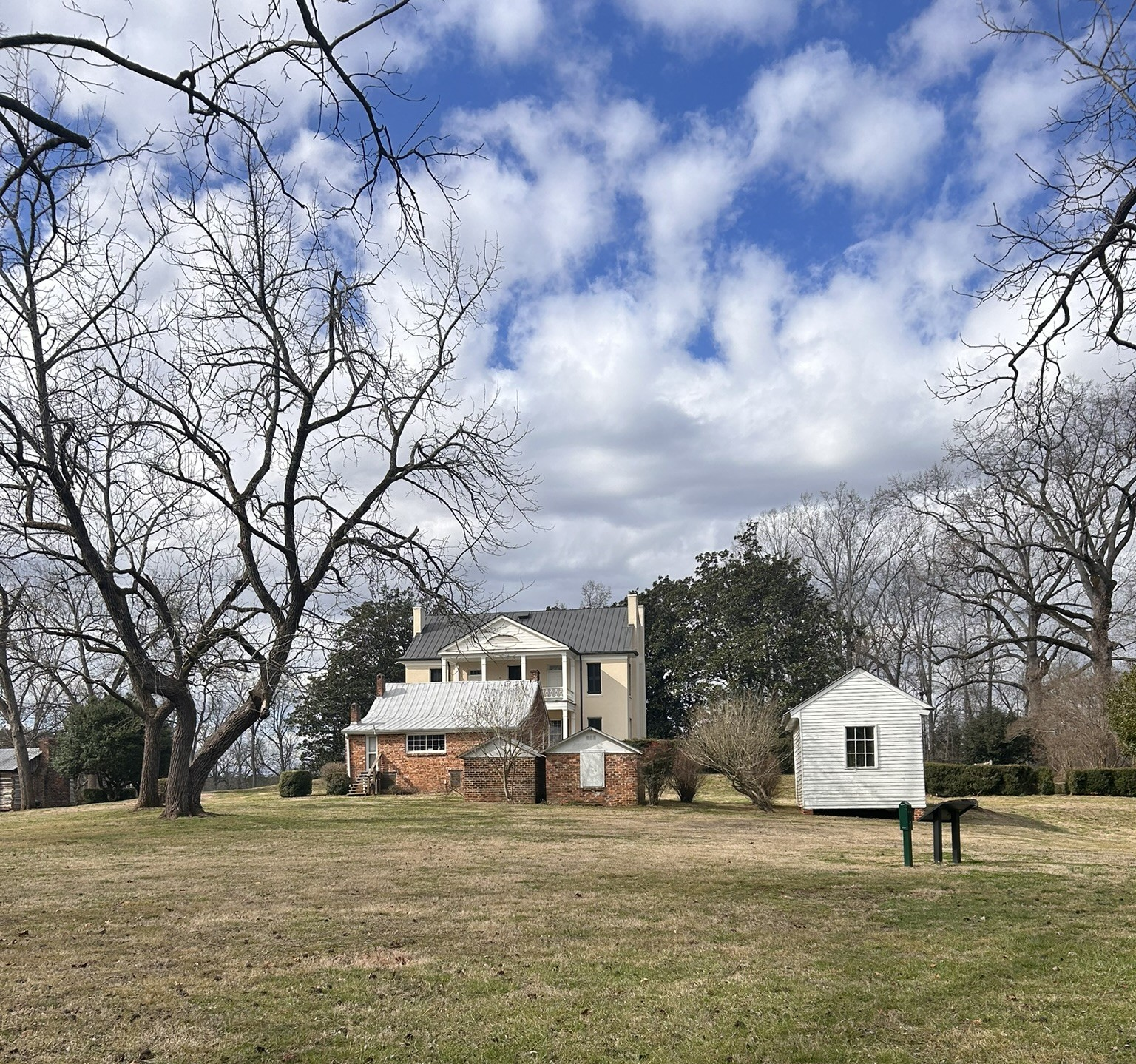
Backside of the Gist mansion, the Loom house, and the park office.

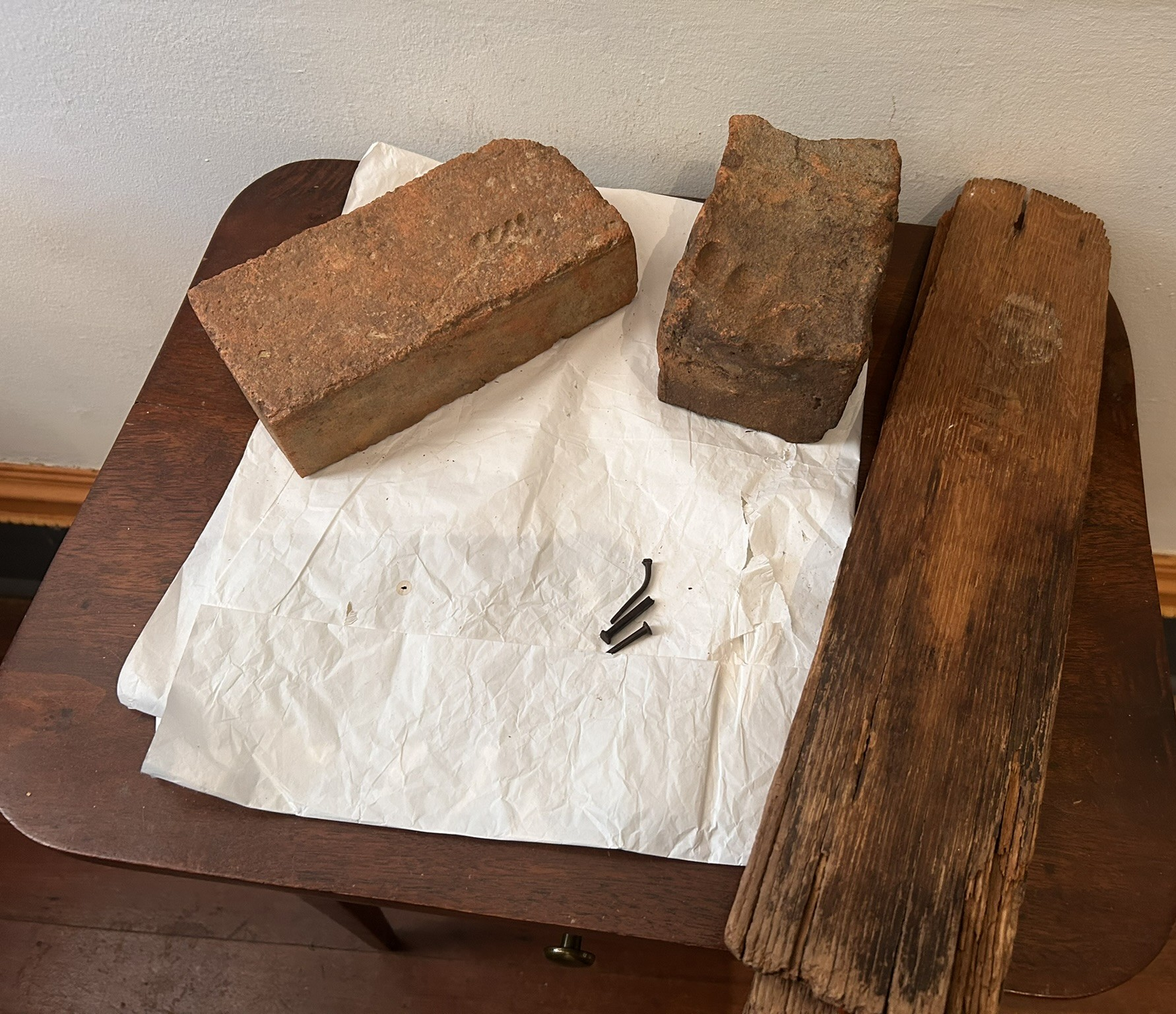
Two bricks made for the house; one has a finger print and the other has an animal print, wood from the old roof, and nails found on the property.
