= Joshua John Ward =

American politician

- Born: November 24, 1800; Brookgreen Plantation, Georgetown County, South Carolina
- Died: February 27, 1853 (aged 52); Brookgreen Plantation Georgetown County, S.C.

Joshua John Ward, of Georgetown County, South Carolina, is known as the American who was the largest slaveholder at the time of his death in 1853, dubbed "the king of the rice planters".

In 1850, Ward owned 1,092 enslaved people; In 1860, Ward's heirs (his estate) inherited 1,131 slaves.

The Brookgreen Plantation, where Ward was born and later lived, has been preserved. In 1992, it was designated a National Historic Landmark District. The house and plantation are part of a nature and sculpture garden, Brookgreen Gardens.

== Family ==
Ward was born on November 24, 1800, at the Brookgreen Plantation in South Carolina. He was the son of Joshua Ward, a planter and banker, and Elizabeth Cook, a housewife.

Ward married Joanna Douglas Hasell in South Carolina on March 14, 1825. They lived with their family at Brookgreen Plantation. Joshua John Ward died there on February 27, 1853.

== Career ==
Born into the planter class, Ward was taught the skills and knowledge to take on such responsibilities as an adult. He was likely tutored at home as part of his education. During his life, Ward inherited Brookgreen Plantation and acquired several others, using the land for rice production, the major commodity crop in antebellum South Carolina.

Ward became politically active in the Democratic Party, which plantation owners dominated in the antebellum years. Ward was elected as the 44th lieutenant governor of South Carolina, serving from 1850 to 1852 under Governor John Hugh Means.

== Legacy ==
Brookgreen Plantation has been preserved as part of Brookgreen Gardens Park. The plantation and its contributing buildings were designated National Historic Landmark District in 1992 after being listed on the National Register of Historic Places in 1978.

Political offices
Preceded by William H. Gist	Lieutenant Governor of South Carolina; 1850–1852	Succeeded by James Irby
