= Mt. Zion Institute High School =

- U.S. National Register of Historic Places
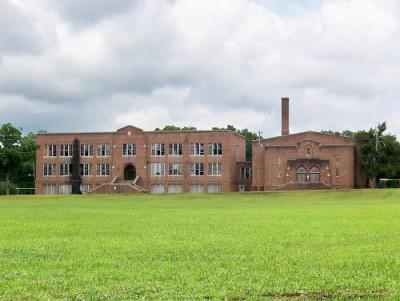

- Location within South Carolina Location within the United States
- Location: 250 N. Walnut St., Winnsboro, South Carolina
- Coordinates: 34°23′02″N 81°05′02″W
- Area: 3 acres (1.2 ha)
- Built: 1777
- NRHP reference No.: 100004445
- Added to NRHP: September 30, 2019

Mt. Zion Institute High School is a historic school complex (a collection of three buildings) located at Winnsboro, South Carolina.

== History ==
The school was constructed on a land which was donated in 1777 to Mt. Zion Society for establishing Mt. Zion Institute. It was envisioned as a preparatory school in the Upstate for the sons of "wealthy planters" throughout South Carolina. Closed in 1780 by occupying British forces, it was reopened in 1784 under the leadership of Rev. Thomas McCaule, a Presbyterian minister trained at the College of New Jersey.

In 1878, the school converted from a private academy to a public school, becoming the Upstate's first public school and the second outside of Charleston.

The current structures, all constructed by 1936, include an elementary school, a high school, a cafeteria, a gymnasium, an auditorium, and a teacherage (seen below). The elementary school building, constructed in 1922, was destroyed by fire in 1981. The other buildings continued to serve Winnsboro's students until 1990. At the time of closure, it was the site of Mt. Zion Elementary school.

In 2018, the Fairfield County Council voted to renovate the building with the hope of utilizing it for administrative buildings for the county. Costs were estimated at approximately $8.9 million. It was added to the National Register of Historic Places in 2019.

== Notable alumni ==
- James Henry Carlisle, former president of Wofford College
- William Porcher DuBose, American priest
- William McMillan, Delegate to the 6th United States Congress from the Northwest Territory
- David R. Evans, U.S. House Representative from South Carolina (1813–1815)
- John Taylor, 51st Governor of South Carolina (1826–1828)
- John Hugh Means, 64th Governor of South Carolina (1850–1852)
- David Wyatt Aiken, U.S. House Representative from South Carolina (1877–1887)
- John Bratton, U.S. House Representative from South Carolina (1884–1885)
- States Rights Gist, Confederate Army brigadier general during the American Civil War
