= William Henry Gist =

American politician (1807–1874)

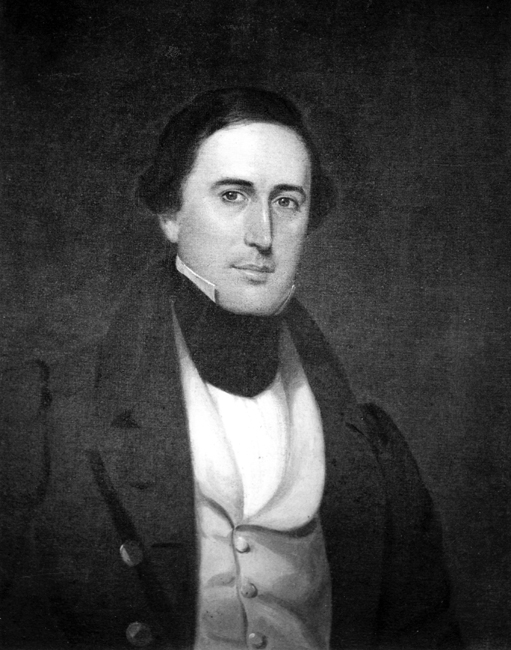

68th Governor of South Carolina
- In office December 10, 1858 – December 14, 1860
- Lieutenant: Merrick E. Carn
- Preceded by: Robert Francis Withers Allston
- Succeeded by: Francis Wilkinson Pickens

43rd Lieutenant Governor of South Carolina
- In office December 12, 1848 – December 13, 1850
- Governor: Whitemarsh B. Seabrook
- Preceded by: William Cain
- Succeeded by: Joshua J. Ward

Member of the South Carolina Senate from Union District
- In office November 25, 1844 – November 24, 1856
- Preceded by: William Kennedy Clowney
- Succeeded by: Joseph Fincher Gist

Member of the South Carolina House of Representatives from Union District
- In office November 23, 1840 – November 25, 1844

Personal details
- Born: August 22, 1807 Charleston, South Carolina, US
- Died: September 30, 1874 (aged 67) Union County, South Carolina, US
- Party: Democratic
- Spouse(s): Louisa Bowen; Mary Rice
- Profession: Politician

William Henry Gist (August 22, 1807 – September 30, 1874) was the 68th governor of South Carolina from 1858 to 1860 and a leader of the secession movement in South Carolina. He was one of the signers of the Ordinance of Secession on December 20, 1860, which effectively launched the Confederate States of America.

== Early life and career ==
Born in Charleston, South Carolina, on August 22, 1807, Gist was the illegitimate child of merchant Francis Fincher Gist and Mary Boyden. He moved with his father to Union County, South Carolina, in 1811 and came under the guardianship of his uncle, Nathaniel Gist, upon the death of his father in 1819. His uncle legally obtained the Gist last name for William Henry and sent him to Columbia to study law at South Carolina College (which became the University of South Carolina after the Civil War ended). Gist was expelled in 1827 because he had led a boycott of Steward's Hall due to the living restrictions imposed by the trustees of the college.

Nevertheless, Gist passed the bar examination and returned to Union to build Rose Hill Plantation on the land that his father had left him. Bricks were made on-site to construct the 2 1/2-story Georgian style mansion, and it took four years to complete. He successfully managed the plantation, and it steadily grew in size and importance. Twice, Gist ran into difficulties with the law for alleged involvement in duels, but both times escaped without punishment.

== Political career ==
Gist won election to the South Carolina House of Representatives in 1840 as a strong supporter of states' rights and chattel slavery, and he was elected to the South Carolina Senate in 1844. He served three terms in the SC state Senate before being elected by the General Assembly as the 68th governor of South Carolina. Gist's home at Rose Hill Plantation served as the Governor's Mansion during his term as governor.

Gist was bitterly opposed to the presidential candidacy of Abraham Lincoln in November 1860, and Gist had discussed with governors of other Southern states what course of action they would take if Lincoln were elected. Gist believed that because the United States of America was created through a compact among sovereign states, the states retained their sovereign powers and could leave the Union if the federal government failed to protect their rights and privileges. Receiving assurances from the governors of Florida and Mississippi that they would follow South Carolina's lead, Gist called for a secession convention to be held in Columbia on December 17, 1860. The convention was moved to Charleston because of a smallpox outbreak in Columbia, and Gist was one of the signers of the Ordinance of Secession on December 20, 1860. Florida and Mississippi signed their own Ordinance of Secession in January 1861.

The creation of the South Carolina Executive Council in 1861 provided Gist with an opportunity to participate in the state's wartime activities of the Civil War. He was in charge of the Department of Treasury and Finance and later the Department of Construction and Manufactures, but the dissolution of the South Carolina Executive Council in September 1862 ended his involvement in the politics of the state.

Gist had two sons who fought for the Confederacy the youngest being David Christopher Gist. His eldest son William was killed by a Union sharpshooter outside of Chattanooga, Tennessee in 1863. Gist was the cousin of States Rights Gist, a Confederate brigadier general who died leading a charge at the Battle of Franklin, Tennessee, in 1864.

== Later life ==
After the Civil War ended in 1865, Gist took an oath of allegiance in Greenville, South Carolina, and received a pardon from President Andrew Johnson. He returned to Rose Hill Plantation, which had survived the Civil War and Sherman's March to the Sea because the Broad River was in flood stages and the Union troops could not get through. Gist remained at Rose Hill and rented out the land to sharecroppers. He hated the Reconstruction government that was in power from 1868 until the time of his death. He developed appendicitis and died on September 30, 1874. Gist is buried in the family plot near the mansion.

== See also ==
- Confederate States of America, secessionists and conventions

Political offices
| Preceded by William Cain | Lieutenant Governor of South Carolina; 1848–1850 | Succeeded by Joshua J. Ward |
| Preceded by Robert Francis Withers Allston | Governor of South Carolina; 1858–1860 | Succeeded by Francis Wilkinson Pickens |
