= Elizabeth Allston Pringle =

American author (1845–1921)

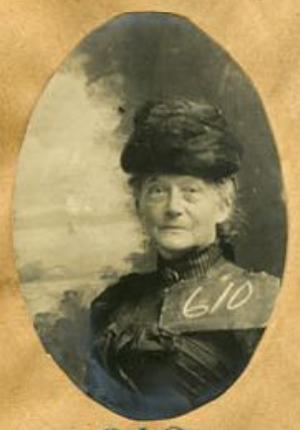
- Born: Elizabeth Waties Allston; May 29, 1845; Canaan Seashore, near Pawleys Island, South Carolina
- Died: December 5, 1921 (aged 76); Georgetown County, South Carolina
- Other names: Patience Pennington
- Occupations: Writer, Plantation Owner
- Notable work: A Woman Rice Planter (1913), Chronicles of Chicora Wood (1922)
- Spouse: John Julius Pringle (m. 1870–1876)
- Children: 1 (died in infancy)
- Father: Robert Francis Withers Allston

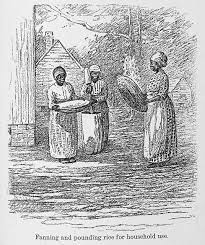
An illustration by Alice Ravenel Huger Smith from "A Woman Rice Planter" (1913)

Elizabeth Waties Pringle (née Allston; May 29, 1845 – December 5, 1921) was an American plantation owner and writer who published under the pseudonym Patience Pennington. She owned and managed Chicora Wood and White House, both rice plantations in Georgetown County, South Carolina.

== Early life and education ==
Elizabeth Waties Allston was born on May 29, 1845, at Canaan Seashore, her family's summer home near Pawleys Island. Her father, Robert Francis Withers Allston, was a wealthy plantation owner and politician who served as the Governor of South Carolina from 1856 to 1858. Robert F. W. Allston owned seven plantations, 630 enslaved people, and over 1,400 acres of land, where rice and lumber were the primary crops. Pringle's mother was Adele Petigru Allston, sister of politician James L. Petigru.

Elizabeth grew up at Chicora Wood plantation near Georgetown, South Carolina. She was educated by a governess before attending Madame Acelie Togno's boarding school in Charleston, South Carolina at the age of nine or ten.

== Career ==
Her father, Robert Allston, died in 1864, and much of his property was claimed by creditors. Elizabeth began teaching at a boarding school until her family could return to Chicora Wood. Around 1880, after inheriting a large sum of money, she purchased the White House plantation from her late husband's family. She gained ownership of Chicora Wood plantation at the age of 51, after her mother's death in 1896.

Facing decreased profits, she began writing professionally to supplement her income. From 1904 to 1907, she published a weekly column about her life in The New York Sun. The column, and her subsequent books, were published under the pseudonym Patience Pennington.

In 1913, Elizabeth published installments of the column collectively as a book titled A Woman Rice Planter. The essays were edited to reformat them as diary entries. The book included an introduction by author Owen Wiser and illustrations of plantation life by painter Alice Ravenel Huger Smith. A Woman Rice Planter reportedly sold well and provided her with increased financial stability. Her second book, Chronicles of Chicora Wood, a memoir of her life from childhood through the American Civil War and Reconstruction, was published posthumously in 1922.

She served as the South Carolina Vice-Regent for the Mount Vernon Ladies' Association from 1903 to 1921.

== Personal life ==
Elizabeth Waties Allston married John Julius Pringle, a plantation owner and neighbor of her family's, on April 26, 1870. The couple lived at White House plantation and had one child, a son who died in infancy.

John Pringle died of malaria in 1876 when Elizabeth Pringle was 31 years old. Pringle then moved in with her mother at Chicora Wood and helped care for her brother's children.

Elizabeth Pringle died at Chicora Wood on December 5, 1921, at the age of 76.
