= John Hugh Means =

American politician

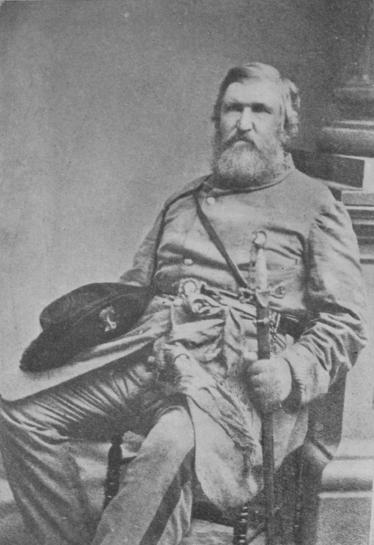
- John Hugh Means

64th Governor of South Carolina
- In office December 16, 1850 – December 1, 1852
- Lieutenant: Joshua John Ward
- Preceded by: Whitemarsh Benjamin Seabrook
- Succeeded by: John Lawrence Manning

Personal details
- Born: August 18, 1812 Fairfield County, South Carolina
- Died: September 1, 1862 (aged 50) Prince William County, Virginia
- Party: Democratic
- Spouse: Sarah Rebecca Stark
- Education: Mount Zion College; South Carolina College

Military service
- Allegiance: Confederate States of America; South Carolina
- Branch/service: Confederate States Army; South Carolina militia
- Years of service: 1860–1862
- Rank: Colonel (CSA); Brigadier General (state militia)
- Unit: 17th South Carolina Infantry Regiment
- Battles/wars: American Civil War: Peninsula Campaign; Battle of Malvern Hill; Northern Virginia Campaign; First Battle of Rappahannock Station; Second Battle of Manassas

John Hugh Means (August 18, 1812 – September 1, 1862) was an American politician who served as the 64th governor of South Carolina from 1850 to 1852 and an infantry colonel in the Confederate States Army during the American Civil War. He was killed in action at the Second Battle of Manassas, one of only a handful of well-known pre-war politicians to perish during the conflict.

== Early life and career ==
Born in the Fairfield District of South Carolina, Means was educated at Mount Zion College in Winnsboro and he graduated from South Carolina College in 1832. He became a planter and his outspoken support of States' rights led him to his election in the General Assembly. During the agitation for secession in the decade prior to the Civil War, Means was elected in 1850 as Governor of South Carolina by the General Assembly, with Lieutenant Governor Joshua John Ward. He presided over a state convention in 1852 that passed a resolution stating that South Carolina had the right to secede if the Federal government sought in any way to disturb the institution of slavery. Furthermore, Means prepared the state for war by increasing the funding of the state militia.

== Civil War ==
Means signed the Ordinance of Secession in 1860 and enrolled in the Confederate Army, being elected to colonel of the 17th South Carolina Infantry. The regiment saw action in Virginia at the battles of Malvern Hill during the Peninsula Campaign and then at the Rappahannock Station in prelude to the Second Battle of Manassas. As a part of Longstreets corps, the 17th Regiment arrived at 11 a.m. on August 29, 1862, to repulse an attack by Pope on the Confederates' right flank. After stopping the Union forces, the Confederates counterattacked, and Means died as a result of injuries on September 1.

Political offices
Preceded by Whitemarsh Benjamin Seabrook	Governor of South Carolina; 1850–1852	Succeeded by John Lawrence Manning
