= Whitemarsh Benjamin Seabrook =

American politician

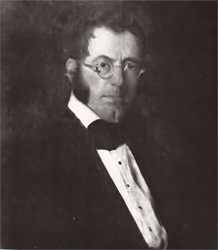

63rd Governor of South Carolina
- In office December 1, 1848 – December 1, 1850
- Lieutenant: William Henry Gist
- Preceded by: David Johnson
- Succeeded by: John Hugh Means

36th Lieutenant Governor of South Carolina
- In office December 9, 1834 – December 10, 1836
- Governor: George McDuffie
- Preceded by: Charles Cotesworth Pinckney
- Succeeded by: William DuBose

Member of the South Carolina Senate from St. John Colleton Parish
- In office November 27, 1826 – November 24, 1834

Member of the South Carolina House of Representatives from St. John Colleton Parish
- In office November 28, 1814 – November 27, 1820

Personal details
- Born: June 30, 1793 Edisto Island, South Carolina, US
- Died: April 16, 1855 (aged 61) Beaufort, South Carolina, US
- Party: Democratic
- Spouse: Margaret Wilkinson Hamilton
- Education: College of New Jersey

Whitemarsh Benjamin Seabrook (June 30, 1793 – April 16, 1855) was the 63rd governor of South Carolina from 1848 to 1850.

== Early life and career ==
Seabrook was born on Edisto Island at his family's plantation in and he received his education at the College of New Jersey from which he graduated in 1812.

He owned Gun Bluff Plantation on Edisto Island and engaged in agriculture issues of the state. For several years, Seabrook was the president of the South Carolina Agricultural Society and he stressed the need upon the farmers of the state for diversification of crop. In addition, Seabrook wrote the History of the Cotton Plant and A concise view of the critical situation, and future prospects of the slave-holding states, in relation to their coloured population.

Seabrook wrote an essay in which he advocated keeping enslaved African Americans in stocks overnight "as a powerful auxiliary in the cause of good government."

== Political career ==
In 1814, at the age of 21, Seabrook gained election to the South Carolina House of Representatives and served until his election to the South Carolina Senate in 1829. Beginning in 1825, Seabrook was involved in campaigning to close Black schools in Charleston. In the early 1830s he led a campaign inspired by other Southern states to limit black literacy and religion by passing a law that would ban the teaching of slaves and free Black people to read. In 1834, this law was successfully passed. After five years in the Senate, the General Assembly elected him as the 36th Lieutenant Governor in 1834. The General Assembly elected Seabrook as Governor in 1848 and he pushed for reform of education in the state. He lamented that only the upper class of South Carolina was provided with education and that the middle and lower classes received almost little if any education. Local officials were even encouraged by Seabrook to pass additional taxes to fund education. Furthermore, Seabrook organized the teachers of the state into the Teachers' Association, but it collapsed after he left office.

== Later life ==
Upon the expiration of his term in 1850, Seabrook returned to his plantation on Edisto Island. He remained active in politics and participated in the Southern Rights Convention of 1852. On April 16, 1855, in Beaufort, Seabrook died and he was interred on his plantation.

Political offices
Preceded by Charles Cotesworth Pinckney	Lieutenant Governor of South Carolina; 1834–1836	Succeeded by William DuBose
Preceded by David Johnson	Governor of South Carolina; 1848–1850	Succeeded by John Hugh Means
