= White (surname) =

White is a surname either of English or of Scottish and Irish origin, the latter being an anglicisation of the Scottish Gaelic MacGillebhàin, "Son of the fair gillie" and the Irish "Mac Faoitigh" or "de Faoite". It is the seventeenth most common surname in England. In the 1990 United States Census, "White" ranked fourteenth among all reported surnames in frequency, accounting for 0.28% of the population. By 2000, White had fallen to position 20 in the United States and 22nd position by 2014

Notable people with the surname include:

- White (Hampshire cricketer) (active 1789–1797, full name unknown), English cricketer

== A ==
- Aaron White (basketball) (born 1992), American basketball player
- Adam White (disambiguation), multiple people
- Addison White (1824–1909), American politician
- Adlyn White (1929–2017), Jamaican educator and Christian minister
- Al White (disambiguation), multiple people
- Alan White (disambiguation), multiple people
- Albert White (musician) (born 1942), American blues guitarist, singer and songwriter
- Alex White (disambiguation), multiple people
- Alexander White (disambiguation), multiple people
- Alfie White (1909–1970), English footballer
- Alfred Holmes White (1873–1953), American chemical engineering professor
- Alfred Tredway White (1846–1921), American housing reformer
- Alice White (1904–1983), American actress
- Allie White (1915–1996), American football player
- Andrew Dickson White (1832–1918), American diplomat and co-founder of Cornell University
- Andrew White (disambiguation), multiple people
- Andy White (disambiguation), multiple people
- Anthony White (disambiguation), multiple people
- Austin White (born 1997), American professional wrestler known as Austin Theory
- Azellia White (1913–2019), American aviator

== B ==
- Barclay White (1821–1906), Superintendent of Indian Affairs under President Grant
- Barry White (1944–2003), American soul and disco singer
- Bartow White (1776–1862), US Congressman from New York
- Benjamin White (disambiguation), multiple people
- Betty White (1922–2021), American actress
- Beverly White (1928–2021), American activist and politician
- Bill White (disambiguation), multiple people
- Blaire White (born 1993), American YouTuber and political commentator
- Bob White (disambiguation), multiple people
- Bodi White (born 1956), Louisiana politician
- Bree White (born 1981), Australian rules footballer
- Brendan White (born 1992), Australian association football player
- Brett White (executive), chief executive officer of the investment firm CBRE Group
- Brian White (disambiguation), multiple people
- Briana White (born 1992), streamer and voice actor of Aerith Gainsborough
- Brooke White (born 1983), American singer-songwriter and American Idol contestant
- Bruce A. White, American politician
- Bryan D. White (1936–2017), general secretary and CEO of Moose International in Great Britain
- Buck White (1930–2025), member of the American country music vocal group The Whites
- Bukka White (Booker T. Washington White) (1909–1977), American Delta blues guitarist and singer
- Byron White (1917–2002), Associate Justice of the Supreme Court of the United States

== C ==
- Cameron White (born 1983), Australian cricketer
- Candice White, American politician
- Carole Ita White (born 1948 or 1949), American television and film actress
- Cat White (born 1993), English actress, producer and author
- Charlie White (born 1994), American YouTuber, Twitch streamer, podcaster, actor, musician, and businessman
- Charlie White (figure skater) (born 1987), American Olympic silver, bronze, and gold medalist ice dancer
- Charles White (writer) (1845–1922), Australian journalist and author
- Charline White (1920–1959), Michigan politician
- Charlotte Price White, (1873–1932), Welsh suffragist and politician
- Charmaine White Face, American human rights activist
- Chel White (born 1959), American film director
- Cheryl White (born 1955), member of the American country music vocal group The Whites
- Chilton A. White (1826–1900), US Representative from Ohio
- Christian Streit White (1839–1917), West Virginia politician
- Christopher White (disambiguation), multiple people
- Clarence White (1944–1973), American bluegrass and country guitarist (Kentucky Colonels, The Byrds)
- Claude Porter White (1907–1975), American author and composer
- Coby White (born 2000), American basketball player
- Cody White (disambiguation), multiple people
- Colin White (disambiguation), multiple people
- Colton White (born 1997), Canadian ice hockey player
- Compton I. White (1877–1956), US Representative from Idaho
- Compton I. White, Jr. (1920–1998), US Representative from Idaho
- Curtis White (disambiguation), multiple people

== D ==
- Dan White (disambiguation), multiple people
- Dana White (born 1969), American MMA promoter and president of UFC
- Danny White (born 1952), American football player
- Darren White (disambiguation), multiple people
- DaShaun White (born 2000), American football player
- Davellyn Whyte (born 1991), American basketball player
- David White (disambiguation), multiple people
- Davin White (born 1981), American basketball player
- Deacon White, aka James "Deacon" White, (1847–1939), baseball star
- DeMario White Jr. (born 1991), birth name of Moneybagg Yo, American rapper
- Denny White, Ohio politician
- Derrick White (disambiguation), multiple people
- Des White (1927–2023), New Zealand rugby league footballer
- Desmond White (footballer) (1911–1985), Scottish footballer
- Devin White (born 1998), American football player
- Devon White (baseball) (born 1962), Jamaican American baseball player
- Diamond White (born 1999), American singer and actress
- Doc White (1879–1969), American baseball player
- Donny White (1942–2021), American college sports coach and administrator
- Doris Pike White (1896–1987), American investment banker and civic leader
- Doug White (disambiguation), multiple people
- Douglas R. White (1942–2021), American anthropologist
- Duncan White (1918–1998), Sri Lankan Burgher athlete, first to win an Olympic medal for Sri Lanka

== E ==
- E. B. White (1899–1985), American children's book author
- Ed White (astronaut) (1930–1967), American astronaut
- Eden White (born 1970), American singer-songwriter
- Edith White (disambiguation), multiple people
- Edmund White (1940–2025), American writer
- Edmund White (cricketer) (1928–2004), English cricketer
- Edward White (disambiguation) (or Ed White), multiple people
- Eg White (born 1966 as Francis White), British musician, songwriter and producer
- Eli White (born 1994), American baseball player
- Elizabeth Coleman White (1871–1954), pioneering American blueberry breeder and vendor
- Ellen White (footballer) (born 1989), English footballer
- Ellen G. White (1827–1915), American Christian pioneer
- Elsie Maud White (1889–1978), New Zealand miniaturist
- Erica White (born 1986), American basketball player
- Erica White (artist) (1904–1991), British sculptor
- Erik White, American music director
- Erik White (Canadian football) (born 1970), American football player of Canadian football
- Erin White (softball) (born 1977), Canadian softball first baseman
- Estelle White (1925–2011) British hymn composer
- Esther Griffin White (1869–1954), American journalist and politician
- Ethel Lina White (1876–1944), British crime writer
- Evan White (born 1996), American baseball player

== F ==
- Faye White (born 1978), English football player
- Felix Harold White (1884–1945), English composer, music teacher and pianist
- Florence Mildred White (1874–1957), English policewoman
- Francis White (disambiguation), multiple people
- Frank White (disambiguation), multiple people
- Franklin White (dancer) (1923–2013), British ballet dancer
- Fred White (musician) (1955–2023), American musician, member of Earth, Wind & Fire
- Frederick D. White (1847–1918), Canadian politician
- Freeman White (born 1943), American football player
- Freeman White (politician) (1946–2022), Canadian politician
- Fuzz White (1916–2003), American Major League Baseball right fielder

== G ==
- Gary White (disambiguation), multiple people
- Genevieve Beatrice White (1913–2009), also known as Genevieve Pezet, American-born French artist
- George White (British Army officer) (1835–1912), British general
- George White (Ohio politician) (1872–1953), governor of Ohio
- George Henry White (1852–1918), U.S. congressman from North Carolina
- George Montgomery White (1828–1860), member of the North Carolina House of Commons
- Gilbert F. White (1911–2006), American geographer
- Gilbert White (1720–1793), English naturalist
- Gillian White (disambiguation), multiple people

== H ==
- Harold Albert White (1896–1970), British-Canadian flying ace
- Harold G. White (born 1965), American mechanical engineer, aerospace engineer, and applied physicist
- Harry Dexter White (1892–1948), American economist, US representative to the Bretton Woods Conference
- Henry White (disambiguation), multiple people
- Horace White (disambiguation), multiple people
- Horacio White (1927–2017), Argentine swimmer
- Howard White (footballer) (born 1954), English footballer
- Hugh White (disambiguation), multiple people
- Hugo White (1939–2014), British royal navy admiral
- Harvey White (born 2001), British footballer for Stevenage F.C

== I ==
- Ian White (darts player) (born 1970), English darts player
- Ian White (ice hockey) (born 1984), Canadian professional ice hockey defence man
- Ilka White, Australian textile artist
- Isobel Mary White (1912–1997), Australian anthropologist
- Israel Charles White (1848–1927), American geologist

== J ==
- Jack White (disambiguation), multiple people
- Jahiem White (born 2005), American football player
- Jake White (born 1963), South African rugby union coach
- Jaleel White (born 1976), American actor
- Jalen White (born 2002), American football player
- James White (disambiguation), multiple people
- Jamie White (born 1968), American radio host and actress
- Jan White (born 1948), American football player
- Javin White (born 1997), American football player
- Jay White (born 1992), New Zealand professional wrestler
- Jeff White (Australian footballer) (born 1977), Australian rules footballer
- Jeordie White (born 1971), American bassist and guitarist
- Jesse White (1917–1997), American actor
- Jimmy White (born 1962), English professional snooker player
- Jock White (1897–1986), Scottish footballer
- Joe White (disambiguation), multiple people
- John White (disambiguation), multiple people
- Jordan White (musician) (born 1982), American rock musician and singer-songwriter
- Jose White (American football) (born 1973), American football player
- Joseph Blanco White (1775–1841), Spanish theologian
- Joseph Leonard Maries White (1897–1925), Canadian flying ace
- Joshua White (disambiguation), multiple people
- Julian White (born 1973), English rugby union footballer
- Julie White (disambiguation), multiple people
- JJ White, American musical duo consisting of Janice and Jayne White

== K ==
- Karen Malina White (born 1965), American actress
- Karen White, English prisoner
- Karyn White (born 1965), American R&B singer during the late 1980s and early 1990s
- Katie White (born 1983), British singer in The Ting Tings
- Katie White (politician) (graduated 2003), British politician
- Keelan White (born 2001), Canadian football player
- Keion White (born 1999), American football player
- Keith White (disambiguation), multiple people
- Keith White (yachtsman) (1940s–2019), British disabled solo yachtsman
- Kelli White, American sprinter
- Ken White (1943–2025), English muralist, painter and illustrator
- Kenneth White (1936–2023), Scottish poet, academic and writer
- Kenneth S. White (1897–1976), American politician and judge
- Kerwin White, former ring name of American wrestler Chavo Guerrero, Jr.
- Kevin White (disambiguation), multiple people
- Kyzir White (born 1996), American football player

== L ==
- Lari White (1965–2018), American country music singer
- Laura White (actress) (born 1996), British actress
- Laura Rosamond White (1844–1922), American author
- Lavelle White (born 1929), American Texas blues and soul blues singer and songwriter
- Lawrence White (disambiguation), multiple people
- Lee White (actor) (1888–1949), American actor of the stage, screen and radio
- Lee White (American football) (born 1946), American football player
- Lee C. White (1923–2013), advisor to President Kennedy and President Johnson
- Leo White (1882–1948), English-American film and stage actor who appeared in many Charlie Chaplin films
- Leo White (judoka) (born 1957), member of the US Olympic judo team
- Leon White (1955–2018), American professional wrestler better known as Big Van Vader or Vader
- Leslie White (1900–1975), American anthropologist
- Lily White (photographer) (1866–1944), American photographer
- Linda White (Alpha Kappa Alpha) (1942–2010), American sorority president
- Linda White (politician) (1959/1960–2024), Australian politician
- Liz White (actress) (born 1979), British actress
- Loren H. White (1863–1923), New York state senator
- Lulu Belle Madison White (1900–1957), American teacher and civil rights activist
- Lynn White (musician) (born 1953), American soul blues singer

== M ==
- Malcolm White (cricketer) (1924–2009), English cricketer
- Malinda Brumfield White (born 1967), member of the Louisiana House of Representatives
- Margaret Bourke-White (1904–1971), American photographer and documentary photographer
- Margaret Matilda White (1868–1910), New Zealand photographer
- Marion Ballantyne White (1871–1958), American mathematician and university professor
- Mark White (disambiguation), multiple people
- Marquez White (born 1994), American football player
- Mary White (disambiguation), multiple people
- Maureen White, Canadian theatre director, actor, and playwright
- Maurice White (1941–2016), American musician, founder and leader of the band Earth, Wind & Fire
- Meg White (born 1974), American musician, drummer in The White Stripes
- Michael White (disambiguation), multiple people, includes Mike White
- Minor White (1908–1976), American photographer
- Mitchell White (disambiguation), multiple people
- Mishael White, American politician
- Molly White (disambiguation), multiple people
- Morgan White (gymnast) (born 1983), American gymnast
- Morgan White (radio DJ) (1924–2010), American radio disc jockey and actor

== N ==
- Nancy White (disambiguation), multiple people
- Nathaniel White (born 1960), American serial killer
- Nettie L. White (c. 1850–1921), American suffragist and stenographer
- Nicholas White (disambiguation), multiple people
- Noel White (rugby league) (1923–2019), Australian rugby league footballer

== O ==
- Oliver White (born 1995), British YouTube personality
- Onna White (1922–2005), Canadian choreographer and dancer

== P ==
- Pat White (American football) (born 1986), American football quarterback
- Pat White (politician) (1948–2024), American politician for West Virginia
- Patrick White (1912–1990), Australian author
- Paul Dudley White (1886–1973), American cardiologist
- Percy White (rugby league) (1888–1918), Australian rugby league footballer
- Peregrine White (1620–1704), first child born to the Pilgrims in New England
- Peter White (disambiguation), multiple people
- Portia White (1911–1968), Canadian operatic contralto

== Q ==
- Quavian White (born 2000), American football player

== R ==
- Rachaad White (born 1999), American football player
- Rachel White (disambiguation), multiple people
- Randy White (disambiguation), multiple people
- Raoul White (born 1972), Dutch politician
- Rassie Hoskins White (1862–1944), American clubwoman
- Ray White (politician), Canadian politician
- Reggie White (1961–2004), American football player
- Reggie White (defensive lineman, born 1970), American football player
- Reggie White (running back) (born 1979), American football player
- Rex White (1929–2025), American Hall of Fame racing driver
- Richard White (racing driver) (born 1939), American racing driver
- Rick White (politician) (born 1953), American politician from Washington
- Ricky White III (born 2002), American football player
- Robert White (disambiguation), multiple people
- Roddy White (born 1981), American football player
- Roderick White (1814–1856), New York politician
- Romello White (born 1998), American basketball player for Hapoel Eilat of the Israeli Basketball Premier League
- Rodney White (born 1980), American basketball player
- Ron White (born 1956), American comedian
- Rosie White (born 1993), New Zealand soccer player
- Royce White (born 1991), American basketball player
- Ruth White (fencer) (born 1951), American Olympic fencer
- Ryan White (1971–1990), American HIV/AIDS poster child, namesake of the Ryan White Care Act
- Resolved White (17th century), passenger on the Pilgrim ship Mayflower

== S ==
- Sacovie White-Helton (born 2005), American football player
- Sallie Joy White (1847–1909), American journalist
- Sammy White (disambiguation), multiple people
- Sandra White (born 1951), Scottish politician
- Seodi White, Malawian lawyer and activist
- Shaun White (born 1986), American snowboarder and skateboarder
- Sheila White (abolitionist) (born 1988), American abolitionist and human trafficking victim
- Sheila White (actress) (1948–2018), British film, television and stage actress
- Shelby White (born 1938), American investor, art collector, and philanthropist
- Shubael F. White (1841–1914), American politician and judge from Michigan
- Simon White (born 1951), British astrophysicist
- Slappy White (1924–1995), American comedian and actor
- Snowy White (Terence Charles 'Snowy' White) (born 1948), English guitarist
- Spencer White (born 1994), Australian rules footballer
- Squirrel White (born 2004), American football player
- Stanford White (1853–1906), American architect, member of the firm McKim, Mead, and White
- Stephen White (disambiguation), multiple people
- Steve White (disambiguation), multiple people
- Steven White (disambiguation), multiple people
- Stewart White (journalist) (born 1947), British television newsreader and presenter
- Stewart Edward White (1873–1946), American novelist and outdoorsman
- Stuart White (born 2001), South African racing driver

== T ==
- T. H. White (1906–1964), English author, known for The Once and Future King
- Ted White (author) (born 1938), American science fiction writer and music critic
- Terri White (born 1948), American singer and actress
- The Whites, American country music vocal group
- Theodore H. White (1915–1986), American journalist
- Thomas White (disambiguation) (or Tom White)
- Timothy White (disambiguation) (or Tim White)
- Todd White (disambiguation), multiple people
- Tony White (disambiguation), multiple people
- Tony Joe White (1943–2018), American singer-songwriter
- Tre'Davious White (born 1995), American football player
- Trey White (born 2004), American football player
- Tyler White (born 1990), American baseball player

== V ==
- Vanessa White (born 1989), British singer and songwriter
- Vanna White (born 1957), American television personality
- Verdine White (born 1951), American musician, younger brother of Maurice White, bass guitarist in Earth, Wind & Fire
- Victor White (aviator) (1895–1967), British World War I flying ace
- Victor White (priest) (1902–1960), Dominican priest
- Vince White (born 1960), English guitarist who replaced Joe Strummer in The Clash
- Violetta Susan White (1875–1949), American mycologist

== W ==
- Walker White (born 2005), American football player
- Walter Francis White (1893–1955), American civil rights activist
- Warren White (disambiguation), multiple people
- Webster White (1860–1923), American politician from Maryland
- Wendy White (netball) (born 1940), Welsh netball player, coach, administrator
- Wendy White (mezzo-soprano) (born 1953), American opera singer
- Wendy White (tennis) (born 1960), American tennis player
- Wendy Tan White (born 1970), British businesswoman
- Wendy White (artist) (born 1971), American artist
- Wilbert White (1889–1918), American military aviator
- Sir Willard White (born 1946), Jamaican-born British operatic bass-baritone
- William White (disambiguation), multiple people
- Willie White (disambiguation), multiple people

== Z ==
- Zamir White (born 1999), American football player

== Fictional characters ==
- Brad White, a character in 2001 psychological horror movie Frailty
- Burnice White, from the video game Zenless Zone Zero
- Cammy White, from the Street Fighter video game series
- Carrie White, title character from the Stephen King novel and movie Carrie
- Frank White, lead character in the 1990 film King of New York
- Helen White, the main character in 1949 American comedy movie Miss Grant Takes Richmond
- Perry White, supporting character in the Superman comics
- Jason White, a character from South Park
- Snow White, protagonist of German fairy tales
- Mrs. White, one of six original Cluedo characters
- Redd White, from the video game Phoenix Wright: Ace Attorney
- Walter White, the main protagonist of Breaking Bad
  - Skyler White
  - Walter White Jr.
  - Holly White
- Warren White, a DC comics supervillain
- Trooper White, a minor character in the video game TimeSplitters 2
