= Edward White =

Edward, Ed, or Eddie White may refer to:

== Arts and entertainment ==
- Edward White (composer) (1910–1994), British composer
- Edward Gates White (1918–1992), American musician
- Edward J. White (1903–1973), American film producer
- Edward Lucas White (1866–1934), American writer, fantasy
- Eddie White (director) (born 1981), Australian actor and animation director

== Politics ==
- Edward White (Australian politician) (1869–1959), member of the Victorian Legislative Council
- Edward D. White Sr. (Edward Douglass White, 1795–1847), governor of Louisiana and U.S. representative
- Edward Douglass White (1845–1921), chief justice of the U.S. Supreme Court
  - SS Edward D. White, a Liberty ship

== Sports ==
- Edward White (boxer) (1899–1984), British Olympic boxer
- Edward White (cricketer) (1844–1922), English cricketer
- Ed White (American football) (born 1947), American football offensive lineman, Vikings and Chargers
- Ed White (Australian rules footballer) (1922–2012), Australian rules footballer
- Ed White (baseball) (1926–1982), American Major League Baseball player
- Ed White (golfer) (1913–1999), American amateur golfer and retired engineer
- Ed White (wrestler) (1949–2005), Canadian wrestler, known as "Sailor" or "Moondog King"
- Eddie White (baseball), Negro league baseball player
- Eddie White (footballer) (born 1935), Scottish association football player
- Eddie White (rugby league) (1883–1962), Australian rugby league footballer

== Others ==
- Edward White (Free-Church minister) (1819–1898), London Free Church minister
- Edward White (Medal of Honor) (1877–1908), Philippine–American War soldier and Medal of Honor recipient
- Edward White (printer) (c. 1548 – c. 1612), English printer
- Edward White (landscape architect) (1873–1952), English landscape architect and garden designer
- Edward Brickell White (1806–1882), American architect
- Edward D. White Jr. (1925–2017), American architect
- Edward John White (1831–1913), Anglo-Australian meteorologist and astronomer
- Edward Higgins White Sr. (1901–1978), United States Air Force general
- Ed White (astronaut) (1930–1967), American astronaut
- G. Edward White (born 1941), American legal historian and professor of law

== See also ==
- Ted White (disambiguation)
- Edmund White (1940–2025), American novelist
- Edmund White (cricketer) (1928–2004), English cricketer
