= Robert White =

Robert White may refer to:

== Entertainment ==
- Robert White (composer) (1538–1574), English composer
- Robert White (guitarist) (1936–1994), American Motown session guitarist
- Robert White (sculptor) (1921–2002), American sculptor
- Robert White (tenor) (1936–2026), American tenor of Irish descent
- Rusty White (Robert L. White, born 1945), American founder of the Robb Report

== Government and politics ==
- Bob White (mayor) (1914–2006), mayor of Papatoetoe, Auckland, New Zealand
- Robert White (attorney general) (1833–1915), West Virginia Attorney General
- Robert White (Australian politician) (1838–1900), New South Wales politician
- Robert White (judge) (1759–1831), American military officer, lawyer, politician, and judge
- Robert J. White (judge), (born 1985) American judge
- Robert J. White (Arkansas politician), served in the Arkansas House in 1999 from Camden, Arkansas
- Robert White (Washington, D.C., politician) (born 1982), District of Columbia council member and non-voting representative-elect
- Robert White (West Virginia state senator) (1876–1935), American lawyer and politician
- Robert E. White (1926–2015), U.S. ambassador
- Robert John White, Northern Ireland politician, mayor of Coleraine
- Robert Smeaton White (1856–1944), Canadian journalist and political figure
- Robert W. White (mayor) (1922–1985), mayor of Scarborough, Ontario, Canada

== Medicine and science ==
- Robert White (Virginia physician) (1688–1752), Scottish-American physician and surgeon
- Robert J. White (1926–2010), American surgeon
- Robert L. White (engineer) (1927–2023) American engineering professor and cochlear implant pioneer
- Robert M. White (meteorologist) (1923–2015), American meteorologist
- Robert W. White (psychologist) (1904–2001), American psychologist
- Bob White (geophysicist) (born 1952), English geophysicist

== Sports ==
- Robert White (American football) (1912–1969), American college football coach
- Robert White (Australian footballer) (1895–1982), Australian rules footballer
- Robert White (baseball), American baseball player
- Rob White (cricketer) (born 1979), English cricketer and umpire
- Robert White (handballer) (born 1983), British handball player
- Robert White (sailor) (born 1956), British Olympic sailor
- Robert W. White (golfer) (1876–1959), Scottish-American golf course architect and golf administrator
- Robbie White (born 1995), English cricketer

== Other ==
- Robert White (bishop) (died 1761), primus of the Scottish Episcopal Church, 1747–1761
- Robert White (British Army officer) (1827–1902), British general
- Robert White (engraver) (1645–1703), English draughtsman and portrait engraver
- Robert White (priest), English Anglican priest
- Robert White (serial killer) (born 1960), American serial killer
- Robert White (antiquary) (1802–1874), Scottish antiquary
- Robert C. White (born 1953), chief of police of the Denver Police Department, Denver, Colorado
- Robert L. White (collector) (c. 1949–2003), American collector
- Robert Meadows White (1798–1865), English cleric, professor of Anglo-Saxon at the University of Oxford
- Robert Michael White (1924–2010), United States Air Force veteran and test pilot
- Robert P. White (born 1963), United States Army general
- Bobby White (21st century), American police officer

== See also ==
- Bert White (disambiguation)
- Bob White (disambiguation)
- Rob White (Formula One) (born 1965), English Formula One engineer
- Robert Wight (1796–1872), Scottish surgeon and botanist
- Robert Whyte (born 1955), Australian author, editor and journalist
- Robert Whyte (judge) (1787–1844), justice of the Tennessee Supreme Court
- Robert White Johnson (born c. 1952), American songwriter
