= Anthony Whyte =

Anthony Whyte may refer:

- Anthony Whyte (soccer), Canadian-born Guyanese soccer player
- Anthony Whyte (writer), American author
- Tony Whyte (1939–2024), Irish Gaelic football player, manager and administrator

== See also ==
- Anthony White (disambiguation)
