= Douglas White =

Douglas White may refer to:

- Douglas White (jurist) (born 1945), New Zealand jurist.
- Douglas J. White (1933–2012), British operations researcher.
- Douglas R. White (born 1942), American social anthropologist.

== See also ==
- Doug White (disambiguation)
