= Stephen White =

Stephen White is the name of:

- Stephen White (author) (born 1951), author of thriller fiction best known for his Dr. Alan Gregory series
- Stephen White (Gaelic footballer) (1928–2009), Gaelic footballer from Ireland
- Stephen White (hurler) (born 1988), Irish hurler
- Stephen White (Jesuit) (1574–1646), Jesuit author
- Stephen White (political scientist) (1945–2023), Stephen Leonard White, British political scientist
- Stephen White (priest) (born 1958), Irish priest
- Stephen White (television writer), television and children's book writer
- Stephen A. White, American philosopher and classical scholar
- Stephen H. White, professor of physiology and biophysics
- Stephen K. White (born 1949), American political theorist at the University of Virginia
- Stephen M. White (1853–1901), U.S. Senator from California
- Stephen V. White (1831–1913), U.S. congressman from New York
- Stephen William White (1840–1914), secretary of the Northern Central Railway and translator of Jules Verne's novels

== See also ==
- Steve White (disambiguation)
- Steven White (disambiguation)
- Stephen Whyte (disambiguation)
