= Gillian White =

Gillian White may refer to:

- Gillian White (actress) (born 1975), American actress
- Gillian White (lawyer) (1936–2016), English professor of international law
- Gillian White (sculptor) (1939–2026), English sculptor based in Switzerland
- Gillian White (writer) (1945–2020), English novelist and journalist
