= Andrew White =

Andrew White may refer to:

== Arts and entertainment ==
- Andrew White (saxophonist) (1942–2020), American jazz saxophonist and multi-instrumentalist
- Andrew White (guitarist) (born 1974), English musician with the Kaiser Chiefs
- Andrew White (presenter) (born 1974), British television presenter
- Andrew Joseph White, American young adult fiction author

== Law and politics ==
- Andrew White (MP) (1792–1856), British shipowner and politician
- Andrew White (Australian politician) (1859–1936)
- Andrew Thomas White (died 1900), Canadian politician
- Andrew White (New Hampshire politician), American politician

== Sports ==
- Andrew White (rugby union) (1894–1968), New Zealand rugby union player
- Andrew White (Irish cricketer) (born 1980), Irish cricketer for Northamptonshire and Ireland
- Andrew White (basketball) (born 1993), American basketball player

== Others ==
- Andrew White (Jesuit) (1579–1656), English Jesuit missionary
- Andrew Dickson White (1832–1918), American diplomat, author and educator
- Andrew White (priest) (born 1964), Anglican priest known as the "Vicar of Baghdad"
- Andrew G. White, Australian scientist and educator

== See also ==
- Andy White (disambiguation)
- Drew White (disambiguation)
- Andrew Wright (disambiguation)
- Andrew Wight (1959–2012), Australian screenwriter and producer
