= Anthony White =

Anthony White may refer to:

== Arts and entertainment ==
- Tony Atlas (born Anthony White in 1954), WWE personality and former professional wrestler
- Anthony White (artist) (born 1976), Australian artist
- J. White Did It (born Anthony Jermaine White in 1984), American record producer, songwriter, and DJ
- Anthony White, member of British jazz band Acoustic Alchemy

== Other fields ==
- Anthony C. White, Bell electrical engineer who perfected the carbon microphone for telephone use
- Anthony Walton White (1750–1803), American cavalry officer in the Revolutionary War
- Tony White (cricketer) (Anthony Wilbur White, 1938–2023), former West Indian cricketer
- Anthony White (soccer) (born 2003), Canadian soccer player
- Anthony White (surgeon) (1782–1849), English surgeon

== See also ==
- Anthony Whyte (writer), African-American novelist
- Anthony Whyte (soccer) (born 1996), Canadian-born Guyanese soccer player
- Tony White (disambiguation)
