= Ted White =

Ted White may refer to:

- Ted White (author) (1938–2026), American science fiction author
- Ted White (stuntman) (1926–2022), American stuntman
- Ted White (cricketer) (1913–1999), Australian cricketer
- Ted White (politician) (born 1949), Canadian politician
- Ted White (American football) (born 1976), American football offensive coordinator
- Ted White (music manager) (1931–2020), first husband of Aretha Franklin

== See also ==
- Edward White (disambiguation)
- Theodore H. White (1915–1986), American journalist and author
