= Timothy White =

Timothy White or Tim White may refer to:

== Arts and media ==
=== Film ===
- Tim White (American producer), American film producer
- Tim White (New Zealand producer), New Zealand film producer (of many Australian films)
- Tim White (director), Australian director; directed the music video for the 2017 Client Liaison song, "A Foreign Affair"

=== Others ===
- Tim White (artist) (1952–2020), British SF artist and book illustrator
- Tim White (newscaster), American news anchor and investigative reporter
- Timothy White (photographer), American celebrity photographer
- Timothy White (writer) (1952–2002), American rock music journalist

== Sport ==
- Tim White (American football) (born 1994), American football wide receiver
- Tim White (referee) (1954–2022), American wrestling referee

== Other people ==
- Tim D. White (born 1950), American paleoanthropologist
- Timothy White, ship's chandler and pharmacist; founder of British retailer Timothy Whites
- Timothy White (abduction victim) (1974–2010), American abducted as a child
- Timothy J. White, United States Navy vice admiral
- Timothy P. White (born 1949), Argentine-born American university chancellor and kinesiologist

== See also ==
- White (surname)
