= Adam White =

Adam White or Whyte may refer to:

- Adam White (footballer) (born 1976), Australian sportsman and filmmaker
- Adam White (Medal of Honor) (1823–1895), American soldier, Medal of Honor recipient
- Adam White (minister) (c. 1627–1708), Scottish Presbyterian minister
- Adam White (MP), British member of parliament for Winchelsea
- Adam White (volleyball) (born 1989), Australian volleyball player
- Adam White (zoologist) (1817–1878), Scottish zoologist
- Adam Gowans Whyte (1875–1950), Scottish journalist, author, and translator
- Adam White (EastEnders), fictional character
