= Tony White =

Tony White may refer to:

- Tony White (gridiron football) (born 1979), American football coach and former player
- Tony White (basketball) (born 1965), American basketball player
- Tony White (cricketer) (1938–2023), West Indian cricketer
- Tony White (ice hockey) (born 1954), retired Canadian hockey player
- Tony White (writer) (born 1964), English novelist
- Tony Joe White (1943–2018), American singer-songwriter and guitarist
  - Tony Joe White (album)
- Tony Joe White (American football) (born 1973), American college football coach
- Tony White, drummer for Chrome Division
- Tony White (footballer) (born 1966), English footballer, see List of AFC Bournemouth players (1–24 appearances)

== See also ==
- Anthony White (disambiguation)
