= Laurel Stavis =

American politician

Member of the New Hampshire House of Representatives from the Grafton 13th district
- Incumbent
- Assumed office December 5, 2018
- Preceded by: Andy White

Personal details
- Party: Democratic

Laurel Stavis is an American politician. She serves as a Democratic member for the Grafton 13th district of the New Hampshire House of Representatives.

== Personal life ==
She is Jewish.
