= Bob White =

Bob White may refer to:

== People ==
=== In sports ===
- Bob White (halfback) (1929–2011), American football player
- Bob White (fullback) (1938–2025), American football player
- Bob White (offensive lineman) (born 1963), American football center
- Bob White (cricketer) (1936–2023), former English first class cricketer
- Bob White (footballer) (1902–1977), English footballer
- Bob White (ice hockey) (born 1935), Canadian ice hockey player

=== Other people ===
- Bob White (business executive) (born 1956), former Bain companies executive
- Robert Michael White (1924–2010), known as Bob, American test pilot and astronaut
- Bob White (geophysicist) (born 1952), Cambridge University professor of geophysics
- Bob White (trade unionist) (1935–2017), president of the Canadian Labour Congress and founding president of the Canadian Auto Workers trade union
- Bob W. White (active since 1998), Canadian associate professor of social anthropology
- Bobby White (1925–1973), American jazz drummer, see Earle Spencer
- Bob White (mayor) (1914–2006), mayor of Papatoetoe, Auckland, New Zealand

== Other ==
- Bob White Oranges (designated 1993), American historic citrus packing house in Florida
- Bob White, West Virginia, an unincorporated community in the U.S. state of West Virginia
- Bobwhite quail, a ground-dwelling bird of North America

== See also ==
- Robert White (disambiguation)
- Bob Whyte (1907–1983), New Zealand cricketer
