= Andy White =

Andy White may refer to:

- Andy White (drummer) (1930–2015), Scottish studio drummer
- Andy White (singer-songwriter) (born 1962), Irish singer/songwriter and poet
- Andy White (footballer, born 1948), Welsh football player for Newport County
- Andy White (footballer, born 1981), English football player for Mansfield Town and Kidderminster Harriers
- Andy White (footballer, born 1991), English football player for Gillingham
- E. B. White (1899–1985), American author, nicknamed "Andy" after Andrew Dickson White
- Andrew Dickson White (1832–1918), American educator, diplomat, and historian
- Andy White (American football), quarterback for the University of Texas Longhorns football team
- Andy White (politician), American politician

== See also ==
- Andrew White (disambiguation)
