= Claire Palley =

South African lawyer

Claire Palley, OBE
- Born: 17 February 1931 (age 95); Union of South Africa
- Education: Durban Girls' College
- Alma mater: University of Cape Town; University of London
- Awards: OBE
- Scientific career
- Fields: Constitutional and human rights law
- Workplaces: Queen's University Belfast; University of Kent; St Anne's College, Oxford

Claire Dorothea Taylor Palley (born 17 February 1931) is a South African academic and lawyer who specialises in constitutional and human rights law. She was the first woman to hold a Chair in Law at a United Kingdom university when she was appointed at Queen's University Belfast in 1970.

== Life ==
Palley was born in South Africa in 1931. She attended Durban Girls' College before she went on to study at the University of Cape Town and after graduating took up a post as a lecturer in the Law School. She lived with her then husband Ahrn Palley for a while in Southern Rhodesia. The Palleys moved to Rhodesia in the belief that it would offer a more liberal political regime than the apartheid system which then existed in South Africa. In Rhodesia, she worked on completing her PhD dissertation on the history of the constitutional law and history of Southern Rhodesia between 1888-1965 for which she would later publish a book about. From 1962-1970 Ahrn Palley was Rhodesia's only Independent MP representing the predominantly black constituency of Highfield. As an authority on constitutional and human rights law, Claire was Constitutional Adviser to the African National Council at the constitutional talks on Rhodesia held in Geneva in 1976.

Her books cover international relations and contemporary history, as seen from the standpoint of a constitutional, international and human rights lawyer, minority rights

Her pioneering appointment as the first British woman law professor in 1970 at Queen's University Belfast was initially overlooked. It was not until the appointment of Gillian White at Manchester in 1975 (the second woman to become a law professor in the United Kingdom) that Claire Palley's appointment was mentioned in The Times.

She was later Professor of Law and Master of Darwin College, University of Kent from 1973 to 1984 and became Principal of St Anne's College, Oxford in 1984. A hall of residence at St Anne's is named for her.

In 1997, she was received an OBE for services to human rights.

== Selected publications ==
- The Constitutional History and Law of Southern Rhodesia 1888-1965: With Special Reference to Imperial Control (Clarendon Press,1966)
- Constitutional Law and Minorities (Minority Rights Group, 1978)
- The United Kingdom and Human Rights (The Hamlyn Trust, 1991)
- An International Relations Debacle: The UN Secretary-General's Mission of Good Offices in Cyprus 1999-2004 (Hart Publishing, 2005)

Academic offices
Preceded by Nancy Trenaman	Principal of St Anne's College, Oxford; 1984—1991	Succeeded by Ruth Deech
