= Steve White =

Steve White may refer to:

== Sports ==
- Steve White (American football) (1973–2022), American football player
- Steve White (baseball) (1884–1975), Major League Baseball pitcher
- Steve White (footballer) (born 1959), former English footballer and manager
- Steve White (sailor) Offshore Racer

== Musicians ==
- Steve White (drummer) (born 1965), drummer for several British bands
- Steve White (guitarist) (born 1965), guitarist for KMFDM and PIG
- Steve White (saxophonist) (1925–2005), Los Angeles–based jazz saxophonist who flourished in the 1950s

== Others ==
- Steve White (actor) (born 1961), American actor and comedian
- Steve White (author) (born 1948), American science fiction writer and former Navy officer
- Steve White (comics) (born 1964), comic writer
- Steve White (judge) (born 1949), judge and former Inspector General of the California Department of Corrections and Rehabilitation

== See also ==
- Steven White (disambiguation)
- Stephen White (disambiguation)
- Stephen Whyte (disambiguation)
- White (surname)
