= Bobby White =

Robert "Bobby" White, nicknamed Basketball Cop, is an American police officer with the Gainesville Police Department in Gainesville, Florida. White rose to fame in 2016 when a dashboard camera video of him responding to a complaint about loud teenagers culminated with him playing basketball with them went viral, drawing the attention of several national media outlets.

== Biography ==
White joined the Gainesville Police Department as a patrol officer in 2008. In 2012 he was named Officer of the Month for an undercover drug investigation.

== Viral video ==
On January 15, 2016, at about 5:00 p.m., the Gainesville Police Department received a call because a group of teenagers were playing basketball too loudly in an inner-city neighborhood. White was dispatched to take care of the issue, but instead of asking them to leave, he joined them for a pick-up game. White said to one of the teenagers, "Can you believe someone is calling to complain about kids playing basketball in the street?...Obviously I don't have any problem with it." Later on, a few more teenagers joined the game and White said that they brought "backup." He also lowered the rim and made a slam dunk. He said that he would return the next day to play with the kids again.

White's actions were filmed through a dashcam by the Gainesville Police Department, and they later posted the video to Facebook, with the hashtag #HoopsNotCrime. Ben Tobias, the police department's social media manager, said, "Things like this could have been handled so differently. How [Officer White] handled it really put a human aspect to it." As of March 9, 2016, the video has recorded over 17.3 million views on Facebook.

=== Aftermath ===
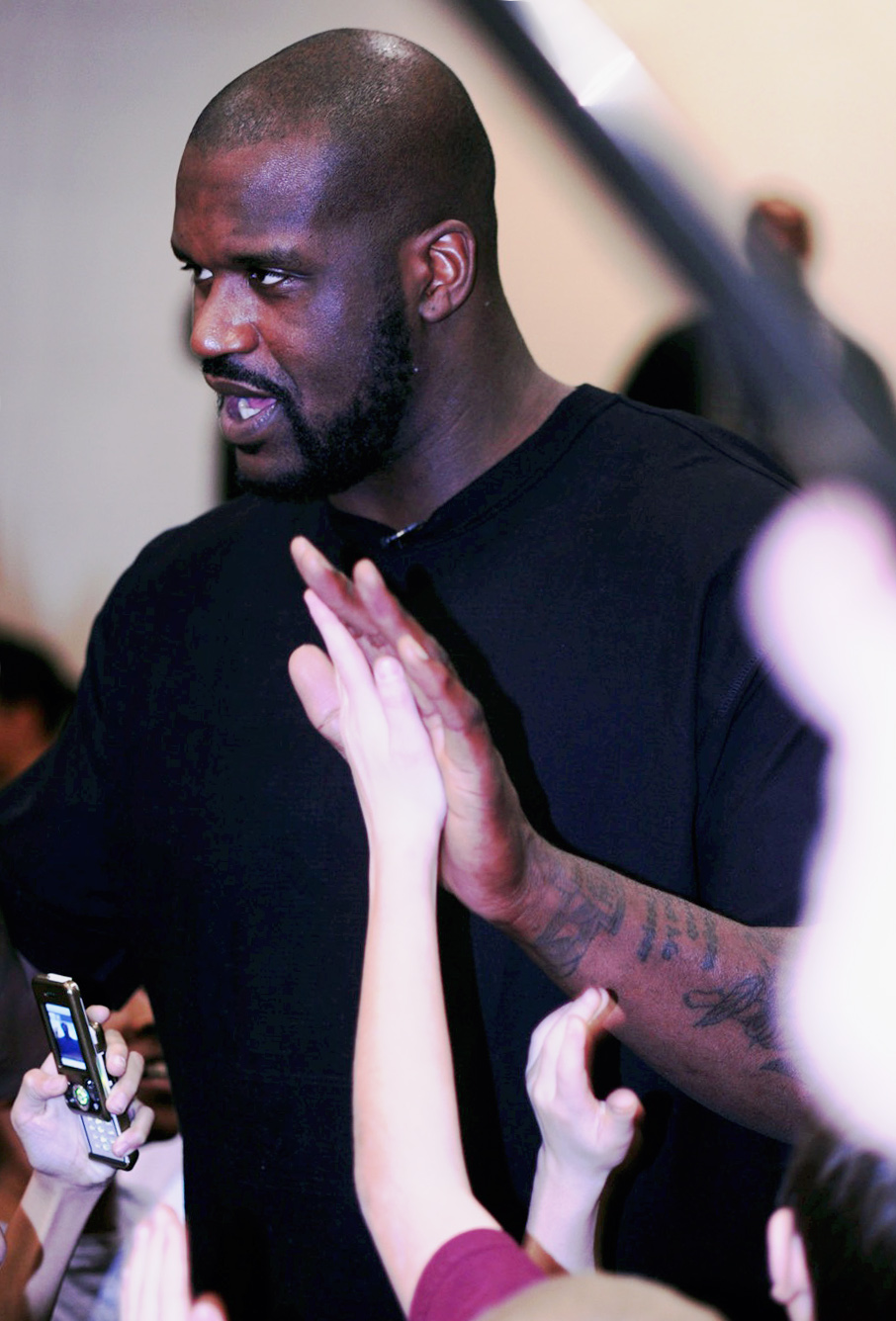
Shaquille O'Neal visited White and the group of boys after watching the video.

The video soon caught the attention of former NBA star Shaquille O'Neal, who trained to become a reserve police officer for the Los Angeles Port Police and the Miami Beach police force. He contacted the Gainesville Police Department, and once White returned to play with the boys, he brought O'Neal with him. White told them, "I brought some other backup for y'all". O'Neal offered the teenagers $100 for making a free throw, and he gave away $800 in total. After playing with them, O'Neal said, "Stay out of trouble, listen to your parents, respect your elders, and you can be anything you want to be" The GPD released a six-minute video, titled "The Rematch", which received over one million views. On February 7, 2016, several members of the police department, including White, and the teenagers he played with and their families, were invited to a game by the Orlando Magic of the NBA. The Magic brought them to the game by a bus and provided them with courtside seats for warm-ups. They met Magic players Elfrid Payton and Victor Oladipo as well as former players Dominique Wilkins, Nick Johnson, and Bo Outlaw. White was named "Harris Hometown Hero" and the GPD received a $1,000 donation for their youth programs.

White was prompted to create the "Basketball Cop Foundation" to build basketball courts in local areas that did not have one. On February 23, 2016, the GPD started a GoFundMe page to donate for their cause. White raised $81,140 in donations, with his goal being $25,000, before the campaign was closed in 2020
