= Steven White =

Steven White may refer to:

- Steven A. White (1928-2021), United States admiral
- Steven Edward White, Abolitionist Party of Canada candidate
- Steven R. White (born 1959), American professor of physics at the University of California, Irvine
- Steven V. White (1928–1988), American businessman

== See also ==
- Steve White (disambiguation)
- Stephen White (disambiguation)
- Stephen Whyte (disambiguation)
