= Keith White =

Keith White may refer to:

- Keith White (yachtsman) (1940s–2019), disabled British solo yachtsman
- Keith White (footballer) (born 1934), Australian rules footballer
- Keith White (politician), Canadian politician
- Keith White (speedway rider) (born 1958), former international speedway rider in the United Kingdom
