= Curtis White =

Curtis White may refer to:

- Curtis White (author) (active from 1981), American essayist and author
- Curtis White (cyclist) (born 1995), American cyclist
- "Curtis White" (1932–2012), pseudonym for a gay man used in a 1954 television interview
- Curt White (born 1962), American weightlifter
