= Colin White =

Colin White may refer to:

- Colin White (cricketer) (1937–2012), English cricketer
- Colin White (historian) (1951–2008), British naval historian
- Colin White (ice hockey, born 1977), Canadian ice hockey defenceman
- Colin White (ice hockey, born 1997), American ice hockey center
- Colin White (racing driver) (born 1956), British racing driver
- Colin White (rugby union) (1947–2011), English rugby union player
