= Stephen Whyte =

Stephen Whyte or Steven Whyte may refer to:

- Stephen Whyte, High Sheriff of Limerick City
- Steven Whyte, sculptor
- Steve Whyte, Australian professional footballer

== See also ==
- Stephen White (disambiguation)
- Steven White (disambiguation)
- Steve White (disambiguation)
