= Darren White =

Darren White may refer to:

- Darren White (politician), Sheriff of Bernalillo County, New Mexico and 2008 U.S. House candidate in New Mexico's 1st District
- Darren "Daz" White (born 1972), British musician
- Darren White, known as dBridge, British drum and bass musician
