= Lawrence White =

Lawrence or Larry White may refer to:

- Lawrence Grant White (1887–1956), American architect and critic
- Lawrence H. White (born 1954), economist
- Lawrence J. White (born c. 1943), economist
- Lawrence Kermit White (1912–2006), CIA officer
- 40 Glocc (born 1969), stage name of American rapper called Lawrence White
- Larry White (baseball) (born 1958), baseball player
- Larry Lamont White (born 1958), American serial killer

== Characters ==
- Lawrence White (Emmerdale), a character in the soap opera Emmerdale
