= Mitchell White =

Mitchell White or Mitch White may refer to:

- Mitch White (baseball) (born 1994), American baseball player
- Mitch White (footballer, born 1996), former Australian rules footballer
- Mitchell White (footballer, born 1973), former Australian rules footballer
- Mitchell White (gridiron football) (born 1990), American gridiron football player
