= Ed White (Australian rules footballer) =

Australian rules footballer

Personal information
- Full name: Edward White
- Nickname: Titch
- Born: 10 April 1922
- Died: 4 April 2012 (aged 89); St Vincent's Hospital, Melbourne
- Original team: Fitzroy Sub-Districts
- Height: 165 cm (5 ft 5 in)
- Weight: 65 kg (143 lb)

Playing career^{1}
Years	Club	Games (Goals)
1945	Fitzroy	1 (0)
- ^{1} Playing statistics correct to the end of 1945.

Edward White (10 April 1922 – 4 April 2012) was an Australian rules footballer who played with Fitzroy in the Victorian Football League (VFL).
