= Adam White (minister) =

Scottish Presbyterian minister

- Born: c. 1630; Murthogall, Lanarkshire, Scotland
- Died: 19 December 1708; Bushmills, Northern Ireland, United Kingdom
- Occupation: Presbyterian minister

Adam White (c. 1630 – 19 December 1708) was a Scottish Presbyterian minister imprisoned for non-conformity in Northern Ireland in the 1660s before being pardoned by King Charles II.

== Biography ==
White was probably born in his family lands of Murthogall (or Murthergill) in Lesmahagow, Lanarkshire, Scotland about 1630. White entered the University of Glasgow in the fourth class of 1645 and graduated in 1648 with a Master of Arts degree. He is shown as ministering at Laggan Presbyterian Church in Fannet, Donegal, Ireland in 1654. From 1655 - 1661, Oliver Cromwell’s government endowed White with £80 per year for support. He was jailed by Robert Leslie the Bishop of Raphoe in 1664 in Lifford for non-conformity to the Church of Ireland. In 1670, Charles II issued him a pardon upon hearing that he had "formerly suffered for his cause.” He returned to Fannet before taking up ministering again at Ardstraw, Tyrone, Ireland in 1672. In 1688 he fled to Scotland, perhaps due to events related to the Glorious Revolution. In 1692, he returned to Northern Ireland and became minister at Dunluce Church in Bushmills. He remained until his death on 19 December 1708 and was buried in the churchyard.

== Excommunication, Imprisonment, and Appeal to Charles II ==
In 1664, White and three other ministers, John Hart of Monreagh, William Semple of Letterkenny, and Thomas Drummond of Ramelton, were summoned to appear before the Bishop of Raphoe's court to answer for their non-conformity. When they failed to appear, Bishop Leslie passed a sentence of excommunication against them and issued a Writ De Excommunicato Capiendo Act 1562. They were apprehended and imprisoned in Lifford jail without bail. After a time the sheriff allowed them to move to a house in the town of Lifford where they were able to have guests, but they were still deprived of their freedom. They took various steps to secure their release, first contacting Thomas Butler, 6th Earl of Ossory who was the Deputy of Ireland and the son of the Duke of Ormond. When this failed, they procured a habeas corpus to have their matter decided at the King's Bench, but found no relief. They requested to be heard by the Court of the Chancery, however, the Archbishop of Dublin ordered their re-imprisonment in the jail at Lifford. Finally, they sent a petition to Charles II who upon hearing that they had previously suffered for his cause and that their only crime was not appearing before the Bishop of Raphoe, wrote to the Lord Lieutenant of Ireland in October 1670 and ordered their immediate release.

== Children ==
Though the name of his wife is not known, Adam White is believed to have had at least three sons: George, Hugh, and Moses. George received a grant of land from his father in 1699 and is believed to have stayed in Scotland. Hugh was a Jacobite and took part in the Rising of 1715. He was captured at the Battle of Preston in Lancashire, England and transported to the American Colonies in 1716 as punishment for treason and levying war on the king. Moses went to America in 1722 with the wives and children of both brothers to reunite the families in Pennsylvania.

== Descendants ==
Though he never came to the New World, White is the ancestor of several prominent United States politicians and leaders. Some of these include:

Hugh Lawson White, U.S. Senator; General James White, founder of Knoxville, Tennessee; Edward Douglass White Jr., United States Senator and the ninth Chief Justice of the United States; Edward Douglass White Sr., Governor of Louisiana; Stephen Decatur Miller, Governor of South Carolina; and Joseph Lanier Williams, United States Congressman from Tennessee. He is also ancestor to Tennessee Williams and David White and William White founders of the White Furniture Company.
