= Steven V. White =

American chairman

- Born: October 3, 1928; Loma Linda, California, US
- Died: December 16, 1988 (aged 60); Berkeley, California, US
- Education: University of California, Berkeley
- Spouse: Georgia Alberta Thomas

Steven Virgil White was born October 3, 1928, in Loma Linda, California. He died December 16, 1988.

White graduated from the University of California at Berkeley in 1951. He spent six years with the Atomic Energy Commission in Washington, D.C., and Hinsdale, Illinois. in 1961, White began working with the Bechtel Corporation as the contracts manager in the legal department. He was elevated to vice-president in 1971, senior vice-president in 1973. From 1980 until his death, he was president of Bechtel Investments.

When he died, White was president of the Oakland Stake of the Church of Jesus Christ of Latter-day Saints, a position he had held less than three months. He had previously served in a counselor to the previous president, as well as a bishop and in other capacities.

White served as a director of the Merritt-Peralta Medical Center, chairman of radio station KOIT's advisory board, chairman of the National Advisory Council of Brigham Young University's School of Management, and the advisory board of the Utah Symphony.

He was a member of the Pacific-Union Club.

In 1986 he was named Alumnus of the Year of Berkeley's business school.
