= Stephen A. White =

American philosopher

Education
- Education: University of Illinois, Urbana (BA, MA); University of California, Berkeley (PhD)

Philosophical work
- Era: Contemporary philosophy
- Region: Western philosophy
- School: Analytic philosophy
- Institutions: University of Texas at Austin
- Main interests: Ethics

Stephen A. White is an American philosopher and Professor of Classics and Philosophy at the University of Texas at Austin. He is known for his work on ancient Greek philosophy.

== Books ==
- Diogenes Laertius: Lives of Eminent Philosophers, translation with introduction and notes, Cambridge University Press 2021
- Sovereign Virtue: Aristotle on the Relation Between Prosperity and Happiness, Stanford University Press 1992
