= Todd White =

Todd White may refer to:

- Todd White (American football) in 1988 Philadelphia Eagles season
- Todd White (artist) (born 1969), American figurative expressionist painter
- Todd White (golfer), American golfer in 2013 Walker Cup
- Todd White (ice hockey) (born 1975), Canadian ice hockey player
- Todd White (pastor), founder of Lifestyle Christianity Church
