= Horace White (disambiguation) =

Horace White (1865–1943) was an American lawyer and politician from New York

Horace White may also refer to:

- Horace White (writer) (1834–1916), American journalist and financial writer
- Horace Alton White (1907-1958), American politician from Michigan
- Horace Henry White (1864–1946), American lawyer and civic leader from Louisiana
