= Gainesville Police Department =

Police department for the city of Gainesville, Florida

Coordinates: 29.6592°N 82.3305°W

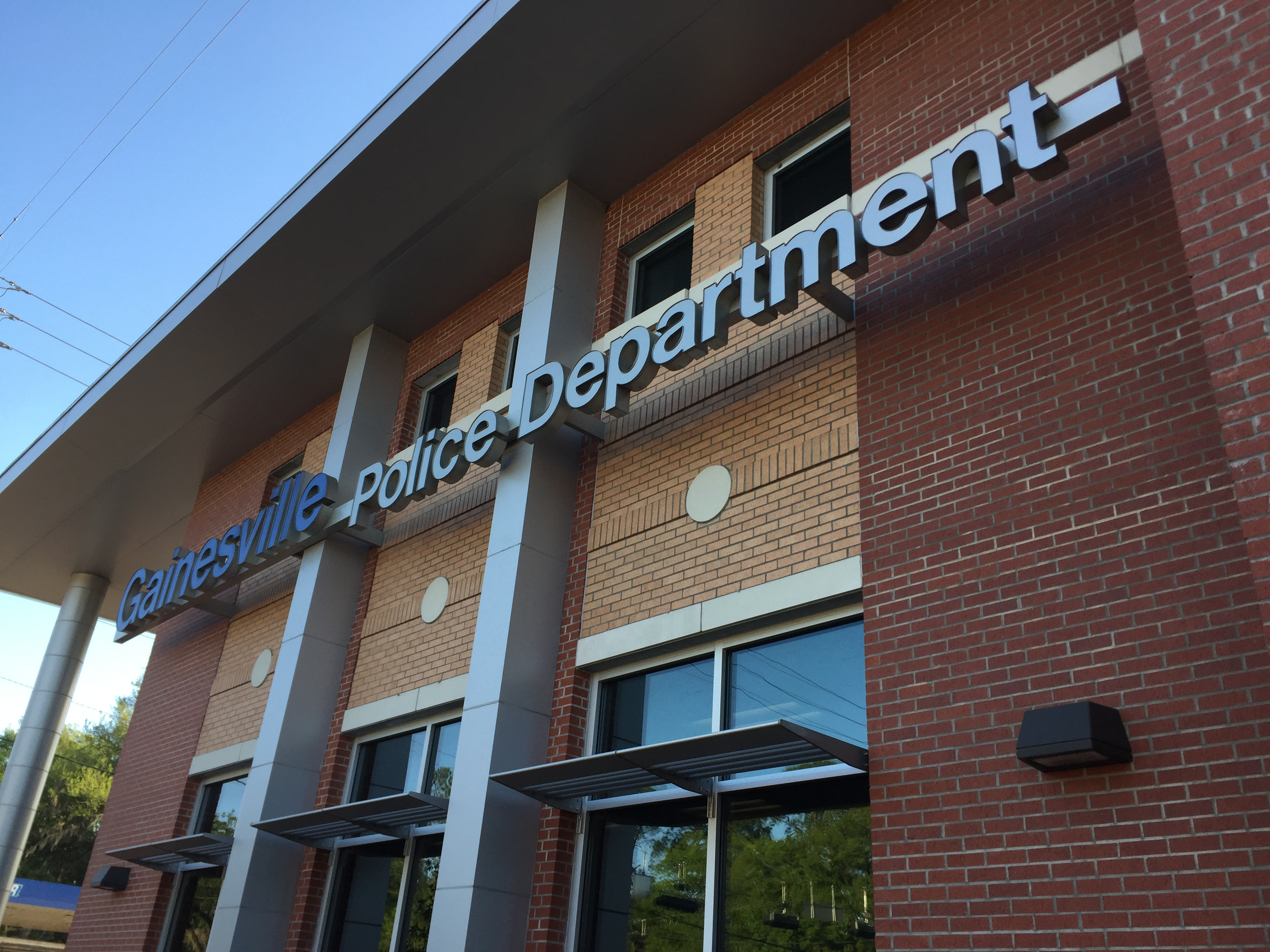
Gainesville Police Department headquarters, March 2018

The Gainesville Police Department is responsible for law enforcement within the city limits of Gainesville, Florida. This includes operations, investigations, crime prevention, victim outreach, community outreach, and youth outreach.

== History ==
The police department formed in the early 1900s. The department began purchasing cars in 1908. By 1922, the department consisted of three members, and over time the department kept growing.

In 2026, two law enforcement officers were shot.

== See also ==
- List of United States state and local law enforcement agencies
