= Eddie White (baseball) =

Professional baseball player

- Pitcher
- Batted: Left Threw: Left

Negro league baseball debut
- 1944, for the Homestead Grays

Last appearance
- 1944, for the Homestead Grays

Teams
- Homestead Grays (1944)

Lawrence Edward White was an American Negro league pitcher in the 1940s.

White played for the Homestead Grays during their 1944 Negro World Series championship season. In his only professional season, he made four appearances on the mound, and recorded two hits in 12 plate appearances over six games.
