= Joshua White =

Joshua White may refer to:

- Josh White (1914–1969), American musician and civil rights activist
- Josh White Jr., his son, American musician
- Joshua White (politician) (1812–1890), businessman and Illinois state legislator
- Joshua White (artist) (born 1942), visual musician of The Joshua Light Show
- Josh White (journalist), journalist at the Washington Post and elsewhere
- Josh White (American football) (born 1977), American football player
- Josh White (Christian musician) (born 1973), Christian musician and lead singer of the worship band Telecast
- Josh White (racing driver) (born 1991), American stock car driver and Marine
- Josh White (baseball) (born 2000), American professional baseball player
