= Robert White (antiquary) =

Scottish antiquarian and poet

- Born: 17 September 1802; Yetholm, Roxburghshire
- Died: 20 February 1874 (aged 71); Newcastle
- Occupations: Antiquarian and poet

Robert White (17 September 1802 – 20 February 1874) was a Scottish antiquarian and poet.

== Biography ==
White was the son of a border farmer, was born on 17 September 1802 at the Clock Mill, near the gipsy village of Yetholm in Roxburghshire. While he was a boy his father removed to Otterburn in Redesdale. There he herded his father's cattle, managing at the same time to acquire a knowledge of books, and filling his mind with border lore. His father's landlord, James Ellis, the friend and correspondent of Sir Walter Scott, encouraged him, and made him welcome in his library, where he spent the winter evenings, copying whole volumes of his patron's treasures. After spending a short time with a weaver in Jedburgh he returned to employment on the farm. In 1825 he found employment in Newcastle in the counting-house of Robert Watson, a plumber and brassfounder at the High Bridge. White remained with Watson until Watson died forty years later.

At Newcastle White found time and opportunity for study. By abstemious living he was able to devote part of his small income to the purchase of books, and in time he accumulated a library containing many rare and valuable volumes. His holidays were usually spent in rambles on the border with his friend James Telfer, the Saughtrees poet, steeping himself in border minstrelsy and gathering knowledge of border life. His first poem, ‘The Tynemouth Nun,’ was written in 1829, and at the suggestion of the antiquary, John Adamson, it was printed in the same year for the Typographical Society of Newcastle. After this successful essay, he devoted himself to the preservation and reproduction of local legend and song, contributing to many local publications. In 1853, he printed for distribution among his friends a poem on ‘The Wind’ (Newcastle, 8vo), and in 1856, also for private circulation, another poem entitled ‘England’ (Newcastle, 8vo). About this time, or a little earlier, he became a member of the Newcastle Society of Antiquaries, to which he contributed a paper on the battle of Neville's Cross (Arch. Æliana, new ser. i. 271–303). Encouraged by its reception, he published a volume on the ‘History of the Battle of Otterburn’ (London, 1857, 8vo), adding memoirs of the warriors engaged. This was followed in 1858 by a paper read to the Newcastle Society on the battle of Flodden (ib. iii. 197–236), and in 1871 by a ‘History of the Battle of Bannockburn’ (London, 8vo). These monographs were rendered valuable by White's intimate acquaintance with local legend, and by his topographical knowledge, which enabled him to elucidate much that hitherto had remained obscure. He died unmarried at his house in Claremont Place, Newcastle, on 20 February 1874.

White was also the author, apart from other antiquarian papers, of ‘Going Home,’ a poem [1850?], 8vo; ‘A Few Lyrics,’ Edinburgh, 1857, 8vo, reprinted from Charles Rogers's ‘Modern Scottish Minstrel,’ 1855 (for private circulation); and ‘Poems, including Tales, Ballads, and Songs,’ Kelso, 1867, 8vo (with a portrait). He edited the ‘Poems and Ballads of John Leyden,’ Kelso, 1858, 8vo, with a memoir supplementing that by Sir Walter Scott. Several of his songs are to be found in the ‘Whistle Binkie’ collection and in Alexander Whitelaw's ‘Book of Scottish Song’ (1844).
