= Warren White =

Warren White may refer to:

- Warren White (baseball) (1844–1890), American professional baseball player
- Warren White (oceanographer) (fl. 1970s–2020s), research oceanographer at the Scripps Institution of Oceanography

== See also ==
- Warren White, or the Great White Shark, fictional villain in Batman comics
