= Gillian White (lawyer) =

English lawyer (1936–2016)

Gillian Mary White (1936–2016, married name Fraser) was an English lawyer and professor of law. She was professor of international law at the University of Manchester from 1975 until her retirement in 1991. She was the first English woman to be appointed as a professor of law in the United Kingdom, and the first woman to hold such a post in mainland Britain (South African Claire Palley having been appointed professor of law at Queen's University Belfast in 1970).

== Selected publications ==
- White, Gillian M. (1965). The use of experts by international tribunals. Syracuse UP. OCLC 837926581.
- White, Gillian M. (1982). Submissions to public hearings. A.G.P.S. OCLC 501269757.
- White, Gillian M. (1988). International economic law and developing states : some aspects. London: British Institute of International and Comparative Law. ISBN 9780903067294.
