= Edward Higgins White Sr. =

United States Air Force general (1901–1978)

Edward Higgins White
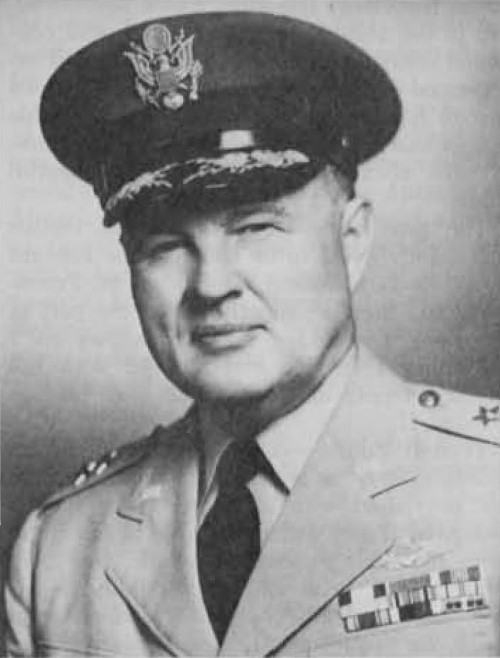
- Born: May 22, 1901; Fort Wayne, Indiana, US
- Died: November 7, 1978 (aged 77); St. Petersburg, Florida, US
- Burial place: West Point Cemetery
- Military career
- Branch: United States Army; United States Air Force
- Service years: 1924–1957
- Rank: Major General
- Service number: AO-238
- Commands: 3750th Technical Training Wing; 1503rd Air Transport Wing
- Conflicts: World War II; Korean War
- Awards: Army Distinguished Service Medal; Legion of Merit (2); Army Commendation Ribbon

Edward Higgins White (May 22, 1901 – November 7, 1978) was a United States Air Force general who served in the United States Army Air Forces Budget Office during World War II and commanded the 1503rd Air Transport Wing in the Korean War.

A graduate of the United States Military Academy at West Point class of 1924, he was commissioned in the Army Air Corps and learned to fly both airships and airplanes. He attended Harvard Business School, from which he received his Master of Business Administration in 1937, and spent World War II working as a budget and financial officer, first at the Air Materiel Command at Wright Field, Ohio, and then in the Office of the Chief of United States Army Air Forces in Washington, D.C. He transferred to the United States Air Force when it was created in 1947.

After service in the Korean War he became chief of the Army and Air Force Exchange Service in New York City. He then served as commander of the 3750th Technical Training Wing at Sheppard Air Force Base, Texas, until he retired in 1957 with the rank of major general.

== Early life and career ==
Edward Higgins White was born in Fort Wayne, Indiana, on May 22, 1901, the second of three sons of Alexander and Cecilia Higgins White. He had an older brother, James Cecillus White, who attended the United States Military Academy at West Point but failed to graduate with the class of 1919. James was commissioned as a second lieutenant in the infantry and eventually retired as a colonel in 1953. His younger brother, John Alexander White, attended the United States Naval Academy at Annapolis and was commissioned as a second lieutenant in the United States Marine Corps. A guard at the Embassy of the United States, Beijing, when the Pacific War broke out on December 8, 1941, he spent four years in captivity, but eventually retired with the rank of colonel.

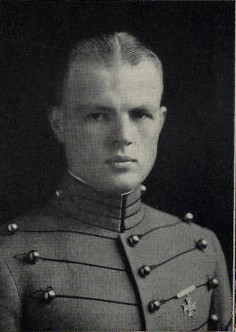
At West Point in 1924

Appointed from Indiana, Edward White followed his older brother to West Point, which he entered on July 1, 1920. He graduated 270th out of 405 in the class of 1924 on June 12, 1924, and was commissioned as a second lieutenant in the United States Army Air Corps. He attended the Air Corps Primary Flying School at Brooks Field, Texas, the Air Corps Advanced Flying School at Kelly Field, Texas, and finally the Air Corps Balloon and Airship School at Scott Field, Illinois, from which he graduated as a Balloon Observer and Airship Pilot on July 20, 1926. He married Mary Haller, a girl from Fort Wayne, on July 22, 1925. They had three children: a daughter, Jeanne, born in 1927, and sons Edward Higgins White II, born in 1930, and James Blair White, born in 1942.

In 1927, White became the first man to land a dirigible on water, in order to rescue a fellow balloonist. After duty at Scott Field as a flying instructor until July 1, 1929, he attended the Air Corps Primary Flying School at Kelly Field, graduating on February 28, 1930, and then the Advanced Flying School there. He was promoted to first lieutenant on October 5, 1929, and on graduation on June 21, 1930, he was rated as an Airplane Pilot.

White remained at Kelly Field as assistant post adjutant of the Air Corps Training Center until June 12, 1931, when he was posted to the 6th Pursuit Squadron at Wheeler Field, Hawaii, becoming its commander on September 12, 1931, and was adjutant of the 18th Pursuit Group as well until June 10, 1933. He returned to the United States in August 1933, and entered the Army Industrial College. He graduated on June 12, 1934, and was sent to Chicago as a procurement planning representative. He was promoted to captain on August 1, 1935, and then entered Harvard Business School, from which he received his Master of Business Administration degree on June 8, 1937. He was then posted to the headquarters of the Air Materiel Command at Wright Field, Ohio, as Assistant Budget Officer.

== World War II ==
In October 1939, White was transferred to the Office of the Chief of the Air Corps in Washington, D.C., to work in the Budget Office. He was promoted to major on March 11, 1940. He attended the Air Corps Tactical School at Maxwell Field, Alabama, and then returned to Wright Field as Budget Officer. He was promoted to lieutenant colonel on November 5, 1941, and colonel on March 12, 1943.

White returned to Washington, D.C., in August 1944 as Assistant Budget and Fiscal Officer in the Office of the Chief of United States Army Air Forces. For his services he was awarded the Legion of Merit, and the Army Commendation Ribbon.

== Cold War ==
On October 1, 1947, White transferred to the United States Air Force, with the rank of brigadier general. He served as deputy air comptroller from November 7, 1947, to February 2, 1948, then as director of the budget from until December 31, 1948, and as assistant comptroller until July 20, 1949.

White commanded the 1503rd Air Transport Wing in Japan until July 1951, which shipped supplies and personnel to the forces fighting in the Korean War. For his services he was awarded the Army Distinguished Service Medal.

On returning to the United States in July 1951, he became chief of the Army and Air Force Exchange Service in New York City. He then became commander of the 3750th Technical Training Wing at Sheppard Air Force Base, Texas, on September 1, 1954. He retired from the Air Force as a major general on July 31, 1957. For his services he was awarded a second Legion of Merit.

== Later life ==
White's son Lt. Colonel Edward Higgins White II graduated from West Point with the class of 1952, and later became an astronaut, and the first American to "walk" in space. He was killed in the Apollo 1 fire in 1967. White's second son, Major James Blair White, was a graduate of the United States Air Force Academy. He was killed when his F-105 Thunderchief crashed in Laos in 1969.

White died on November 7, 1978, at his home in St. Petersburg, Florida, and was buried in West Point Cemetery.
