= Hugh White =

Hugh White is the name of:

- Hugh White, British soldier involved in the Boston Massacre
- Hugh L. White (1881–1965), Governor of Mississippi
- Hugh Lawson White (1773–1840), U.S. Senator from Tennessee
- Hugh White (New York politician) (1798–1870), U.S. Representative from New York
  - Hugh White (judge) (1733–1812), grandfather of Hugh White and founder and namesake of Whitestown, New York
- Hugh Edward White (1869–1939), architect in North Carolina
- Hugh White (American football) (1876–1936), American football player and CEO of George A Fuller Company
- Hugh White State Park, Mississippi, named after Hugh L. White
- Hugh White (RAF officer) (1898–1983), World War I flying ace
- Hugh White (strategist) (born 1953), Australian defence strategist
