= Doug White =

Doug White may refer to:

- Doug White (baseball), American baseball coach
- Doug White (news anchor) (1944–2006), American news anchor
- Doug White (politician), American politician in the Ohio House of Representatives (1991–1996) and Senate (1996–2004)
- Doug White (aviator), subject of the 2023 film On a Wing and a Prayer starring Dennis Quaid

== See also ==
- Douglas White (disambiguation)
