= Curt White =

American weightlifter (born 1962)

Personal information
- Nationality: American
- Born: 1962

Sport
- Country: United States
- Sport: Olympic weightlifting

Achievements and titles
- Olympic finals: 1988 Summer Olympics

Curt White (born 1962) is a former Olympic weightlifter for the United States in the 1988 Summer Olympics. He is a chiropractor in Mooresville, North Carolina.

== Education ==
He obtained his degree from Eastern Illinois University in Charleston, Illinois and also graduated from Logan College of Chiropractic in St. Louis, Missouri in 1988.

== Olympics ==
White was a member of the 1988 Olympic weightlifting team and participated in Olympic weightlifting for over 20 years. Throughout his time as an Olympic weightlifter, he held and still holds several national records. White was inducted into the US Olympic Weightlifting Hall of Fame in 1998.

== Weightlifting achievements ==
- Olympic Games team member (1988)
- Senior national champion (1977, 1982, 1983, 1985, 1986, and 1988)
- All-time senior American record holder in clean and jerk and total
- All-time junior American record holder in snatch, clean and jerk, and total
- Youngest senior national champion age 14, 114 lbs. class*
