= Molly White (disambiguation) =

Molly White (born 1993) is an American software engineer, Wikipedia editor, and cryptocurrency critic.

Molly White may also refer to:

- Molly White (politician) (born 1958), American politician in the Texas House of Representatives
- Molly White, fictional character in the 1928 American drama film The Hound of Silver Creek
- Molly White, fictional character in the 2000 TV movie Trapped in a Purple Haze
