= Robert White (serial killer) =

American serial killer (born 1960)

- Born: Robert Jimmy White Jr. August 9, 1960 (age 66); Hartford, Connecticut, U.S.
- Convictions: Manslaughter (1980); Murder (2014); Murder (2 counts) (2018)
- Penalty: 10-years to 20-years (1980); 50-years (2014); 50-years (2018)

Details
- Victims: 4
- Span of crimes: 1980–2013
- Country: United States
- State: Connecticut
- Date apprehended: March 18, 2013

Robert Jimmy White Jr. (born August 9, 1960) is an American serial killer who beat three women to death in Hartford, Connecticut, between 1997 and 2013, all while out on parole for a 1980 manslaughter conviction. After his arrest, he confessed when confronted with DNA evidence and received two 50-year sentences.

== Crimes ==
=== Death of Betty Robertson ===
On the afternoon of April 23, 1980, White, then 19 years old, walked into a bar on Albany Avenue looking for a woman to rape. That was when he noticed 46-year-old Betty Jo Robertson sitting alone and he began talking to her. He persuaded Robertson to let him walk her home, and after they both left, White pulled Robertson into a secluded location and attempted to assault her. Her attempts to resist White led to him biting, scratching, and grabbing her until he threw her to ground, smashing her head into the concrete sidewalk. White fled and witnesses who saw the attack phoned authorities, who rushed Robertson to the hospital. She died from her injures the next day.

Investigators, who were aided by witnesses and a cap that was found at the crime scene, detained White on suspicion of murder in late June. He confessed to the crime, stating he was only trying to rape Robertson and did not mean to kill her. His defense was able to persuade a judge to lower White's indictment of felony murder to first-degree manslaughter due to him being under the influence of alcohol at the time of the murder. On November 24, White pled guilty to the charge and was sentenced to 10 to 20 years in prison. At his sentencing, he said, "I have no explanation for my actions".

=== Serial murders ===
After serving 8½ years of his sentence, White was paroled in July 1989. His activities between 1989 and 1996 are unknown, but on August 10, 1997, he met 30-year-old prostitute Shiraleen Crawford on Martin Street. The two went to Crawford's apartment and engaged in sex and drinking for roughly two hours before White brandished a knife and slit Crawford's throat, proceeding to stab her numerous times before the blade broke. Afterwards, he grabbed a nearby hammer and beat her to death, proceeding to remove her clothes and have sex with her body before leaving. Her decomposing body was found five days later by a visiting friend. The following year, White was found guilty of first-degree sexual assault in an unrelated case and was sentenced to fourteen years in prison. He was released in 2011.

After his release, White befriended and began dating 60-year-old Sawarie Krichindath, and the two eventually moved in together since he could not afford a home for himself. On September 27, 2012, White stalked out an alleyway and attacked 48-year-old Sonia Rivera, a mother of five. He raped and beat her unconscious, leaving her for dead, although she lived long enough to be treated at the hospital before succumbing to her injuries five days later.

In February 2013, White and Krichindath had an argument which escalated when White began choking and stabbing her in the neck, killing her. Afterwards he stole her apartment key card and used it to access secure areas of the building. White was arrested on March 18 and confessed to killing Krichindath. The following year, he was sentenced to 50 years in prison, the maximum sentence the judge could give, who argued that White was a danger to society.

== Exposure ==
After his sentence, White was required to submit his DNA into the state database. In April 2016, his DNA was matched to forensic evidence left at the murder of Crawford. Afterwards, detectives interviewed White, who initially denied knowing Crawford, but when pressed about the evidence, he confessed to killing her. After confessing to Crawford's murder, police questioned White about any other crimes he committed, and he subsequently confessed to killing Sonia Rivera. By this time, her murder had been incorrectly attributed to a man named Denzil Nurse, who was arrested in 2014 and was awaiting trial until DNA ruled him out as a suspect. In 2018, White entered an alford plea for these crimes and was sentenced to another 50 years in prison.

== See also ==
- List of serial killers in the United States
