= Colin White (cricketer) =

English cricketer

Personal information
- Full name: Colin Derek White
- Born: 4 April 1937; Chiswick, Middlesex, England
- Died: 27 February 2012 (aged 74); Epsom, Surrey, England
- Batting: Left-handed
- Bowling: Slow left-arm wrist-spin

Domestic team information
- Years: Team
- 1958–1960: Cambridge University

Career statistics
Competition	First-class
Matches	23
Runs scored	606
Batting average	15.53
100s/50s	0/2
Top score	17
Balls bowled	0
Wickets	–
Bowling average	–
5 wickets in innings	–
10 wickets in match	–
Best bowling	–
Catches/stumpings	7/–
- Source: Cricinfo, 10 October 2018

Colin Derek White (4 April 1937 – 27 February 2012) was an English first-class cricketer.

Born at Chiswick in April 1937, White later attended Cranleigh School, where he played for the school cricket team. After leaving Cranleigh, he went up to the University of Cambridge. It was there that he made his debut in first-class cricket for Cambridge University Cricket Club against Surrey at Fenner's in 1958. In his sixth match of 1958 against the touring New Zealanders, White was hit in the mouth by a delivery from Bob Blair. However, two weeks later he was back playing, making a further nine first-class appearances in 1958. Thereafter, he only appeared sporadically in 1958 and 1959, making seven further appearances. White made a total of 22 first-class appearances for the university, scoring a total of 549 runs at an average of just 14.83. His highest score of 64, one of two half centuries he made, came against Nottinghamshire in 1960. He made a final appearance in first-class cricket for the Free Foresters in 1961. After graduating from Cambridge, he became a banker. White died at Epsom in February 2012.
