= Keith White (yachtsman) =

British yachtsman (died 2019)

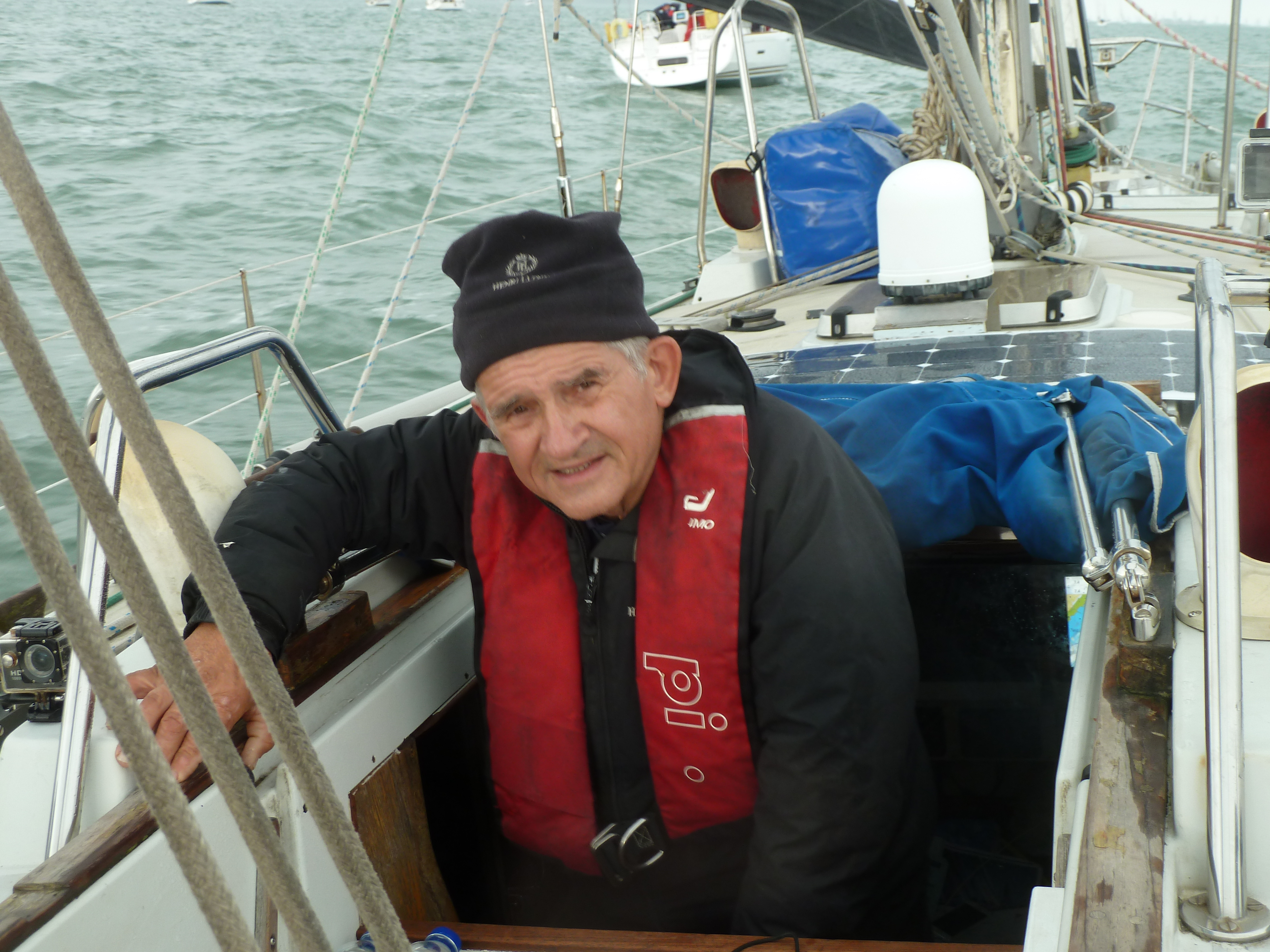
- White, in July 2017 aboard Marathon
- Born: 1948 or 1949
- Died: January 17, 2019 (age 70)
- Occupation: Yachtsman
- Known for: Disabled solo yachtsman; First solo disabled circumnavigation of UK and Ireland; First solo disabled Atlantic Ocean crossing, and return; Disabled global circumnavigation attempt (current); Charity fundraiser

Keith White was a British yachtsman. In October 2015 he set out on a non-stop solo circumnavigation of the world in his yacht, the Marathon, in part to raise funds for charity. White, who was disabled, lost the use of his left arm in 1991 due to a road traffic accident. A sailor since he was 16 years old, he achieved some significant firsts with his circumnavigation of the UK and Ireland, and his circuit of the Atlantic.

== Yachting achievements ==
=== Circumnavigation of UK and Ireland ===
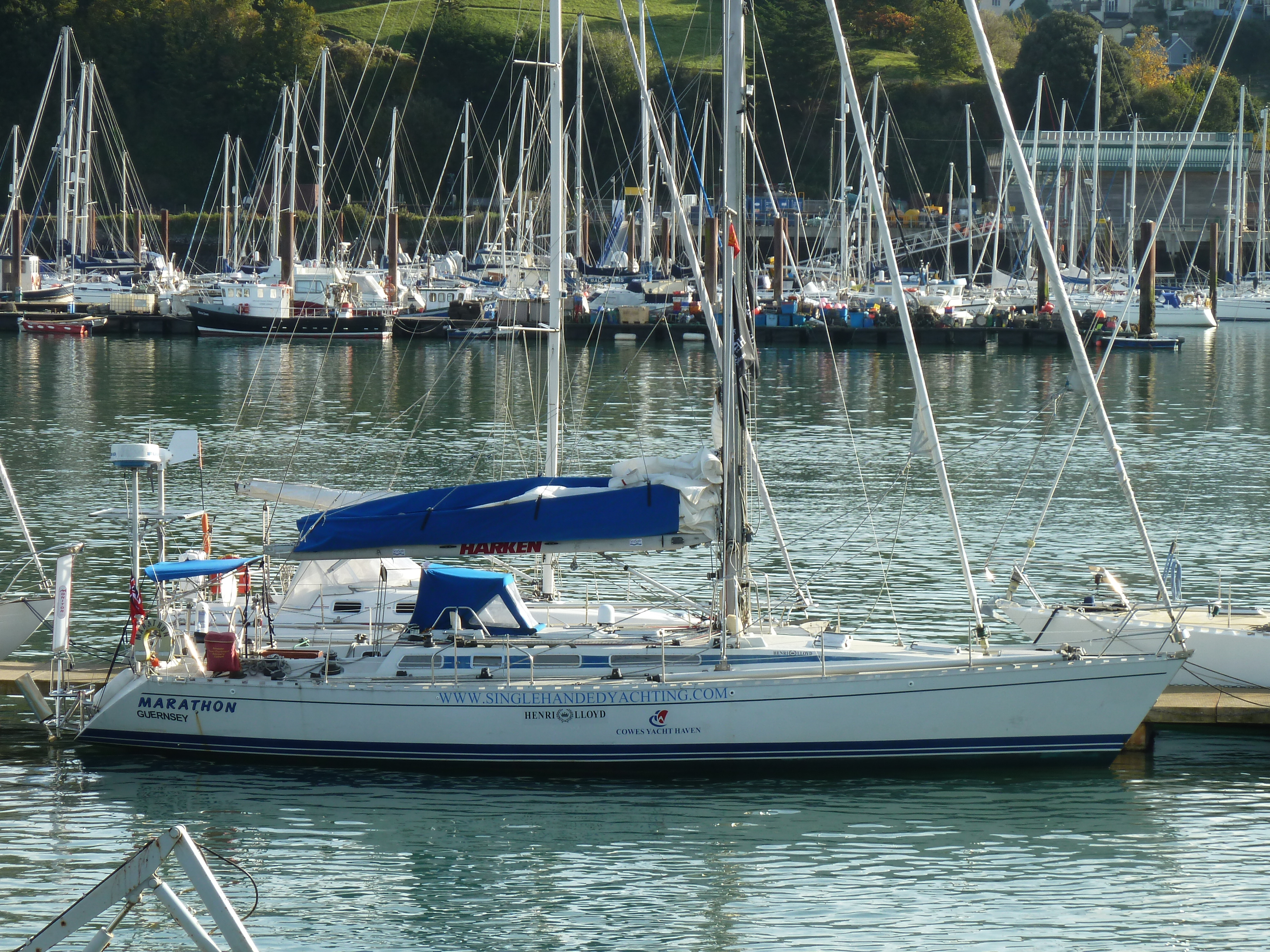
The Marathon, moored on the DC pontoon in Dartmouth, Devon, in the afternoon of 24 October 2015, prior to White's departure for his solo circumnavigation

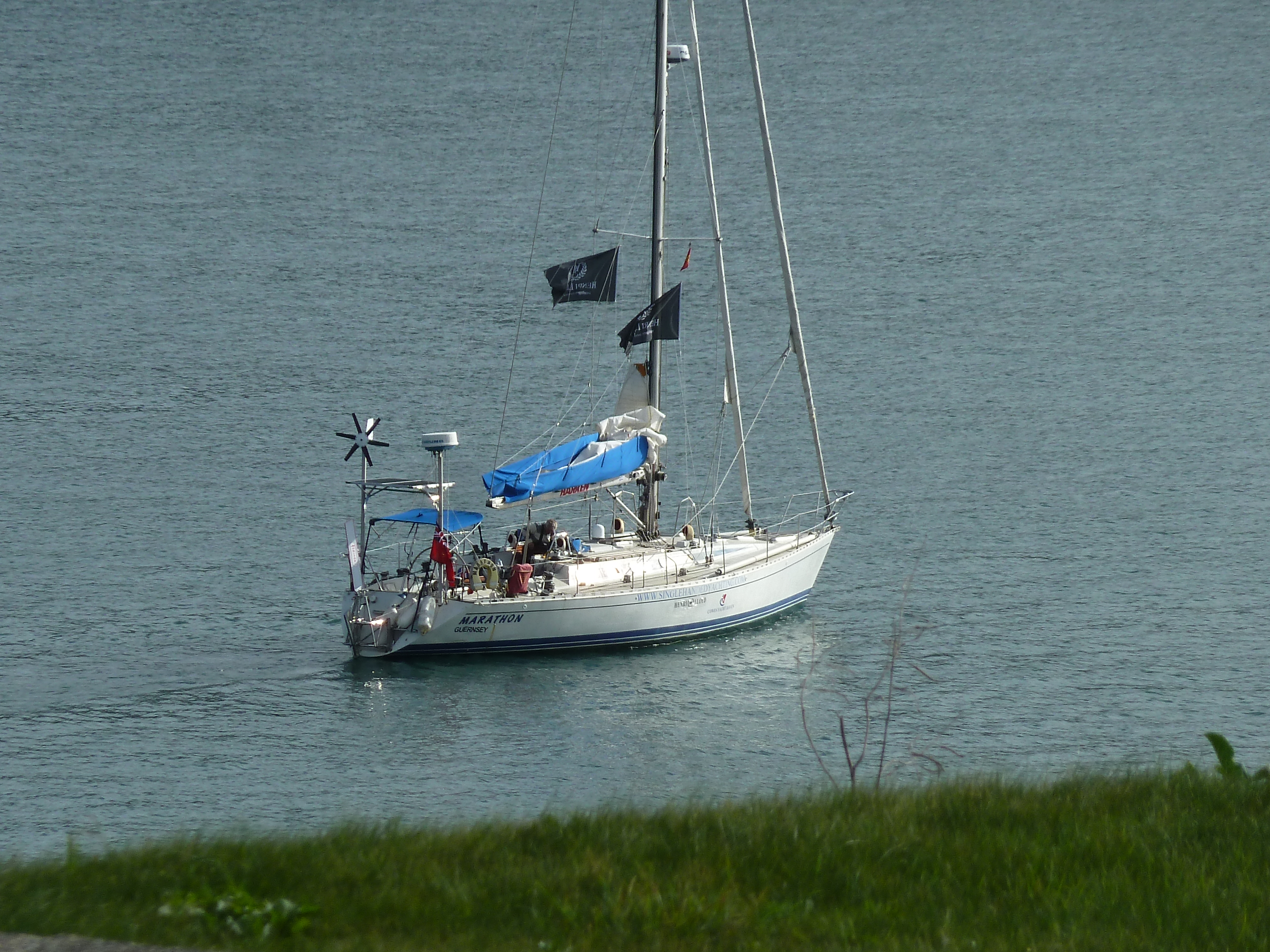
The Marathon leaving port in Dartmouth on 25 October 2015, with no fanfare, no fleet of spectator boats, motoring past Dartmouth Castle and about to make sail and head for the start of the circumnavigation

In 2005, to celebrate the 200th anniversary of the Battle of Trafalgar, White circumnavigated Great Britain and Ireland solo, travelling anticlockwise, against the prevailing winds. His boat, the Nephele, a Beneteau First 325, encountered a severe storm 60 miles northwest of Arranmore and 40 miles from Tory Island, off the coast of Ireland, and was overwhelmed but remained afloat.

The voyage started on 5 June 2005, from Gillingham, and the severe storm, force 11 on the Beaufort scale, caught him on 3 July 2005. His mayday call was relayed to the Malin Coastguard, and the rescue operation lasted 24 hours. After rescue and treatment of injuries received, White completed the circumnavigation on 22 July 2005.

Guinness Book of World Records has declined to list White's feat, calling it too complex to stand as a record.

=== Transatlantic voyage ===
With a new boat, the Rosiley, a Hanse 400, White completed a successful solo circuit from the UK to the US and back in 2007 and 2008. The route took him from the UK via the Canary Islands, Florida, New York City, and Boston, and then back across the Atlantic to the UK. His yacht had no modifications for disability.

=== Solo global circumnavigation attempt ===
White planned a nonstop solo circumnavigation for charity. In 2015 he prepared for his charity solo circumnavigation of the world by entering his yacht, the Marathon, a one-off Feeling 1350 yacht, built for the 1991 BOC Challenge and veteran of two prior circumnavigations, in the Round the Island Race, with crew. The purpose of this was to seek to find and remove any pre-circumnavigation technical problems.

The solo circumnavigation attempt started in October 2015. Marathon departed from Cowes on 23 October 2015, pausing in Dartmouth, Devon, on 24 October before setting out to cross the notional circumnavigation start/finish line from Lizard lighthouse to Ushant. He left Dartmouth in the morning of 25 October 2015.

Though the voyage was planned to be a nonstop solo circumnavigation (which, with the use of one arm, might have qualified as an around the world sailing record), White's shore team announced on 29 October 2015 that catastrophic gear failure meant it was essential to head for port in northern Spain to undertake repairs. The voyage resumed on 8 November 2015 after a week of repairs in A Coruña. A further serious gear failure necessitated a stop for repairs at Las Palmas on Gran Canaria on 22 November 2015, leaving to resume the journey on 30 November 2015.

White's 2015 voyage was planned to raise money for two charities, Save the Children, and a foundation to build a sailing replica of the Cutty Sark, to be built on the Isle of Wight. The voyage was estimated to take about ten months.

On 23 December 2015 White's shore team announced the postponement of the challenge citing the unserviceability of both of his self-steering mechanisms. White had set course for the Caribbean to make things safe, and announced his intention to return to Cowes to raise additional funding, refit the Marathon, and try again.

=== Longest solo transatlantic attempt ===
Returning to the UK from the Cayman Islands, starting in April 2016, White set himself the challenge of the longest disabled solo transatlantic leg.

== Analogous historical feats ==
Other disabled sailors have been involved in solo circumnavigations. Charl DeVilliers was a deaf round-the-world sailor; Robert E. Case was deaf and circumnavigated; and Vinny Lauwers, is a paraplegic who won the 2001 Laureus Award in the disability category for sailing around the world solo, unassisted, and nonstop. Gerry Hughes, a profoundly deaf Scottish teacher, sailed single-handed round the world "past all five capes".
