= Edmund White (cricketer) =

English cricketer (1928–2004)

Personal information
- Born: 29 January 1928; Lee, London, England
- Died: 6 March 2004 (aged 76); Aylesbury, Buckinghamshire, England
- Batting: Right-handed
- Role: Wicket-keeper

Domestic team information
- Years: Team
- 1946–1948: Northamptonshire

Career statistics
Competition	First-class
Matches	3
Runs scored	44
Batting average	11.00
100s/50s	–/–
Top score	16
Balls bowled	–
Wickets	–
Bowling average	–
5 wickets in innings	–
10 wickets in match	–
Best bowling	–
Catches/stumpings	1/–
- Source: Cricinfo, 16 November 2011

Edmund White (29 January 1928 – 6 March 2004) was an English cricketer. White was a right-handed batsman who fielded as a wicket-keeper. He was born at Lee, London.

White made his first-class debut for Northamptonshire against Glamorgan in the 1946 County Championship. He made a further first-class appearance in 1947 against the Combined Services, before making a final appearance against Essex in the 1948 County Championship. In his three first-class matches, he scored 44 runs at an average of 11.00, with a high score of 16.

He died at Stoke Mandeville Hospital, in Aylesbury, Buckinghamshire on 6 March 2004.
