= Ed White (astronaut) =

American astronaut (1930–1967)

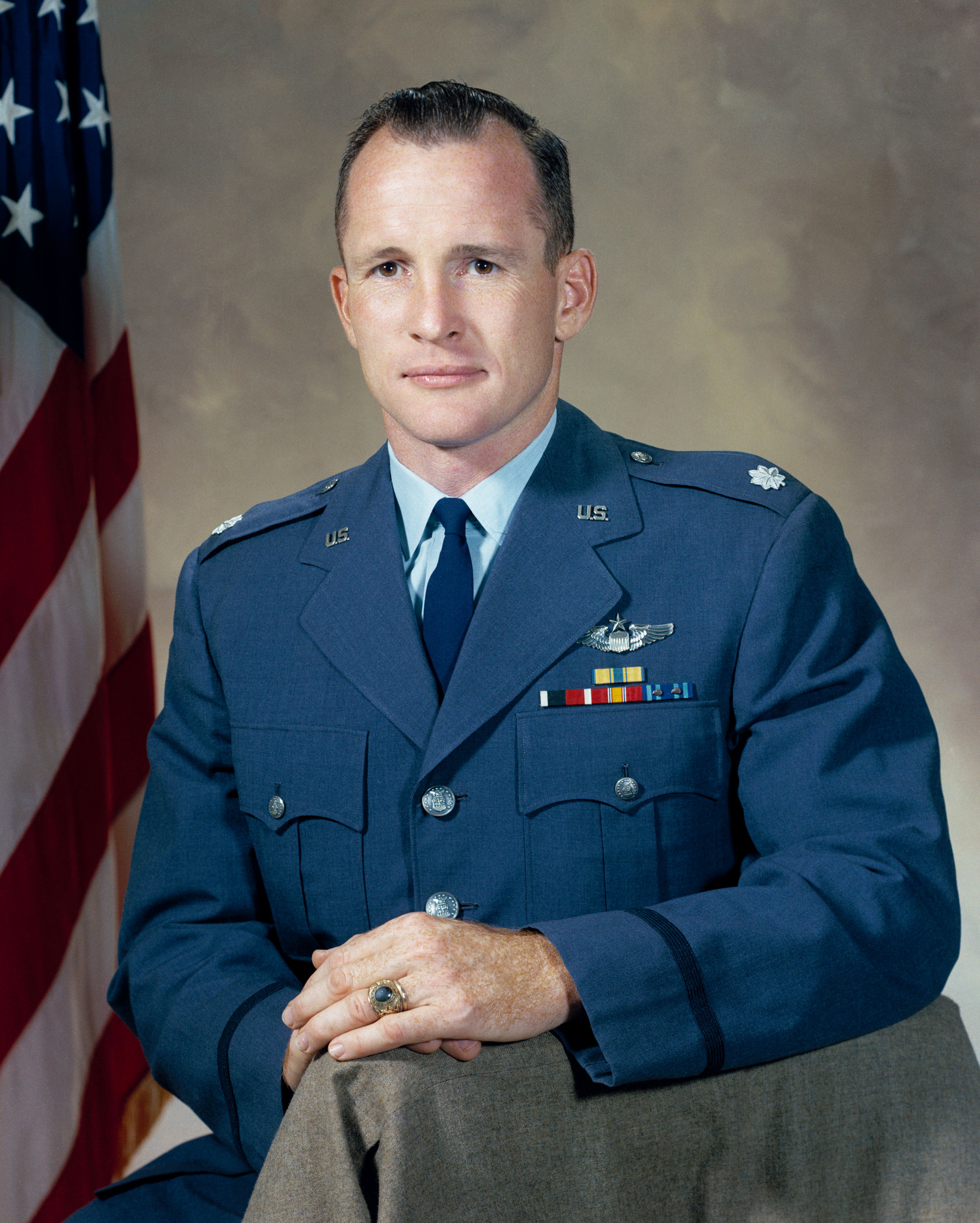
- White in 1966
- Born: Edward Higgins White II; November 14, 1930; San Antonio, Texas, U.S.
- Died: January 27, 1967 (aged 36); Cape Kennedy, Florida, U.S.
- Resting place: West Point Cemetery
- Education: United States Military Academy (BS); University of Michigan (MS)
- Spouse: Patricia Eileen Finegan (m. 1953)
- Children: 2
- Awards: Air Force Commendation Medal; Congressional Space Medal of Honor; NASA Distinguished Service Medal; NASA Exceptional Service Medal
- Space career

NASA astronaut
- Rank: Lieutenant Colonel, USAF
- Time in space: 4d 1h 56m
- Selection: NASA Group 2 (1962)
- Total EVAs: 1
- Total EVA time: 36m
- Mission: Gemini 4 Apollo 1

Edward Higgins White II (November 14, 1930 – January 27, 1967) was an American aeronautical engineer, United States Air Force officer, test pilot, and NASA astronaut. He was a member of the crews of Gemini 4 and Apollo 1.

After graduating from West Point in 1952 with a Bachelor of Science degree, White was sent to flight training, and assigned to the 22nd Fighter Day Squadron at Bitburg Air Base, West Germany, where he flew the F-86 Sabre and F-100 Super Sabre fighters. In 1958, he enrolled in the University of Michigan to study aeronautical engineering, receiving his Master of Science degree in 1959. White then received test pilot training at Edwards Air Force Base, California, before being assigned as a test pilot for the Aeronautical Systems Division at Wright-Patterson Air Force Base, Ohio.

White was selected as one of the second group of astronauts, the so-called "Next Nine", who were chosen to take part in the Gemini and Apollo missions. He was assigned as pilot of Gemini 4 alongside command pilot James McDivitt. On June 3, 1965, White became the first American to walk in space. He was then assigned as senior pilot of the first crewed Apollo mission, Apollo 1. White died on January 27, 1967, alongside astronauts Virgil "Gus" Grissom and Roger B. Chaffee in a fire during pre-launch testing for Apollo 1 at Cape Canaveral, Florida. He was awarded the NASA Distinguished Service Medal for his flight in Gemini 4 and was then awarded the Congressional Space Medal of Honor posthumously.

== Early life ==
Edward Higgins White II was born on November 14, 1930, in San Antonio, Texas, the son of Edward Higgins White Sr., a West Point graduate who later rose to become a major general in the United States Air Force (USAF), and Mary Rosina White (née Haller). He had a younger brother, James Blair White, and an older sister, Jeanne. His interest in aviation was sparked at the age of twelve when his father took him for a ride in a North American T-6 Texan trainer. He became a member of the Boy Scouts of America, where he earned the rank of Second Class Scout.

Due to the nature of his father's job, White's family moved often to different military bases across the country throughout his childhood. The White family moved from San Antonio, Texas to Dayton, Ohio, where he attended Oakwood Junior High School, and to Washington, D.C., where he attended Western High School. After graduating in 1948, he wanted to follow in his father's footsteps and attend West Point, but his family's peripatetic life presented a problem: an appointment to West Point from a United States Congressman was required, and the family had not been continuously resident in any one place for very long. White went down to the Capitol and knocked on Congressmen's doors seeking an appointment, armed with a glowing reference from his high school principal. He eventually secured one from Congressman Ross Rizley from Oklahoma.

White entered West Point on July 15, 1948. He acquired the nickname "Red" from the color of his hair. While at West Point, White competed for a spot on the 1952 U.S. Olympic team in the 400 meter hurdles race, but missed qualification in the heat by 0.4 seconds. White was also a half-back on the West Point soccer team. His hobbies included squash, handball, swimming, golf, and photography. His classmates included Michael Collins, who later became an astronaut as well.

=== Military service ===
Upon graduation with a Bachelor of Science degree from West Point, ranked 128th out of 523 in the Class of 1952, White was commissioned as a second lieutenant in the Air Force. Under a 1949 agreement, up to 25 percent of the graduating classes of West Point and the United States Naval Academy at Annapolis could volunteer for the Air Force. Between 1950, when the agreement became effective, and 1959, when the first class graduated from the United States Air Force Academy, about 3,200 West Point cadets and Annapolis midshipmen chose to do so. White received his initial pilot training at Bartow Air Base, Florida, and his jet training at James Connally Air Force Base, Texas. After receiving his pilot wings in 1953, White was assigned to Luke Air Force Base, Arizona, for Fighter Gunnery School. In February 1953, White married Patricia Eileen Finegan (1934–1983), whom he had met at a West Point football game. They had two children, Edward Higgins White III (born in 1953) and Bonnie Lynn White (born in 1956).

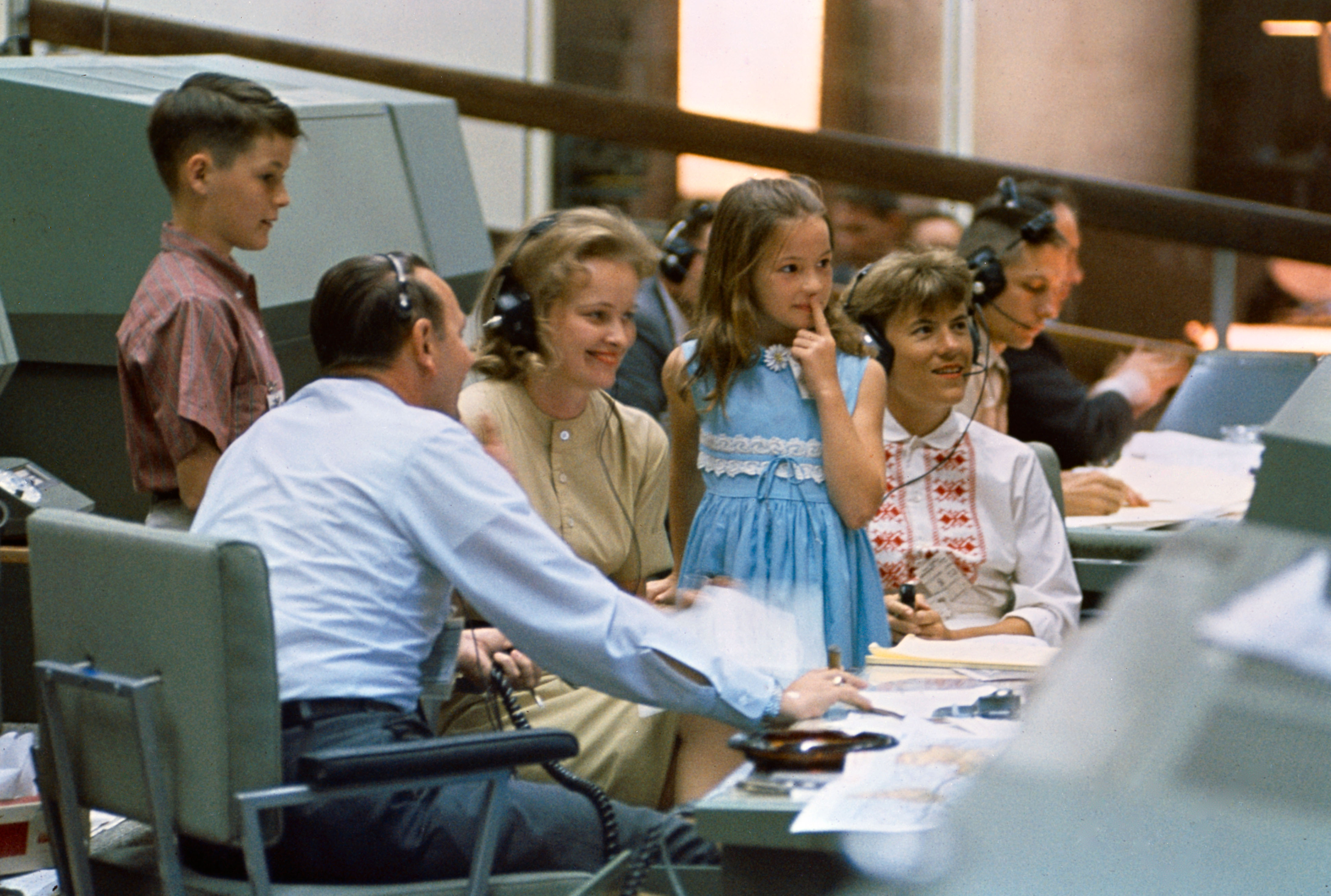
The families of Gemini 4 astronauts visit Mission Control in Houston. Right to left: Patricia McDivitt, Bonnie White, Patricia White, flight controller Christopher Kraft, and Edward White III.

White was assigned to the 22nd Fighter Squadron at Bitburg Air Base in West Germany, where he spent three and a half years flying North American F-86 Sabre and North American F-100 Super Sabre fighters. Among his colleagues were Buzz Aldrin, who graduated a year ahead of him at West Point, and James Salter. In 1957, White read an article about the astronauts of the future, and decided to become one. He believed that getting an advanced degree would improve his chances of being selected. Aldrin later recalled that White convinced him to follow this path as well. In September 1958, White enrolled in the University of Michigan under Air Force sponsorship to study aeronautical engineering. His classmates included James McDivitt, Jim Irwin and Ted Freeman. White was awarded his Master of Science degree in 1959.

After it became clear that being a test pilot would also improve his chances of being selected to become an astronaut, White attended the U.S. Air Force Test Pilot School at Edwards Air Force Base, California, with class 59-C, which graduated in July 1959. McDivitt was one of his classmates. White was assigned to the Aeronautical Systems Division at Wright-Patterson Air Force Base, Ohio. There, he did flight tests for weapons development, and helped make recommendations for aircraft design on aircraft such as the Fairchild C-123 Provider, Convair C-131 Samaritan, Boeing C-135 Stratolifter, the North American F-100 Super Sabre, Convair F-102 Delta Dagger and Lockheed T-33 Shooting Star. As a weightlessness- and extended-flight-training captain, he piloted the planes that were used to train astronauts in weightlessness. His passengers included John Glenn, the first American to orbit the Earth, and Ham, the first hominid in space. During his career, White would log more than 3,000 flight hours with the Air Force, including about 2,200 hours in jets.

== NASA career ==
=== Gemini program ===
White was one of eleven pilots whose names the Air Force submitted to NASA in 1962 as potential candidates for the second group of astronauts. He was then selected as one of 32 finalists who would undergo medical and psychological examinations at Brooks Air Force Base in San Antonio. White arrived at the Aerospace Medical Center at Brooks AFB on July 30, 1962. He ran around the perimeter of Brooks every day during the testing to keep in shape.

White was one of nine men chosen by NASA as part of Astronaut Group 2 in September 1962. Their selection was announced at a press conference in Cullen Auditorium at the University of Houston on September 17, 1962. Like their predecessors, the Mercury Seven, each of the new astronauts was assigned an area of specialization within the crewed space program: in White's case, flight control systems.

==== Gemini 4 ====
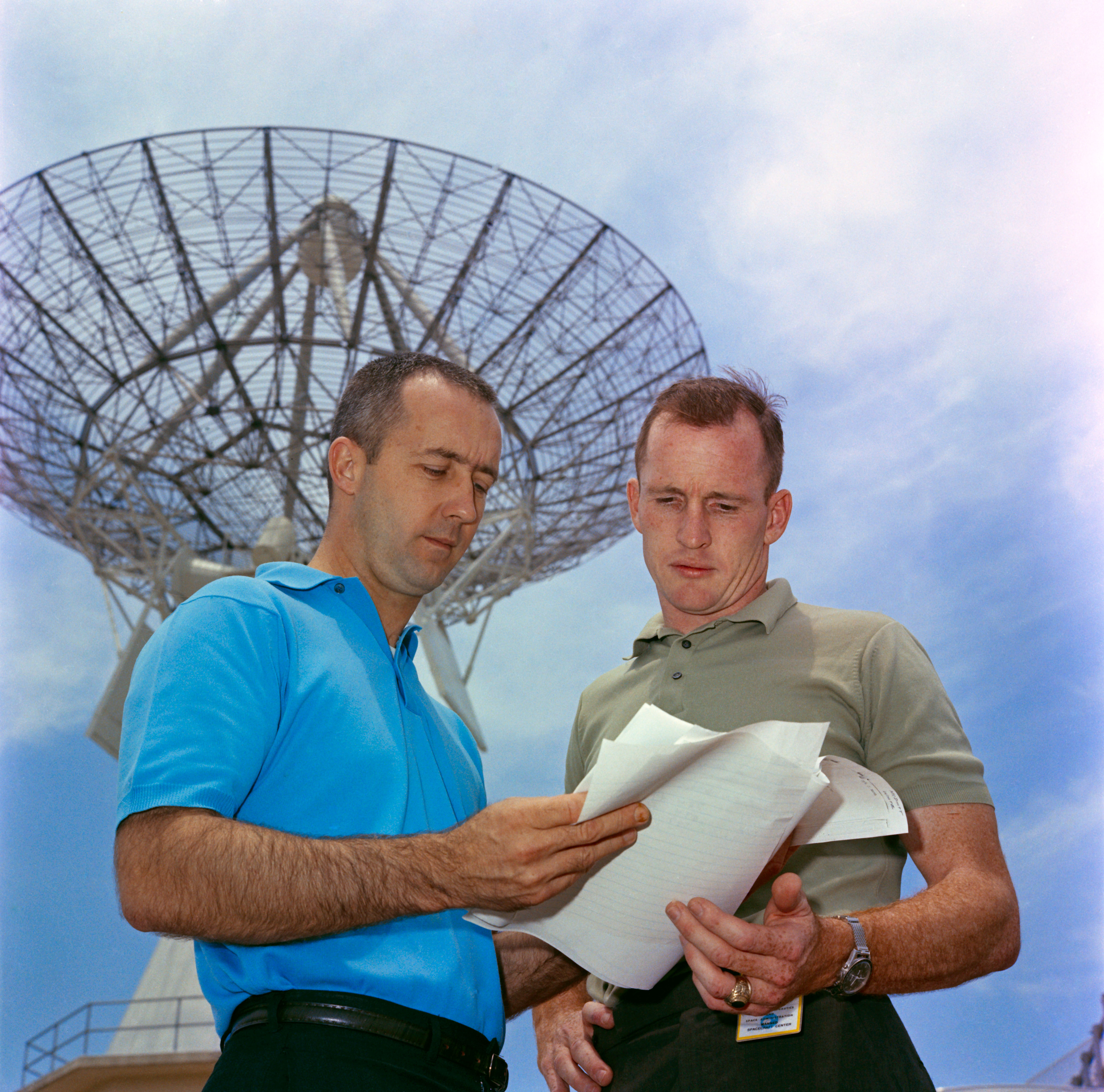
Edward White with Jim McDivitt (left) reading training plans for Gemini 4 mission

White was selected to be the pilot of Gemini 4, with McDivitt as his command pilot. The Chief of the Astronaut Office, Mercury Seven astronaut Deke Slayton, paired them because they knew each other well, having attended the University of Michigan and test pilot school together. The mission objectives were ill-defined at first, but consideration was given to performing extravehicular activity (EVA), space rendezvous and orbital station-keeping.

Knowing that EVA (or spacewalk) was a possibility, McDivitt pressed for it to be included in the mission. As a result, NASA management agreed to ensure that the Gemini space suit for the mission was capable of being used for EVA. Kenneth S. Kleinknecht told the July 1964 press conference that announced the mission that one of the crew might open the hatch and stick his head outside, but this attracted little attention. On March 18, 1965, cosmonaut Alexei Leonov became the first man to perform an EVA, on the Voskhod 2 mission, but not until May 25 was EVA approved for Gemini 4 by NASA administrator James E. Webb.

White was a devout Methodist. On the Gemini 4 mission he carried three pieces of religious jewelry to take with him on his EVA: a gold cross, a St. Christopher Medal and a Star of David. White commented: "I felt while I couldn't take one for every religion in the country, I could take the items most familiar to me."

On June 3, 1965, the Gemini 4 crew was launched into space to begin its four-day mission. After separation from the Titan II upper stage, McDivitt attempted to rendezvous with the booster. However, this was unsuccessful since the astronauts were not adequately trained to rendezvous in orbit. The objective had to be abandoned since the allocated propellant had been used up, and the maneuvers had pushed the spacecraft's orbit too far away from Earth. The mission also included 11 different scientific experiments, including the use of a sextant for celestial navigation.

After the failed rendezvous attempt, White appeared tired and hot, so the EVA was postponed from the second revolution to the third revolution. At 19:46 UTC, White became the first American to make an EVA. During his spacewalk, White used an oxygen-propelled gun called the Hand-Held Maneuvering Unit to propel himself. White found the experience so exhilarating that he was reluctant to terminate the EVA at the allotted time, and had to be ordered back into the spacecraft.

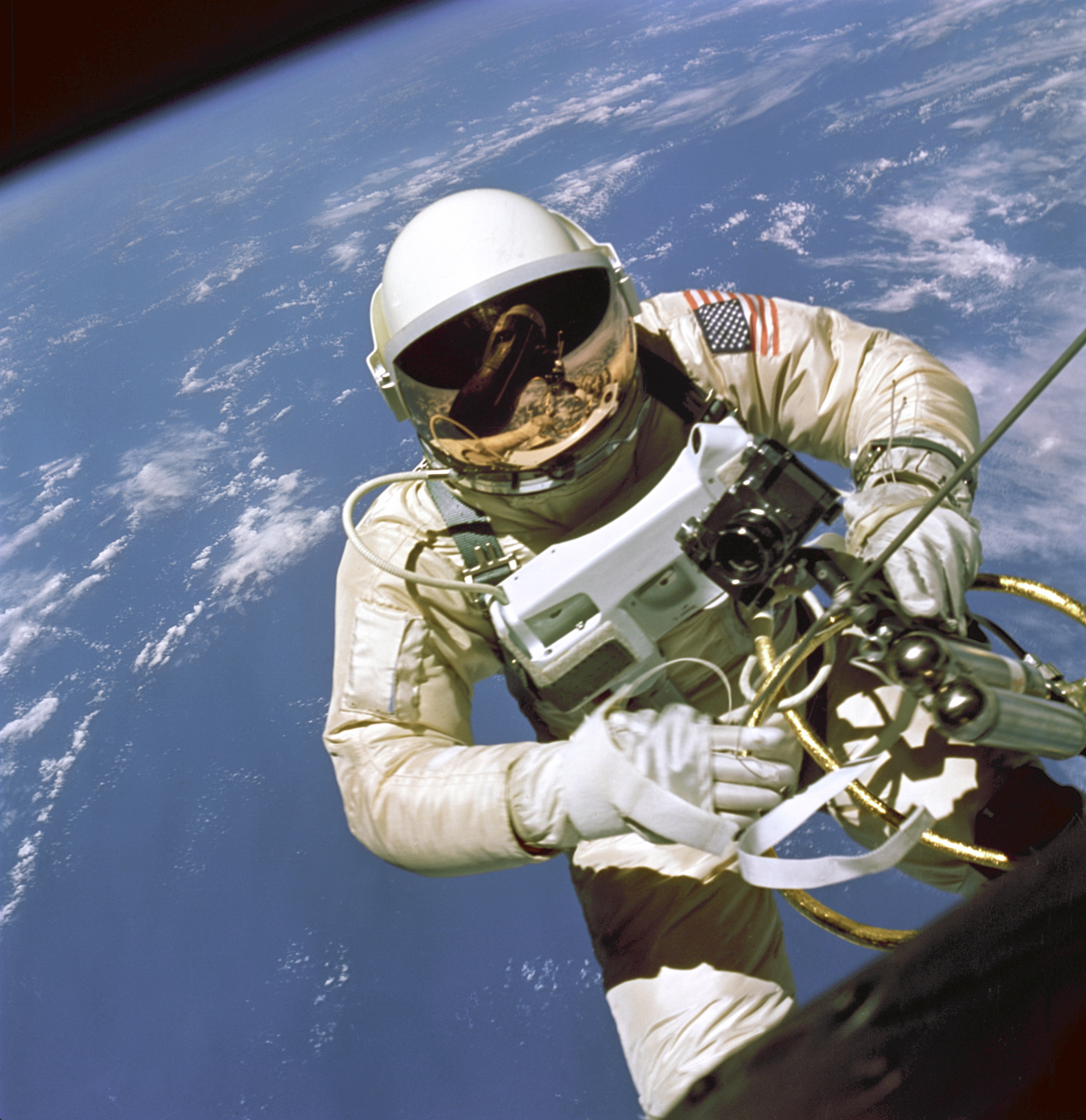
White during EVA. During the Gemini 4 mission, he became the first American astronaut to perform a spacewalk

While White was outside, a spare thermal glove floated away through the open hatch of the spacecraft, becoming an early piece of space debris in low Earth orbit, until it burned up upon re-entry into the Earth's atmosphere. There was a mechanical problem with the hatch mechanism, which made it difficult to open and to relatch. McDivitt was able to get the door locked by using his glove to push on the gears that controlled the mechanism. This added to the time constraint of the spacewalk and could have threatened the lives of both men if McDivitt had been unable to get the hatch latched, as they could not re-enter the atmosphere with an unsealed hatch.

I'm coming back in... and it's the saddest moment of my life.

— Astronaut Edward H. White while reentering the spacecraft after his EVA,

When they returned to Earth, the two astronauts found that they were now celebrities. President Lyndon B. Johnson came to Houston to congratulate them, and he promoted them to the rank of lieutenant colonel. Later that week they traveled to the White House where Johnson presented them the NASA Exceptional Service Medal. They were given a ticker tape parade in Chicago, and went to the 1965 Paris Air Show, where they met cosmonaut Yuri Gagarin.

White's next assignment after Gemini 4 was as the backup for Gemini 7 command pilot Frank Borman, with Michael Collins assigned as his pilot. He was also named the astronaut specialist for the flight control systems of the Apollo command module. Under the usual procedure of crew rotation in the Gemini program, White would have been in line for a second flight as the command pilot of Gemini 10 in July 1966, which would have made him the first of his group to fly twice. Instead, he was selected for the Apollo 1 spaceflight.

=== Apollo program ===
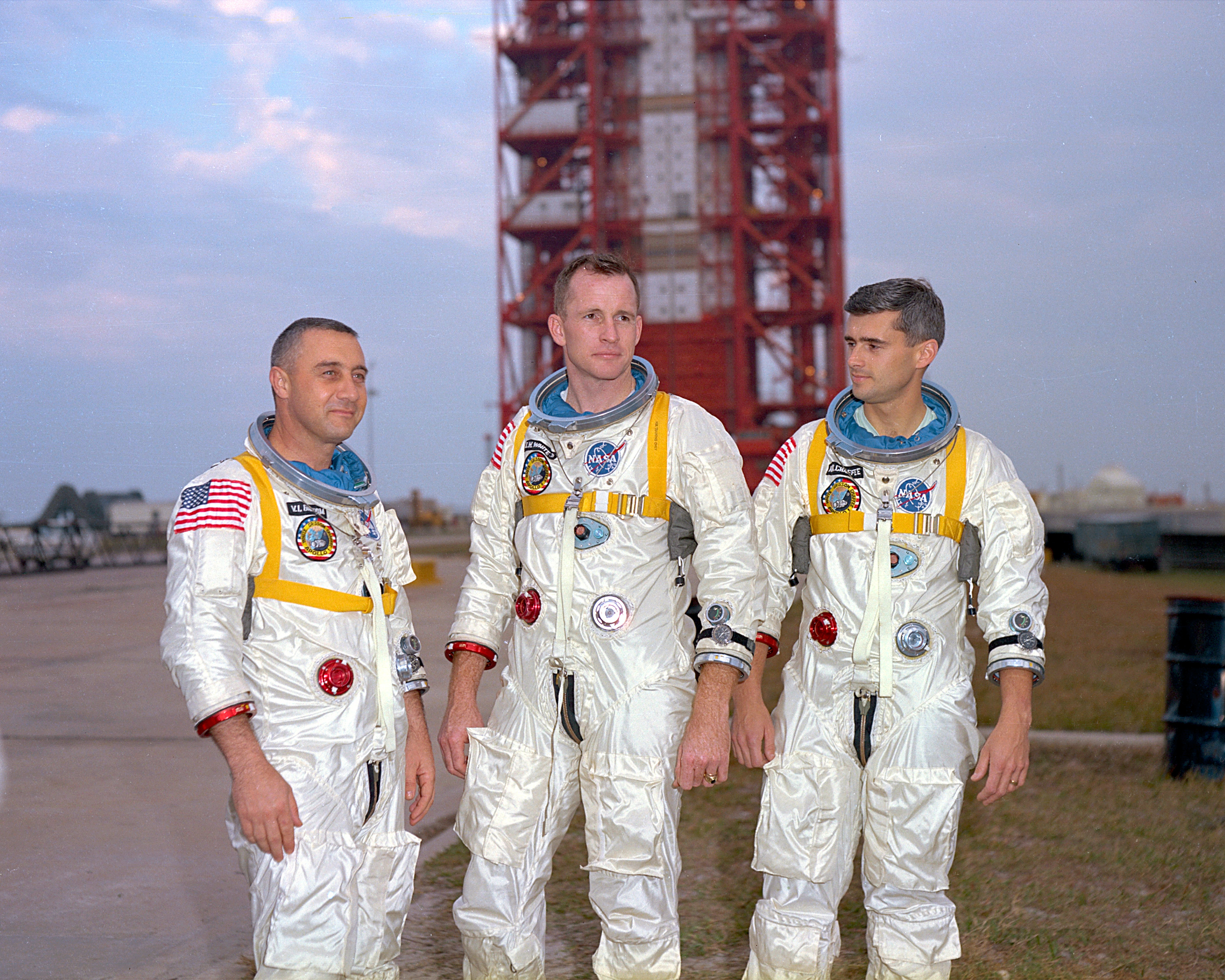
Apollo 1 crew: Grissom, White, and Chaffee

In March 1966, White was selected as senior pilot (second seat) for the first crewed Apollo flight, designated AS-204. His fellow astronauts would be Command Pilot Virgil "Gus" Grissom, who had flown in space on the Mercury-Redstone 4 mission in 1961 and as commander of the Gemini 3 in 1965, and Pilot Roger Chaffee, who had yet to fly into space. The mission, which the men named Apollo 1 in June, was originally planned for late 1966 to coincide with the last Gemini mission, but the impracticality of making the Gemini capsule and systems compatible with Apollo and delays in the spacecraft development pushed the launch into 1967.

The launch of Apollo 1 was planned for February 21, 1967. The crew entered the spacecraft at 13:00 on January 27, mounted atop its Saturn IB booster on Launch Pad 34 at Cape Kennedy, for a "plugs-out" test of the spacecraft. The test was to demonstrate all of the space vehicle systems and procedures, which included an abbreviated countdown and flight simulation. It was not classified as hazardous since the rocket would not be fueled during the test. The test's progress was delayed by problems with a cabin odor and poor communications between the ground stations and the crew. At 18:31, a fire broke out in the pure oxygen-filled cabin, killing all three crewmen.

Emergency roles had called for White to actuate the inner hatch release handle; then, Grissom would assist him in the removal of the cover, while Chaffee would maintain communications. White had apparently tried to do his part: his body was found in his center seat, with his arms reaching over his head toward the hatch. Removing the cover to open the hatch was impossible because the plug door design required venting normally slightly greater-than-atmospheric pressure and pulling the cover into the cabin. Grissom was unable to reach the cabin vent control to his left, where the fire's source was located. The intense heat raised the cabin pressure even more, to 29 pounds per square inch (200 kPa), at which point the cabin walls ruptured. The astronauts were killed by asphyxiation, smoke inhalation, and thermal burns.

=== Aftermath ===
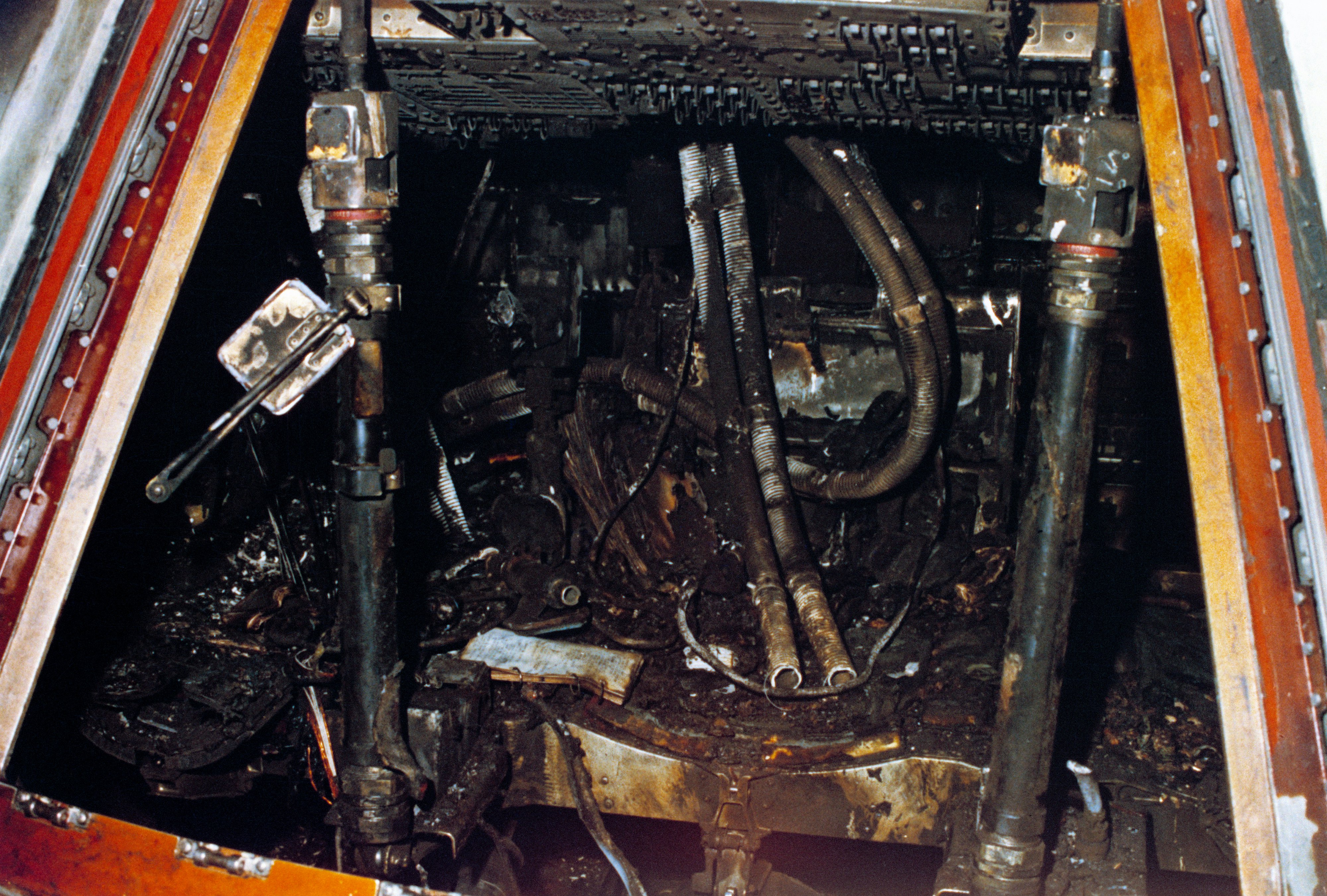
Charred remains of the Apollo 1 Command Module, in which White was killed along with Gus Grissom and Roger Chaffee

The fire's ignition source was determined to be a spark that jumped from a wire on the far left of the spacecraft, under Grissom's seat. Their deaths were attributed to a wide range of lethal hazards in the early Apollo Command Module design: workmanship and conditions of the test, including the highly pressurized 100% oxygen pre-launch atmosphere, many wiring and plumbing flaws, flammable materials used in the cockpit and the astronauts' flight suits, and a hatch which could not be quickly opened in an emergency. After the incident, these problems were fixed, and the Apollo program carried on successfully to reach its objective of landing men on the Moon.

White was buried with full military honors at West Point Cemetery while Grissom and Chaffee are both buried in Arlington National Cemetery. NASA officials attempted to pressure Patricia White, his widow, into allowing her husband also to be buried at Arlington, against what she knew to be his wishes; their efforts were foiled by astronaut Frank Borman. Patricia received $100,000 from the life insurance portion of the contract the astronauts signed to give two publishing firms exclusive rights to the stories and photographs of the astronauts and their families. She also received $16,250 annually for the life of the contract. Patricia later remarried and continued to reside in Houston. On September 6, 1983, she took her own life after surgery earlier in the year to remove a tumor.

White's younger brother James resolved to follow in his older brother's footsteps. He graduated from the Air Force Academy and became a fighter pilot. He set his sights on becoming a test pilot and then an astronaut. He thought that air combat experience would facilitate this, so he volunteered for service in the Vietnam War. While flying a combat mission on November 24, 1969, with 357th Tactical Fighter Squadron, he was killed when his aircraft crashed. Nearly half a century later his remains were identified, and they were buried adjacent to White's in West Point Cemetery on June 19, 2018.

== Organizations ==
White was a member of the Society of Experimental Test Pilots; associate member of Institute of Aerospace Sciences; Tau Beta Pi (Engineering Honorary); and Sigma Delta Psi (Athletic Honorary).

== Awards and honors ==
- Senior Astronaut Wings
- Air Force Commendation Medal
- Golden Plate Award of the American Academy of Achievement, 1965
- Medalha Bandeirantes va Cosmonautica
- Firefly Club Award
- Ten Outstanding Young Men of the Nation, 1965
- Five Outstanding Young Texans, 1965
- National Aviation Club's Achievement Award, 1966

White and McDivitt were presented honorary doctorate degrees in astronautical science by the University of Michigan after their Gemini 4 flight. The duo were also awarded the Arnold Air Society's John F. Kennedy Trophy. White received the 1965 General Thomas D. White National Defense Award for his spacewalk. It is a trophy given by the National Geographic Society to outstanding air force personnel. He was inducted into the Aerospace Primus Club (the "most exclusive club on Earth") for his EVA. He was awarded the AIAA Haley Astronautics Award for 1967. The Apollo 1 crew was awarded the NASA Distinguished Service Medal posthumously in a 1969 presentation of the Presidential Medal of Freedom to the Apollo 11 crew. President Clinton presented the White and Chaffee families with the Congressional Space Medal of Honor in 1997 (Grissom's family received the medal in 1978).

White, along with nine other Gemini astronauts, was inducted into the International Space Hall of Fame in 1982. He was inducted into the U.S. Astronaut Hall of Fame in 1993 and the National Aviation Hall of Fame on July 18, 2009.

== Memorials ==
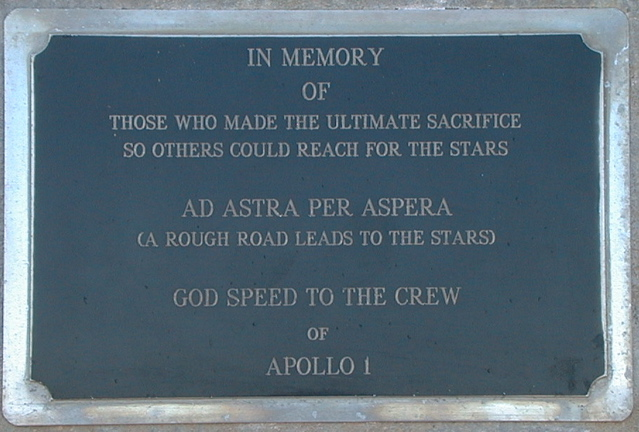
One of two Apollo 1 memorial plaques at Cape Canaveral Air Force Station Launch Complex 34

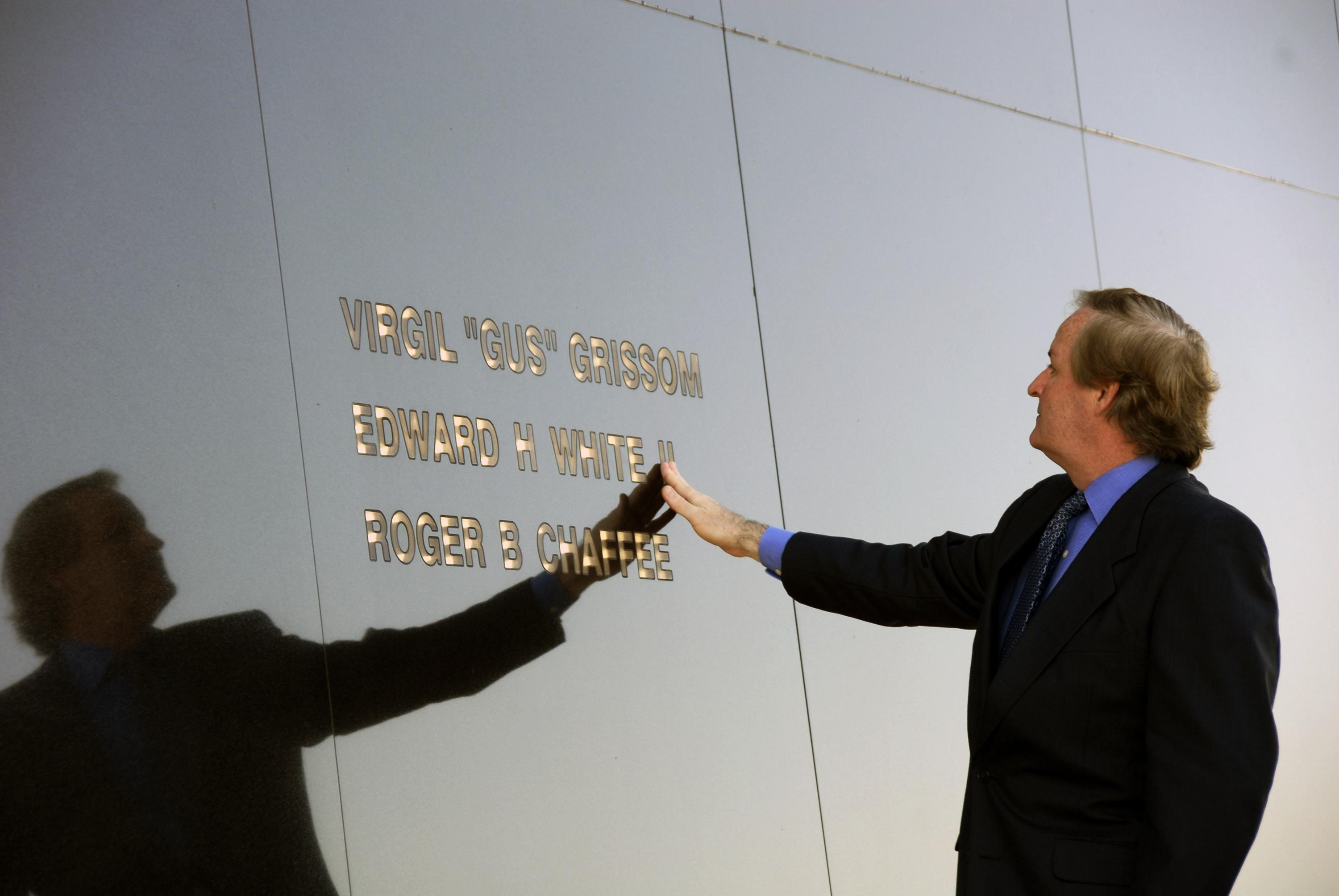
Ed White III touches his father's name engraved in the Space Mirror Memorial at the KSC Visitor Complex.

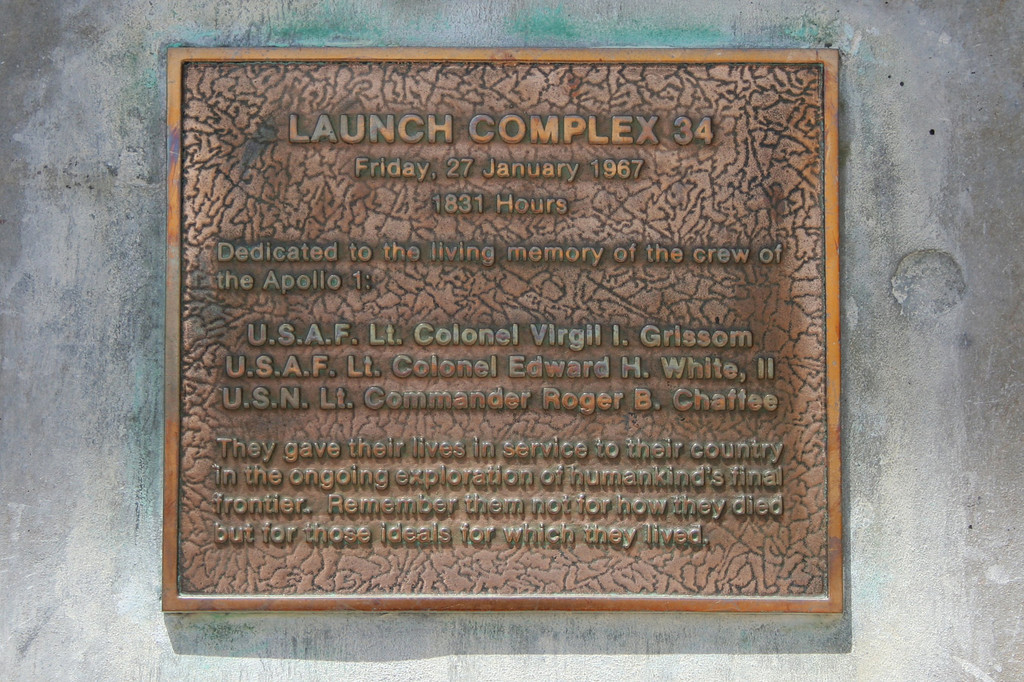
Launch Complex 34 Plaque

=== Schools ===
Many schools have been named in honor of White:

- Edward White Elementary Career Academy in Chicago
- Edward H. White Middle School in White's hometown of San Antonio, Texas
- Edward H. White II Elementary School in El Lago, Texas
- Edward White Elementary School in Eldridge, Iowa
- Ed White Memorial High School in League City, Texas
- Edward H. White High School in Jacksonville, Florida
- Edward H. White Elementary School in Houston, Texas.
- Ed White Middle School in Huntsville, Alabama. Huntsville is home to NASA's Marshall Space Flight Center and has strong community ties to the space program. At the same time, the Huntsville City Schools named Roger B. Chaffee Elementary School and Virgil I. Grissom High School for White's fallen Apollo 1 crewmates.
- Edward H. White Memorial Youth Center, Seabrook, Texas

=== Other sites ===
- Edward White Hospital in St. Petersburg, Florida (closed in 2014).
- Edward H. White II Park in Fullerton, California. Fullerton has also named parks in honor of Chaffee and Grissom.
- Island White, an artificial island in Long Beach Harbor off Southern California.
- Edward H. White Hall was a dormitory at Sheppard Air Force Base in Wichita Falls, Texas.
- McDivitt-White Plaza is located outside West Hall at the University of Michigan. West Hall formerly housed the College of Engineering and counts James McDivitt and Ed White among its alumni (McDivitt earned his B.S. and White earned his M.S. at the University of Michigan).
- The dismantled Launch Pad 34 at Cape Canaveral bears two memorial plaques. One reads, "They gave their lives in service to their country in the ongoing exploration of humankind's final frontier. Remember them not for how they died but for those ideals for which they lived." and the other "In memory of those who made the ultimate sacrifice so others could reach for the stars. Ad astra per aspera, (a rough road leads to the stars). God speed to the crew of Apollo 1."
- Edward H. White II American Legion Post 521; Pasadena, Texas.
- Edward White Park in Garland, Texas.
- Edward White Way in Oakland, California, a service road which runs along the Southern edge of Oakland International Airport. The airport has multiple roads named after NASA astronauts.
- Edward H. White II Memorial Hangar, the formal dedication of Hangar 9 in Brooks City-Base in San Antonio

=== In space ===
Voyager Golden Record 112 astronaut

- The star Iota Ursae Majoris was nicknamed "Dnoces" ("Second", as in "Edward Higgins White the Second", spelled backwards).
- White Hill, 11.2 km (7.0 mi) northwest of Columbia Memorial Station on Mars, is a part of the Apollo 1 Hills.
- A photograph of White performing his Gemini 4 space walk is included as one of several images on the Voyager Golden Record.

=== Philatelic ===
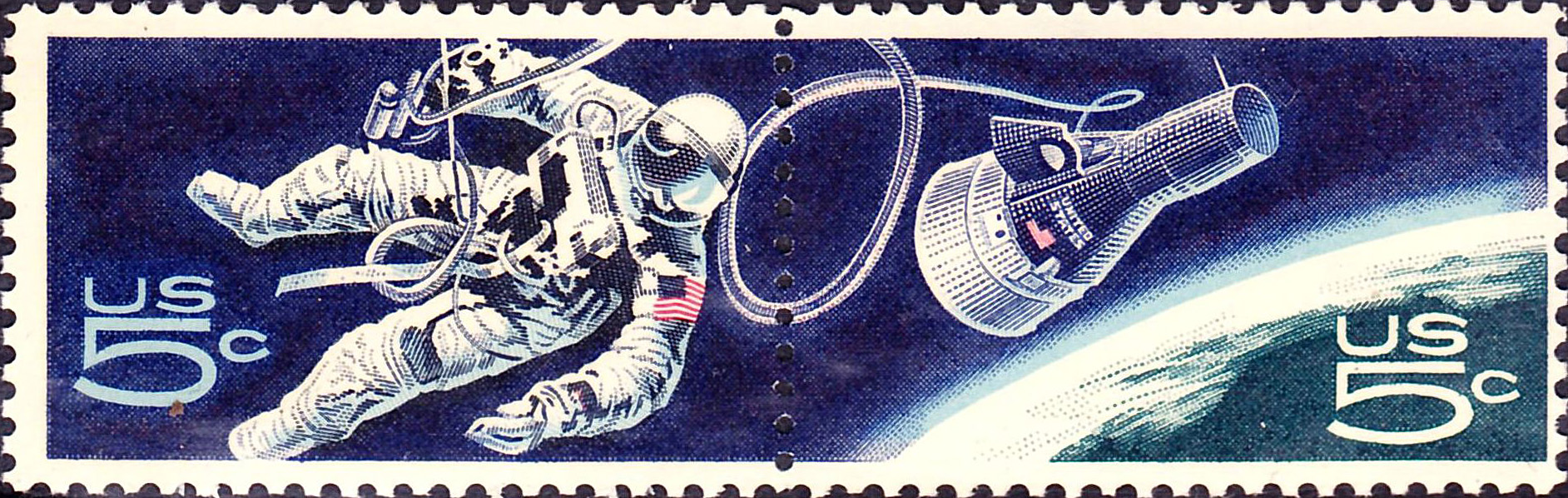
Accomplishments in Space Commemorative Issue of 1967

- Eight months after his death, in September 1967, a postage stamp was issued by the United States Post Office, commemorating White's spacewalk. It was the first time in USPO history that the design was actually spread over two stamps (one which featured White, the other his Gemini capsule, the two connected by a tether), which was considered befitting the "twins" aspect of the Gemini mission.

=== Omega Speedmaster "Ed White" ===
The Omega Speedmaster wristwatch reference 105.003 has come to be known as the "Ed White" as this reference was worn by White during his spacewalk. The Speedmaster remains the only watch qualified by NASA for EVA use.

== In media ==
White was played by Steven Ruge in the 1995 film Apollo 13, by Chris Isaak in the 1998 HBO miniseries From the Earth to the Moon, and by Matt Lanter in the 2015 ABC TV series The Astronaut Wives Club. In 2018, he was portrayed by Jason Clarke in First Man. White's voice during the flight is used in the British band Lemon Jelly's 2003 song Space Walk.

== See also ==
- Fallen Astronaut
- List of spaceflight-related accidents and incidents
