= Andy White (politician) =

American politician

Member of New Hampshire House of Representatives for Grafton 13
- In office 2009–2018
- Succeeded by: Laurel Stavis

Personal details
- Party: Democratic

Andrew (Andy) A. White is an American politician. He was a member of the New Hampshire House of Representatives and represented Grafton's 13th district.

White endorsed the Pete Buttigieg 2020 presidential campaign.
