= Anthony Whyte (writer) =

American novelist

Anthony Whyte is an African-American writer of urban literature and hip-hop literature.

== Career ==
Whyte began his writing career while still working for the New York City Administration for Children's Services. He began writing seriously when he became a member of The Tuesday Night Writers’ Workshop ran by Professor Sue Shapiro of the New York University School of Continuing Education, and within a year his first novel was published. Whyte grew up in The Bronx but also traveled and lived worldwide while serving in the U.S. Armed Forces. Today, he lives and writes in Inwood Neighborhood in upper Manhattan.

Whyte's writings are based on characters of hip-hop culture. His first novel, issued under the original title Ghetto Falsehoods, was published by !st Books Library in 2001. Shortly after its publication, Whyte discovered that his marketing vision was very different from his publishers' and decided to strike out on his own. As a result, he founded Augustus Publishing with Jason Claiborne, President of the company.

Whyte republished Ghetto Falsehoods and it became Ghetto Girls in 2002 and quickly landed on the Essence Magazine Best Seller List. His Ghetto Girls Series tells the tale of four young women attending NYC high schools who are talented singers and dancers. Two of the girls originate from upper parts of society and one is from the hood. The fourth girl has an uncle who is a clone of a Sean Combs (P. Diddy). Since then, Whyte also published Ghetto Girls Too and Ghetto Girls 3: Soo Hood.

Whyte credits writers including Chester Himes, Iceberg Slim and Shakespeare for influences. hip-hop literature, formerly known as street lit, is a form of writing that focuses on grittiness of city living. The style of hip-hop literature is spreading and now there are many novels on the market written by young black authors. While some had their beginnings in prison, not all authors or publishers focus on prison writers.

Whyte is unique as an author in that he is not only devoted to writing and publishing his own work, but also promotes and publishes works by new and emerging writers in the hip-hop genre. He often takes on the task of editing the work himself and uses professional readers and other editors to assist in the process. He calls members of this team "The Augustus Dream Team". Whyte is now branching out with other type stories to reach a wider audience.

Some newly published works from Augustus Publishing ("Where Hip Hop literature begins") include: It Can Happen In A Minute by S. M. Johnson, Booty Call *69 by Erick S. Gray, The Blue Circle by Keisha Seignious, If it Ain't One Thing It's Another by Sharron Doyle, A Good Day to Die by James Hendricks, Woman's Cry by Vanessa Martir, and Lipstick Diaries, an all-female anthology of ten emerging writers, with a foreword by Crystal Lacey Winslow from Melodrama Publishing.
