= Bob White (mayor) =

Bob White QSO CStJ JP

Mayor of Papatoetoe
- In office 1965–1986
- Preceded by: Lee Murdoch
- Succeeded by: Allan Brewster

Personal details
- Born: Robert Howard White; 25 December 1914 Auckland, New Zealand
- Died: 4 January 2006 (aged 91)

Robert Howard White QSO CStJ JP (25 December 1914 – 4 January 2006) was a New Zealand local-body politician.

== Biography ==
Born in Auckland on 25 December 1914, White was the son of Amy Charlotte and Alfred Horace White. He was educated at Seddon Memorial Technical College from 1927 to 1930. In 1941, he married Kitty Gwendolyn Mawkes, and the couple went on to have three children.

White served in the Royal New Zealand Air Force.

White was mayor of Papatoetoe from 1965 to 1986. During his tenure in the 1970s, he advocated for a rapid-rail system connecting South Auckland with Auckland City. In 1981 he successfully called for the inclusion of photographs on drivers licenses in an effort to reduce fraud.

In 1977, White received the Queen Elizabeth II Silver Jubilee Medal. In the 1982 New Year Honours, he was made a Queen's Service Order for public services. In 1975, he was appointed an Officer of the Order of St John, and in 1985 he was promoted to Commander of the Order of St John. In 1990, White was awarded the New Zealand 1990 Commemoration Medal.

Robert White Park in Papatoetoe is named after White.

Political offices
Preceded by Lee Murdoch	Mayor of Papatoetoe; 1965–1986	Succeeded by Allan Brewster
