= Tony White (cricketer) =

West Indian cricketer (1938–2023)

Personal information
- Full name: Anthony Wilbur White
- Born: 20 November 1938; Brighton, Saint Michael, Barbados
- Died: 16 August 2023 (aged 84); Barbados
- Batting: Right-handed
- Bowling: Right-arm off-spin, right-arm medium-pace

International information
- National side: West Indies
- Test debut: 3 March 1965 v Australia
- Last Test: 26 March 1965 v Australia

Career statistics
Competition	Test	First-class
Matches	2	31
Runs scored	71	996
Batting average	23.66	25.53
100s/50s	0/1	0/9
Top score	57*	75
Balls bowled	491	7,003
Wickets	3	95
Bowling average	50.66	28.05
5 wickets in innings	0	1
10 wickets in match	0	0
Best bowling	2/34	6/80
Catches/stumpings	1/–	32/–
- Source: CricInfo, 31 October 2022

Anthony Wilbur White (20 November 1938 – 16 August 2023) was a West Indian cricketer who played in two Test matches in 1965.

Tony White was a middle-order batsman and off-spinner who played for Barbados from 1958 to 1965–66. He toured England with the West Indian team in 1963 without playing in the Tests, joining the side midway through the tour as a back-up for the injured Willie Rodriguez.

White played his two Tests against the Australians in 1964–65. In the First Test he top-scored with 57 not out in the first innings, after coming in with the score at 149 for 6 and taking the total to 239 all out. Australian captain Bob Simpson later wrote that White "hit at everything bowled to him and slammed one of the longest sixes [Simpson had] ever seen". White also took three cheap wickets in a 179-run victory. But he failed to take a wicket off 52 overs in the drawn Second Test, scored only 7 and 4, and was replaced by Seymour Nurse for the Third Test.

White's best first-class bowling figures were 6 for 80 against Trinidad in 1960–61. His highest score was 75 against British Guiana in the final of the Pentangular Tournament in 1961–62, when he also scored 54 in the second innings and took four wickets in a losing cause.

After his cricket career, White lived in Venezuela for many years. He continued to play cricket recreationally, but is said to have preferred golf. He later returned to live in Marine Gardens, Christ Church, Barbados, where he died on 16 August 2023 at the age of 84.
