= Michael White =

Michael or Mike White may refer to:

== Academics ==
- Michael White (criminologist) (born 1951), professor of criminology at Arizona State University
- Michael White (psychotherapist) (1948–2008), Australian inventor of narrative therapy
- Michael J. White (sociologist), American sociologist and demographer
- Michael J. D. White (1910–1983), British zoologist
- L. Michael White, American theologian

== Journalism and literature ==
- Michael White (author) (1959–2018), British science writer and novelist
- Michael White (journalist) (born 1945), associate editor and former political editor of The Guardian newspaper
- Michael K. White (born 1961), American writer
- Mike White (journalist), New Zealand investigative journalist, photographer and author
- Mike White (born 1972), journalist and filmmaker and host of The Projection Booth podcast

== Music ==
- Michael White (clarinetist) (born 1954), New Orleans jazz musician
- Michael White (singer), country music artist
- Michael White (violinist) (1933–2016), jazz musician
- Michael White & the White, American hard rock combo and occasional Led Zeppelin tribute band
- Mick White (born 1967), English hard rock singer
- Trippie Redd (Michael White II, born 1999), American rapper

== Sports ==
=== American football ===
- Mike White (American football coach) (1936–2025), American football coach
- Mike White (defensive lineman) (born 1957), American football coach and former player
- Mike White (quarterback) (born 1995), American football quarterback

=== Other sports ===
- Michael White (baseball) (born 1968), first-round pick by the L.A. Dodgers in the 1986 draft
- Michael White (bobsleigh) (born 1964), Jamaican Olympic bobsledder
- Michael White (cricketer) (1913–2003), English cricketer
- Michael White (footballer) (born 1987), Waitakere United player
- Michael White (snooker player) (born 1991), Welsh snooker player
- Michael White (rugby union), Irish international rugby union player
- Mick White (Gaelic footballer) (Gaelic footballer) (born 1941)
- Mike White (baseball) (1938–2025), American baseball player
- Mike White (basketball) (born 1977), men's basketball head coach at the University of Georgia
- Mike White (softball) (born 1967), American softball coach

== Theater, television, and film ==
- Michael White (producer) (1936–2016), British theatre and film producer
- Michael Jai White (born 1967), American actor and martial artist
- Mike White (filmmaker) (born 1970), American film and television writer

== Politics and law ==
- Michael White (judge) (born 1953), Irish High Court judge
- Michael D. White (1827–1917), member of the U.S. House of Representatives from Indiana
- Michael R. White (politician) (born 1951), former mayor of Cleveland, Ohio

== Others ==
- Mike White (Alabama), American businessman and former actor, U.S. Navy SEAL, and college football player
- Michael White (businessman) (born 1972), owner of the Rite-Hite company
- Michael White (British Army officer) (1791–1868), British Army general
- Michael White (chef), American chef
- Michael R. White (U.S. veteran), U.S. Navy veteran imprisoned in Iran

== See also ==
- Michael Whyte (disambiguation)
- Michael Wight (born 1964), cricketer
- Mishael White, American politician
