= Frances White =

Frances White may refer to:

- Frances Emily White (1832–1903), American anatomist and physiologist
- Frances Hodges White (1866–1954), American writer of children's books
- Frances White (vaudeville) (1896–1969), American singer and actress
- Frances White (actress) (born 1938), English television and film performer
- E. Frances White (born 1949), American historian, author and academic
- Frances J. White (born 1958), American biological anthropologist
- Frances White (composer) (born 1960), American composer

== See also ==
- Frances Whyte, Scottish lawn and indoor bowler; gold medalist in 1985
- Deborah Frances-White (born 1979/80), Australian-British comedian
- Francis White (disambiguation)
