= British light cavalry during the Napoleonic Wars =

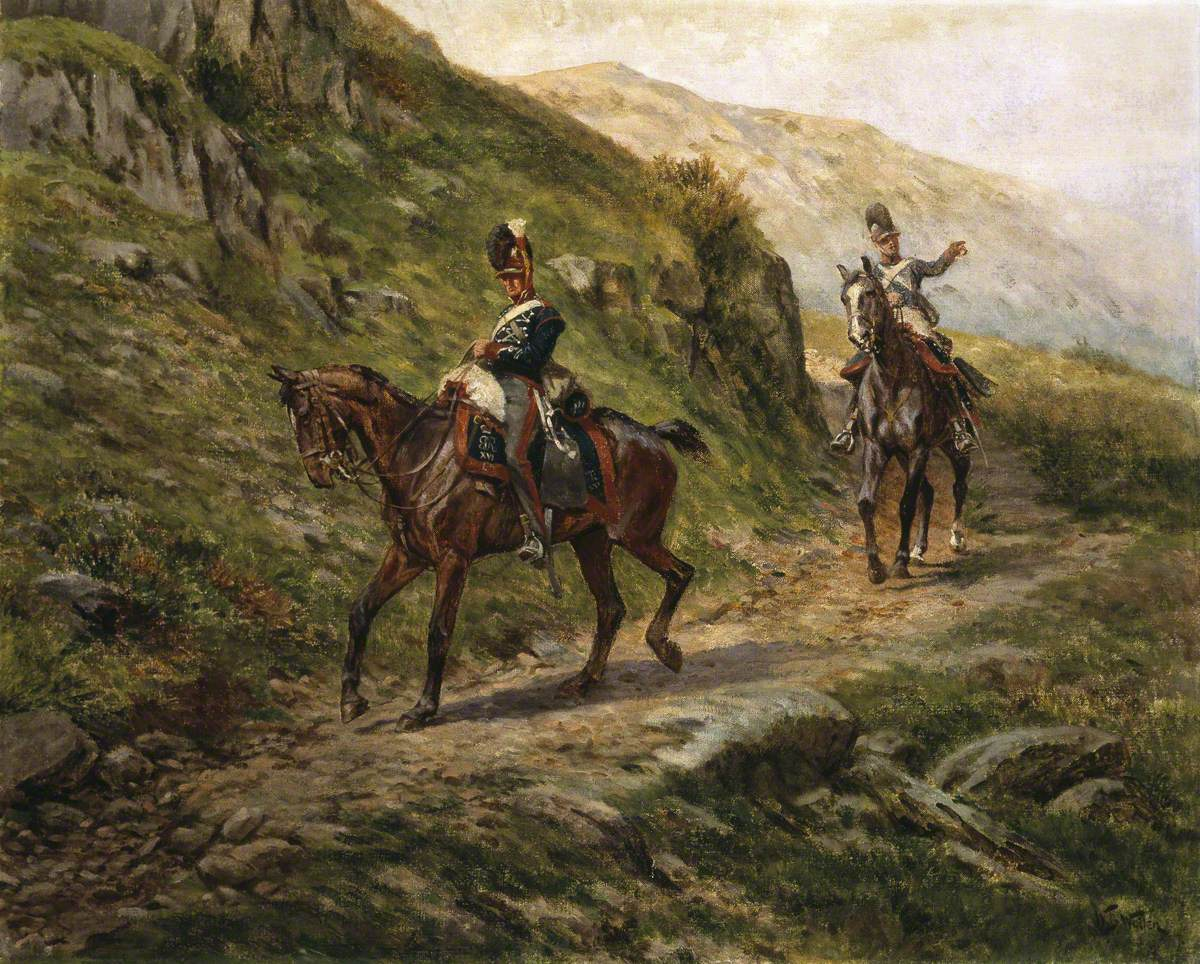
Painting of an officer and trooper of the 16th Light Dragoons in Spain in 1809

This is an outline of the British Army's light cavalry during the Napoleonic Wars, which consisted of the Light Dragoons and later Hussars, and from 1816 the lancers.

== Pre-Napoleonic ==
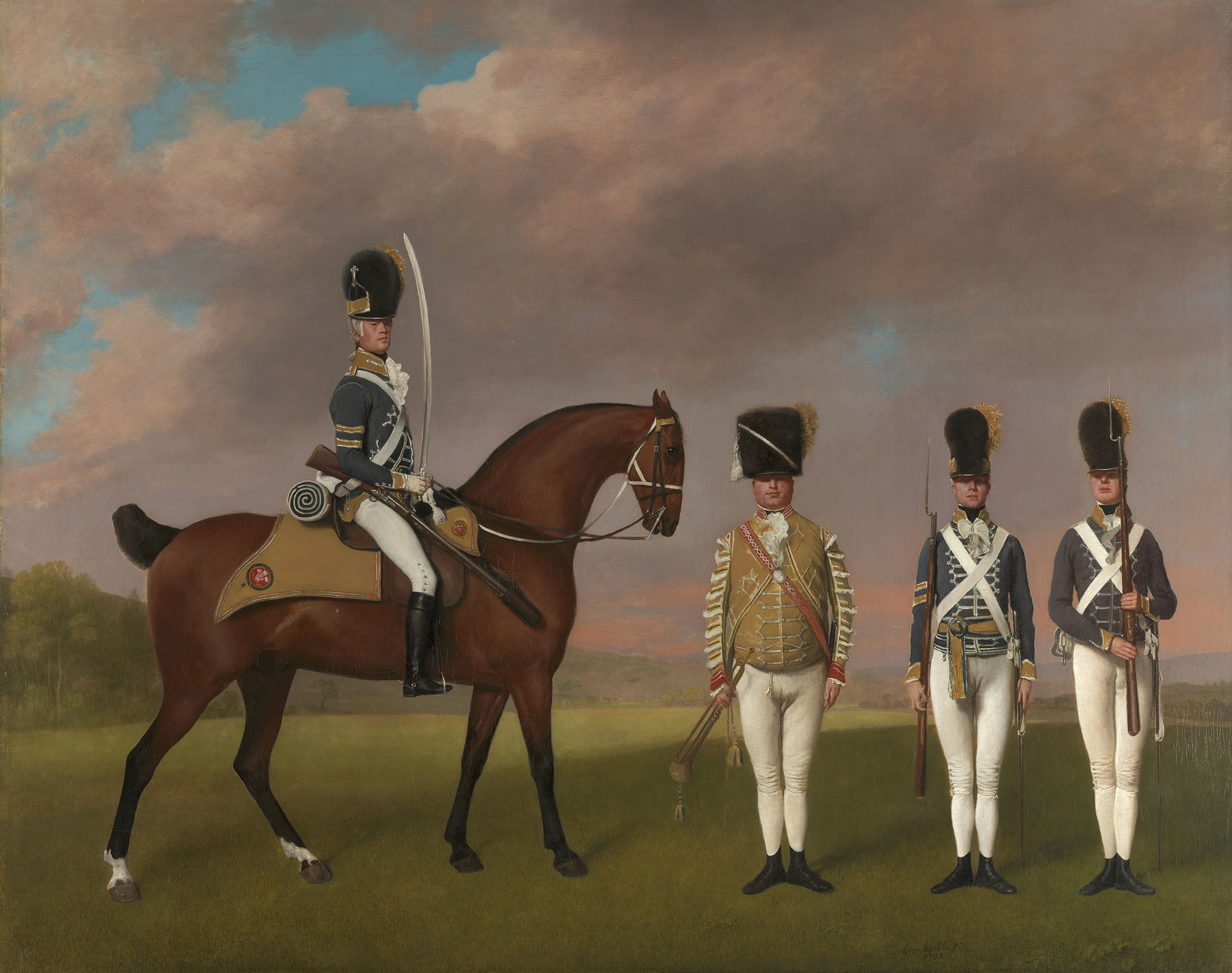
1793 painting of four 10th Light Dragoons soldiers

=== Background ===
In 1756, Horse Guards ordered that a troop of light horse be attached to each cavalry regiment. These new units proved so useful in the Seven Years' War, that in 1763 the 15th Dragoons were converted into 'light dragoons', as were the 17th–20th. By 1798 this arm had increased to some 23 regiments: the 7th–14th Dragoons had been converted, and 15 new regiments had been raised and retained in service. The 30th–33rd Light Dragoons had been raised in 1794, but with Britain's withdrawal from the Flanders campaign in 1795, they were disbanded again in early 1796. No details of their uniforms are known, and it is very doubtful they ever reached full strength. In 1806, the 7th, 10th, and 15th Dragoons were also "converted" - or rather "re-costumed" - to light dragoons.

=== Uniforms (standard) ===
In 1784 these light cavalry regiments changed their red coats for dark blue and the helmet assumed the form known as the "Tarleton", with black fur crest, turban in the facing colour, and the regimental badge on the left-hand side.

=== List of regiments in 1768 ===
Sources

- 15th Regiment of (Light) Dragoons — dark blue facings, white buttons in pairs, with white small clothes
- 16th Regiment of (Light) Dragoons — dark blue facings, white buttons in pairs, with white small clothes
- 17th Regiment of (Light) Dragoons — white facings, white buttons in pairs, with white small clothes
- 18th Regiment of (Light) Dragoons — white facings, white buttons in pairs, with white small clothes

== Napoleonic Wars ==
=== Background ===
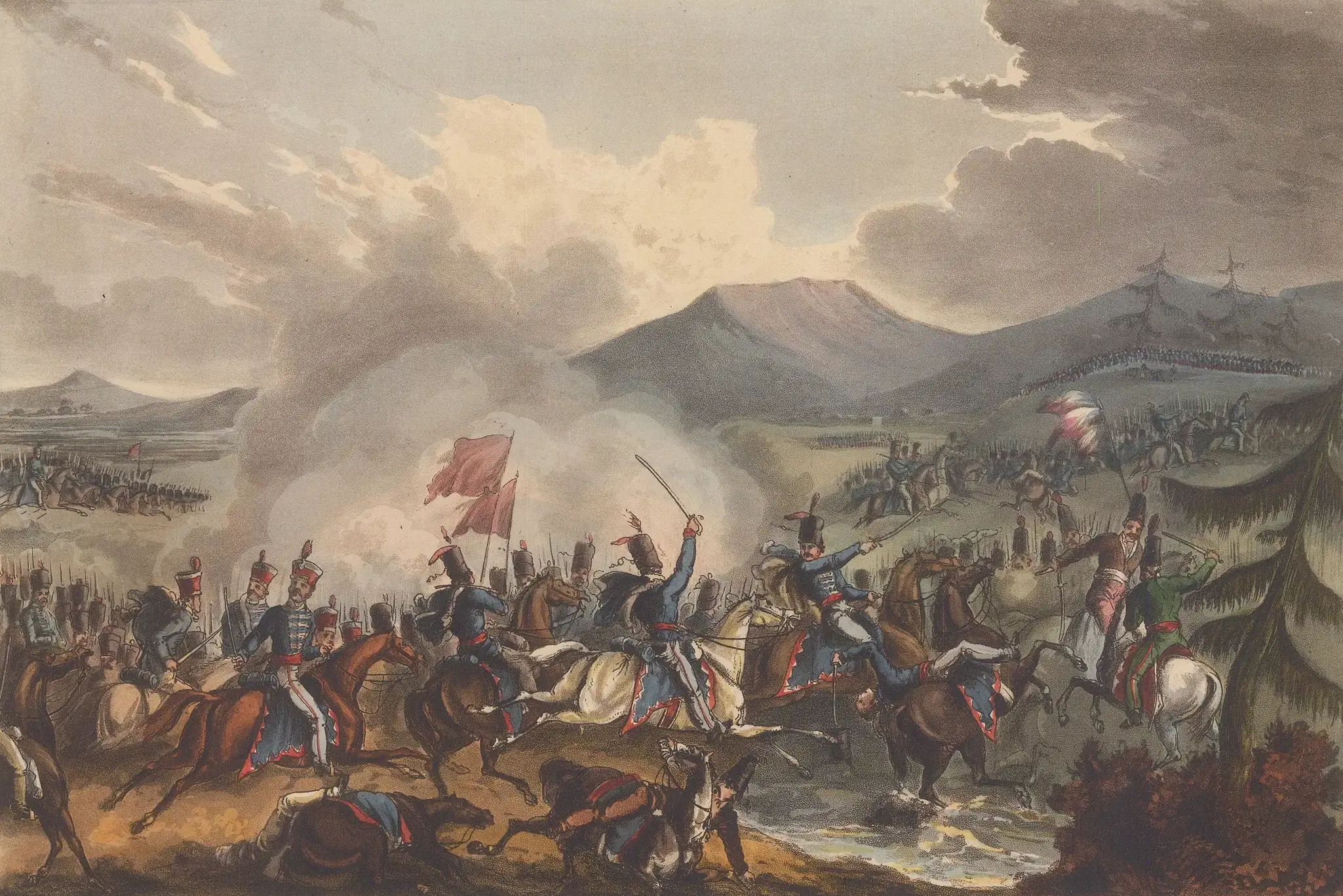
British hussars at the Battle of Morales in 1813

In 1803 the 10th Light Dragoons "converted to hussars". This conversion consisted mainly of sartorial changes: they abandoned the Tarleton helmet for the winged cap (mirliton), adopted the fur-lined pelisse, the barrel sash and the Mongolian Bock saddle. Forty Baker Rifles were issued to them, making them the first British cavalry regiment to use rifled weapons. In general, however, the old bicorns of the light dragoons and the Tarletons of the hussars were replaced by the shako at this time.

=== Uniforms (standard) ===
Each regiment wore a facing colour on collar, cuffs, and turnbacks. Pink seems to have been an unpopular facing colour: the 21st was given permission to change to black in 1814, and the 22nd to white in the following year.

=== 1812 uniform changes ===
==== Light Dragoons ====
In 1812 the French-style shako was introduced for the light dragoons. It had a black-within-white frontal cockade, regimental loop and button, traditional white over red plume and top band and chin scales in the button colour. The tunics were also changed from a dolman to a short-skirted double-breasted tunic in dark blue with facings shown on the collar, lapels, cuffs, turnbacks and piping around the pocket. The tunic was in a completely lancer-style fashion with the coloured lapels folded back in imitation of Napoleon's Polish Lancers. The men even wore a waist belt or sash with two dark blue stripes on a backing colour, and in the small of the back they had the "waterfall" of the lancers. White breeches or grey overalls were worn on campaign with twin stripes in the facing colour.

==== Hussars ====
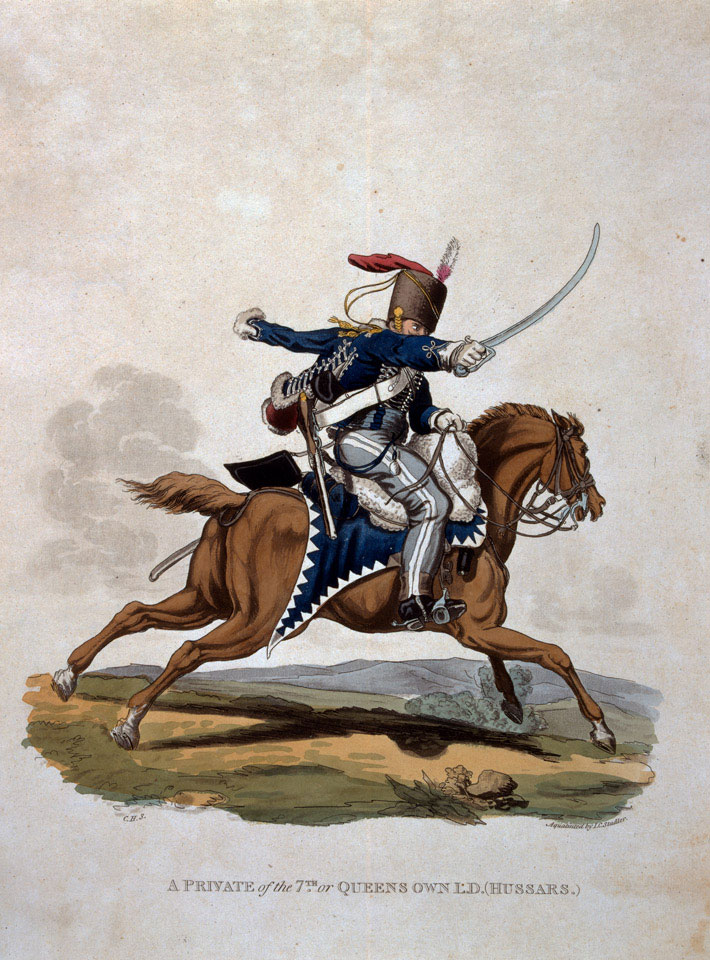
1812 engraving of a 7th Hussars private

Hussars wore a brown fur busby with red bag (except the 18th, which had blue). Dolman, lace, facings, and buttons were as before, a dark blue pelisse with a red and yellow barrel sash was worn by the men, crimson and gold for the officers.

=== List of regiments in 1806 ===
==== Hussars ====
- 7th (Queen's Own) Regiment of (Light) Dragoons (Hussars) — white facings, silver lace and buttons, blue and white sash
- 15th (King's) Regiment of (Light) Dragoons (Hussars) — red facings, silver lace and buttons, red and yellow sash
- 18th Regiment of (Light) Dragoons (Hussars) — white facings, silver lace and buttons, blue and white sash, grey dolmans

==== Light Dragoons ====
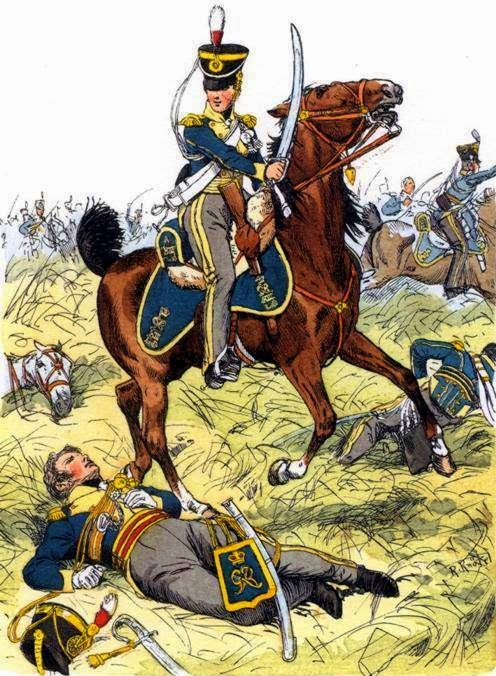
Illustration of British light dragoons between 1813 and 1815

- 8th (King's Royal Irish) Regiment of (Light) Dragoons — red facings, silver lace and buttons, blue and red belt, grey dolmans
- 9th Regiment of (Light) Dragoons — red facings, gold lace and buttons, blue and yellow belt
- 10th (Prince of Wales's Own Royal) Regiment of (Light) Dragoons — red facings, silver lace and buttons, red and yellow sash
- 11th Regiment of (Light) Dragoons — buff facings, silver lace and buttons, blue and buff belt
- 12th (Prince of Wales's) Regiment of (Light) Dragoons — yellow facings, silver lace and buttons, blue and yellow belt
- 13th Regiment of (Light) Dragoons — buff facings, gold lace and buttons, blue and buff belt
- 14th (Duchess of York's Own) Regiment of (Light) Dragoons — orange facings, silver lace and buttons, blue and orange belts
- 16th (Queen's) Regiment of (Light) Dragoons — red facings, silver lace and buttons, blue and red belt
- 17th Regiment of (Light) Dragoons — white facings, silver lace and buttons, blue and white belt
- 19th Regiment of (Light) Dragoons — yellow facings, gold lace and buttons, blue and yellow belt
- 20th Regiment of (Light) Dragoons — orange facings, gold lace and buttons, blue and orange belt
- 21st Regiment of (Light) Dragoons — pink facings (black from 1814), gold lace and buttons, blue and pink belt
- 22nd Regiment of (Light) Dragoons — pink facings, gold lace and buttons, blue and pink belt, grey dolmans
- 23rd Regiment of (Light) Dragoons — red facings (maybe yellow), silver lace and buttons, blue and red belt
- 24th Regiment of (Light) Dragoons — grey facings, gold lace and buttons, blue and grey belt
- 25th Regiment of (Light) Dragoons — grey facings, silver lace and buttons, blue and grey belt, grey dolmans

== Post-1815 ==
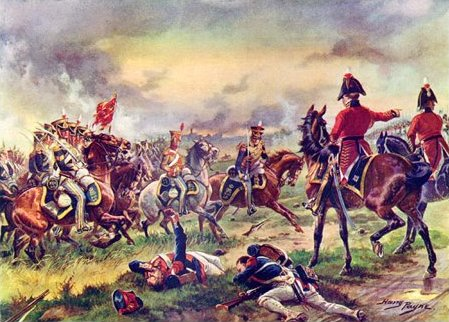
The 13th Light Dragoons at Waterloo.

The Napoleonic Wars came to an end in 1815; the list below shows the units which converted or changed from 1815 to 1820/21, as these were the last major changes until the Cardwell Reforms of 1874 and later the Childers Reforms of 1881.

=== Converted to Lancers ===
Sources

- 9th Regiment of (Light) Dragoons -> Lancers from 5 October 1816
- 12th (Prince of Wales's) Regiment of (Light) Dragoons -> Lancers from 1816, 'Royal Regiment' from 1817
- 16th (Queen's) Regiment of (Light) Dragoons -> Lancers from 30 September 1816
- 19th Regiment of (Light) Dragoons -> Lancers from 30 September 1816

=== Disbanded ===
Sources

- 18th Regiment of (Light) Dragoons (Hussars) — disbanded in September 1821
- 19th Regiment of (Light) Dragoons (Lancers) — disbanded in 1821
- 20th Regiment of (Light) Dragoons — disbanded in December 1818
- 21st Regiment of (Light) Dragoons — disbanded on 5 June 1820
- 22nd Regiment of (Light) Dragoons — disbanded 5 June 1820
- 23rd Regiment of (Light) Dragoons — disbanded in 1819
- 24th Regiment of (Light) Dragoons — disbanded 4 May 1819
- 25th Regiment of (Light) Dragoons — disbanded 24 November 1819

== Cape Mounted Riflemen ==
In October 1806 Donald McDonald formed "A Regiment at the Cape of Good Hope" comprising cavalry and infantry. The regiment was later designated by colonel's names: George Moncrieffe from 27 April 1811, G. S. Fraser from 21 October 1813. Was ordered to disbanded in 1812, but instead only partially reduced. In 1820, the regiment was renamed as the Cape Corps.

== See also ==
- British Army during the Napoleonic Wars
- Horses in the Napoleonic Wars
- Types of military forces in the Napoleonic Wars
