= General White =

General White may refer to:

== United Kingdom ==
- Geoffrey White (British Army officer) (1870–1959), British Army major general
- George White (British Army officer) (1835–1912), British Army general
- Henry Dalrymple White (1820–1886), British Army general
- Martin White (British Army officer) (born 1944), British Army major general
- Michael White (British Army officer) (1791–1868), British Army lieutenant general
- Robert White (British Army officer) (1827–1902), British Army general

== United States ==
- A. Arnim White (1889–1981), U.S. Army major general
- Anthony Walton White (1750–1803), Continental Army brigadier general
- Daniel White (general) (1833–1895), Union Army general
- Edward Higgins White Sr. (1901–1978), U.S. Air Force major general
- Frank G. White (1910–2002), U.S. Army major general
- George A. White (1880–1941), Oregon National Guard major general
- Isaac D. White (1901–1990), U.S. Army four-star general
- James White (general) (1747–1821), Tennessee Militia brigadier general
- Jerry White (Navigators) (born 1937), U.S. Air Force major general
- Julius White (1816–1890), Union Army brigadier general
- Robert Michael White (1924–2010), U.S. Air Force major general
- Robert P. White (born 1963), U.S. Army lieutenant general
- Thomas D. White (1901–1965), U.S. Air Force four-star general
- Thomas E. White (born 1943), U.S. Army brigadier general
- Tim White (newscaster/reporter) (born 1950), U.S. Air Force Reserves brigadier general
- William R. White (United States Army officer) (1887–1975), U.S. Army brigadier general
- William J. White (general) (1925–2017), U.S. Marine Corps lieutenant general

== Other ==
- Brudenell White (1876–1940), Australian Army general

== See also ==
- Barney White-Spunner (born 1957), British Army lieutenant general
- Attorney General White (disambiguation)
