= Frank White =

Frank White may refer to:

== Politics ==
- Frank White (Australian politician) (1830–1875), member of the New South Wales Legislative Assembly
- Frank White (Alabama politician) (1847–1922), U.S. Senator from Alabama
- Frank White (North Dakota politician) (1856–1940), Republican politician, eighth Governor of North Dakota, Treasurer of the United States
- Frank D. White (1933–2003), Governor of Arkansas, 1981–1983
- Frank White (British politician) (born 1939), British Labour Member of Parliament for Bury and Radcliffe, 1974–1983
- Frank White (Florida politician) (born 1978), member of the Florida House of Representatives

== Science ==
- Frank T. M. White (1909–1971), Australian mining and metallurgical engineer and mineral science educator
- Frank White (botanist) (1927–1994), expert on African flora and curator of the Oxford University herbarium
- Frank White (author), author of The Overview Effect: Space Exploration and Human Evolution and related books
- Frank M. White (1933–2022), American mechanical and ocean engineer

== Sports ==
- Frank W. White (1880–1947), American football head coach for the Temple University Owls
- Frank White (footballer) (1911–1985), English footballer
- Frank White (hurler) (1913–1984), Irish hurler
- Frank White (baseball) (born 1950), American baseball player and elected executive of Jackson County, Missouri

== Other ==
- Frank L. White (1867–1938), American chef best known as the model featured on Cream of Wheat cereal boxes
- Frank Russell White (1889–1961), American architect
- Frank G. White (1910–2002), American general
- Frank White (bishop) (born 1949), Church of England priest who served as Bishop of Brixworth and Assistant Bishop of Newcastle
- Frank White, an alias of The Notorious B.I.G. (1972–1997), American rapper
- Frank White, an alias of Fler (born 1982), German rapper

== See also ==
- Francis White (disambiguation)
- Franklin White (born 1946), Canadian public health scientist
- Franklin White (dancer) (1923–2013), British ballet dancer
