= Michael Whyte =

Michael Whyte may refer to:

- Michael Whyte (musician) in Attaxe (band)
- Michael Whyte (filmmaker), director of The Railway Station Man
- Mike Whyte, of Camber Corporation

== See also ==
- Michael White (disambiguation)
- Michael Wight (born 1964), cricketer
