= Horse artillery =

Cavalry assisted artillery

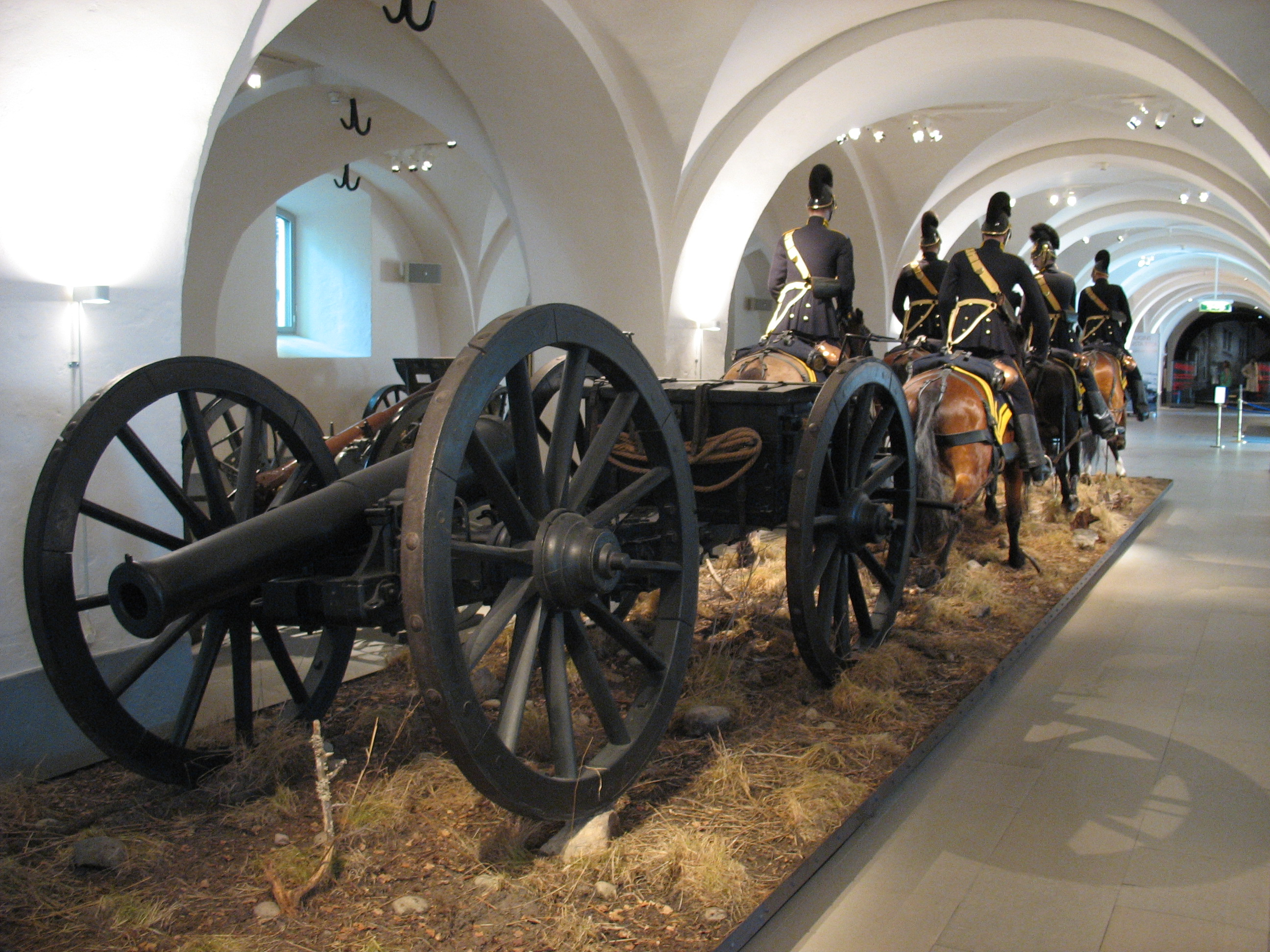
A lifesize model of a Swedish 1850s horse artillery team towing a light artillery piece, in the Swedish Army Museum, Stockholm.

Horse artillery was a type of light, fast-moving, and fast-firing field artillery that consisted of light cannons or howitzers attached to light but sturdy two-wheeled carriages called caissons or limbers, with the individual crewmen riding on horses. This was in contrast to other forms of field artillery which may also be horse-drawn but were heavier and whose gunners either marched on foot or were transported seated on the gun carriage, wagons or limbers. Horse artillery units provided highly mobile fire support especially to cavalry units, and existed in armies in Europe, the Americas, and Asia, from the early 17th to the mid-20th century.

== Tactics ==
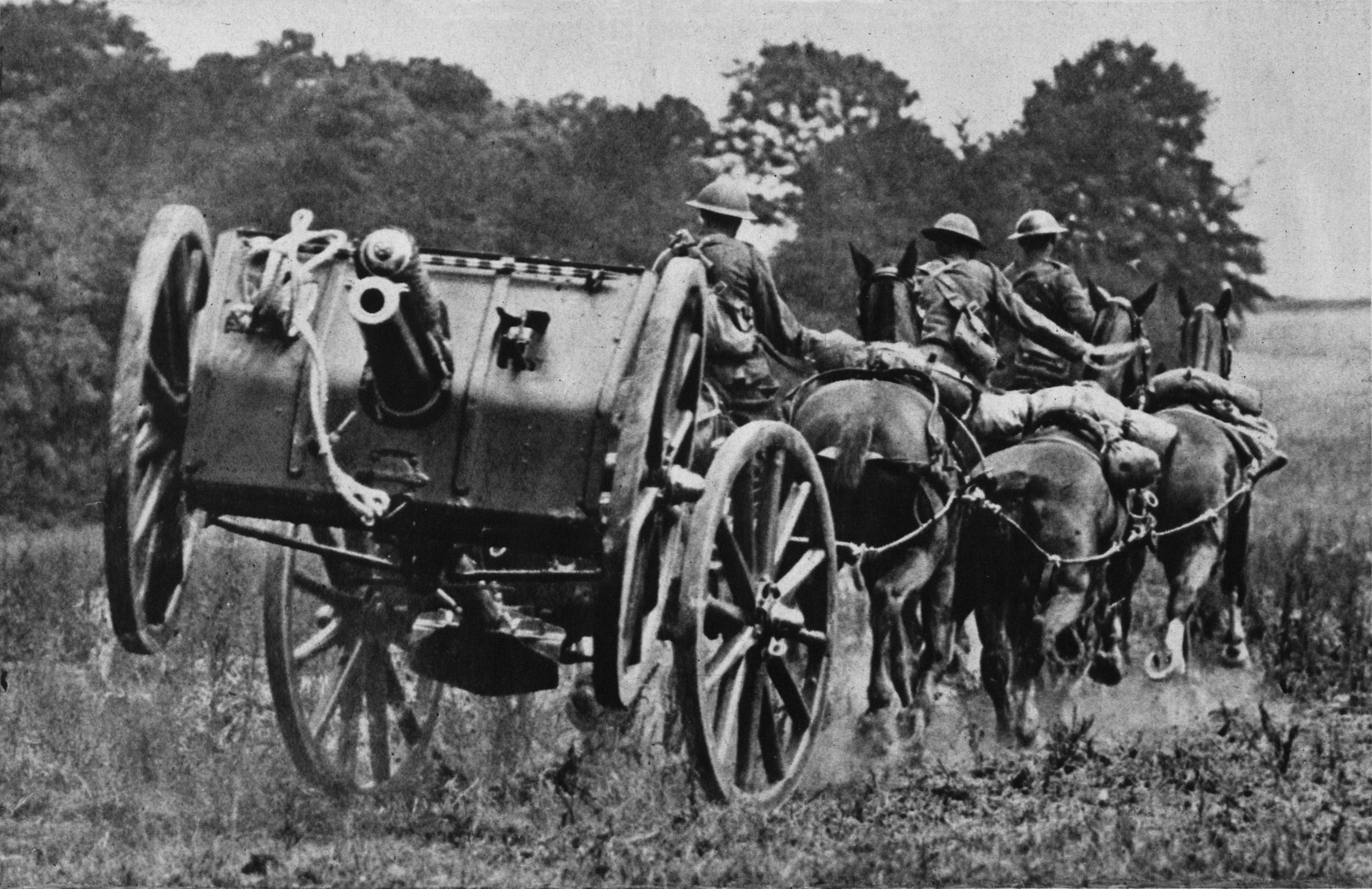
A QF 13-pounder of the Royal Horse Artillery moving into position on the Western Front during World War I

Once in position, horse artillery crews were trained to quickly dismount, deploy or unlimber their guns (detach them from their caissons), then rapidly fire grapeshot, shells or round shot at the enemy. They could then just as rapidly limber-up (reattach the guns to the caissons), remount, and be ready to move to a new position, similar to the shoot-and-scoot tactics of their modern counterparts.

Horse artillery was highly versatile and often supported friendly cavalry units by disrupting enemy infantry formations such as infantry squares with rapid concentrated fire. This would leave the enemy infantry vulnerable to cavalry charges. Their mobility also enabled them to outmaneuver enemy foot artillery units, and to act as a rearguard (in concert with friendly cavalry) to cover the retreat of slower units. A full battery could have a combined front of riders over 50 men strong. If the horse artillery was mistaken for cavalry, the enemy might receive an unpleasant surprise when the towed batteries wheeled around, unlimbered, loaded, sighted and opened fire. Highly proficient batteries could do so in less than a minute.

== History ==
=== Origins ===
Essentially a hybrid of cavalry and artillery, irregular horse artillery units were first used by Sweden in the 17th century during the Thirty Years' War by Lennart Torstensson. Torstensson was the artillery expert of Gustavus Adolphus of Sweden, and used them to provide cavalry with the fire support it needed to deal with massed infantry formations without sacrificing their speed and mobility. Gustavus Adolphus had previously tried intermixing infantry units with cavalry, and this was somewhat successful since the cavalry at that time did not charge the enemy at full gallop.

Others tried to combine firepower with mobility by using novel cavalry tactics such as the caracole, but these slowed the cavalry down and proved largely ineffective. The best solutions involved creating hybrid units of mounted infantry, most notably dragoons. Although they proved highly useful and versatile troops, whether they fired mounted or dismounted, they still had to slow down or at least stop temporarily, thereby losing their main advantages as cavalry.

In the early 18th century the Russian army began equipping cavalry formations with small units of light horse artillery equipped with 2-pound cannons, and portable 3-pound mortars which were transported on horseback (the weights refer to the size of the projectiles, not the artillery pieces.) Though not decisive by themselves, these units inflicted losses on Prussian troops and influenced Frederick the Great to form the first regular horse artillery unit in 1759.

=== 18th century modernization ===
Frederick understood that the greatest threat to massed infantry was concentrated artillery fire. He realized that even small and relatively light guns could severely disrupt or destroy infantry units if they could be brought in close enough and fire often enough. But since even light foot artillery travelled at the speed of a marching soldier, the solution was to make every artilleryman a part-time horseman. Through relentless drill and discipline Frederick emphasized mobility and speed in all phases of their operations. The unit consisted of a battery of six 6-pound cannons with 48 men, including 3 officers. The battery was wiped out and reformed twice in that same year at the Battle of Kunersdorf and the Battle of Maxen. Despite the setbacks, the new arm had proved so successful that it was quickly reorganized and by the start of the French Revolutionary Wars in 1792 consisted of three companies of 605 men, with batteries consisting of eight 6-pound guns and one 7-pound mortar each.

French artilleryman, engineer and general Jean-Baptiste de Gribeauval had served with the military mission to Prussia, as well as fighting against Frederick in the Seven Years' War. After that war he made numerous technical improvements to French cannons which made them lighter, faster and much easier to aim. These improvements proved a great advantage to horse artillery as well. Later, the British army officer Henry Shrapnel invented a deadly new type of ammunition that was put to effective use by horse artillery units.

The popularity of the new type of unit caught on quickly with other armies. Austria organized a limited amount of "cavalry artillery" in 1778 where most of the gun crew rode specially designed, padded gun carriages called Wursts ("sausages"), rather than on separate horses, into battle. Hanover formed its first cavalry batteries in 1786 and the Hanoverian general Victor von Trew performed several trials in 1791 which proved the great speed and efficiency by which an all-mounted crew could operate. At this time Denmark had also formed mounted artillery units and by 1792 Sweden had formed its first regular riding batteries, followed by Great Britain and the Dutch Republic in 1793, Russia in 1794 and Portugal in 1796.

=== 19th century zenith ===
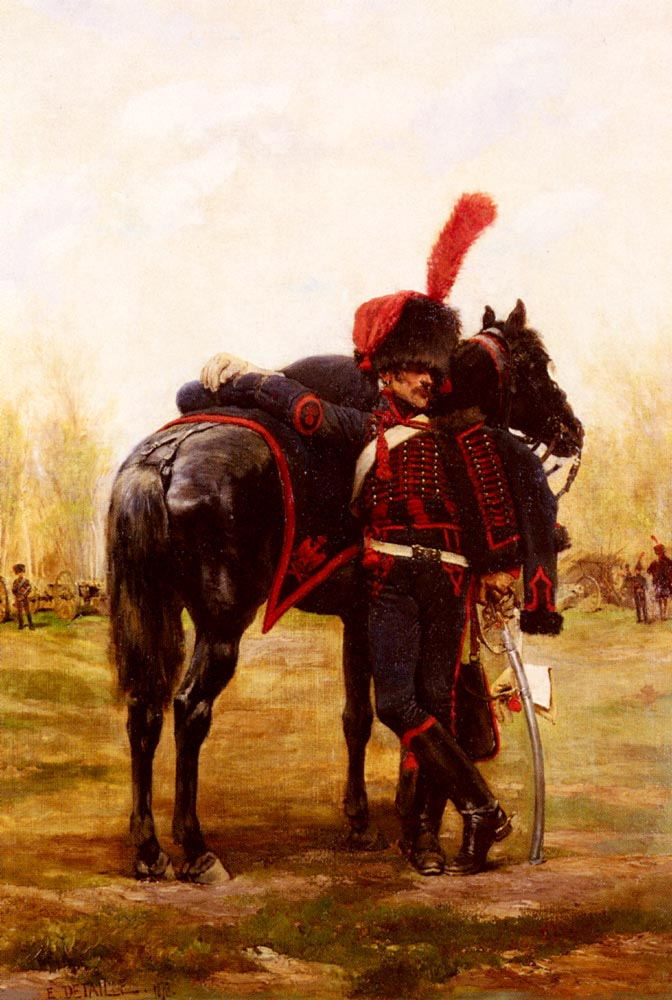
French horse artilleryman of the Imperial Guard

During the Napoleonic Wars, horse artillery would be used extensively and effectively in every major battle and campaign. The largest and probably most efficient horse artillery of any nation was that of the French revolutionary army which was first formed in 1792. The French units were especially well-trained and disciplined since the newly formed arm had proved very popular and could draw on a considerable number of recruits. By 1795 it had grown to eight regiments of six six-gun batteries each, making it the largest horse artillery force ever assembled.

Horse artillery units generally used lighter pieces (6-pounders), pulled by six horses. 9-pounders were pulled by eight horses, and heavier artillery pieces (12-pounders) needed a team of twelve horses. With the individual riding horses required for officers, surgeons and other support staff, as well as those pulling the artillery guns and supply wagons, an artillery battery of six guns could require 160 to 200 horses. Horse artillery usually came under the command of cavalry divisions, but in some battles, such as Waterloo, horse artillery was used as a rapid response force, repulsing attacks and assisting the infantry. Agility was important; the ideal artillery horse was around 15–16 hands high (150–160 cm, 60 to 64 inches), strongly built, but able to move quickly.

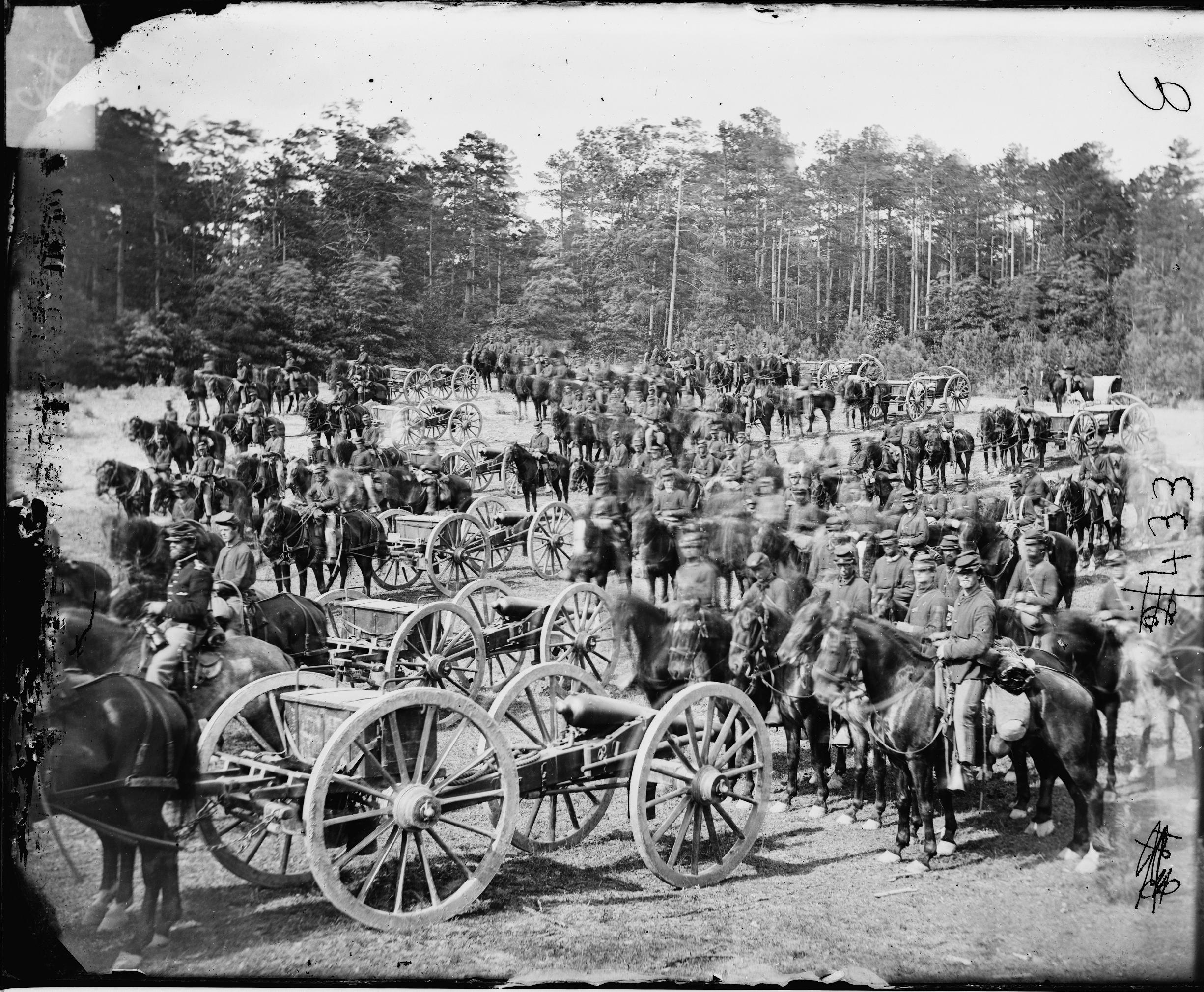
Battery M, 2nd U.S. Horse Artillery, 1862. Photo by James F. Gibson. Library of Congress

In the Mexican–American War, the U.S. Army horse artillery, or "flying artillery" played a decisive role in several key battles. In the American Civil War, various elements of the horse artillery of the Army of the Potomac were at times grouped together in the U.S. Horse Artillery Brigade. In the U.S., units of horse artillery were generally referred to officially as "light artillery". J. E. B. Stuart, head of cavalry in the Confederate Army in Virginia also put together a horse artillery battery under the command of John Pelham. Pelham and his guns would have distinguished service in 1862.

During the 19th and early 20th century, European-style horse artillery was used in South American countries such as Chile and Peru, quite prominently during the War of the Pacific.

=== Decline ===
As technology advanced and the firepower of infantry and foot artillery increased, the role of cavalry, and thus the horse artillery, began to decline. It continued to be used and improved into the early 20th century, seeing action during and in between both world wars. In World War I, Russia and some other countries equipped the artillery batteries of their cavalry divisions with the same field gun used by other units. France and the United Kingdom, however, used specialist horse guns (the Canon de 75 modèle 1912 Schneider and the Ordnance QF 13 pounder, respectively.)

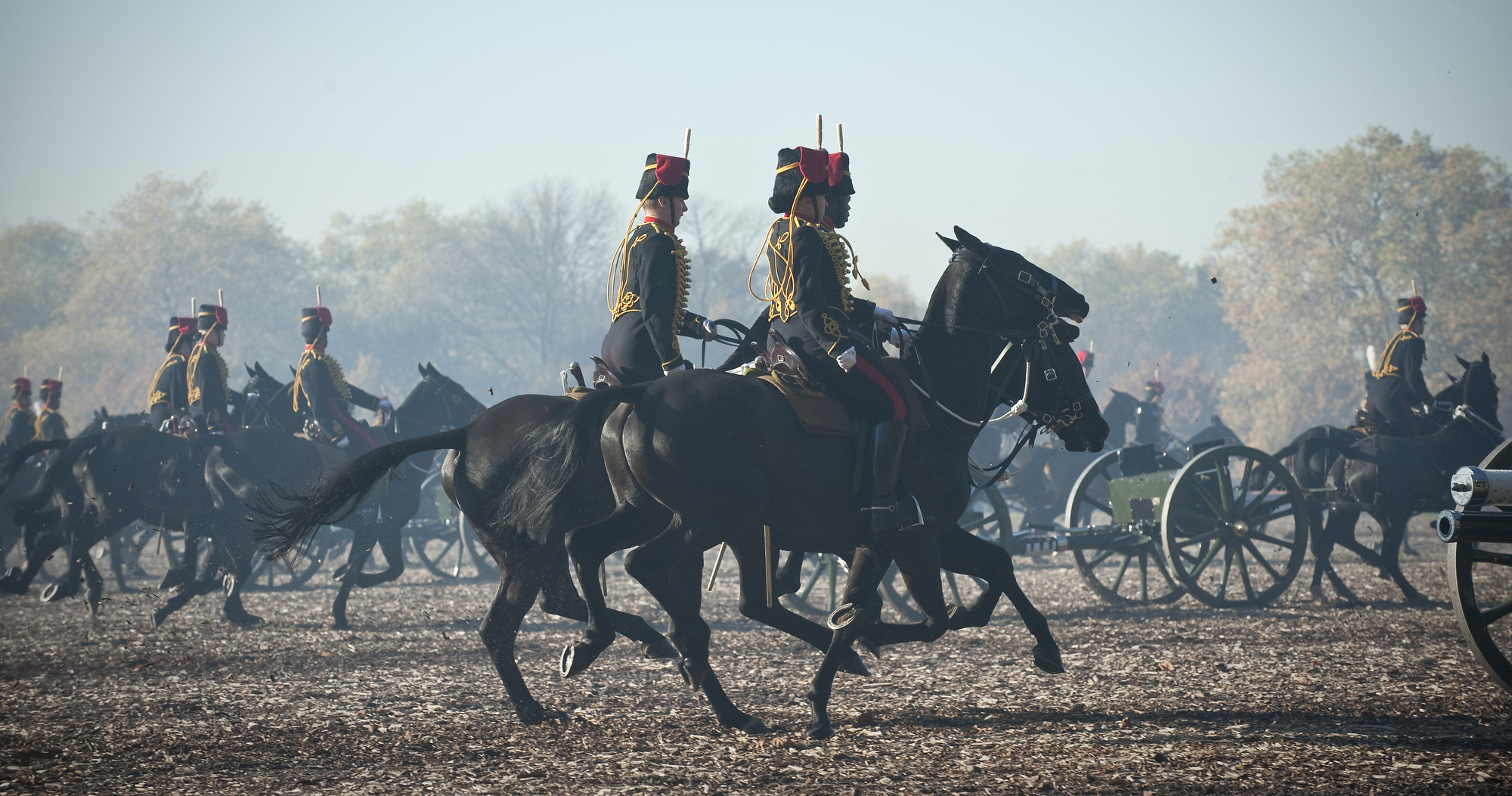
King's Troop, Royal Horse Artillery at a gun salute ceremony in 2012

Subsequently, the cavalry and horse artillery units were rearmed with tanks and self-propelled artillery. As with the cavalry, though, certain artillery units, for instance the Royal Horse Artillery, retain their old designations. Horse artillery was last used in a few units in World War II, including the Wehrmacht's cavalry divisions on the Eastern Front, the Italian "fast divisions" (e.g. in the Isbuscenskij charge), and the Imperial Japanese Army in the Malayan campaign. A form of riding artillery using heavy machine guns called tachankas were used by the Poles and Russians in World War I, the Russian Civil War, the German Invasion of Poland and the 1941 Battle of Moscow.

In the United Kingdom, the King's Troop, Royal Horse Artillery retains six traditional teams of six horses each and 13-pounder guns for ceremonial duties to this day. In the Netherlands, the Dutch Artillery branch also has a horse artillery battery for ceremonial duties, called the Gele Rijders (Yellow Riders), after their hussar-style uniforms with heavy yellow braiding.

== See also ==
- Royal Horse Artillery
- Royal Canadian Horse Artillery
- Fire support
- U.S. Horse Artillery Brigade
- Horses in warfare
- Horses in the Napoleonic Wars
- Zamburak

== Sources ==
- Clarke, Dale (2004). British Artillery 1914–1919: Field Army Artillery. Oxford: Osprey.
- Cotner, James R. (March 1996). "America's Civil War: Horses and Field Artillery". America's Civil War.
- Fowler, Jeffrey T. (2001). Axis Cavalry in World War II. Osprey. ISBN 9781841763231.
- Jowett, P.S. (2002). The Japanese Army 1931-45 (1): 1931-42. Osprey. ISBN 9781841763538.
- Markham, C. R. (1892). A History of Peru. C. H. Sergel. p. 431.
- Hedberg, Jonas, ed. (1987). Kungliga artilleriet: Det ridande artilleriet (in Swedish). Stockholm. ISBN 91-85266-39-6.
- Holmes, Richard, ed. (2001). The Oxford Companion to Military History. Oxford: Oxford University Press. ISBN 0-19-866209-2.
- Morgan, James (1990). "'Mounted But Not Mounted': The Confusing Terminology of Artillery". Camp Chase Gazette.
- Nofi, Albert A. (1993). The Waterloo Campaign: June 1815. Da Capo Press. ISBN 0-938289-98-5.
- Summerfield, Stephen (2011). "Summary of Gribeauval's Life". Smoothbore Ordnance Journal (2): 9–23. ISBN 978-1-907417-14-6.
