= Hibberts Corner, Maine =

Hibberts Corner is a village within the town of Washington in Knox County, Maine, United States. It is located at 44°18′15″N 69°24′26″W (44.3042402, -69.4072655), at an altitude of 354 feet (108 m).
