= Jennifer E. Glick =

American sociologist and social demographer

Academic background
- Education: BA, Sociology, 1991, Pennsylvania State University; MA, Sociology, 1993, PhD, Sociology, 1997, University of Texas at Austin
- Thesis: Changing household structure patterns in the Mexican origin population: life course, family survival strategy and cultural incorporation determinants (1997)

Jennifer Elyse Glick is an American sociologist and social demographer. She is the Arnold S. and Bette G. Hoffman Professor of Sociology at Pennsylvania State University. Her research focus is on immigrant adaptation and family survival strategies, leading her to co-publish a book in 2009 titled Achieving Anew: How New Immigrants Do in American Schools, Jobs and Neighborhoods.

== Early life and education ==
Glick earned her Bachelor of Arts degree in sociology from Pennsylvania State University before enrolling at the University of Texas at Austin for her master's degree and PhD. She then became a postdoctoral research associate and assistant research professor of sociology at Brown University.

== Career ==
Glick accepted an assistant professor of sociology position at Arizona State University (ASU) in 1999. She studied immigrant adaptation and family survival strategies. As a result, she was appointed ASU's Center for Population Dynamics's associate director and led a research team funded by the National Science Foundation to evaluate how social networks are affected by adverse policies and attitudes. In 2009, Glick received a $221,575 National Institutes of Health grant to study child development and immigrant adaptation. In the same year, she co-published her first book with Michael J. White titled Achieving Anew: How New Immigrants Do in American Schools, Jobs and Neighborhoods which won the American Sociological Association's Otis Dudley Duncan Book Award.

In 2016, Glick left ASU to become the Arnold S. and Bette G. Hoffman Professor in Sociology at Pennsylvania State University. The following year, she accepted a directorship position at Pennsylvania State University's Population Research Institute, taking over for interim director Michelle Frisco.

== Selected publications ==
- Achieving Anew: How New Immigrants Do in American Schools, Jobs and Neighborhoods (2009)
