= Washington, Maine =

Town in Maine, United States

- Town
- Town of Washington
- Flag Seal

- Location in Knox County and the state of Maine.
- Coordinates: 44°15′12″N 69°22′18″W
- Country: United States
- State: Maine
- County: Knox
- Settled: 1797
- Incorporated (town): February 27, 1811
- Villages: Washington; Globe; Hibberts Corner; Razorville; Stickney Corner; West Washington

Area
  - Total: 39.20 sq mi (101.53 km^{2})
  - Land: 38.04 sq mi (98.52 km^{2})
  - Water: 1.16 sq mi (3.00 km^{2})
- Elevation: 331 ft (101 m)

Population (2020)
  - Total: 1,590
  - Density: 42/sq mi (16.1/km^{2})
- Time zone: UTC-5 (Eastern (EST))
  - Summer (DST): UTC-4 (EDT)
- ZIP code: 04574
- Area code: 207
- FIPS code: 23-80425
- GNIS feature ID: 582792
- Website: www.washington.maine.gov

Washington, officially the Town of Washington, is a town in Knox County, Maine, United States. The population was 1,590 at the 2020 United States census.

== History ==
Washington, Maine, was first settled in 1797 by the Nelson family. At that time it was known as Putnam, named after General Israel Putnam, a war hero. It was officially renamed Washington in 1825. One early item of interest in Washington's history was the "paint mine". There was a large deposit of red and yellow ocher in a nearby cave, which may have been used by people who lived here three to five thousand years ago and who used large quantities of ocher, normally red, to cover both the bodies of the dead and the burial artifacts. Archaeologists refer to these people as "Red Paint People". The red panel at the hoist of the Official Town Flag refers to these people.

== Geography ==
According to the United States Census Bureau, the town has a total area of 39.20 square miles (101.53 km^{2}), of which 38.04 square miles (98.52 km^{2}) is land and 1.16 square miles (3.00 km^{2}) is water.

== Demographics ==
Historical population
Census	Pop.	Note	%±
1790	620		—
1830	1,135		—
1840	1,600		41.0%
1850	1,756		9.8%
1860	1,662		−5.4%
1870	1,276		−23.2%
1880	1,249		−2.1%
1890	1,230		−1.5%
1900	1,019		−17.2%
1910	814		−20.1%
1920	660		−18.9%
1930	615		−6.8%
1940	689		12.0%
1950	722		4.8%
1960	636		−11.9%
1970	723		13.7%
1980	954		32.0%
1990	1,185		24.2%
2000	1,345		13.5%
2010	1,527		13.5%
2020	1,590		4.1%
U.S. Decennial Census

=== 2010 census ===
As of the census of 2010, there were 1,527 people, 614 households, and 427 families living in the town. The population density was 40.1 inhabitants per square mile (15.5/km^{2}). There were 797 housing units at an average density of 21.0 per square mile (8.1/km^{2}). The ethnic makeup of the town was 96.9% White, 0.4% African American, 0.6% Native American, 0.1% Asian, 0.1% from other races, and 1.9% from two or more races. Hispanic or Latino of any race were 0.4% of the population.

There were 614 households, of which 28.5% had children under the age of 18 living with them, 56.0% were married couples living together, 7.0% had a female householder with no husband present, 6.5% had a male householder with no wife present, and 30.5% were non-families. 23.8% of all households were made up of individuals, and 9.1% had someone living alone who was 65 years of age or older. The average household size was 2.43 and the average family size was 2.83.

The median age in the town was 43.9 years. 20.4% of residents were under the age of 18; 6.5% were between the ages of 18 and 24; 24.3% were from 25 to 44; 33.3% were from 45 to 64; and 15.5% were 65 years of age or older. The gender makeup of the town was 51.9% male and 48.1% female.

=== 2000 census ===
As of the census of 2000, there were 1,345 people, 518 households, and 361 families living in the town. The population density was 35.4 inhabitants per square mile (13.7/km^{2}). There were 694 housing units at an average density of 18.3 per square mile (7.1/km^{2}). The ethnic makeup of the town was 98.81% White, 0.07% Native American, 0.07% from other races, and 1.04% from two or more races. Hispanic or Latino of any race were 0.37% of the population.

There were 518 households, out of which 32.0% had children under the age of 18 living with them, 57.7% were married couples living together, 8.3% had a female householder with no husband present, and 30.3% were non-families. 22.2% of all households were made up of individuals, and 6.9% had someone living alone who was 65 years of age or older. The average household size was 2.54 and the average family size was 2.96.

In the town, the population was spread out, with 23.8% under the age of 18, 6.5% from 18 to 24, 29.3% from 25 to 44, 29.5% from 45 to 64, and 10.9% who were 65 years of age or older. The median age was 40 years. For every 100 females, there were 104.4 males. For every 100 females age 18 and over, there were 102.2 males.

The median income for a household in the town was $35,492, and the median income for a family was $40,486. Males had a median income of $29,375 versus $21,136 for females. The per capita income for the town was $15,488. About 8.8% of families and 13.4% of the population were below the poverty line, including 16.2% of those under age 18 and 9.0% of those age 65 or over.

== Education ==
Regional School Unit 40 operates public schools. Prescott Memorial School is in Washington.

Medomak Valley Middle School and Medomak Valley High School are in nearby Waldoboro.

Gibbs Library is in Washington.

== Notable people ==
- Alonzo Bowman, Medal of Honor recipient
- Elmer McCurdy, an outlaw born in the town in 1880
- Clyde Sukeforth, Major League Baseball catcher, coach, scout, and manager
- Frances Hodges White, children's author
