= François Blanc (disambiguation) =

François Blanc (1806–1877) was a majority stockholder and operator of the Monte Carlo Casino.

François Blanc may also refer to:

- François blanc (grape variety), a white French wine grape variety

== See also ==
- Francis White (disambiguation)
- Francis Blanche (1921–1974), French actor, singer, humorist and author
