= Wallace Goldsmith =

American cartoonist

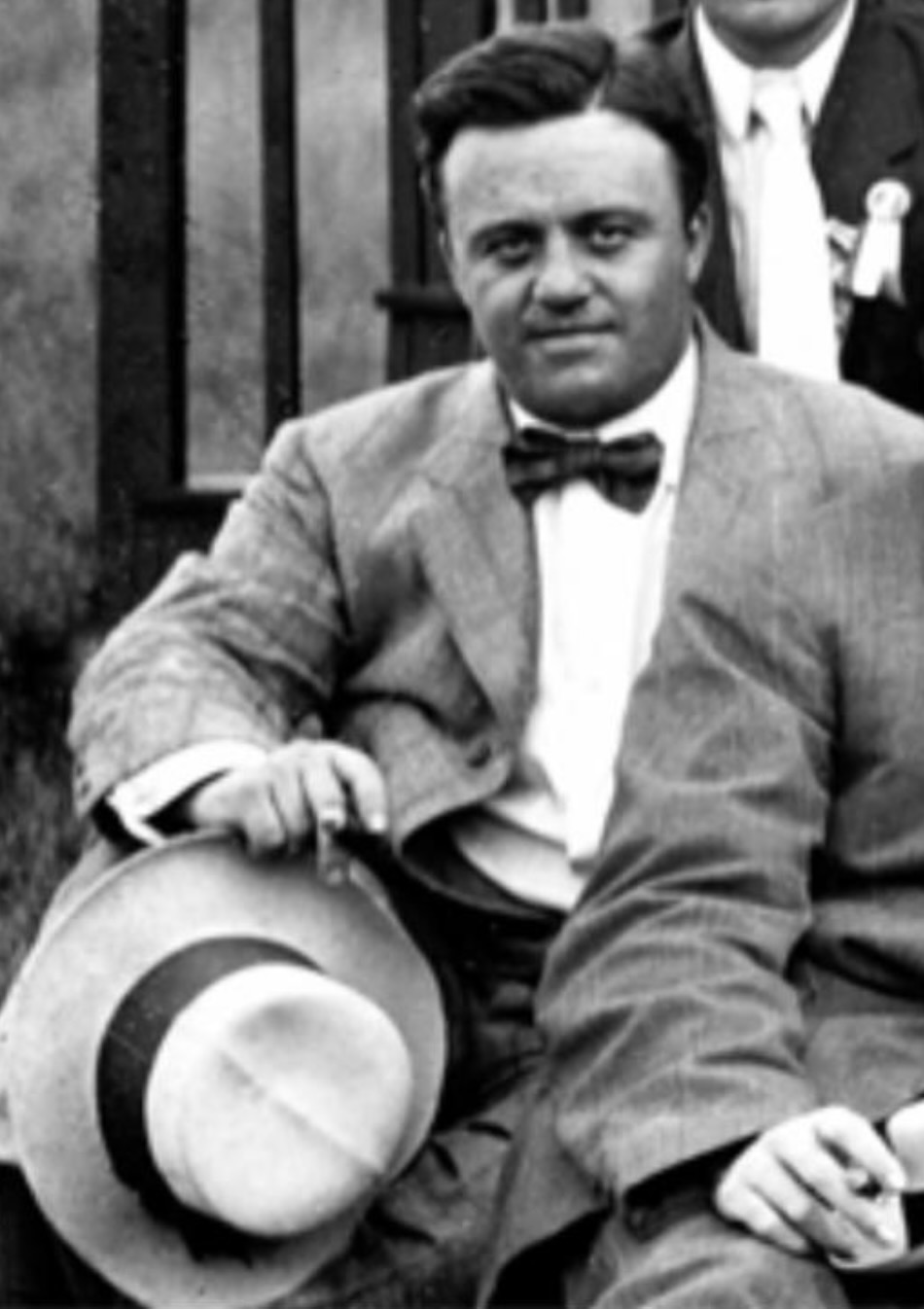
- Goldsmith in 1908
- Born: Wallace Heard Goldsmith; September 1, 1873; Cleveland, Ohio, US
- Died: 31 March 1945 (aged 71); Bedford, Massachusetts
- Occupation(s): Illustrator, cartoonist
- Spouse: Georgianna Bell Carpenter
- Children: 2

Signature
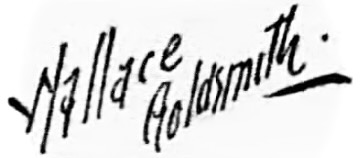

Wallace Goldsmith (September 1, 1873 – March 31, 1945), was an American cartoonist, illustrator, and former sports cartoonist, best known for his editorial cartoons covering Boston city politics, sports, and national issues. He worked twenty-five-years as a cartoonist with The Boston Post. Goldsmith is recognized for his book illustrations, including The Canterville Ghost (1906) by Oscar Wilde, Eliza (1900) by Barry Pain, and Darius Green, His Flying Machine (1910) by John Townsend Trowbridge.

== Early life ==
Goldsmith was born in Cleveland, Ohio, on September 1, 1873. He was the son of Delos E. Goldsmith and Anna Barbara Stenner. His father, a government dispatch rider, helped build the pioneer trails to California. He was the grandson of architect Jonathan Gillett Goldsmith, the first architect and designer in the Ohio Military Reserve. His brother, Delos E. Goldsmith Jr., held a position of real estate editor at The Boston Globe, was in a air balloon that landed in Dorchester Bay where two passengers drowned, and was in a duel with swords with John Crowley, a Boston lawyer. He died on August 2, 1900 at the age of 29. His sister was Lucia Augusta Goldsmith. Goldsmith married Georgia I. Carpenter on April 19, 1899 in Melrose, Massachusetts.

== Career ==
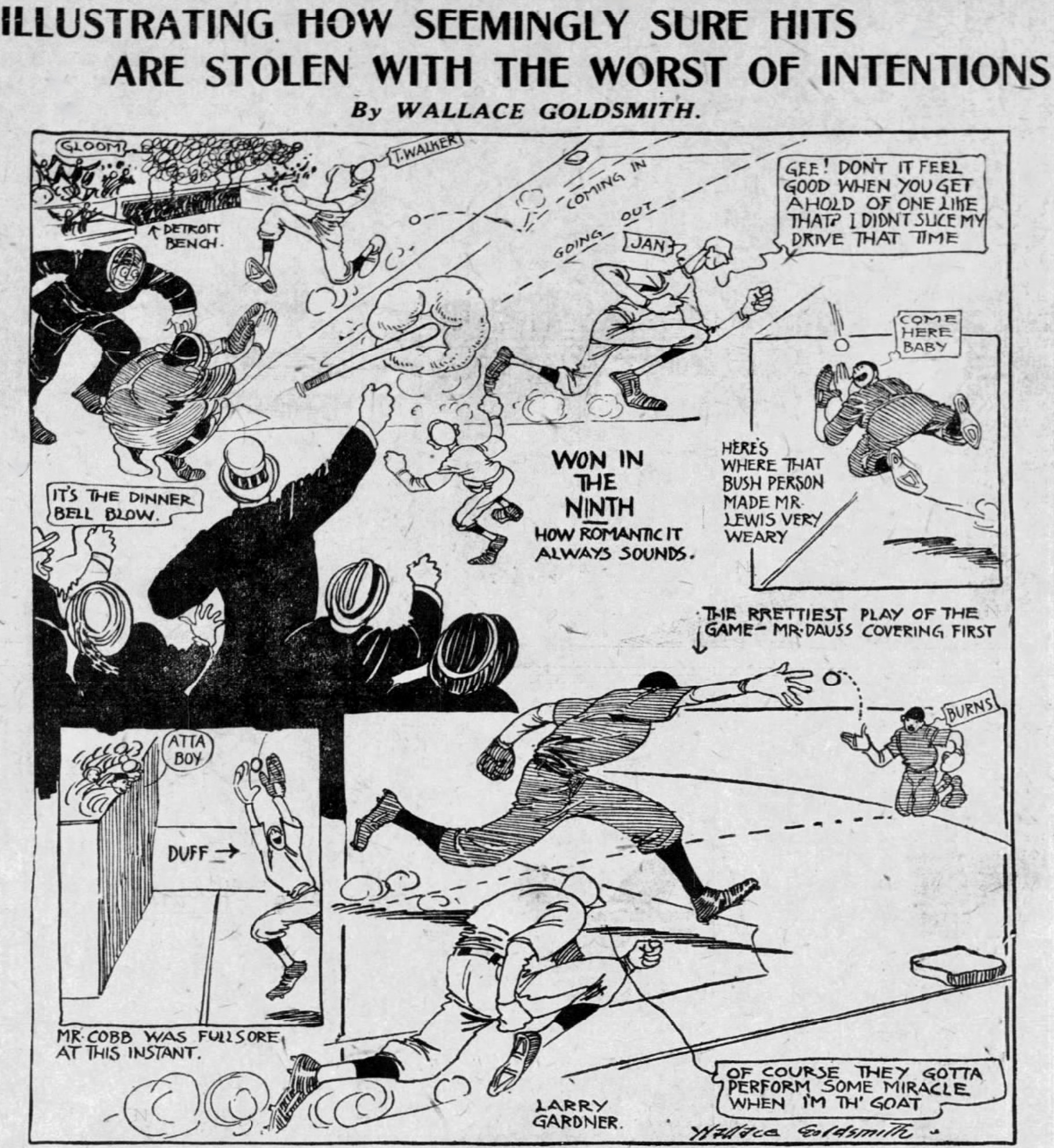
May 23, 1916 cartoon for a Win for the Boston Red Sox.

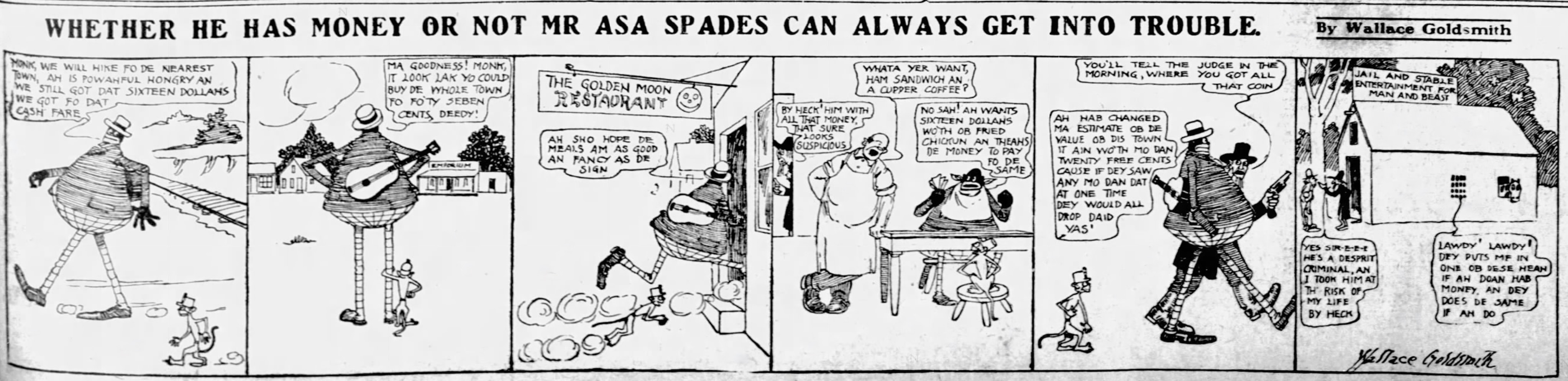
Mr. Asa Spades Goldsmith cartoon strip ran from 1908 to 1918.

Goldsmith worked for The Boston Post as a sports cartoonist for 25 years. He also worked for the Boston Herald, The Boston Journal, and the Worcester Telegram. Additionally, he worked for the Boston Globe from 1909 to 1919. In addition to his sports-related work, Goldsmith crafted editorial cartoons covering Boston city politics and tackled national issues, including the women's suffrage movement and President Woodrow Wilson's foreign policies.

The popularity of Goldsmith's political cartoons led him to vaudeville, as he appeared onstage for a two week run as a headliner in the B.F. Keith summer show of 1908. Billed as "one of Boston's popular cartoonists", Goldsmith appeared onstage sketching caricatures of notable figures, including William Howard Taft and William Jennings Bryan. Goldsmith had previously illustrated a publicity pamphlet for the Keith's Theatre, The Keith ABC for Children, before emerging as a performer.

On August 12, 1908, John Irwin, who owned the Sweet Dream Hotel on Peddocks Island in Boston, invited Boston baseball men, including Goldsmith, to a day filled with baseball-related activities. The gathering also included sports writer Tim Murnane from the Boston Globe, and writer Sam Crane a former second baseman, representing the New York Journal.

In 1910, Goldsmith started a comic strip featuring the central character, Mr. Asa Spades, an inept African American individual entangled in adventures tied to contemporary events. Although this creation would unquestionably face challenges in today's publishing climate, a 1910 advertisement promoted it as a cartoon "recommended for reading by every individual, regardless of age or gender, in New England." Another comic strip went by the name The Adventures of Little Allright, which appeared in the comic section of The Sunday Herald from March 6 to June 26, 1904. The strip underwent a reboot, becoming Little Alright (with the second 'L' omitted), and ran from November 11, 1906 to April 14, 1907.

Goldsmith's primary emphasis was on covering the Boston Red Sox and Boston Braves. He accompanied the Red Sox to their spring training locations in Hot Springs, Arkansas, and Redondo Beach, California, where he delivered daily reports on their training sessions. Throughout the baseball season, his cartoons served as reviews of the games played the previous day, focusing on the team playing in Boston.

Goldsmith was among the corps of writers providing coverage of the World Series games. The Boston Globe summarized his role as: "The Globe's own cartoonist will attend every game in the series, and no bit of humor will escape his eye. When he draws a likeness of Jake Stahl-you will know it's Jake, and so it will be with the other warriors, who will be caught in characteristic attitudes truer to life than would be possible in any photograph. Goldsmith will see the crucial plays in every game and will picture them in his graphic in a funny way."

In 1912, Goldsmith did a series of Theodore Roosevelt-related comic strips with The Boston Globe. The comic strips, each bearing Goldsmith's signature in the lower right corner, have their titles penciled in the upper border. The titles, accompanied by brief summaries of the comic strips, such as: In Africa He Finds Literature a Telling Weapon; As President He Discovers 'Peace Hath Its Victories; and He Visited the Crowned Heads of Europe.

According to Ed Bracket of The National Pastime, Goldsmith produced his best work from 1914 to 1916. "The main element of Goldsmith cartoon is his use of humor and sarcasm, especially when used to show the ineptitude of the opposing team." While the battles of World War I were being fought in Europe, Goldsmith often integrated a war theme into his work. There was often a complete lack of political correctness and portrayals of acceptable stereotypes. There are many humiliating representations of Native Americans. When the Boston Braves won, they were shown as Indians on the warpath, shooting arrows at a foe or wielding knives and tomahawks. When they lost, they were the poor souls who have been relocated to a reservation, bent over a campfire with an empty pot hanging over it.

Goldsmith was not only a writer but also an illustrator. He did various works, including creating the illustrations for Aunt Nabby's Children, (1902) a work by the writer Frances Hodges White. Additionally, he crafted the illustrations for The Canterville Ghost, (1906), a short story by the Irish poet and playwright Oscar Wilde. In 1908, as illustrator at the Boston Herald, Goldsmith illustrated the book The Belle Islers (1908) by Richard Brinsley Newman.

== Death ==
Goldsmith died at his home on March 31, 1945 in Bedford, Massachusetts. Funeral services were held at the Marshall Memorial Chapel in Massachusetts. Burial was in the Mt. Auburn Cemetery, Cambridge, Massachusetts.

== See also ==
- List of American comics creators
