= Attorney General White =

Attorney General White may refer to:

- John White (Frontenac County) (1760s–1800), Attorney General of Upper Canada
- Mark White (Texas politician) (1940–2017), Attorney General of Texas
- Robert White (attorney general) (1833–1915), Attorney General of West Virginia

== See also ==
- William Pinkney Whyte (1824–1908), Attorney General of Maryland
- General White (disambiguation)
