= The Canterville Ghost =

1887 short story by Oscar Wilde

- Short story by Oscar Wilde
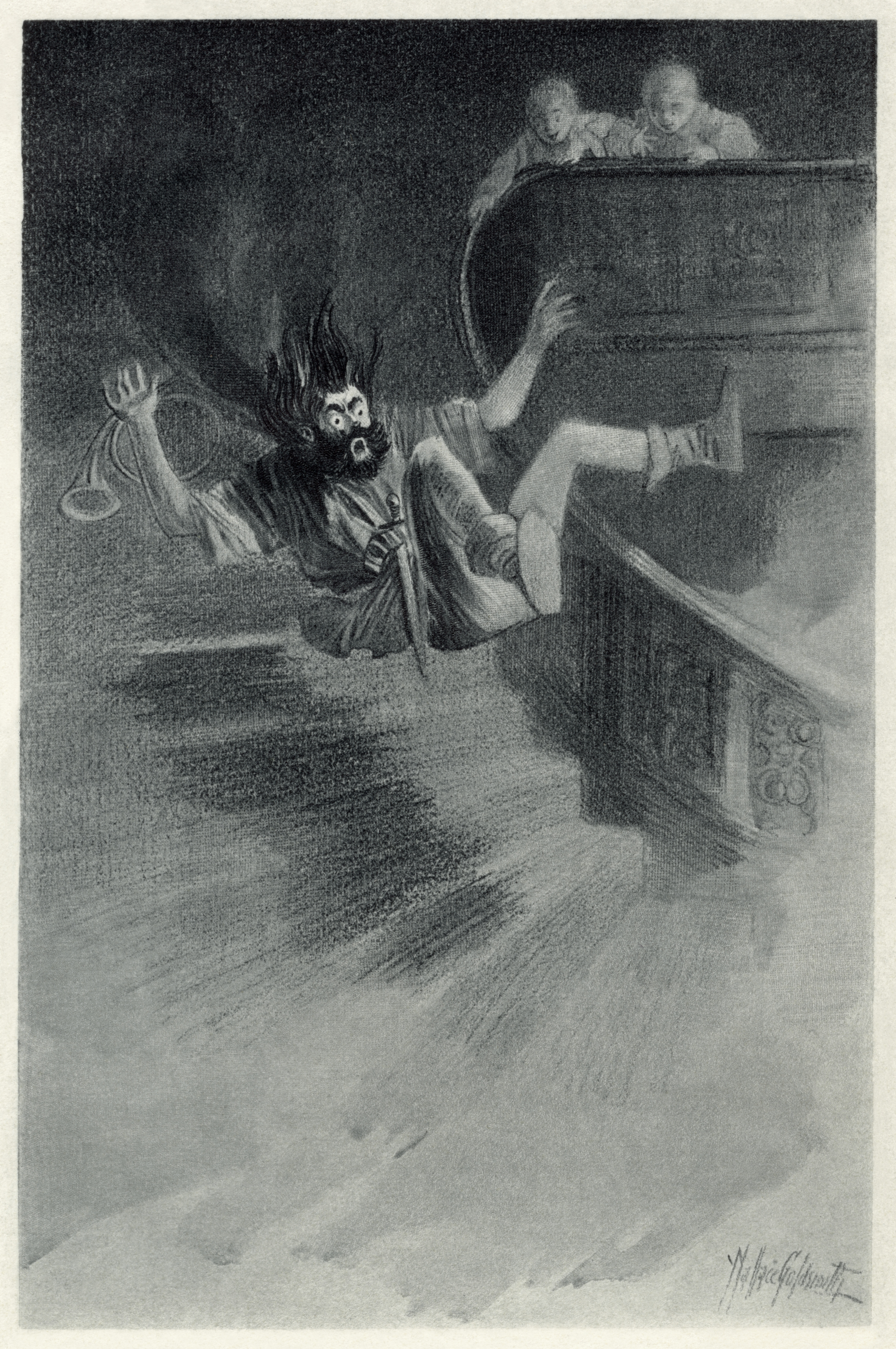
- "He met with a severe fall" – illustration by Wallace Goldsmith of the effects of a butter slide set up by the twins as part of their campaign of practical jokes against the ghost.
- Country: Ireland
- Language: English
- Genres: Fantasy; Gothic; horror; humour

Publication
- Media type: Print (hardback and paperback)

"The Canterville Ghost" is a horror comedy short story by Oscar Wilde. It was the first of Wilde's stories to be published, appearing in two parts as "The Canterville Ghost – A Hylo-Idealistic Romance: The Redemptive Heroine", in The Court and Society Review, 23 February and 2 March 1887. It later appeared in the short story collection Lord Arthur Savile's Crime and Other Stories, published in July 1891. The story details an American family, who moves to a castle haunted by the ghost of a dead English nobleman, trapped for killing his wife, then later being walled in and starved to death by his wife's brothers.

The short story has been adapted for the stage and screen numerous times, one of the most notable the loosely-based 1944 MGM film of the same name.

== Summary ==
The American Minister to the Court of St James's, Hiram B. Otis, and his family move into Canterville Castle, an English country house, despite warnings from Lord Canterville that the house is haunted. Mr. Otis says that he will take the furniture as well as the ghost at valuation.

The Otis family includes Mr. and Mrs. Otis, their eldest son Washington, their daughter Virginia and the Otis twins. At first, none of the Otis family believes in ghosts but shortly after they move in, none of them can deny the presence of Sir Simon de Canterville. Mrs. Otis notices a mysterious bloodstain on the floor and comments that "She does not at all care for bloodstains in the living room", Mrs. Umney, the housekeeper, tells her that the bloodstain is evidence of the ghost and cannot be removed. Washington Otis, the eldest son, suggests that the stain will be removed with Pinkerton's Champion Stain Remover and Paragon Detergent. When the ghost makes his first appearance, Mr. Otis promptly gets out of bed and pragmatically offers the ghost Tammany Rising Sun Lubricator to oil his chains. Angrily, the ghost throws the bottle and runs into the corridor.

The Otis twins throw pillows on him and the ghost flees. The Otis family witnesses reappearing bloodstains on the floor just by the fireplace, which are removed every time they appear in various colours. Despite the ghost's efforts and most gruesome guises, the family refuses to be frightened, leaving Sir Simon feeling increasingly helpless and humiliated. The Otises remain unconcerned. The ghost falls victim to tripwires, toy peashooters, butter slides and falling buckets of water. The mischievous twins rig up their own "ghost", which frightens him. Sir Simon sees that Virginia, the beautiful and wise fifteen-year-old daughter, is different from the rest of the family. He tells her that he has not slept in three hundred years and wants desperately to do so.

The ghost tells her the tragic tale of his wife, Lady Eleanor de Canterville, and his terrible mistake. Virginia listens to him and learns an important lesson, as well as the true meaning behind a riddle. Sir Simon de Canterville says that she must weep for him, for he has no tears; she must pray for him, for he has no faith and then she must accompany him to the Angel of Death and beg for Sir Simon's death. She does weep for him and pray for him and disappears with Sir Simon through the wainscoting, accompanying him to the Garden of Death, bidding the ghost farewell.

The story ends with Virginia marrying the Duke of Cheshire after they both come of age. Sir Simon, she tells her husband several years later, helped her understand what life is, what death signifies and why love is stronger than both.

== Reception ==
=== 19th century ===
A. S. Harvey praises the story in "'Lady Windermere's Fan' & the further Teaching of Oscar Wilde" for The Ludgate Monthly in 1892, writing, "The humor of the professional funny man is a different kind of humour altogether to the quaint fun of 'The Canterville Ghost,' ... It makes you scream again, when you imagined it was serious for a moment, and finishes up with the sweetest little touch of pathos imaginable" (p. 260).

William Sharp writes for The Academy in 1891 that "much the same kind of thing has already been far better done by Mr. Andrew Lang; but it is disfigured by some stupid vulgarisms". He criticizes Wilde's rude and stereotyping portrayal of Americans, concluding, "It is the perpetration of banalities of this kind which disgusts Englishmen as well as 'cultured Americans'. One should not judge the society of a nation by that of a parish; the company of the elect by the sinners of one's own acquaintance" (p. 194).

A critic in Saturday Review of Politics, Literature, Science and Art writes in 1891 that both "Lord Arthur Savile's Crime" and "The Canterville Ghost" have "abundance of humour, if not of novelty", and "an impression that the idea is much better than the treatment of it", due to inconsistency in tone and abrupt style changes. They state that the story is spoiled by the character of the ghost, "who is neither one thing nor the other, neither flesh nor spirit", and that the ending is "absurdly incongruous and out of place" (p. 226).

=== 20th century ===
Philip K. Cohen writes in "Marriages and Murders: 'Lord Arthur Savile's Crime' and 'The Canterville Ghost'", in The Moral Vision of Oscar Wilde (1978), that the story shows the misery of a double life and features an "unmasking" – a common feature in Wilde's works – that reveals the suffering of the "anguished sinner", who seeks "the peace that forgiveness brings". Cohen explains the title as expressing the conflict between materialism and idealism, explaining that the Hylo-Idealisists – a small group that emerged in England in the 1870s and 1880s – stood for atheism, so the juxtaposition with the Christian elements of the story aligns with the title "when one interprets its hyphen as an indicator of opposition; Wilde continually stresses the conflict between materialism, represented by the combining form hylo-, and Christian idealism. In this philosophical romance, the idealists overcome obstacles set up by the hylists". Cohen also writes that "The Canterville Ghost" shows Wilde testing the fairy-tale genre, which he wrote more in later.

Lydia Reineck Wilburn writes in "Oscar Wilde's 'The Canterville Ghost': The Power of an Audience" (1987) that the story shows Wilde grappling with questions about the function of audience, like how important the audience is and should be to an artist. In "Oscar Wilde and the Semantic Mechanisms of Humour: The Satire of Social Habits" (1994), Mariano Baselga writes that Wilde criticizes upper class sensibilities in this story, explaining, "the main targets of the ghost's troublemaking are systematically the members of the upper class and/or the people, actions, common vices and symbols associated to them. The Dowager Duchess with all the vanity of her best lace-and-diamond attire, the fussy housemaids (whom we imagine frilly, shrill-voiced and pink-faced), a priest, the greedy card-sharper Lord Canterville are the helpless victims of a ghost who is apparently trying to emulate Robin Hood in his own way."

=== 21st century ===
Michèle Mendelssohn asserts that the story comments on the English and American cultures through contrasting "American pragmatism and artistocratic English superstitions", (p. 167) "science versus belief, realism versus gothic conventions, and the natural versus the supernatural", (168) and how Virginia saving the day may suggest that American men are weak and shirking their responsibilities in "Notes on Oscar Wilde's Transatlantic Gender Politics" (2012). Nick Freeman writes in "The Victorian Ghost Story" in The Victorian Gothic: An Edinburgh Companion (2012) that "by the late 1880s ... the type of ghost story which had brought pleasant frissons to earlier Victorian readers had become stale and was falling victim to parodists", but that "Wilde somehow combined witty parody with an affecting friendship between the ghost of Sir Simon de Canterville and Virginia Otis" (p. 100).

Jarlath Killeen writes in "Braindead: Locating the Gothic" in The Emergence of Irish Gothic Fiction: History, Origins, Theories (2014) that "the Gothic is reduced to a mechanical and hammy piece of amateur theatrics needing to be put out of its misery by the virginal innocent usually terrorised within it" (p. 55) in the story. Christopher S. Nassaar writes in "Oscar Wilde and the (Attempted) Murder of Conscience" (2014) that the ghost and the twins have no conscious, but that the conscience intervenes in the form of Virginia. She saves the day, but "spoils the fun"; the first part of the story when hijinks ensue is more entertaining (p. 4).

Benjamin Morgan states that Wilde satirised the "bland commercialism" (677) Americans included as part of their national identity (p. 685) in "Oscar Wilde's Un-American Tour: Aestheticism, Mormonism, and Transnational Resonance" (2014). Kimberly Lutz cites Cohen and Wilburn in "Serious Comedy? Finding Meaning in 'The Canterville Ghost'" (2009), adding that death is depicted as a "deserved rest" for "the exhausted actor". Lutz also writes that "'The Canterville Ghost" parodies actors, dandies, American materialism, aristocratic excess, ghost stories, and Gothic conventions", and describes the comic theme of "the farcical result of the American/British culture clash".

== Adaptations ==
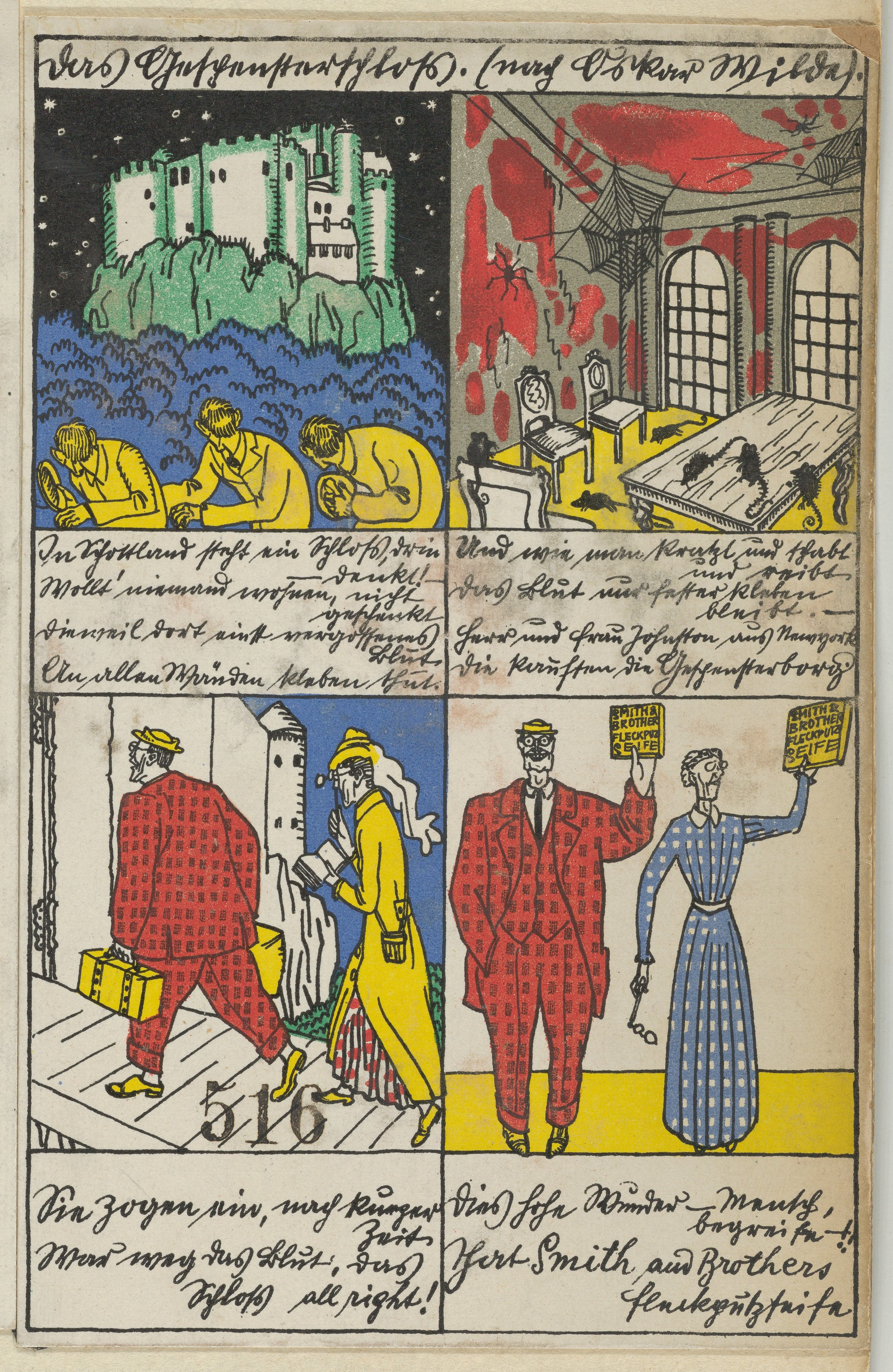
The Ghost Castle (after Oscar Wilde), or Das Gespensterschloß (nach Oskar Wilde), MET DP848994

=== Theatrical films ===
- The Canterville Ghost, a 1944 Hollywood movie with Charles Laughton in the title role.
- Bhoothnath, a 2008 Bollywood movie adaptation.
- The Canterville Ghost, (Le Fantôme de Canterville) a 2016 French-Belgian film.
- The Canterville Ghost, a British animated feature film with the voices of Stephen Fry, Hugh Laurie, and Miranda Hart, originally intended for release in 2016. and was released on 22 September 2023.

=== On television ===
According to the AFI Catalog of Feature Films, "Among the many other adaptations of Oscar Wilde's story are the following television versions, all titled The Canterville Ghost":

- 28 September 1949, on ABC network, directed by Fred Carr and starring Wendy Barrie and Edward Ashley.
- 20 November 1950, on NBC network's Robert Montgomery Presents Your Lucky Strike Theatre, starring Cecil Parker and Margaret O'Brien.
- 12 April 1951, on the Du Mont network, directed by Frank Wisbar, starring Lois Hall, Reginald Sheffield and Bruce Lester.
- May 1953, Ziv TV's syndicated version, directed by Sobey Martin, starring John Qualen and Connie Marshall.
- 9 November 1966, The Canterville Ghost, a 1966 ABC television musical that aired 2 November and featured Douglas Fairbanks, Jr., and Michael Redgrave. Featured songs by Fiddler on the Roof songwriters Jerry Bock and Sheldon Harnick.
- In 1970, Soviet animation studio Soyuzmultfilm released an animated short directed by Valentina and Zinaida Brumberg in the USSR.
- On 27 January 1996, a movie, The Canterville Ghost aired on ABC, starring Patrick Stewart and Neve Campbell.
- On 31 October 2021 a BYUtv and BBC series titled The Canterville Ghost premiered.

In addition to the AFI list are the following:

- Duch z Canterville, a Polish made-for-TV short comedy film, aired on 31 May 1968, starring Czesław Wołłejko and Anna Nehrebecka.
- The Canterville Ghost (1974), a made-for-TV film starring David Niven. It aired on 10 March 1975 in the United States; it also aired in West Germany and France.
- The Canterville Ghost, a 1985 television film starring Richard Kiley, on PBS.
- The Canterville Ghost (1986), made-for-TV, starring Alyssa Milano.
- Episode 7 of the first series of the British anthology program Mystery and Imagination, which aired 12 March 1966 and featured Bruce Forsyth as the ghost and a cast including David Buck, David Bauer, Eleanor Bron, Libby Morris and Angela Thorne. The episode was wiped after broadcast but audio-only recordings have survived.
- The Canterville Ghost, an animated 22-minute made-for-TV special originally shown as a Halloween special on the USA Network.
- Featured on Classic fairy tales from around the world : featuring the tales of Hans Christian Andersen, 1996
