= Francis White =

Francis White may refer to:

== Politics ==
- Francis White (soldier) (died 1657), English soldier and politician who sat in the House of Commons in 1656
- Francis White (Virginia politician) (1761–1826), U.S. Representative from Virginia
- Francis White (diplomat) (1892–1961), U.S. ambassador to Czechoslovakia, Mexico and Sweden

== Other ==
- Francis White (bishop) (c. 1564–1638), English bishop
- Francis White (surgeon) (1787–1859), president of the Royal College of Surgeons in Ireland
- Francis Le Grix White (1819–1887), British geologist
- Francis Buchanan White (1842–1894), Scottish entomologist
- Eg White (Francis White, born 1966), British musician, songwriter and producer

== See also ==
- Frank White (disambiguation)
- Frances White (disambiguation)
- François Blanc (disambiguation)
