= Michael White (British Army officer) =

Officer of the East India Company's Bengal Army

Lieutenant-General Sir Michael White KCB
- Born: 1791; St Michael's Mount, Cornwall
- Died: 27 January 1868 (aged 76–77); Bayswater, London
- Spouse: Mary Mylne
- Military career
- Allegiance: (Kingdom of Great Britain) Great Britain
- Branch: British Army
- Service years: 1804-1868
- Rank: Lieutenant-General
- Unit: 24th Light Dragoons
- Commands: 3rd Light Dragoons (1839-1854)
- Conflicts: Siege of Hathras (1817); Third Anglo-Maratha War (1817-18); Siege of Bharatpur (1825-26); First Anglo-Afghan War (1842); First Anglo-Sikh War (1845-46); Second Anglo-Sikh War (1848-49)

Lieutenant-General Sir Michael White KCB (1791 – 27 January 1868) was a British Army officer. The son of a major in the 27th Dragoons, he received a commission in the same regiment (since retitled the 24th Light Dragoons) in 1804. White served in India on the Sikh frontier; during the 1817 Siege of Hathras; the 1817–18 Third Anglo-Maratha War and the 1825-26 Siege of Bharatpur. From 1839 he commanded the 3rd Light Dragoons and led them in the 1842 invasion of Afghanistan for which he was appointed a Companion of the Order of the Bath.

White served as a brigade commander in the 1845-46 First Anglo-Sikh War. At the Battle of Mudki he turned the Sikh flank and silenced their artillery. On the first day of the Battle of Ferozeshah he led a cavalry charge that George Bruce described as having "probably saved the day" for the British. The second day he led another charge that prevented Sikh cavalry from charging British infantry in a precarious condition. Despite being wounded he continued to campaign and his gallant service at the Battle of Sobraon was rewarded by appointment as aide-de-camp to Queen Victoria.

White also served in the Second Anglo-Sikh War of 1848-49. He took command of the 14th Light Dragoons at the Battle of Ramnagar after the death of their commanding officer and led another cavalry charge. He also served at the battles of Chillianwala and Gujrat. White was promoted to major-general in 1854 and to lieutenant-general in 1860. He was appointed a Knight Commander of the Order of the Bath in 1862.

== Early life and career as a junior officer ==
Michael White was the third son of Major Robert White of the 27th Dragoons and Ann White, daughter of Sir John St Aubyn, 4th Baronet. He was born at St Michael's Mount, Cornwall, his mother's family seat, in 1791. White was educated at Westminster School, London.

White was commissioned as a cornet in his father's regiment, which had been renamed the 24th Light Dragoons in 1803, on 15 August 1804. He was promoted to lieutenant on 14 May 1805 and served in 1809 on the Sutlej, the river forming the boundary between British India and the Sikh Empire. White was promoted to captain on 7 November 1815 and in 1817 served at the Siege of Hathras. He went on to serve in the Third Anglo-Maratha War of 1817-18 and the 1825-26 Siege of Bharatpur, for which he received a medal. He married Mary Mylne, the daughter of a major in his regiment, in 1816.

== Field officer ==
White was promoted to major on 10 January 1837 and to lieutenant-colonel (in the 3rd Light Dragoons) on 13 December 1839. White was given command of the cavalry attached to Sir George Pollock's army during the 1842 invasion of Afghanistan. White's troops helped to force the Khyber Pass, take the heights of Jagdalak, defeat an Afghan force at Tezin and capture Haft Kotal. His men were also part of the British garrison at Kabul. Despite the eventual British loss and withdrawal White was recommended for appointment as a Companion of the Order of the Bath, which was granted in 1843, for his services in the war and also received a medal.

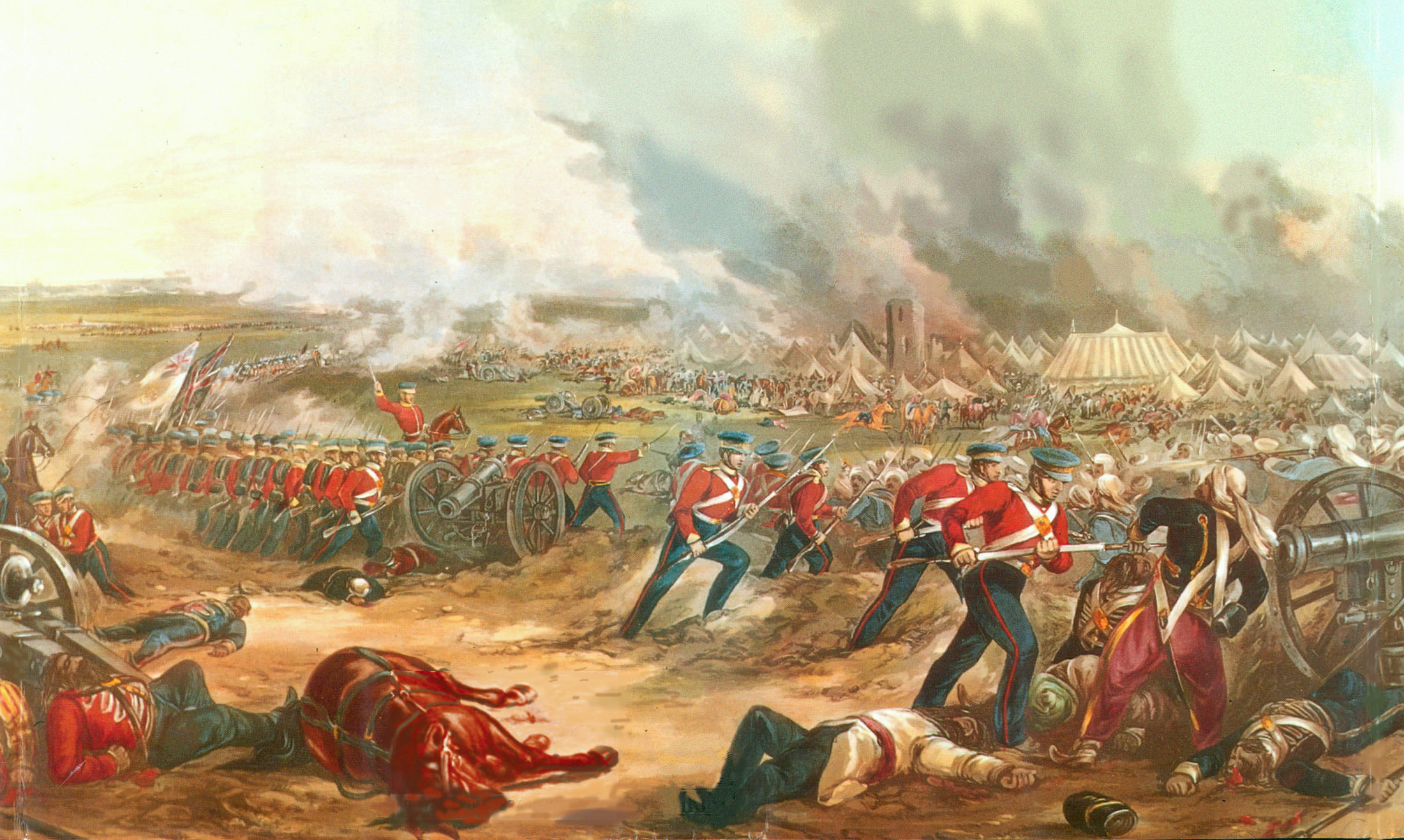
Battle of Ferozshah (2nd Day), 22 December 1845 by Henry Martens, after a sketch on the spot by Major George Francis White, 31st Foot

White served under Hugh Gough in the First Anglo-Sikh War (1845–46), commanding the cavalry of the British force. At the 18 December 1845 Battle of Mudki White led the cavalry on a flanking movement that turned the Sikh left, put their cavalry to flight and silenced their artillery. During this action the British cavalry suffered heavy casualties and White's horse was wounded. White commanded a cavalry brigade at the 21–22 December Battle of Ferozeshah. On the first day of the battle he led a charge by the 3rd Light Dragoons against a large Sikh cavalry force that threatened to throw back Walter Gilbert's infantry from entrenched positions recently captured from the Sikh forces. Despite heavy musket and artillery fire White's cavalry succeeded in routing the enemy force. He pushed on to the next line of Sikh defences but was repulsed. Historian George Bruce calls this "A brilliant and victorious charge [that] probably saved the day" for the British. On the second day of the battle White led another charge against the Sikh cavalry, who threatened the British infantry who were desperately short of ammunition. The 3rd Light Dragoons and two native cavalry regiments hit the Sikhs when they were only 200 yards (180 m) from the British infantry. Despite superior numbers the Sikh cavalry retired after fierce hand-to-hand combat. During the battle White's horse was killed and he was wounded.

On 29 January the Governor-General of India Henry Hardinge stated: "Colonel White, your regiment is an honour to the British army". White afterwards led the 3rd Light Dragoons in the final battle of the campaign, the 10 February 1846 Battle of Sobraon. Hardinge afterwards noted "Her Majesty's Third Light Dragoons, as usual, were in the foremost ranks, and distinguished themselves under their commanding officer, Lieut.-Colonel White". For gallantry in this action White was nominated an aide-de-camp to Queen Victoria. He received the Sutlej Medal with two additional clasps for his service and was promoted to colonel on 1 April 1846.

White commanded another cavalry brigade during the Second Anglo-Sikh War (1848–49). At the 22 November 1848 Battle of Ramnagar the commanding officer of the 14th Light Dragoons, Lieutenant-Colonel William Havelock, was killed. White took command and led a charge against the Sikh cavalry. He allowed the Sikhs to move onto firm ground, away from the river bank, before attacking. After pushing them back he ordered his men to retire and not pursue the enemy into the deep sand. The British force were defeated in the battle. White's brigade protected the British left flank during the 13 January 1849 Battle of Chillianwala and were present in the victory in the final engagement of the war, the 21 February Battle of Gujrat. White was awarded the Punjab Medal and two clasps for his service in the war.

== General officer and retirement ==
White was promoted to major-general on 20 June 1854. He received the colonelcy of the 7th Dragoons on 26 August 1858 and was promoted to lieutenant-general on 1 September 1860. White was appointed a Knight Commander of the Order of the Bath on 10 November 1862. In later life he lived in London, where he died at Bayswater on 27 January 1868.
