= Michael J. White (sociologist) =

Sociologist and demographer

Michael Joseph White
- Education: B.A., Urban studies, Harvard College (1975); M.A., Sociology, University of Chicago (1977); Ph.D., Sociology, University of Chicago (1980)
- Occupations: Professor emeritus; sociologist; demographer; researcher
- Notable work: American Neighborhoods and Residential Differentiation (1987); Achieving Anew (2009); International Handbook of Migration and Population Distribution (2016)
- Website: https://pstc.brown.edu/people/michael-j-white

Michael Joseph White is a sociologist and demographer. He is the Robert E. Turner Distinguished Professor Emeritus of Population Studies and Professor Emeritus of Sociology at Brown University.

== Background and career ==
White earned a B.A. in urban studies from Harvard College in 1975, graduating magna cum laude. He later earned a M.A. in sociology from the University of Chicago in 1977 and a Ph.D. in sociology from the University of Chicago in 1980. His dissertation was titled Urban Renewal and the Changing Residential Structure of the City. At Chicago, White's work developed from urban studies and the Chicago School tradition into broader demographic research. According to the Population Association of America, he studied with demographer Donald J. Bogue, whose influence helped shape White's later international research agenda.

Before joining Brown, White held research and teaching appointments at the University of Chicago, Princeton University's School of Public and International Affairs, and the Urban Institute in Washington, D.C.. White joined Brown University in 1989 as an associate professor. He became professor in Brown's Department of Sociology in 1995 and remained a faculty associate of Brown's Population Studies and Training Center from 1989 to 2022. At Brown, White served as chair of the Department of Sociology from 1997 to 2000 and again from 2001 to 2004. He also served as director of the Population Studies and Training Center from 2006 to 2011.

From 2016 to 2022, White directed Brown's Spatial Structures in the Social Sciences initiative. In 2022, he became Professor of Population Studies (Research), Robert E. Turner Distinguished Professor Emeritus of Population Studies, and Professor Emeritus of Sociology at Brown. White has also held an honorary research appointment at the University of the Witwatersrand in South Africa and has served on advisory boards and scientific panels connected to population studies, migration, and demographic research.

== Work ==
White's work has focused on population distribution, migration, urbanization, residential segregation, immigrant adaptation, and the public-policy consequences of demographic change. His books include American Neighborhoods and Residential Differentiation, Achieving Anew: How New Immigrants Do in American Schools, Jobs, and Neighborhoods, and the edited volume International Handbook of Migration and Population Distribution.

== Recognition ==
White was named a fellow of the American Association for the Advancement of Science in 2014. His book Achieving Anew, co-authored with Jennifer E. Glick, won the 2010 Otis Dudley Duncan Book Award from the Population Section of the American Sociological Association. In 2017, White was recognized as an honored member by the Population Association of America.

== Books ==
- American Neighborhoods and Residential Differentiation (Russell Sage Foundation, 1987) ISBN 9781610445580
- Achieving Anew: How New Immigrants Do in American Schools, Jobs, and Neighborhoods (Russell Sage Foundation, 2009) ISBN 9781610447034
