= Frances Hodges White =

American writer of children's books (1866–1954)

Frances Hodges White (born Nellie Frances Hodges, June 18, 1866 – February 4, 1954) was an American writer of children's books.

== Biography ==
She was born and raised in Washington, Maine to William Hodge Jr. and Caroline Merrill Hodge. She attended Emerson College.

She was most known for her children's books Helena's Wonderworld (1900), Aunt Nabby's Children (1901), and Captain Jinks: The Autobiography of a Shetland Pony (1909), all published by L.C. Page & Company.

White lived in Lynn, Massachusetts. She was a member of the North Shore Club of Lynn and the Professional Women's Club of Boston.

She had a daughter, Elizabeth, with her first husband, Charles E. White.

== Later years ==
White married John Calvin Bucher, principal of the Peekskill Military Academy, in Peeksill, New York on April 5, 1924. She moved to Oak Park, Illinois and she owned Pine Knoll Camp in Conway, New Hampshire. Bucher died in 1945.

Frances Hodges White died on February 4, 1954, in Oak Park. She was buried in Hillside Cemetery in Peekskill.

== Works ==
- Sea Tales. Buffalo: Charles Wells Moulton, 1898.
- Captain Jinks: The Autobiography of a Shetland Pony. Boston: L.C. Page & Company, 1909.

=== Goldenrod Library ===
- Helena's Wonderworld. Illustrated by Charles A. Laurence and Ernest L. Proctor. Boston: L.C. Page & Company, 1900.
- Aunt Nabby's Children. Illustrated by Wallace Goldsmith. Boston: L.C. Page & Company, 1901.
