= Frank M. White =

American mechanical engineer (1933–2022)

- Born: September 26, 1933; Augusta, Georgia, U.S.
- Died: March 12, 2022 (aged 88); Narragansett, Rhode Island, U.S.
- Education: BS, MS, Ph.D in mechanical engineering
- Alma mater: Georgia Institute of Technology (BS, PhD); Massachusetts Institute of Technology (MS)
- Scientific career
- Fields: Engineering

Frank M. White (September 26, 1933 – March 12, 2022) was an American engineer and Professor Emeritus of Mechanical and Ocean Engineering at the University of Rhode Island. He was a professor in the Mechanical Engineering department as well as the Ocean Engineering department – which he helped found in 1966 as the first department of Ocean Engineering in the United States. He was the author of the popular engineering textbook "Fluid Mechanics" (now in its 9th edition) as well as three other textbooks on the topics of fluid mechanics and heat transfer.

White was a Fellow of the American Society of Mechanical Engineers (ASME). He was editor-in-chief of the ASME Journal of Fluids Engineering from 1979 until in 1991 he became chairman of the ASME Publication Committee and of the Board of Editors. In 1991, he also received the ASME Fluids Engineering Award.

White died in Narragansett, Rhode Island on March 12, 2022, at the age of 88.

== Publications ==
- Fluid Mechanics (1998–2015)
- Viscous Fluid Flow (1991–2011)
- Heat and Mass Transfer (1988)
- Heat Transfer (1983)
