= Michael K. White =

American writer known (born 1961)

Michael K. White (born July 4, 1961, in Pueblo, Colorado) is an American writer known mainly as being a founding member of the playwriting cooperative Broken Gopher Ink. For three decades Broken Gopher Ink's plays were performed not only in New York City but around the country and in Europe.

== Biography ==
White's poetry was actively published in the 1980s and was deeply involved in the seminal "lit mag" movement which spawned today's e-zine scene. His fiction and essays can be found in numerous publications. In 2006, the literary journal The Deepening published his novel My Apartment. That same year, his story "13 Halloweens" was chosen by StorySouth as one of the ten best short stories of 2006.

Broken Gopher Ink was known not only for their off beat plays but for their rigid non-recognition ethic that for many years shielded White and his partners, Kyle J. Bunch, Pete Fadner and Matthew Lubich from public attention and scrutiny. Never revealing their names or configurations, Broken Gopher Ink stressed that their work should speak for itself. Their "mega-monologue play" entitled My Heart and The Real World ran for almost two years continuously in New York City until 9/11. After that it was performed in the UK. In August 2010 the Paragon Theatre in Denver staged a reading of Broken Gopher Ink's play "I Know That You Love Me".

White, who resides in Colorado, is reportedly working on a collaborative novel titled 2028 involving seven writers from four continents. In August 2010 BluePrintPress published "My Apartment" in a signed, numbered limited edition "micro-novel". In 2010 LAP/Lambert published the full version of "My Apartment." In October 2012 The Cayuga Players premiered White's play "The Six Realms of Pizza Delivery," in Auburn, New York. In the spring of 2014 The Midtown Theatre Festival Playwriting Lab in New York City presented three short plays by White and poet Dianna Stark called "Daguerreotype Dialogues."
