= Michael White (criminologist) =

Professor of criminology (born 1951)

Michael D. White
- Born: January 25, 1951 (age 75)
- Education: Moravian College (B.A., 1992); Temple University (Ph.D., 1999)
- Known for: Work on police body-worn cameras
- Awards: 2016 Outstanding Experimental Field Trial award from the American Society of Criminology’s Division of Experimental Criminology
- Scientific career
- Fields: Criminology
- Workplaces: Arizona State University
- Thesis: Police shootings in Philadelphia: an analysis of two decades of deadly force (1999)

Michael Douglas White (born January 25, 1951) is a professor in the School of Criminology and Criminal Justice at Arizona State University, where he is also the associate director of the Center for Violence Prevention and Community Safety and director of the doctoral program in criminology and criminal justice. He is known for his research on the effects of police use of body-worn cameras. He produced a report for the United States Department of Justice summarizing the arguments for and against the use of such cameras.

The report concluded that "there is not enough evidence to offer a definitive recommendation regarding the adoption of body-worn cameras by police." Since then, he has predicted that all police departments with 50 or more officers will have body-worn cameras within two to three years.
