= Horses in the Napoleonic Wars =

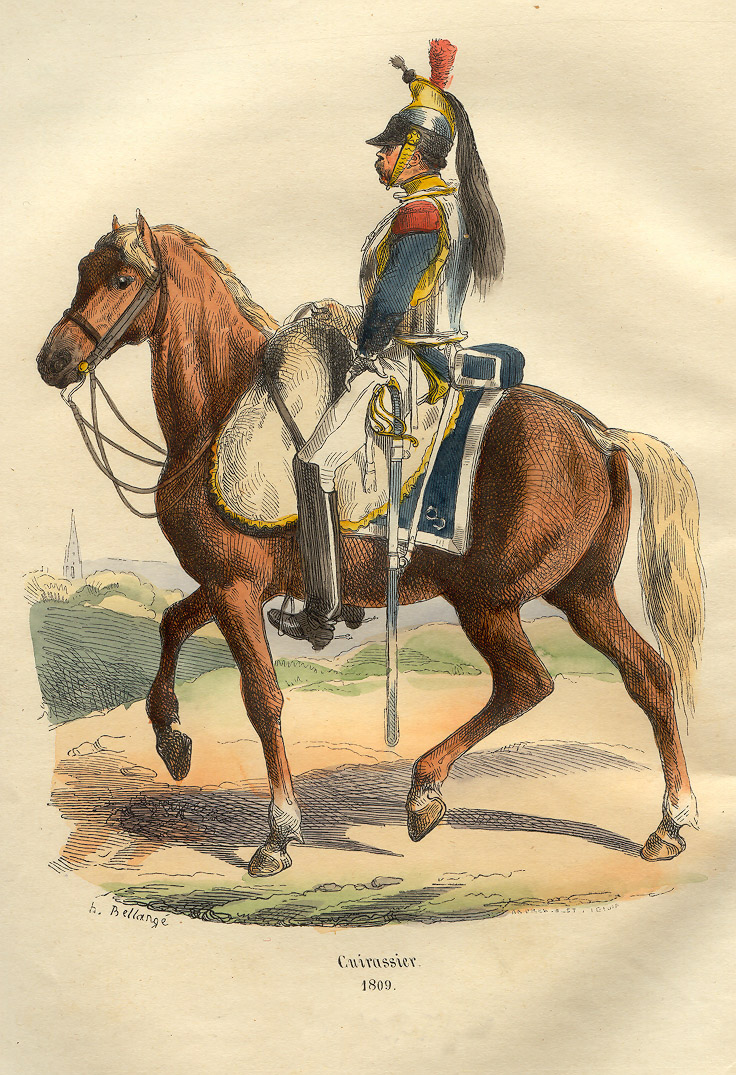
French cuirassier in 1809

Horses were widely used during the Napoleonic Wars for combat, patrol and reconnaissance, and for logistical support. Vast numbers were used throughout the wars. During the War of the Sixth Coalition, depletion of the French cavalry arm through attrition (mainly suffered during the Russian Campaign) and loss of horse-producing allies to provide remounts contributed significantly to the gradual French defeat and downfall of the French Empire. During the Waterloo Campaign, the Armée du Nord had 47,000 horses: 25,000 cavalry, 12,000 for artillery, 10,000 for infantry and supply columns.

== Cavalry ==
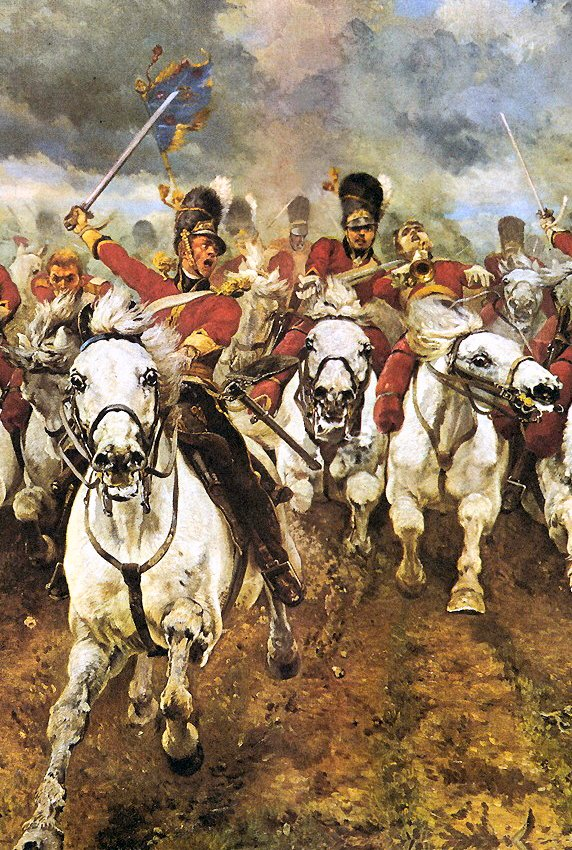
Scotland Forever! depicting the charge of the Royal Scots Greys at the Battle of Waterloo.

Although in larger forces the cavalry might be sufficient in numbers for the heavy regiments to be concentrated for use in ‘shock’ action, in armies with less cavalry the available troops might have to fulfill whatever role was needed, without the luxury of being able to allocate particular units to a specific duty. Wellington advocated the view that all cavalry should be capable of doing whatever was required ‘be they dressed or armed as they may’. Despite such opinions, the distinction between heavy and light regiments was generally maintained. On the battlefield, the cavalry's main offensive role was as shock troops, providing a mounted charge. Charges were carefully managed for speed, with a charge's maximum speed being 20 km/h (12 mph) . Faster progress resulted in a break in formation and blown horses. Murat merely demanded that his squadrons should ‘walk on the march and trot in the presence of the enemy’; Wellington’s cavalry always charged at full gallop – even if they sometimes got out of hand. A witness of one of the most celebrated charges of the period, that of the Royal Scots Greys at Waterloo, described how different it was to the attack à outrance depicted in Scotland for Ever. In reality, the regiment came over the crest of the Mont St-Jean ridge, passed through their own infantry, and almost immediately ran into the advancing French, so that the ‘actually walked over this Column’. Charges were undertaken across clear, rising ground, with the cavalry deploying in line or column, and often accompanied by horse artillery. Frequently, infantry followed behind, in order to secure any ground won. Once an enemy army had quit the field of battle and was on the retreat, cavalry would invariably be utilized in pursuit to further exploit a beaten foe's withdrawal and harass that army's rearguard. In defence, cavalry could be used to attack and harass the enemy's infantry flanks as they advanced. In addition, cavalry were used to break up enemy lines following successful infantry action.

Cavalry were extremely effective against infantry on the march, or when formed in line or column. A battalion formed in line was particularly vulnerable to cavalry, and could be broken or destroyed by a well-formed cavalry charge, such as when Lt-Col Colborne's brigade was destroyed during the Battle of Albuera in 1811, with the loss of 1,250 out of his 1,650 men. For protection, infantry sought their own cavalry screens and support. Otherwise, the infantry's only defence was to form square: a tight four-sided formation, presenting walls of muskets and bayonets, each side protecting the others' flanks. These were generally impenetrable to cavalry, but vulnerable to artillery or other infantry. Cavalry were frequently used prior to an infantry assault, so that their charges might force an infantry line to break and reform, into formations vulnerable to infantry or artillery. During these manoeuvres, they remained especially vulnerable to cavalry.

== Artillery ==
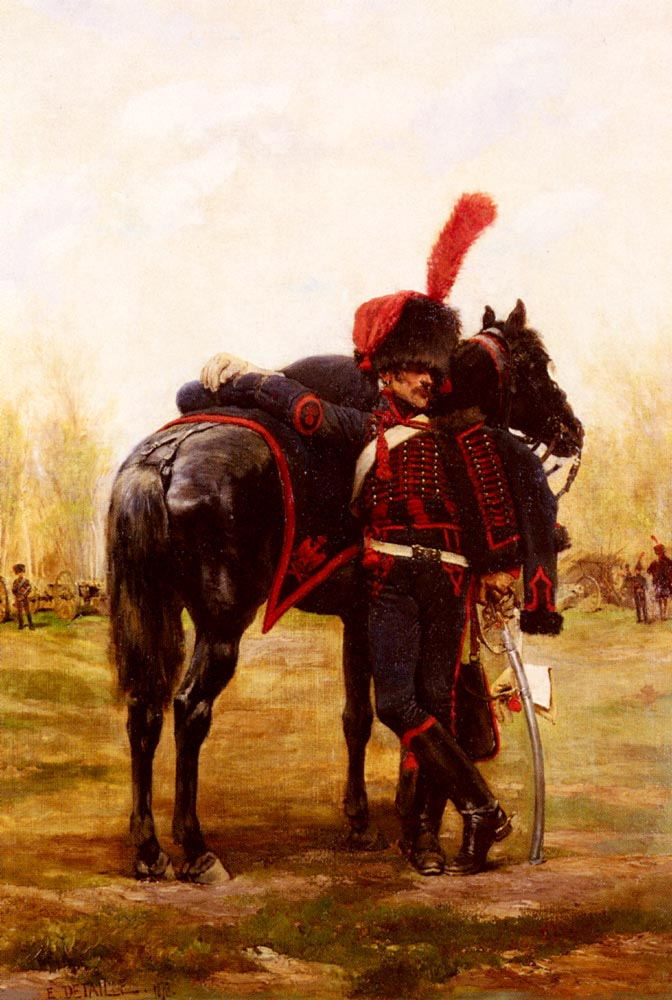
French horse artilleryman of the Imperial Guard

Another major use of horses throughout the period was as draught animals for the heavy artillery. In addition to field artillery, where horse-drawn guns were attended by gunners on foot, the armies generally had horse batteries, where each of the gunners were provided with mounts. Horse artillery generally used lighter pieces, although the British had some 9-pounder (medium-weight) horse batteries; for added speed, these had a team of 8 horses to pull them, rather than 6. In addition, horse artillery ammunition wagons were harnessed with an extra pair (6 horse instead of 4). Heavy artillery pieces needed a team of 12 horses. With the individual riding horses required for officers, surgeons and other support staff, as well as those pulling the artillery guns and supply wagons, an artillery battery of six guns could require 160 to 200 horses. By contrast, in 1813, Captain Bogue’s Troop, armed solely with Congreve rockets, a type of rocket artillery, required only 105 horses. Agility was important; the ideal artillery horse was 15 to 16 hands high, strongly built, but able to move quickly.

Horse artillery was generally used to support the cavalry units, and so came under the command of cavalry divisions, but in some battles, such as at Waterloo, the horse artillery were used by the British as a rapid response force, successfully repulsing attacks from the French, and assisting the infantry recapture of La Haye Sainte from the French.

== Horse types and breeds ==
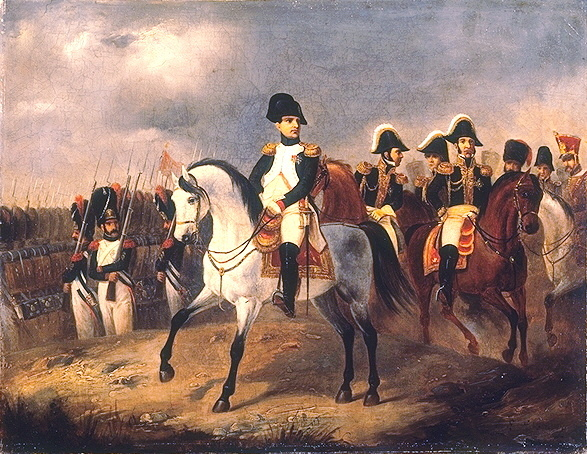
"Napoleon I with his Generals" by Ludwig Elsholtz. This painting shows light cavalry horses which come into use as officer's mounts in 18th and 19th century Europe.

The war horse was traditionally of moderate size for both officers and troopers, since heavy horses were logistically difficult to maintain, and less adaptable to varied terrain. Most armies at the time preferred cavalry horses to be 15.2 hands (62 inches, 157 cm) and 450–500 kilograms (990–1,100 lb). For example, in the French service in 1812, the mounts for the cuirassiers and carabiniers were those larger than 15.3 hands (63 inches, 160 cm), the dragoons from 15.0 to 15.3 hands (60 to 63 inches, 152 to 160 cm), the hussars on horses about 14.2 hands (58 inches, 147 cm), whilst the chasseurs à cheval were on horses between 14.3 and 15 hands (59 and 60 inches, 150 and 152 cm); lighter horses were restricted to scouting and raiding. In his Despatches Wellington insisted that the remounts to be sent out from England should not be under 15 hands for cavalry and artillery. Even so, in 1813 the average size of the horses of the British 10th Hussars was about 15 hands, but the 2nd Dragoons had 340 ponies of 14.2 hands and 55 ponies of 14 hands (56 inches, 142 cm); Cavalry horses were generally obtained at 5 years, from 10 to 12 years service (barring loss) could be expected. Mares and geldings were used in preference to the less-easily managed stallions. Losses of 30–40% were common during a campaign, due to the lack of suitable forage, conditions of the march as well as enemy action. As regimental structures developed, many units selected horses of uniform type, some, such as the Royal Scots Greys and 2nd Dragoon Guards (Queen’s Bays), even specifying colour. Trumpeters, too, often rode distinctive horses, such as greys, so they might stand out. Regional armies developed preferences, such as the British 15 hh hunters, the Central Germans' Hanoverians, the Prussians’ Trakehner horses from East Prussia and the Cossacks' steppe ponies.

== See also ==
- Horses in warfare
- Types of military forces in the Napoleonic Wars
