= Frances J. White =

American anthropologist

Frances J. White is a British biological anthropologist, professor, and primatologist at the University of Oregon. As a behavioral ecologist, her research focuses on the evolution of primate sociality and social systems. She has studied the socioecology of the bonobo chimpanzee (Pan paniscus) for over 35 years at Lomako Forest in the Democratic Republic of Congo. She is the foremost American authority on this species in the wild and has done extensive field research on the bonobo or pygmy chimpanzees. Her bonobo research examines why bonobos have evolved a very different social system compared to the closely related chimpanzee.

She graduated from Cambridge University, UK, with a BA in 1980, an MA in 1984, and a PhD from Stony Brook University, Department of Ecology and Evolution, New York in 1986. Her advisor at Stony Brook was Professor John Fleagle. In 2021, she was made a Fellow of the Royal Society of Biology.

She was also the primary biological anthropologist in a NOVA documentary called The Last Great Ape.

== Recent publications ==
For recent publications, see Google Scholar Profile at https://scholar.google.com/citations?user=TIhuxf4AAAAJ&hl=en&oi=ao

- Sex differences in bonobo (Pan paniscus) terrestriality: implications for human evolution. 2020 Journal of Anthropological Sciences 98: 5-14.(co-author)
- Stable isotope data from bonobo (Pan paniscus) fecal samples from the Lomako Nature Reserve, Democratic Republic of the Congo. 2019 African Journal of Ecology 57(3) 437–442. (co-author)
- New observations of meat eating and sharing in wild bonobos (Pan paniscus) at Iyema, Lomako Forest Reserve, DRC. 2019 Folia Primatologica 90(3): 179–189. (co-author)
- Infant handling in bonobos (Pan paniscus): exploring functional hypotheses and the relationship to oxytocin. 2018. Physiology and Behavior 193: 154–166. (co-author)
- Initiation of genetic demographic monitoring of bonobos (Pan paniscus) at Iyema, Lomako Forest, DRC. 2016. Primate Conservation 30: 103–111. (co-author)
- Sex differences in tool use acquisition in bonobos (Pan paniscus). American Journal of Primatology, 2013, 75, 917–926.(co-author)
- Evolution of Primate Peace. In: Fry, D. (ed.) War, Peace, and Human Nature: The Convergence of Evolutionary and Cultural Views. NY: Oxford University Press. P.. 389–406. (co-author)
- Shellfish, seasonality, and stable isotope sampling. Journal of Island and Coastal Archaeology, 2013, 8, 1790–189. (co-author)
- Paleocoastal lithic use, preference, and availability on western Santarosae. North American Archaeology, 2013, 43(1), 49–69. (co-author)
