= 24th Regiment of (Light) Dragoons =

24th Light Dragoons
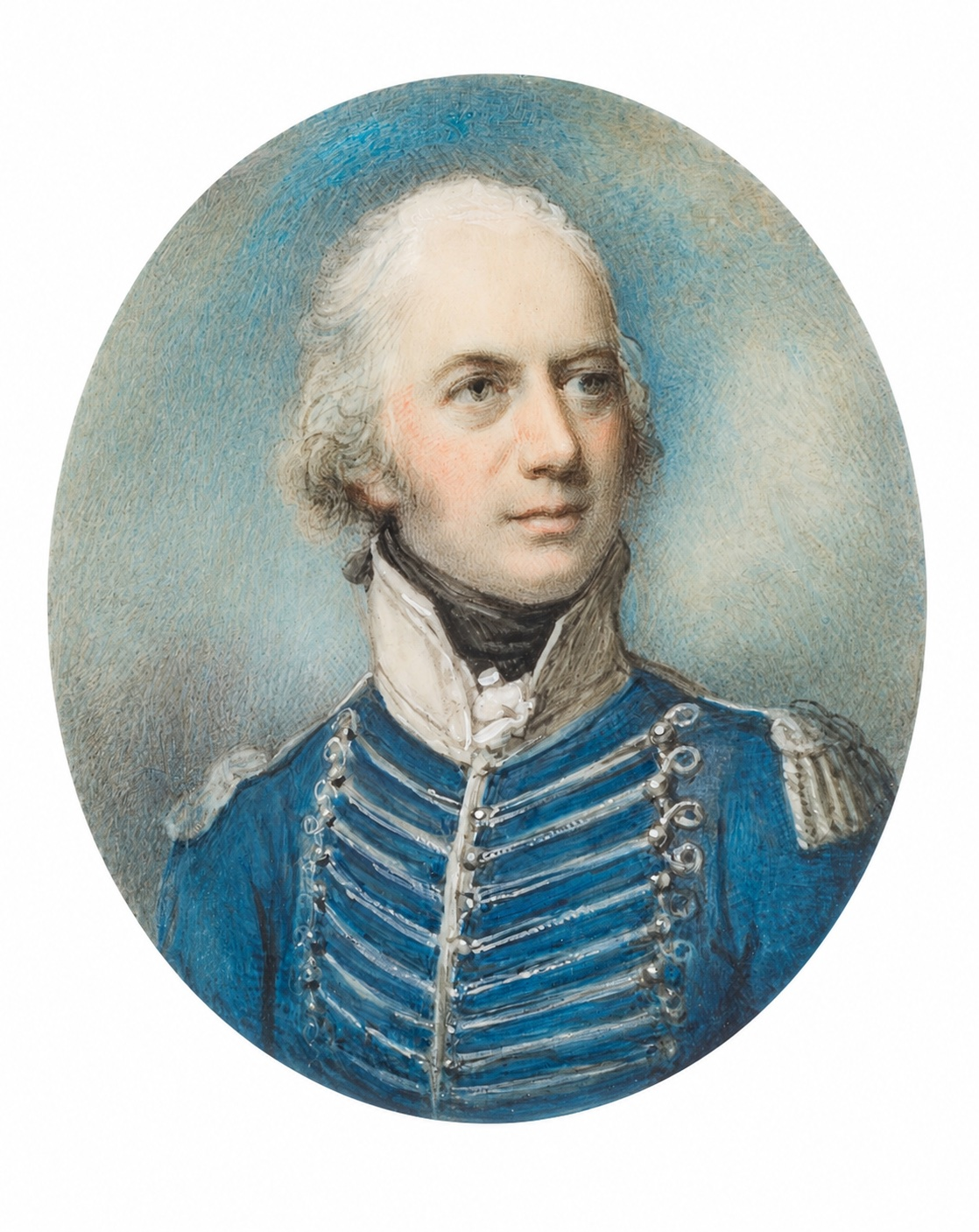
- Colonel of the Regiment, William Loftus wearing the blue regimental uniform with silver facings and a white collar and black cravat by Richard Cosway, circa 1794
- Active: 1794–1819
- Disbanded: 1819
- Country: United Kingdom
- Branch: British Army
- Type: Cavalry
- Nickname: Loftus Regiment
- Motto: Death or Glory

Commanders
- Notable commanders: Lord William Bentinck

The 24th Regiment of (Light) Dragoons was a regiment in the British Army which existed between 1794 and 1819.

== English establishment ==
The regiment was raised by Colonel William Loftus and commissioned on 20 March 1794 as the 24th Regiment of (Light) Dragoons, which was sworn in at Netley Camp, near Southampton. On 1 October, Colonel Loftus was commissioned as the colonel of the regiment, moving his headquarters to Blandford in Dorset in the same month, billeting in neighbouring towns and villages for six months. Lieutenant Colonel Lord William Bentinck was appointed to command the regiment, reporting at Blandford by 28 December 1794.

Loftus had raised the regiment with the intention of serving in Ireland, deliberately recruited mostly from Norfolk men and not Irish recruits to reduce the potential of divided loyalties. Once orders for assignment to Ireland had been completed, the regiment moved to Bath in April 1795, under orders to march to Liverpool for embarkation to Ireland, landing at Dublin on 2 May.

== Irish establishment ==
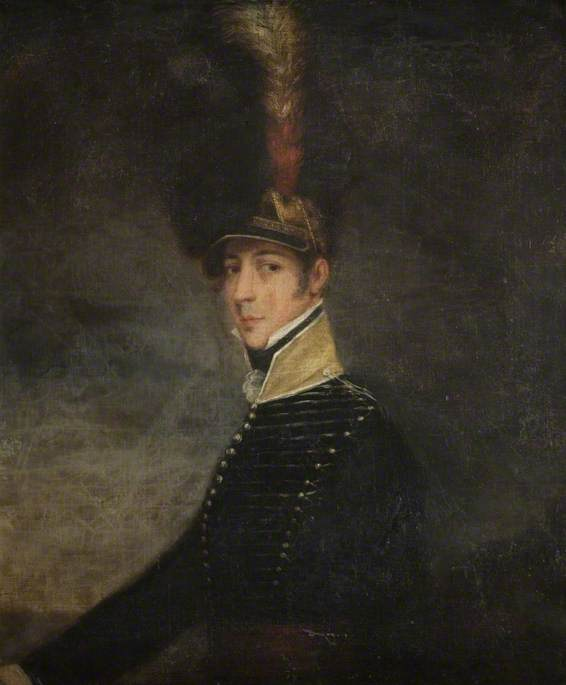
Officer of the 24th Light Dragoons circa 1795

Bentinck commanded the regiment in Ireland, quartered in Clonmel initially. Bentinck took a squadron to Armagh in response to the Battle of the Diamond, transferring his headquarters to Armagh in October. On 25 December, the entire regiment was transferred to the Irish establishment.

The regiment retained its presence in Armagh in 1796 and 1797, latterly to guard against a landing of French invasion force in the north. In the Irish rebellion in 1798, the 24th were repeatedly given marching orders to defend against the landing of French troops who were to support the uprising. When the rebellion itself broke out on 7 June in Antrim, the regiment was headquartered in Armagh under Bentinck’s command. When French troops under General Humbert did land at Killala on 22 August, the 24th were ordered by General Nugent to march to Enniskillen, where Bentinck was required to take command as brigadier. French reinforcements were expected to bolster General Humbert’s small force, but nobody knew where they might land. After Humbert was defeated in early September, the regiment was brought back north to relieve the defences at Belturbet, Cavan and Enniskillen in expectation of a larger imminent invasion force. As it turned out, the 24th probably never faced the French, who were defeated a month later by weather and a naval battle. By 24 October 1798, it was all over for French intervention in Ireland; the regiment returned to its headquarters in Armagh and thereafter to Dublin for the rest of its service in Ireland.

== A new beginning ==
Loftus had hatched the concept of raising a regiment of cavalry in Ireland as early as 1783, but he lacked the experience, funding and support to carry it through. Ten years later, he succeeded in raising both funds and support, as concerns were increasing about the French Revolutionary Wars. There is no contemporary record that the regiment was raised as Fencible, but following the Treaty of Amiens, the 24th Regiment was disbanded in 1802, along with the 22nd, 23rd, and 28th Regiments.

In the following year, the 27th Regiment of (Light) Dragoons was renamed the 24th, serving in India, where they were exposed to an adventurous period of service under the command of Lord Lake, gaining the right to wear an elephant badge with the honor "HINDOSTAN". In general orders issued on the departure of the regiment from India on 8 October 1818, its services were very highly spoken of, but in 1819, they left Bengal to return to England, when on 4 May 1819, the Prince Regent ordered the 24th to be disbanded. On 24 May 1819, the Regiment was disbanded at Chatham.

== Action ==
- Irish Rebellion of 1798 (1798)
- Second Anglo-Maratha War (1803)
- Third Anglo-Maratha War (1817)
