= Frank G. White =

United States Army general (1910–2002)

Frank George White (January 18, 1910 – March 24, 2002) was an American Army Major General. He received the Legion of Merit with Oak Leaf Cluster, the American Defense Service Medal, American Campaign Medal, World War II Victory Medal, National Defense Service Medal, and the European-Middle East Campaign Medal.

== Biography ==
General White was born in Chickasha, Oklahoma. In 1937, he graduated from the University of Oklahoma. On May 31, 1937, he received his reserve commission as a second lieutenant in the field artillery. He went active duty July 5, 1937, at Fort Sill, Oklahoma. On July 1 of the following year, he was commissioned a second lieutenant in the Regular Army. He joined the 8th Field Artillery at Schofield Barracks, Hawaii in October.

He was assigned to the U.S. Army Mission in the Middle East after the start of World War II as Chief of the Tank Advisory Team. With the establishment of the U.S. Middle East Theater in July 1942, he was transferred to that headquarters in the Ordnance Section. he later became Assistant Chief of Staff, Logistics. On August 15, 1945, he returned the United States for service with the Control Division in the Army Service Forces.

He attended Harvard University's Graduate School of Business Administration beginning in September 1948. He graduated June 1950 and served in the office of the Ordnance Comptroller and as Chief of the Ordnance Management Office. From October 1952 to August 1956, he served as Chief of the General Supply Branch. In July 1957, he served Eight Army in Korea as Deputy Ordnance Office. In August 1959, he served as the president of the Army Maintenance Board at Fort Knox, Kentucky. In July, 1960, he was Commandant of the Army Logistics Management Center at Fort Lee, Virginia. From there he became the Defense Supply Agency's Deputy Executive Director of Procurement and Production in January 1962. In 1964, he was Assistant Chief of Staff for Logistics for the Commander in Chief Pacific.
