= White (disambiguation) =

White is a color.

White(s) or The White(s) may also refer to:

== Arts ==
=== Music ===
- White (band), a progressive rock musical group
- White, a band whose "Future Pleasures" is a song in Guitar Hero Live
- White (Angela Aki album), 2011
- White (Show-Ya album), 1988
- White (Superfly album), 2015
- White (Made in France), an album by Rifle Sport, 1987
- The White Album (disambiguation)
- The White EP (disambiguation)
- "White" (CNBLUE song), 2015
- "White" (KAT-TUN song), 2011
- "White", a song by LIGHTS from Lights
- "White", a song by Wendy & Lisa, 1987
- "White", a song by Frank Ocean from Channel Orange, 2012
- "White", a song by GFriend from Season of Glass, 2015
- The Whites, an American country music group

=== Drama ===
- White (TV series), a BBC documentary series
- Whites (TV series), a BBC sitcom
- Three Colours: White, a 1994 film by Krzysztof Kieślowski
- White (play), a 2010 play for children by Catherine Wheels Theatre Company
- White: Melody of Death, a 2011 South Korean horror film
- White (2016 film), a Malayalam film

=== Other ===
- The White, a fictional group in the Age of the Five novel trilogy by Trudi Canavan
- White Amp, a musical equipment brand
- White (novel), aka White: The Great Pursuit, a 2004 novel by Ted Dekker
- The Whites (novel), a 2015 detective novel by Richard Price
- General White, a character in Paper Mario: The Thousand-Year Door

== Biology ==
- Pierinae, a subfamily of butterflies commonly called the whites
  - Appias, genus of Pierinae sometimes called the whites
  - Pieris, a genus of Pierinae commonly called the whites or garden whites
  - Pontia, a third genus of Pierinae sometimes called the whites
- White (horse), a horse coloring
- White (mutation), a color mutation in fruit flies

== People ==
- White people, a population group identified in some countries, also referred to as whites
  - White Americans, a United States Census Bureau designation
  - Non-Hispanic whites, a subset of the above; often conflated with "white" in the American vernacular
- White and Black in chess, identification of the players in the game of chess, referring to the colour of the pieces

=== Individuals ===
- White (surname), a family name
- White Burkett Miller (1866–1929), an American lawyer
- White Graves, an American football player

== Places in the United States ==
- White, Georgia, a city
- White, Missouri, a town
- White, South Dakota, a city
- White, Washington, an unincorporated community
- Whites, Washington, an unincorporated community
- White's Ford, a former crossing of the Nodaway River in Missouri

== Politics ==
- Nationalist faction (Spanish Civil War), also known as los Blancos (the Whites)
- White movement or the Whites, a Russian political movement
  - White Army, the armies of the White movement, also known as the Whites
- White (political adjective), describing one of several political movements
- Whites (Finland), the refugee government and forces during the Finnish civil war
- Whites (January Uprising), a factions of the insurgents during the January Uprising in Poland
- Whites (Montenegro), a pan-Serbian Montenegrin political movement

== Sport ==
- Cricket whites, the uniform worn by cricketers
- Swansea RFC or the Whites, a Welsh rugby union team
- The Whites, a nickname for English football club Bolton Wanderers F.C.
- The Whites, a nickname for English football club Fulham F.C.
- The Whites, a nickname for English football club Leeds United F.C.
- Los Blancos (the Whites), a nickname for Spanish sports club Real Madrid

== Companies ==
- White Airways, a Portuguese airline
- White (architecture firm), a Swedish company
- White Motor Company, a defunct maker of automobiles and trucks
- White's Boots, an American shoemaker

== Other uses ==
- Amphetamines, also known as "white crosses" or "whites"
- "Chef's whites", a term for a chef's uniform
- Egg white, the clear liquid in an egg
- Sclera, the white part of an eye, commonly called the "white of the eye"
- White (crater), a lunar impact crater
- White Day, a holiday in Japan, South Korea, Taiwan and China
- White's, a London gentleman's club
- Whites in laundry, referring to fabrics
- The whites, an old term for leukorrhea

== See also ==
- Bai people, a Chinese ethnic group, where bai means "white"
- Le Blanc (disambiguation)
- Justice White (disambiguation)
- Snow White (disambiguation)
- White hole (disambiguation)
- White House (disambiguation)
- White Mountain (disambiguation)
- List of people known as the White
- Whyte (disambiguation)
- Wight (disambiguation)
- Wite (disambiguation)
- Black, opposite of white
