= Wight (disambiguation) =

A wight is a sentient creature or being, in modern fantasy works especially an undead or zombie-like creature or spirit.

Wight may also refer to:

== Arts, entertainment, and media ==
- Wight (Dungeons & Dragons), a fictional monster in Dungeons & Dragons
- Wights, characters in A Song of Ice and Fire
  - Wights, characters in Game of Thrones
- Barrow-wight, a fictitious creature

== Business and organisations ==
- J. Samuel White, a British shipbuilding firm; its former aviation department (1912–1916) was called Wight Aircraft
- Wight and Wight, a former architecture firm in Kansas City, Missouri, United States

== People ==
- Wight (surname), a family name

== Places ==
- Isle of Wight, an island off the southern coast of England
  - Wight, a sea area around the island
- Wight, Texas, United States
- Wight Bank, a small submerged atoll in the Indian Ocean
- Wight Inlet, Nunavut, Canada

== See also ==
- Isle of Wight (disambiguation)
- White (disambiguation)
- Whyte (disambiguation)
