= Mary Louise Booth =

American editor, translator, and writer (1831–1889)

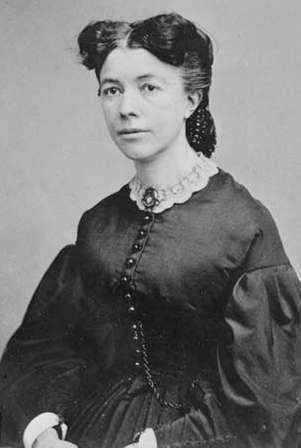
- Born: April 19, 1831; Millville, New York, U.S.
- Died: March 5, 1889 (aged 57); New York City, U.S.
- Occupations: Editor, translator, writer
- Partner: Anne W. Wright
- Writing career
- Language: English
- Years active: 1845–1889
- Notable works: editor-in-chief, Harper's Bazaar

Mary Louise Booth (April 19, 1831 – March 5, 1889) was an American editor, translator, and writer. She was the first editor-in-chief of the women's fashion magazine Harper's Bazaar.

At the age of eighteen, Booth left the family home for New York City to Manhattan and learned the trade of a vest-maker. Booth contributed tales and sketches to various newspapers and magazines but was not paid for them. She began to do reporting and book-reviewing for educational and literary journals, still without any pay in money, but happy at being occasionally paid in books.

As time went on, she received more and more literary assignments. She widened her circle of friends to those who were beginning to appreciate her abilities. In 1859, she agreed to write a history of New York, but even then, she was unable to support herself wholly, although she had given up vest-making and was writing twelve hours a day. When she was thirty years old, she accepted the position of amanuensis to Dr. J. Marion Sims, and this was the first work of the kind for which she received steady payment. She was now able to do without her father's assistance, and live on her resources in New York, though very plainly.

In 1861, at the beginning of the Civil War, she procured the advance sheets, in the French language, of Agénor de Gasparin's Uprising of a Great People. By working twenty hours a day, she translated the whole book in less than a week, and it was published in a fortnight. The book created a sensation among Unionists, and she received letters of thanks for it from U.S. Senator Charles Sumner and President Abraham Lincoln. But again, she received little compensation for her work. While the war lasted, she translated many French books into English, calculated to rouse patriotic feeling, and was, at one time, summoned to Washington, D.C. to write for the statesmen, receiving only her board at a hotel. She was able at this time to arrange for her father the position of clerk in the New York Custom House.

At the end of the civil war, Booth had proved herself so fit as a writer that Messrs. Harper offered her the editorship of Harper's Bazaar – headquartered in New York City – a position in which she served from its beginning in 1867 until her death. She was at first diffident as to her abilities, but finally accepted the responsibility, and it was principally due to her that the magazine became so popular. While keeping its character of a home paper, it steadily increased in influence and circulation, and Booth's success was achieved with that of the paper she edited. She is said to have received a larger salary than any woman in the United States at the time. She died, after a short illness, on March 5, 1889.

== Early life and education ==
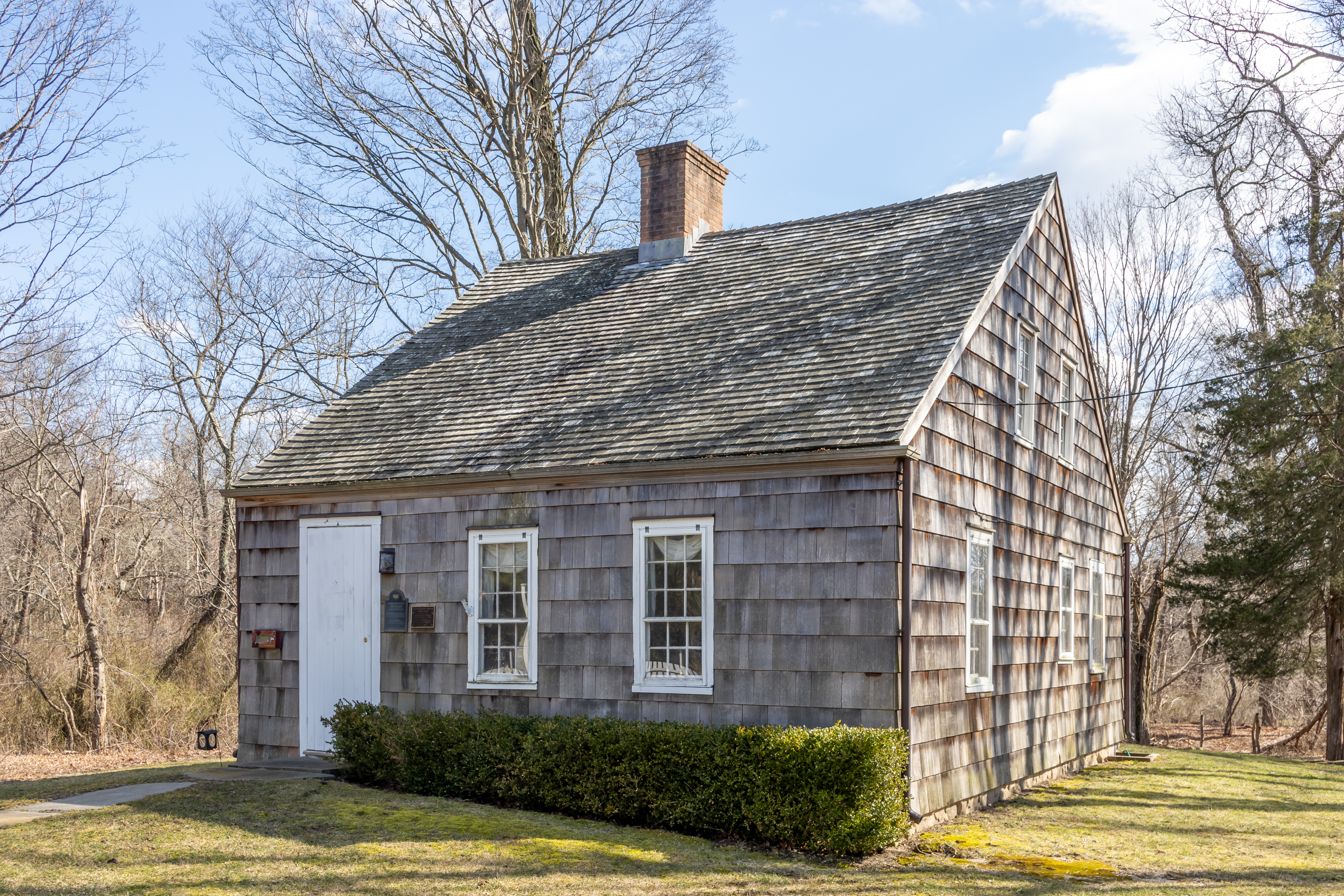
Booth's childhood home in Yaphank, New York

Mary Louise Booth was born in Millville, in present-day Yaphank, New York, April 19, 1831. Her parents were William Chatfield Booth and Nancy Monswell.

Booth's mother was of French descent, the granddaughter of a refugee from the French Revolution. Booth's father was descended from an early settler, John Booth, who came to the United States in 1649, a kinsman of English politician Sir George Booth. In 1652, John Booth purchased Shelter Island from the Native Americans, for 300 feet (91 m) of calico. For at least 200 years, the family stayed close by. William Chatfield Booth, for some years, provided night-watchmen for several large business houses in New York. Along with Mary Louise, another daughter and two sons comprised the remainder of his family, the younger of the sons being Colonel Charles A. Booth, who later spent twenty years in the army.

Mary Louise Booth was characterized as a precocious child, so much so that, on being asked, she once confessed she had no more recollection of learning to read either French or English than of learning to talk. As soon as she could walk, her mother said, Booth was following her about, book in hand, begging to be taught to read stories for herself. Before she was five years old, she had finished reading the Bible. She also read Plutarch at a young age, and at age seven, had mastered Racine in the original language, upon which she began the study of Latin with her father. From that time onward, she was an indefatigable reader, devoted to books rather than play. Her father had a considerable library. Before her eleventh birthday, she had acquainted herself with Hume, Gibbon, Alison, and similar writers.

At this point, Booth was sent away to school. Her parents took all possible pains with her education, and her physical strength was sufficient to carry her through an uninterrupted course in different academies and a series of lessons with masters at home. She cared more for languages and natural sciences, in which she was very proficient, than for most other studies, and took no special pleasure in mathematics. At school, Booth learned less than she did by herself. She was only a tiny child when she taught herself French, having come across a French primer. She became interested in spelling out the French words and comparing them with the English ones and continued to study in this way. Later, she acquired German in the same manner. Being self-taught, and not hearing either language, she never learned to speak them but made herself so proficient in them in later years that she could translate almost any book from either German or French, reading them aloud in English.

When Booth was about thirteen years of age, the family moved to Brooklyn, New York, and there her father organized the first public school that was established in that city. Mary helped her father teach at school. He could never quite bring himself to believe that she was capable of her own financial support, and always insisted upon giving her generous gifts. In 1845 and 1846, she taught in her father's school in Williamsburg, New York, but gave up that pursuit on account of her health, and devoted herself to literature.

As Booth grew older, her determination to make literature her profession became very strong. As she was the oldest of four children, her father did not feel that it would be fair to the others to give her more than her just proportion of aid, since the others might also, in time, require assistance. Consequently, when she was eighteen years old, Booth decided that it was necessary for her work that she should be in New York as she could not depend entirely upon her father.

== Early career ==
A friend who was a vest-maker offered to teach Booth the trade, and this enabled her to carry out her plan of going to New York. She took a small room in the city and went home only for Sundays, as the communication between Williamsburg and New York was very slow in those days, and the journey could not be made in less than three hours. Two rooms were always kept ready for her in her parents' house. But her family felt so little sympathy in her literary work that she rarely mentioned it at home.

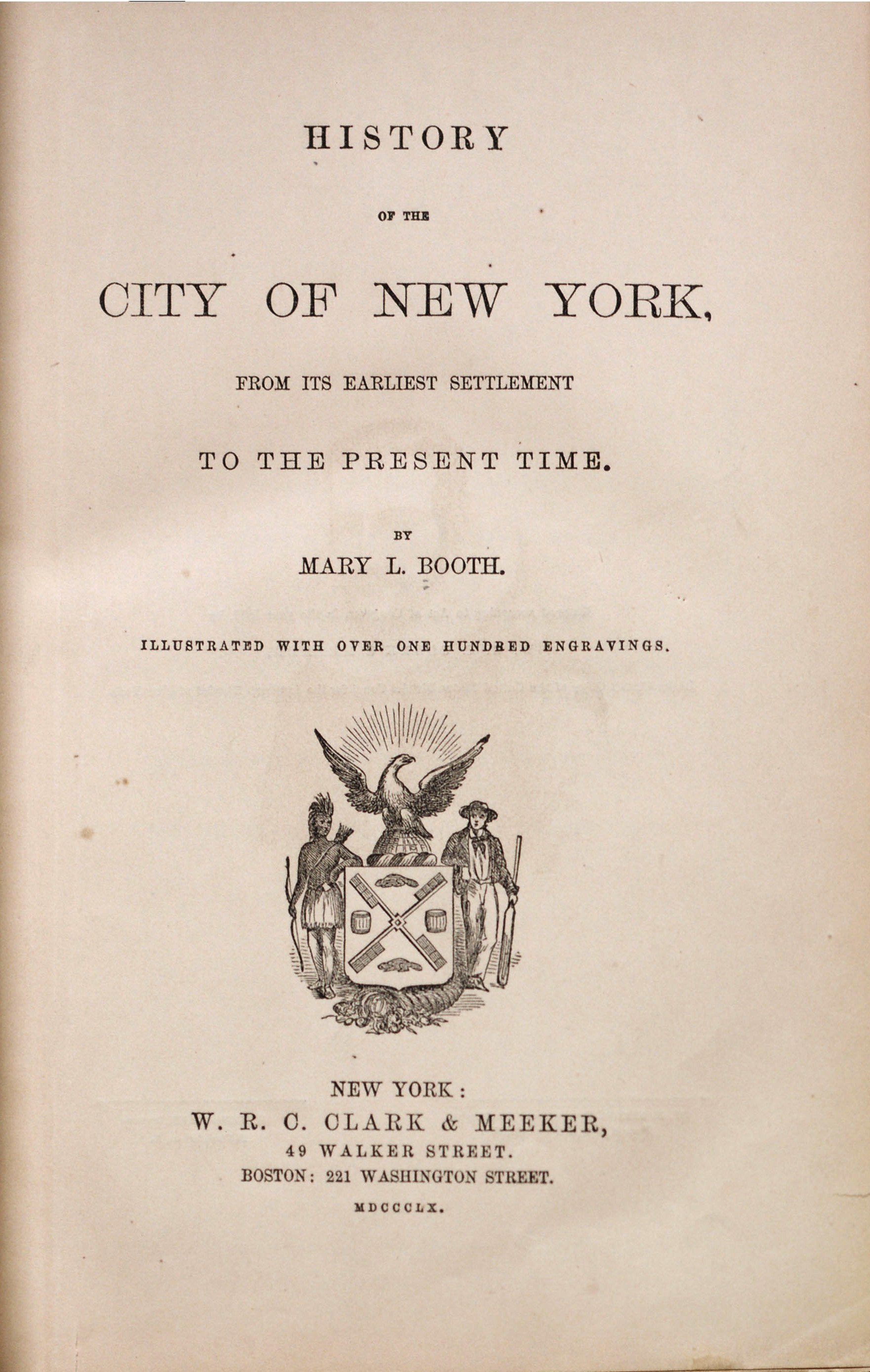
History of the City of New York 1859 by Mary Louise Booth

Booth wrote tales and sketches for newspapers and magazines. She translated from the French The Marble-Worker's Manual (New York, 1856) and The Clock and Watch Maker's Manual. She translated Joseph Méry's André Chénier and Edmond François Valentin About's The King of the Mountains for Emerson's Magazine, which also published Booth's original articles. She next translated Victor Cousin's Secret History of the French Court: or, Life and Times of Madame de Chevreuse (1859). That same year, the first edition of her History of the City of New York appeared, which was the result of great research. It was her prized possession. Next, she assisted Orlando Williams Wight in making a series of translations of the French classics, and she also translated About's Germaine (Boston, 1860).

A friend had suggested to Booth that no complete history of New York City had ever been written and that it might be well to prepare such a one for the use of schools. She began the undertaking, and, after some years finished a draft which, on the request of a publisher, became the basis of a more important work upon the same subject. During her work, Booth had full access to libraries and archives. Washington Irving sent her a letter of cordial encouragement, and D. T. Valentine, Henry B. Dawson, William John Davis, Edmund Bailey O'Callaghan, and numerous others provided her with documents and assistance. "My Dear Miss Booth," wrote historian Benson John Lossing, "the citizens of New York owe you a debt of gratitude for this popular story of the life of the great metropolis, containing so many important facts in its history, and included in one volume accessible to all. I congratulate you on the completeness of the task and the admirable manner in which it has been performed." Booth's history of New York City appeared in one large volume. It was so well-received that the publisher proposed Booth should go abroad and write popular histories of the great European capitals, London, Paris, Berlin, and Vienna. Though the future appeared bright for the young writer, the approach of the civil war and other circumstances prevented her travel.

== Civil War era ==
Shortly after the publication of the first edition of this work, the civil war broke out. Booth had always been an anti-slavery partisan and a sympathizer with movements for what she considered progress. Booth was enlisted on the side of the Union and longed to do something to help the cause. However, she did not feel qualified to act as a nurse in military hospitals.

After she received an advance copy of Count Agénor de Gasparin's Un Grand Peuple Qui Se Releve ("Uprising of a Great People"), she at once saw her opportunity in how she could be of assistance. She took the work to Charles Scribner, proposing he should publish it. He stated that he would gladly do so if the translation were ready, but that the war would be over before the book was out; but if it could be ready in a week, he would publish it. Booth went home and went to work, receiving the proof-sheets at night and returning them with a fresh copy in the morning. Within a week, the translation was finished, and in a fortnight, the book was published. Nothing else published during the war made such a sensation as this volume. The newspapers of the day were full of reviews and notices, eulogistic and otherwise, according to the party represented. "It is worth a whole phalanx in the cause of human freedom," wrote Senator Sumner.

The publication of the translation put Booth into communication with Gasparin and his wife, who begged her to visit them in Switzerland.

A second edition of the History was published in 1867, and a third edition, revised, appeared in 1880. A large paper edition of the work was taken by well-known book-collectors, extended and illustrated by them with supplementary prints, portraits, and autographs. One copy, enlarged to folio and extended to nine volumes by several thousand maps, letters, and other illustrations, was owned in the city of New York. Another was owned by Booth, enriched by more than two thousand illustrations on inserted leaves.

In rapid succession appeared Booth's translations of Gasparin's America before Europe (New York, 1861), Augustin Cochin's Results of Emancipation and Results of Slavery (Boston, 1862), and Édouard René de Laboulaye's Paris in America (New York, 1865). For the Cochin translations, she received praise and encouragement from President Lincoln, Senator Sumner, and other statesmen. During the entire war, she maintained a correspondence with Cochin, Gasparin, Laboulaye, Henri Martin, Charles Forbes René de Montalembert, and other European sympathizers with the Union. At that time, she also translated the Countess de Gasparin's Vesper, Camille, and Human Sorrows, and Count Gasparin's Happiness. Documents forwarded to her by French friends of the Union were translated and published in pamphlets, issued by the Union League Club, or printed in the New York journals. Booth translated Martin's History of France. The two volumes treating of The Age of Louis XIV were issued in 1864, and two others, the last of the seventeen volumes of the original work, in 1866 under the title of The Decline of the French Monarchy. It was intended to follow these with the other volumes from the beginning, but, although she translated two others, the enterprise was abandoned, and no more were printed. Her translation of Martin's abridgment of his History of France appeared in 1880. She also translated Laboulaye's Fairy Book, Jean Macé's Fairy Tales, and Blaise Pascal's Lettres provinciales (Provincial Letters). She received hundreds of appreciative letters from statesmen — Henry Winter Davis, Senator James Rood Doolittle, Galusha A. Grow, Dr. Francis Lieber, Dr. Bell, the president of the Sanitary Commission, and a host of others, among them Cassius M. Clay, and Attorney-General James Speed. Her translations ran to nearly forty volumes. She had thought of adding to this number, at the request of James T. Fields, an abridgment of George Sand's voluminous Histoire de ma vie; circumstances, however, prevented the completion of the work.

== Harper's Bazaar ==
In the year 1867, Booth undertook another enterprise in assuming the management of Harper's Bazaar, a weekly journal devoted to the pleasure and improvement of the home. For a long time, she had good relations with the Harpers, the four brothers who founded the magazine which bears their name, and who conducted its business.

Under her editorial management, the magazine's circulation grew to several hundred thousand subscribers. She worked with assistants across departments while directing the publication's overall content. The magazine reached a wide readership in American homes, and Booth served as its editor for nearly sixteen years.[17]

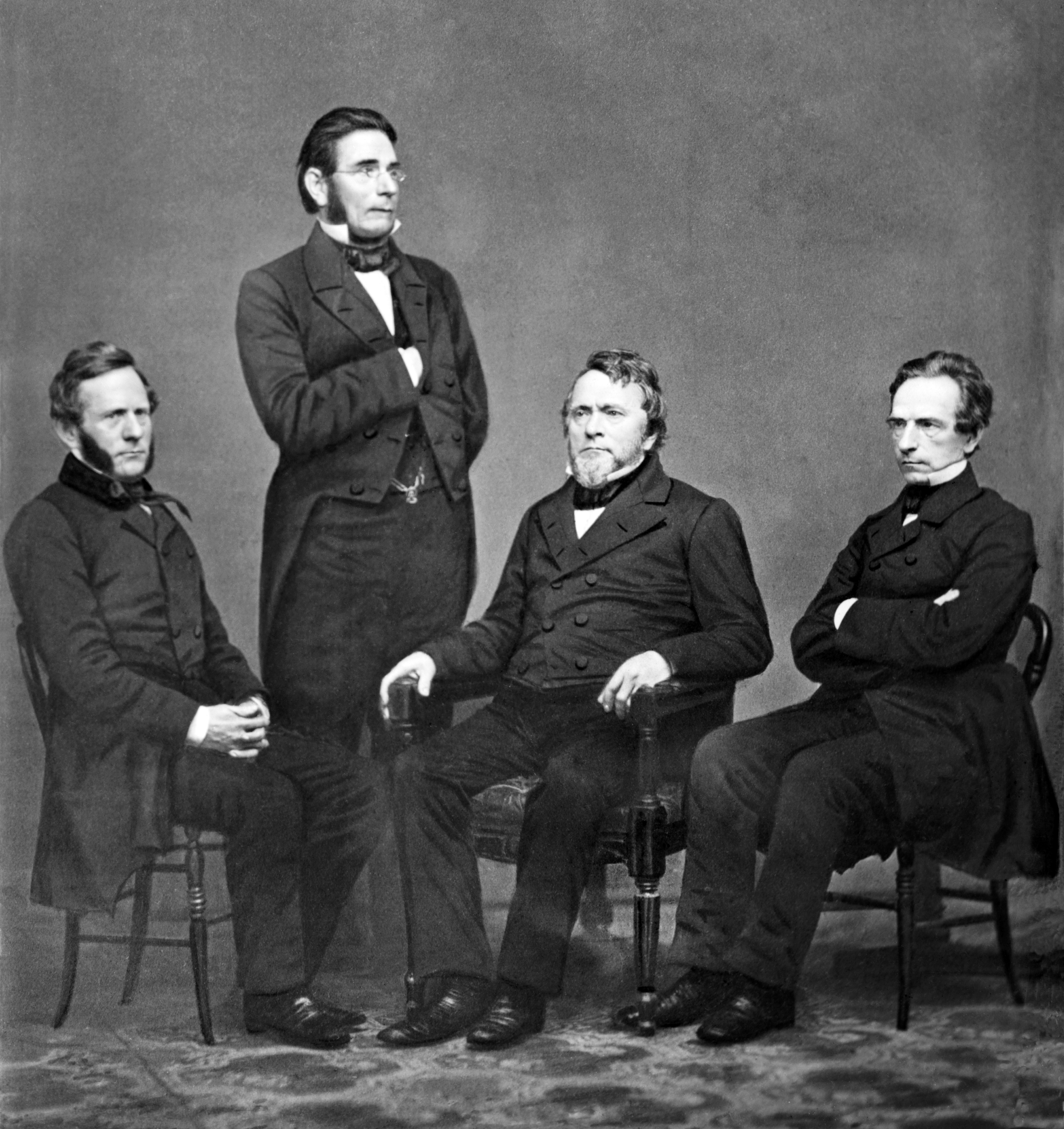
Messrs. Harper

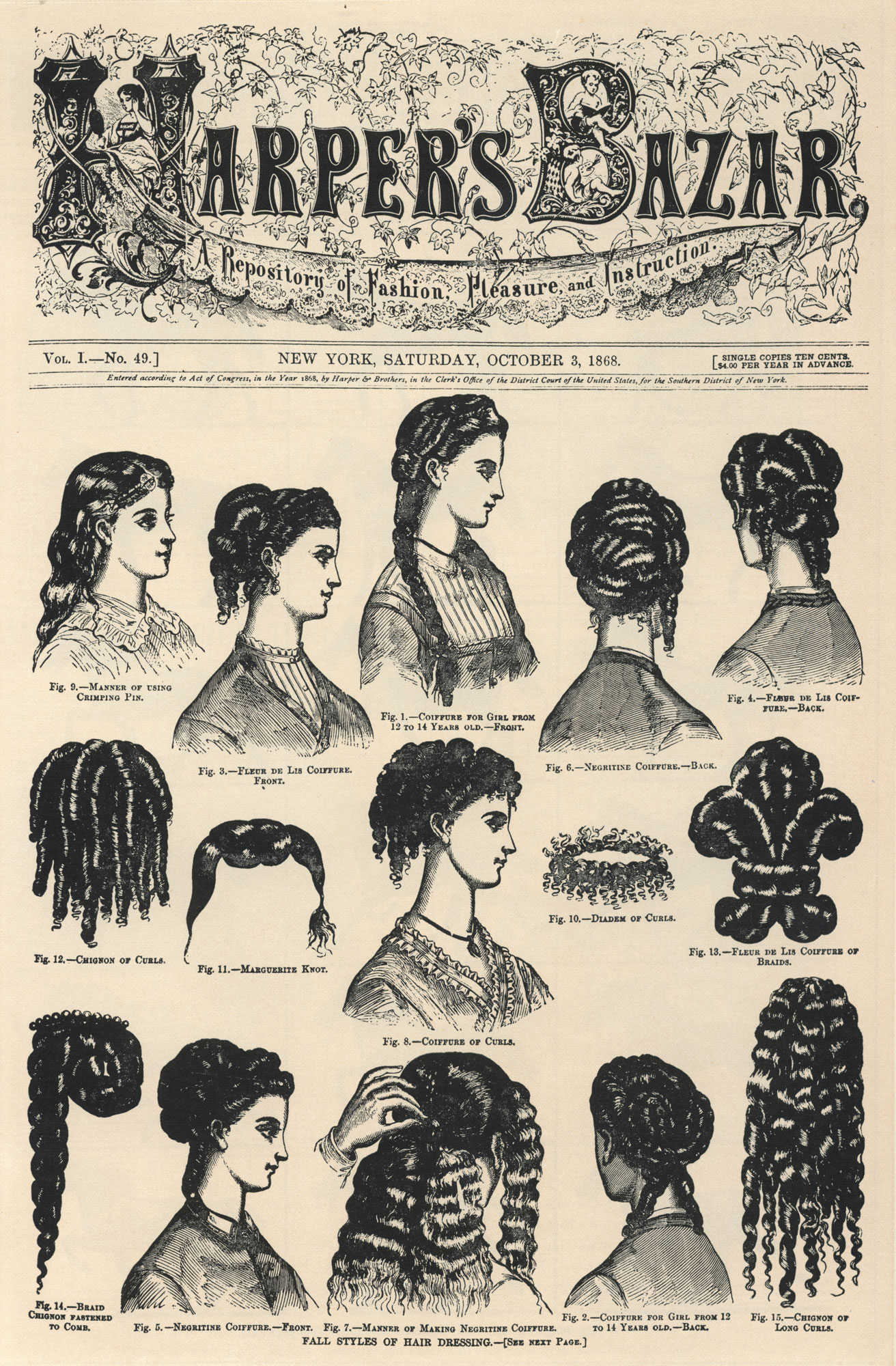
Harper's Bazaar (1868)

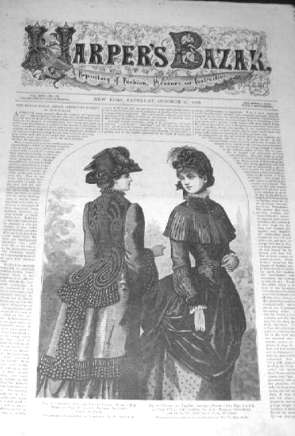
Harper's Bazaar (1883)

== Personal life ==
She lived in New York City, in the neighborhood of Central Park, in a house which Booth owned, with her longtime companion, Mrs. Anne W. Wright, a friendship that was begun in childhood. Their house was well-adapted to entertaining. There were always guests, and in the salon, every Saturday night, there was an assemblage of authors, singers, players, musicians, statesmen, travelers, publishers, and journalists.

Booth died in New York after a short illness on March 5, 1889.
