= History of Dunfermline Athletic F.C. =

Scottish football club history

Dunfermline Athletic F.C. is a Scottish football club based in Dunfermline. Formed on 2 June 1885, the club first joined the Scottish Football League in 1912, participating in the Scottish Football League Second Division. The club were promoted to the top division of Scottish football for the first time in 1926, though they spent the majority of their first forty years in the second tier.

The club's greatest period came during the 1960s under the guidance of two managers, Jock Stein (1960–1964) and George Farm (1967–1970). Stein, best known as the long-serving manager of Celtic, guided the Pars to their first Scottish Cup victory in 1961 and brought European football to East End Park, with Dunfermline playing their first European match against St Patrick's Athletic in the UEFA Cup Winners' Cup in 1961. Farm continued this legacy, overseeing further adventures in European football, as well as the Pars most recent Scottish Cup win in 1968.

While that level of success has not been maintained since the 1960s, the club has continued to challenge for honours in Scottish football, appearing in the 2006 Scottish League Cup Final, as well as the 2004 and 2007 Scottish Cup Finals.

== Nineteenth century ==
=== Beginning (1874–1899) ===
Dunfermline Football Club was formed in 1874, when members of Dunfermline Cricket Club decided to establish a football section with the intention of maintaining fitness during the winter. A dispute over club membership caused some members to split away from Dunfermline Cricket Club, which resulted in the creation of Dunfermline Athletic Football Club on 2 June 1885. The club became the principle football club in Dunfermline and their first twenty-five years saw them compete primarily as an amateur team until they turned professional in 1899.

== Twentieth century ==
=== (1900–1959) ===
Having competed in minor local and national cups, Dunfermline first entered into the Scottish Football League in 1912 where they took part in the Scottish Division Two. The second tier was disbanded during World War I, and when it was not re-instated in 1919 when the conflict ended, Dunfermline were one of several clubs who joined the 'rebel' Central Football League, and were able to attract some top players due to being outwith the SFL's wage rules: Andy Wilson, who had made wartime international appearances, was the most prominent of these and he gained his first six official caps for Scotland while with the club. In 1921 the Central League and its members were absorbed into the SFL. The following years up until World War II saw the club achieve little success, with the side most frequently playing in the second tier, with occasional appearances in the top flight.

Bobby Ancell was offered the manager's post in 1950 but with the Pars making headlines for board room disputes, he declined the offer. With a new board in place two seasons later, Ancell was offered the position again and this time accepted. Improving year on year Ancell delivered promotion back to the top flight in 1955 before leaving to start a decade at Motherwell.

=== The golden age (1960–1969) ===

1968 Scottish Cup Final starting line-up.

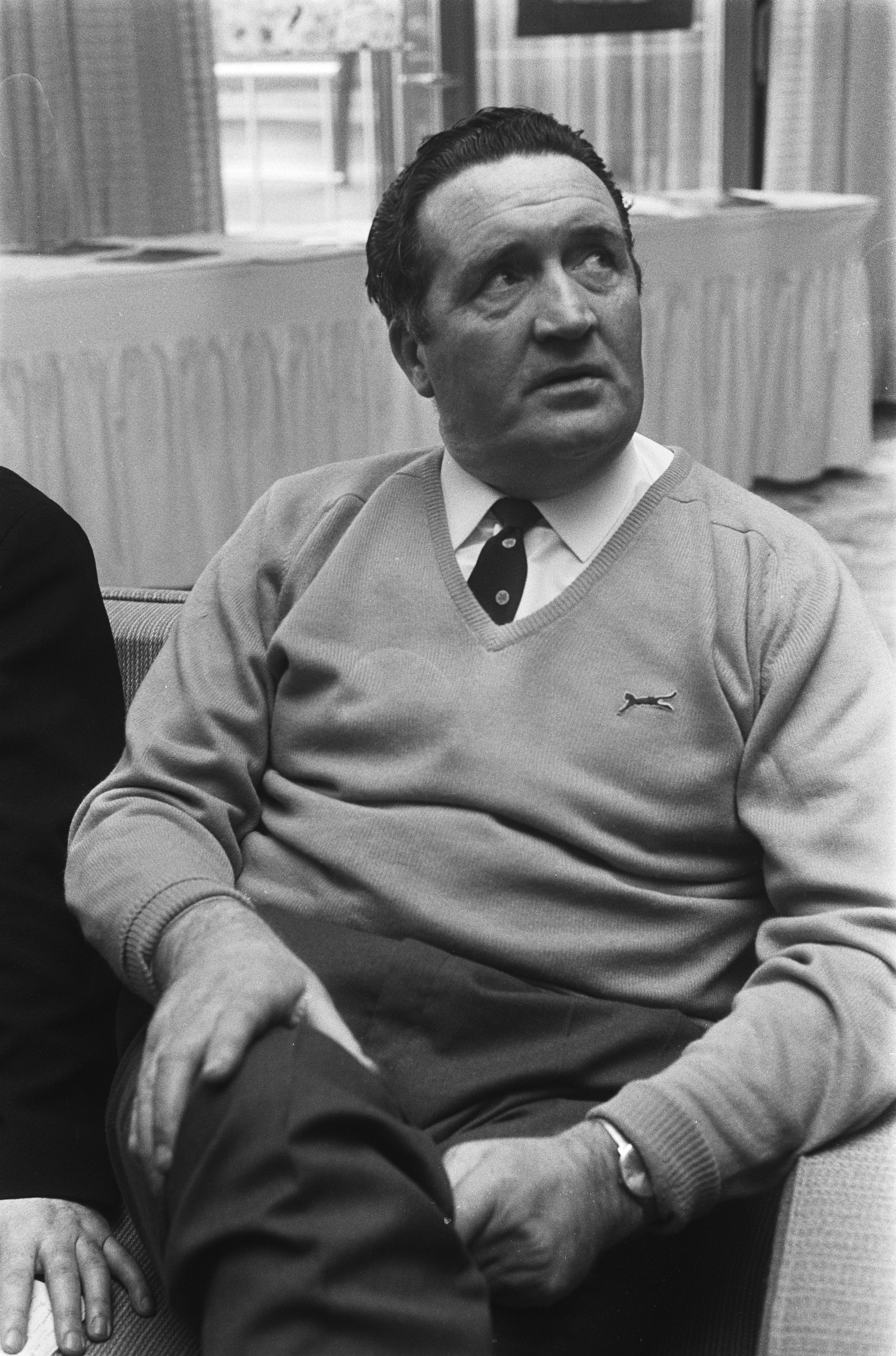
Jock Stein, Dunfermline manager from 1960 to 1964

Jock Stein became manager in 1960 and so began the club's golden decade. The club played regular European football in the UEFA and European Cup Winners Cups throughout the 60s (and also early 70s). Under Stein Dunfermline won the Scottish Cup in the 1960–61 season. They beat Celtic 2–0 in the final after a replay. In 1962 they reached the Cup-Winners Cup quarter finals, losing 5–3 on aggregate to Újpest Dózsa SC. On the way they beat St Patrick's Athletic and FK Vardar. In the 1962–63 season Dunfermline beat Everton in the Fairs Cup and then played Valencia, losing 4–0 away before winning 6–2 at home. The Pars lost the subsequent play-off. Stein left in 1964 to join Hibernian.

New manager Willie Cunningham took the club to the Scottish Cup final in the 1964–65 season. They lost the final 3–2 to a Celtic team that was at the beginning of new manager Jock Stein's era. The Pars finished 3rd in the league, one point behind top two Kilmarnock and Hearts. The following year Cunningham took Dunfermline to the Inter-Cities Fairs Cup quarter-finals. Alex Ferguson was a player in the Dunfermline squad between 1964 and 1967.

George Farm was manager from 1967 until 1970. He matched Stein by winning the Scottish Cup in 1968 with a 3–1 win in the final against Hearts. Farm then surpassed Stein and took the club to their greatest achievement to date, the semi-final of the European Cup Winners Cup in season 1968–69, losing 2–1 on aggregate to eventual winners Slovan Bratislava (Slovan beat FC Barcelona in the final). On the way to the semi-final Dunfermline beat APOEL, Olympiacos and West Bromwich Albion.

=== Lower leagues (1970–1993) ===
Dunfermline, managed by Pat Stanton started the 1980s in poor form. The core of the team were Pars stalwarts, Dr Hugh Whyte in goal, John Salton, Kenny Thomson and Dr Bobby Robertson in defence and Sandy McNaughton up front. Of this quintet only Salton was not an ever-present in the league campaign. The team developed a habit of losing streaks, 2 of five games and 2 of three games and this caused relegation nerves. They hovered in third bottom position for most of the last third of the season, only being saved by the ineptitude of the Stirling Albion side who failed to score in their last thirteen games and by Berwick Rangers who had held up the division for most of the season.

The Athletic made some headway in the 1981–82 season to mid table. Their home form let them down, only achieving three victories against St Johnstone, Queen's Park and East Stirlingshire whereas they won eight games on their travels. They were still over-reliant on 13 goal top-scorer Sandy McNaughton (in his last season at East End Park) but Grant Jenkins chipped in with 7. Team new boy, Norrie McCathie, signed in a swap deal from Cowdenbeath, scored 4 in his 19 appearances on his way to clocking up a club record of 497 league appearances before his death in 1996. Kenny Thomson and Bonar Mercer, both long servants, were freed at the end of the season. The team physio, Jimmy Stevenson retired after more than a quarter of a century of service.

In the 1982–83 season the team were poor throughout and in the drop zone almost constantly, especially after the New Year's Day hammering by Raith Rovers. A change of manager was inevitable and manager Stanton left to go to Hibernian. New manager, Tom Forsyth tried 29 players during the league campaign but never found a settled formation. McNaughton was gone and the lack of goals proved fatal, relegation to the lower Division was inevitable. The only bright spot in the whole season was the 2–1 home victory in February over Hearts. Off the pitch, the death of long-time director Andrew Watson was another low point.

A fresh season beckoned with a poor start with only three wins by the end of October caused yet another change of manager with the resignation of Tom Forsyth. The reserve team coach with no managerial experience was chosen from a long line of candidates. Jim Leishman had a strong Dunfermline pedigree, as a boy he had watched the 1960s Pars legends in European games and had progressed through the youth ranks to first team football before his playing career was ended by a bad leg break. The team initially continued to struggle under Leishman but he signed John Watson from Hong Kong Rangers for £300, in what proved to be a good move for the club. An otherwise uneventful 1983–84 season ended with a brief flourish and a final 9th position in Division 2. Hugh Whyte was the only ever-present and Stephen Morrison was the top league scorer with a meagre 9 goals.

The 1984–85 season opened in dramatic fashion. Six straight wins took the Pars to the top of the league with John Watson, Grant Jenkins and Norrie McCathie scoring well. The defence had been strengthened with the arrival of Dave Young at centre half. Good form lasted until October when the team hit a sticky patch which lasted until February. They managed one solitary victory over local rivals Cowdenbeath in November during this period and surrendered top spot to Alloa. The end of the league competition was closely fought but Montrose snatched the championship, with Alloa runners-up and Dunfermline third. Hugh Whyte, after long service since 1976, played his final league game of the season with a clean sheet against Stenhousemuir in March. Ian Westwater took over the goalkeeping mantle. The team scored 61 goals over the course of the season, John Watson leading the way with 15 but Grant Jenkins with 9, Norrie McCathie and Stevie Morrison with 8 each showed a great improvement on previous years.

To mark the Centenary a special game was arranged with Aberdeen as the visitors. Ian Heddle scored to seal a 1–0 victory.

Chart of yearly table positions of Dunfermline in the Scottish League.

The 1985–86 season league campaign opened with no major close season signings. An early defeat in the third week of the season when the Pars lost 3–1 at Hampden to Queen's Park was followed with a long unbeaten run from September until mid-January. The attack were scored well, putting six past Albion Rovers and four past St Johnstone, East Stirlingshire and Berwick Rangers (twice). Six other games ended with the opposition picking the ball out of the net three times. The fixture list was badly disrupted during the three winter months with Dunfermline only managing to play six games. Three victories were not enough and the Pars surrendered the number one position to Queen of the South. The Pars maintained second place during eight league matches in March and April. Dunfermline suffered consecutive away defeats in early April to Queen of the South and Meadowbank Thistle. This was followed with three 4–0 home wins against Albion Rovers, St Johnstone and East Stirlingshire, a 2–0 win at East End Park over Arbroath and then a 4–0 victory at Shielfield Park, Berwick that had taken the Pars back to the top of the league. The last two fixtures were both away, the attack failed to score at Stenhousemuir in a 0–0 draw and the final game was at Stirling Albion. The Pars scored first but ended up losing 3–2. Fortunately for Dunfermline, nearest rivals Queen of the South also suffered in the final run-in, drawing two and losing two games. This meant that Dunfermline were promoted along with Queen of the South from the Scottish league's third tier to the second tier. No player was ever-present, Ian Westwater and Dave Young missing only one game each and Norrie McCathie only missing two games. On the scoring front, the Pars netted 91 times in the league. John Watson was top with 24 goals and Ian Campbell was next with 15 and Grant Jenkins with 14 goals.

1986–87 commenced with the visit of Forfar, the Pars squeezed a 1–0 win with a goal from John Watson and were up and running. Three more wins followed and the newly promoted men were top of the league. Their next visitors were East Fife who were yet to win in their start to the season. The form book was turned on its head with East Fife racing into a 3–0 half-time lead. Dunfermline scored two in the second half but the visitors added another to triumph 4–2. David Moyes was substituted and this was to be the final appearance in his brief Dunfermline career. Ian Heddle was introduced to the line up in subsequent games and the Pars returned to form, won the next three games and drew the subsequent two. The second of which was against league leaders Airdrieonians. A crowd of more than 5000 watched a 0–0 draw. Hugh Whyte had to temporarily return between the posts for the next two games to cover for Ian Westwater, keeping a clean sheet in a 1–0 victory over Montrose but losing three in a draw in his final appearance at Forfar. The team were struggling to maintain consistency and their best form but kept in touch at the top of the league. Early leaders Airdrie were also losing form and were never to recover. Dunfermline had a poor November with wins over Kilmarnock and Montrose balanced by defeats at East Fife (again) and Airdrie and a home 2–2 draw with Queen of the South. Athletic managed to climb their way to the top of the league and were to stay there until the end of April. The season ended poorly with five defeats in the last eight games with Morton snatching the championship. Second place meant promotion again and the promise of matches against Scotland's top division teams in 1987–88. Norrie McCathie was the only ever-present. John Watson was the top scorer for the third year running with a more modest 13 goals. Ian McCall, in his first season, bagged eight and caught the eye of a number of clubs.

In the 1987–88 season, Dunfermline knocked Rangers, who were managed by Graeme Souness, out of the Scottish Cup in the 4th round with a 2–0 home victory. Mark Smith and John Watson scored goals early in each half. John Brown was sent off for Rangers.

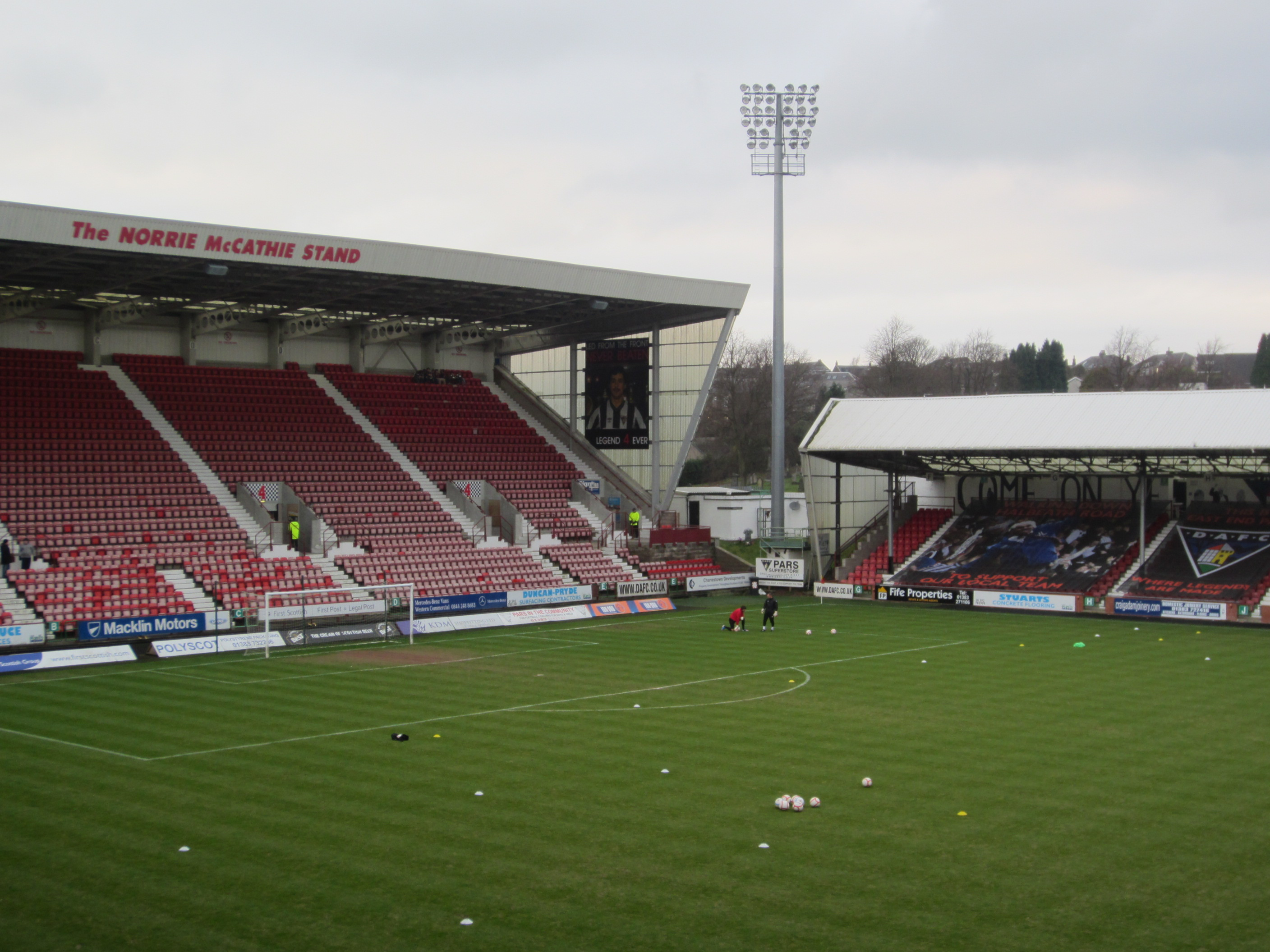
The Norriw McCathie stand in 2013

Athletic opened the new league season with a 3–3 draw against Hibernian at East End Park. Central defender David Young scored two but didn't score again all season. Two away draws at Paisley and Falkirk followed before Celtic provided the first Old Firm visitors of the season. Craig Robertson opened the scoring, Andy Webster equalised from the spot for the Hoops before Eric Ferguson provided the winner giving Celtic one of only three defeats they suffered that season. Ian McCall was immediately sold for a club record £200,000 transfer fee to Rangers. In the next match the Pars travelled to Dens Park and slumped to a 5–0 defeat, their heaviest loss of the whole season. From then on points were hard to come by. Highlights were hard to find, three wins over bottom club Morton and two over St Mirren. A narrow 1–0 win over Hibernian and a fighting 2–2 draw at Ibrox in December gave a brief respite before eight consecutive league defeats. The bad run ended with a 6–1 victory over Dundee at East End Park to avenge the heavy loss earlier in the season. Overall the Pars used from many team changes and never had a settled side including to using five goalkeepers; Ian Westwater managed 28 appearances but Tom Carson, Nicky Walker, David McKellar and Hans Segers took their turn between the posts. Nobody managed to be ever present, Craig Robertson, who had arrived in midfield at the start of the season, was nearest only missing two games. This helped him to top scorer position with 13 goals. Relegation back to the First Division followed during league re-construction meant that three teams were going down. Morton and Falkirk also faced the drop. David Young and Bobby Forrest left the club and Bobby Robertson retired having made a record 360 league appearances. Amongst the new faces, Ross Jack showed promise up front with four goals.

=== Bert Paton era (1993–1999) ===
The 1995–96 season featured a Scottish First Division championship title and automatic promotion to the Scottish Premier Division, after losing out to Aberdeen in a play-off the previous season. However it was also the season when the club's then-captain and all-time great player Norrie McCathie died suddenly at the age of 34 of carbon monoxide poisoning. The team went on to remain in the Scottish Premier League until 1999, when they were briefly relegated to the Scottish First Division for one season.

East End Park, which had been the Pars home ground since their beginning in 1885, was redeveloped and converted to an all-seater stadium with a capacity of 12,509, with the West stand being renamed the Norrie McCathie stand of their late captain.

== Twenty-first century ==
=== Scottish Premier League (2000–2007) ===
Dunfermline's seven-year stay in the Scottish Premier League delivered mixed results. The 2002–03 season saw them finish 5th, their highest position yet with Stephen Crawford scoring 19 goals. The following season, Dunfermline did even better finishing in fourth place as well as reaching the 2004 Scottish Cup Final, which also saw them qualify for the UEFA Cup.

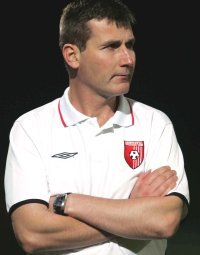
Stephen Kenny, Dunfermline manager from 2006 to 2007

It was at this point of relative success for the provincial club that saw manager, Jimmy Calderwood and assistant Jimmy Nicholl leave the club to join rivals Aberdeen. This coincided with a downfall in the fortunes of the club. In 2004–2005 under the newly appointed David Hay the team ended up in the lower half of the SPL and Hay being sacked. Jim Leishman was promoted to the manager's job for a second spell and during the last 3 games of the season, guided the team to safety avoiding relegation.

A year later brought another poor season during 2005–06 including an 8–1 home defeat to Celtic in February 2006, Dunfermline's worst defeat since the formation of the SPL in 1998. This was in a season when the Pars also reached the final of the League Cup, losing 3–0 to Celtic at Hampden Park.

The 2006–07 season proved to be a bad start and Leishman returned to his job as Director of football with Stephen Kenny being appointed as the new manager in October 2006. However he could not turn round the fortunes of the club nor repeat Calderwood's success in the league as neither could the previous two managers.

Dunfermline were relegated from the Scottish Premier League on 12 May 2007 after losing 2–1 against Inverness Caledonian Thistle. Jim McIntyre had put the Pars one nil up after 37 minutes, but two late goals from Caley Thistle sealed Dunfermline's relegation to the First Division. Dunfermline lost their 3rd major final in four years (losing the 2007 Scottish Cup Final to Celtic 27 May). Since Celtic had already qualified for Europe by winning the SPL, Dunfermline were able to compete in the 2007–08 UEFA Cup, thus managing the feat of being relegated and qualifying for Europe in the same season.

=== Return to the First Division (2007–2011) ===
After relegation to the First Division, Dunfermline lost two of their main players in goalkeeper Dorus de Vries who signed for Welsh side Swansea City and midfielder Gary Mason who opted to stay in the SPL with St Mirren. After losing the opening game of the season 2–1 to Hamilton Academical, the Pars played against a Manchester United XI in Scott Thomson's testimonial match, losing 4–0. Their first UEFA Cup match since defeat against FH Hafnarfjörður in 2004 came against Swedish Superettan team BK Häcken at home where they drew one all. The return leg was played in Gothenburg two weeks later. Dunfermline lost the game 1–0, losing 2–1 on aggregate.

Dunfermline continued to play badly and it took four games for them to record their first win back down on Scotland's second tier. The team found themselves in 9th position after only 7 games, recording only one win. One positive aspect of the new season was the team managing to get to the final of the Challenge Cup beating Clyde, Airdrie and Ayr United on the way. On 25 November The Pars were defeated 3–2 by St Johnstone at Dens Park. The date of the final was changed from 4 November to the 25th because it would have required the postponement of First Division games involving the pair.

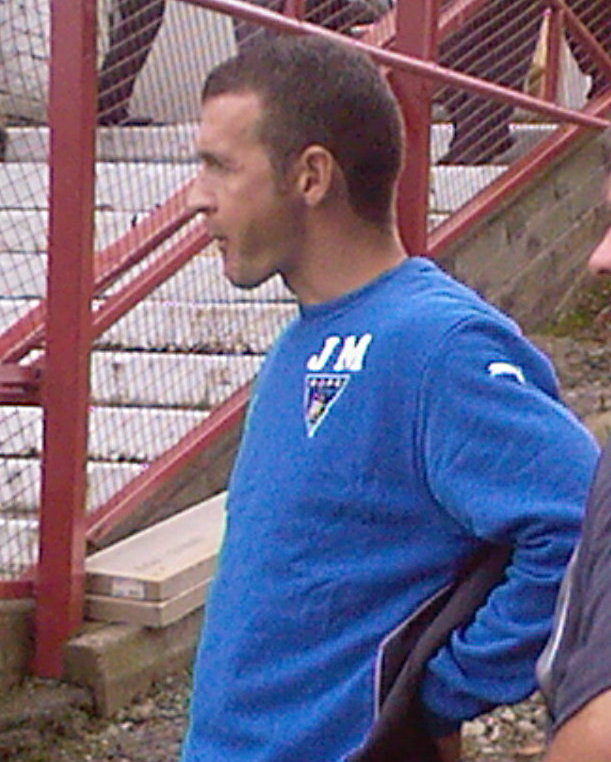
Jim McIntyre, Dunfermline manager from 2007 to 2012

After one year in charge, Stephen Kenny's Dunfermline side languished near the bottom of the First Division Table. On 4 December 2007, Kenny was sacked as Dunfermline Athletic manager. Striker Jim McIntyre took charge as Caretaker manager of the club. Mcintyre's first match in charge was a home clash against Clyde on 8 December 2007. The Pars managed to scrape a one all draw. After going six games undefeated, McIntyre was appointed as Dunfermline manager on a full-time basis on 3 January 2008, signing a two-and-a-half-year deal. In late March 2008, local newspaper Dunfermline Press announced that Dunfermline Athletic were going into administration. The newspaper claimed they had a "credible" source but this source could not be substantiated. Dunfermline Athletic later made a statement saying that the claims made by the newspaper were false and that they were "disappointed" by the article. After languishing near the bottom of the table for the first half of the season, the Fife side managed to improve their results after Jim McIntyre was brought in, finishing 5th in the league after 36 games.

The following season, despite a positive start, Dunfermline failed to challenge for promotion again – ending the campaign fourteen points adrift of champions St Johnstone. However, a late rally did see them finish third on fifty-one points from their thirty-six games.

Jim McIntyre's second full season in charge of Dunfermline started in much the same way as the previous season, with The Pars again gaining only nine points from the first eight matches. Similarly to the previous season, a late improvement saw the side collect seven wins in their final ten games, however this was not enough to ensure promotion for Dunfermline and saw them again finish in third position, this time fifteen points behind champions Inverness Caledonian Thistle.

=== SPL, relegation and financial difficulties (2011–2013) ===
The next season, Dunfermline found themselves top after six games. From then on, they never fell outside the top two, spending the majority of their time in second. Dunfermline's home and away form throughout the season saw them only lose once at home (1–3 against Morton) and gain the most points away from home in the division. After a decisive home win over closest rivals Raith Rovers by 2–1 the week before in front of a capacity crowd of over 11,000, Dunfermline clinched the 2010–2011 First Division championship and promotion to the Scottish Premier League following a 2–0 away win over Morton on 30 April 2011. The final match of the season was at home to Falkirk, where they won 3–0. After the game they were presented with the First Division Trophy in front of their fans. This meant that they ended the season with a twelve-game unbeaten run and six consecutive wins, and 10 points ahead of second-placed Raith Rovers. In March 2012, with Dunfermline bottom of the SPL with 19 points, eight games without a victory and no wins at home all season, manager Jim McIntyre was sacked by the club and replaced with Jim Jefferies. Dunfermline's first home win of the season was a 3–0 victory against Aberdeen on 28 April 2012. However, on 7 May 2012, Dunfermline were relegated from the SPL after a 4–0 defeat against Hibernian.

The Pars started brightly in the first few matches of the 2012–13 season, winning 6 of their first 7 matches however the club failed to pay the players' October wages on time and in November 2012, reports arose that there were unpaid tax bills due to HM Revenue and Customs. Chairman John Yorkston was adamant that any outstanding debt could be cleared, however further issues arose over the coming months as it was reported in December, January and February that players were paid late, and reduced wages, prompting the squad to lodge an official complaint with the SFL. In mid-February, the club announced it would launch their share issue, but it was cancelled at the last minute.

With the club facing a winding up order over unpaid tax of £134,000 on 26 March 2013, Dunfermline Athletic Football Club announced that the club would be put into voluntary administration, with accountancy firm PKF appointed administrators, and it was formally approved by the court the following day. Bryan Jackson, who was appointed to oversee the administration proceedings, announced on 28 March that eight players, including captain Jordan McMillan were to be made redundant, however manager Jefferies stayed, on the condition that his salary would be reduced. Assistant manager Gerry McCabe was also made redundant the following day. Players made redundant only had until 31 March to find new clubs, as this was the last day of player registrations for the 2012–13 season. The club's shareholder Gavin Masterton, who was responsible for placing the club in administration, apologised for his action. A week before the club went into administration, Pars Community, the club's largest supporters group, made a bid to buy the club, but the bid was unsuccessful and talks broke down. The club's debt is thought to be around 8.5 million pounds, with most of it owed to Masterton and other directors at the club. Due to being placed in administration, the Scottish Football Association placed sanctions on the club, restricting the club to signing only players under the age of 21, banning them from playing in the Scottish Cup and deducting 15 points. This points deduction resulted in the club being brought into the relegation struggle, and, on the final day of the season, after losing 1–2 to Airdrie United, the club ended the season in ninth place, the playoff position. They were subsequently relegated after losing the play-off final.

=== Scottish League One (2013–2016) ===
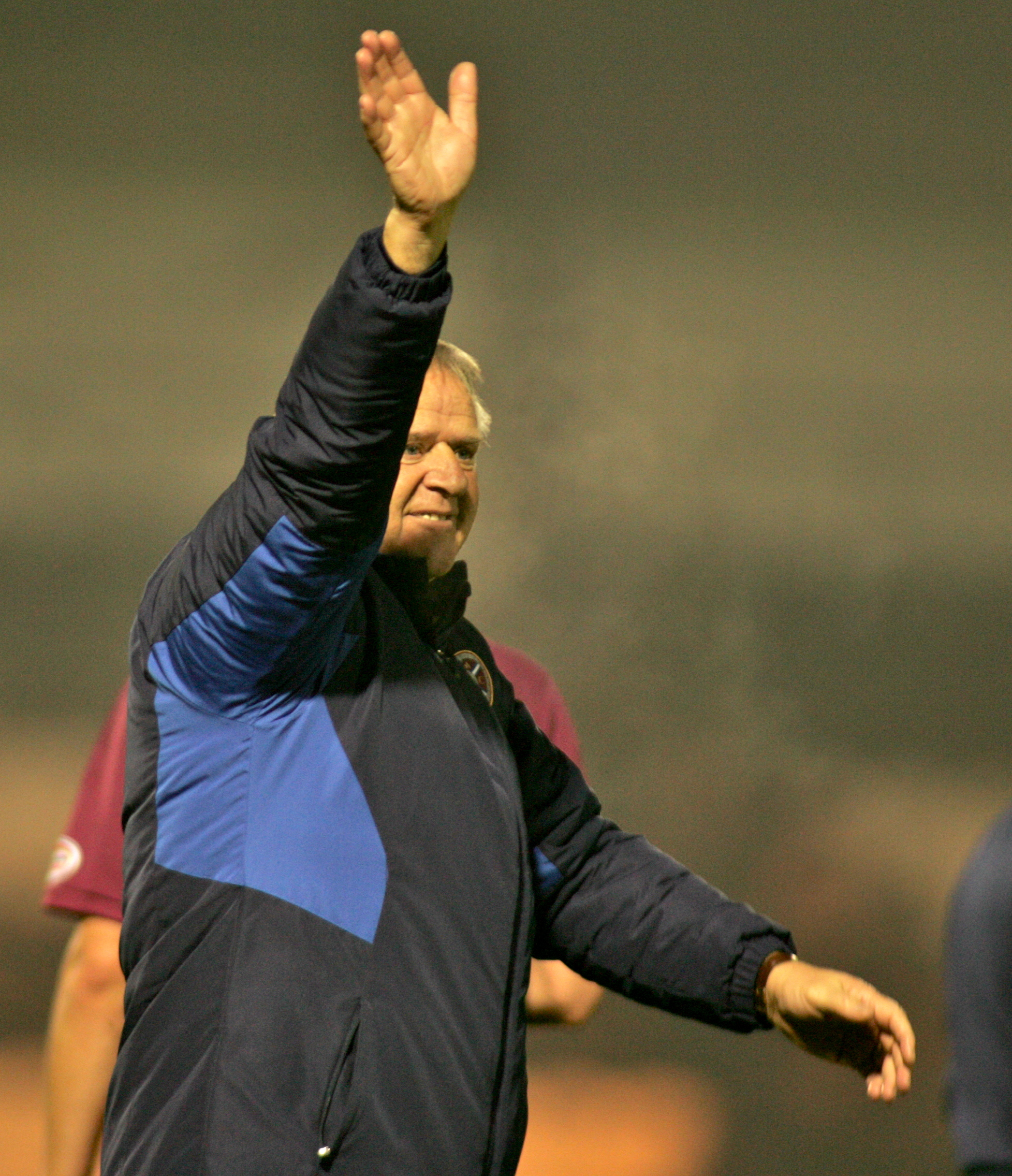
Jim Jefferies, Dunfermline manager from 2012 to 2014

Following their relegation from the Scottish First Division, the club were in Scottish League One (formerly known as the Scottish Second Division). The 2013–14 season started well, with the Pars winning three out of their first five games. Over the course of the season the club won a further sixteen games, drew six and finished the season in second place, forty-nine points behind league champions Rangers. The club participated in the Scottish Championship Play-offs where they successfully dispatched Stranraer 4–2 on aggregate in the semi-final. The play-off final was then set up against local rivals Cowdenbeath. The first leg at Central Park was an even encounter, which ended in a 1–1 draw, meaning that the second leg at East End Park was an absolute decider. Unfortunately for the club, they were defeated 4–0 by Cowdenbeath, with the visitors scoring their first of the match in just twenty-seven seconds. This result ensured that the club would face another season in the Scottish League One.

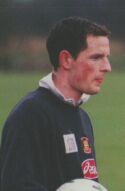
Allan Johnston, Dunfermline manager from 2015 to 2019

The 2014–15 season started well, with the Pars topping the table after the first nine matches. However, by mid-December the club had dropped to fifth place, outside the play-off positions. On 16 December 2014 Jim Jefferies resigned as manager, with under 20's manager John Potter stepping into the role as first team manager. After a poor second half of the season, in which the club finished in seventh position, Dunfermline confirmed on 30 April 2015 that Potter would return to the position of head coach. On 8 May 2015, former Queen of the South and Kilmarnock manager Allan Johnston was appointed as First Team manager of the Pars and tasked with improving on the side's league position for the coming 2015–16 season.

Within a week of taking the position of manager, Johnston had released eighteen players – including twelve first-team players – in order to reduce the club's squad size and allow him to bring in "the right faces" to push for promotion back to the Scottish Championship. After making several high-profile signings including Jason Talbot and Callum Fordyce from Livingston, Ben Richards-Everton from Partick Thistle and Joe Cardle from Ross County, Dunfermline's start to the season consisted of some excellent scoring, with the club winning by 1–4, 5–1, 1–6 and 7–1 against Arbroath, Cowdenbeath, Brechin City and Cowdenbeath again respectively. After defeating Brechin City and promotion rivals Ayr United in December, the side remained at the top of the league for the remainder of the season, finishing 18 points ahead of Peterhead, their closest rivals. On 26 March 2016, it was confirmed that Dunfermline were champions of the league, after a 3–1 victory over Brechin City, with star-player Faissal El Bakhtaoui netting the first hat-trick of his career. This ended their 3-year exodus from the second tier of Scottish football after the club's administration and subsequent relegation in 2013.

=== Scottish Championship (2016–) ===
Following a pre-season which began just 5 weeks after the end of the 2015–16 season, Dunfermline began the 2016–17 season in July 2016 by placing third of five teams in Group C of the newly formatted Scottish League Cup. The clubs first outing in the Scottish Championship came at East End Park, with the team defeating Dumbarton 4–3 on 6 August 2016. Following this, the Pars then went on a poor run of form, taking just 4 points from the next 9 matches, leaving them in 8th position after the first round of fixtures. The sides on-field performances improved considerably between November and February, where they recorded just one defeat (against Dundee United) in all competitions, finding themselves 6th in the league, 6 points above the relegation play-off position and 13 points ahead of St Mirren in 10th.

== Sources ==
- Paterson, Jim; Scott, Douglas (1984). Black & White Magic. Dunfermline.
- Dunkerley, Stephen (2015). Into the Valley: an East End odyssey. Dunfermline.
