= Whyte (surname) =

- Pronunciation: Why-t

Origin
- Origin: Latin
- Meaning: a color devoid of other colors

Other names
- Variant forms: White (surname); Wight (surname)

Whyte is a surname and an older English spelling of White, and may refer to:

- Alain Whyte, English guitarist, singer, and songwriter
- Alexander Whyte, Scottish divine
- Sir Alexander Frederick Whyte, (1883–1970) British politician
- Alison Whyte, Australian actress
- Angela Whyte, Canadian athlete
- Archie Whyte, Scottish footballer
- Arthur Mornington Whyte (1921–2014), Australian politician
- Chris Whyte, English footballer
- Christopher Whyte (writer), Scottish writer
- Cosmo Whyte (born 1982), Jamaican-born American artist
- Craig Whyte, Scottish businessman
- David Whyte (footballer), English footballer
- Derek Whyte, Scottish footballer
- Dillian Whyte, boxer
- Edna Gardner Whyte (1902–1992) American aviator
- Frederick Methvan Whyte, American mechanical engineer
- George Whyte-Melville, Scottish novelist and poet
- Graham Whyte, engineer
- Harcourt Whyte (1905–1977), Nigerian composer
- Heather Stewart-Whyte (born 1968), British model
- Hugh Whyte (1955–2009), Scottish footballer
- Hugh F. Durrant-Whyte, known for his pioneering work on probabilistic methods for robotics
- Ian Whyte (disambiguation), multiple people
- Ibubeleye Whyte, Nigerian footballer
- Jack Whyte, Scottish-Canadian novelist of historical fiction
- James Whyte (disambiguation), multiple people
- Jamie Whyte, New Zealand politician
- Jim Whyte (footballer), Scottish footballer
- Joe Whyte, sports podcaster
- John Whyte (disambiguation), multiple people
- Kathleen Whyte (1909–1996), Scottish embroiderer and teacher
- Kenneth Whyte, Canadian newspaper and magazine editor
- Kerrith Whyte Jr. (born 1996), American football player
- Kye Whyte (born 1999), British BMX racer
- Lancelot Law Whyte, Scottish financier and industrial engineer
- Laura Whyte, American actress, known for The Shopping Bag Lady
- Liam Whyte (1926/1927–2019), Irish Fine Gael politician
- Louis Whyte, Australian sportsman
- Malcolm Whyte, American author, editor, publisher
- Margaret Whyte (born 1940), Uruguayan artist
- Margaret Whyte (1868–1946), Australian medical practitioner
- Oliver Whyte (born 2000), New Zealand footballer
- Pat Whyte, West Indian cricket umpire
- Peter Whyte, Australian rules footballer
- Peter and Catharine Whyte, Canadian/American painters and philanthropists
- Philip Whyte, Scottish footballer
- Ron Whyte (1941–1989), American playwright, critic, and disability-rights activist
- Ronald M. Whyte, American jurist
- Rosemarie Whyte, Jamaican athlete
- Rowland Whyte, Elizabethan English letter writer
- Scott Whyte, American actor
- Sean Whyte (Canadian football), Canadian football player
- Sean Whyte (ice hockey), Canadian hockey player
- Steven Whyte, English sculptor
- Thomas Whyte (academic), 16th century Oxford academic
- William Whyte (disambiguation), multiple people
- Zack Whyte, American jazz bandleader
- Patrick Whyte, Irish American actor
