= Air Twister =

2022 video game

- Developer: YS Net
- Publishers: YS Net (iOS/macOS); ININ Games (Consoles/Windows)
- Director: Yu Suzuki
- Producer: Yu Suzuki
- Composer: Valensia
- Platforms: iOS; macOS; Nintendo Switch; PlayStation 4; PlayStation 5; Windows; Xbox One; Xbox Series X/S
- Release: iOS, macOS; June 24, 2022; PS4, PS5, Switch, Windows, Xbox One, Xbox Series X/S; November 10, 2023
- Genre: Rail shooter
- Mode: Single-player

Air Twister is a rail shooter video game developed and published by YS Net and released on June 24, 2022, for iOS and macOS via Apple Arcade. The developer later partnered with ININ Games to release the game on the Nintendo Switch, PlayStation 4, PlayStation 5, Xbox One, Xbox Series X/S and Microsoft Windows of which these versions were released on November 10, 2023.

== Development ==
In 2008, Yu Suzuki created his video game incubation studio YS Net. The studio has produced a few small scale mobile games and the kickstarter funded console game Shenmue III. Air Twister was the studio's first big budget internationally released smart phone game.

A 3-D Space Harrier concept for smart phones was first shared by Suzuki with Polygon in a 2015 interview. However, he is reluctant to call Air Twister a spiritual successor to Space Harrier.

For Air Twister, Suzuki took inspiration from numerous sources: vintage floppy disc games Mystery House, the Ultima series, to other Sega rail shooters, namely Panzer Dragoon and Tetsuya Mizuguchi's Rez.

Upon release, there were many game modes that were labeled as coming soon; by the end of August 2022, all game modes were available with the release of Version 1.1. The new modes included two new bonus stages in the stardust mode as well as a Turbo mode and an unlockable island in the adventure mode.

== Soundtrack ==
Suzuki, a long time fan of Dutch musician Valensia, reached out to him via Facebook to compose the music, to which he agreed. The soundtrack features 19 tracks. Some tracks are completely new, other tracks are new renditions of known Valensia compositions, including his hit song "Gaia" from his 1993 debut album, Valensia.

== Release ==
The game was released June 24, 2022 on Apple Arcade, and on Nintendo Switch, PlayStation 4, PlayStation 5, Xbox One, Xbox Series X/S and Microsoft Windows on November 10, 2023.
