= Red Album =

Red Album or The Red Album may refer to:

- 1962–1966, a 1973 compilation album by The Beatles also known as "The Red Album"
- Days of the New (2001 album), an album by Days of the New often referred to as "The Red Album"
- Grand Funk (album), a 1969 release by Grand Funk Railroad sometimes called "The Red Album"
- The R.E.D. Album, the fourth studio album by rapper Game in 2011
- Red Album (Baroness album), a 2007 album by Baroness
- Красный альбом (Red Album), a 1987 album by Grazhdanskaya Oborona
- The Red Album, a 2008 album by Cantonese singer Stephy Tang
- Aaliyah (album), a 2001 album by Aaliyah often referred to as "The Red Album"
- Sammy Hagar (album), a 1977 album often referred to as "The Red Album"
- Stone Temple Pilots (album), the band's sixth studio album, also known as "The Red Album"
- Weezer (2008 album), Weezer's third self-titled album, also known as "The Red Album"

== See also ==
- Red (disambiguation), section "Albums"
- The White Album (disambiguation)
