= Whyte =

Whyte may refer to:

- Whyte (surname), a family name
- Whyte, West Virginia
- Whyte notation for steam locomotives
- Saint Wite (died c. 831), also known as Saint Whyte

== See also ==
- White (disambiguation)
- Wight (disambiguation)
