= The White Album (disambiguation) =

The White Album is the popular name for a 1968 self-titled album by the Beatles.

The White Album may also refer to:

== Music ==
- The White Album (band), a Danish folk and pop band
- Dandys Rule OK, a 1995 album by the Dandy Warhols often referred to as the White Album
- Fleetwood Mac (1975 album), a self-titled pop/rock album, often referred to as the White Album
- Lightning to the Nations, a 1980 album by Diamond Head
- The White Album (Hillsong United album), 2014 worship music album
- The White Album (Lewis Black album), 2000 comedy album
- The White Album (Valensia album), 1994 New-age music album
- The White Album (Donnie Vie album), 2014
- Weezer (White Album), a self-titled rock album
- Avenged Sevenfold (album), a self-titled album by American metal band Avenged Sevenfold

== Other uses ==
- The White Album (film), a 2004 documentary starring snowboarder Shaun White
- The White Album (book), a 1979 book of essays by Joan Didion
- White Album (visual novel), a 1998 Japanese adult visual novel
- White Album 2, a 2010 Japanese adult visual novel
- White Album, the stand ability of Ghiaccio, an antagonist in the manga series JoJo's Bizarre Adventure

== See also ==
- The White Albun, a 2004 rock album by TISM
- White (disambiguation)#Arts
- The White EP (disambiguation)
