= Judge White =

Judge White may refer to:

- Albert Smith White (1803–1864), judge of the United States District Court for the District of Indiana
- George Washington White (1931–2011), judge of the United States District Court for the Northern District of Ohio
- Helene White (born 1954), judge of the United States Court of Appeals for the Sixth Circuit
- Jeffrey White (born 1945), judge of the United States District Court for the Northern District of California
- Mastin G. White (1901–1987), judge of the United States Court of Federal Claims
- Robert J. White (judge) (born 1985), judge of the United States District Court for the Eastern District of Michigan
- Ronald A. White (born 1961), judge of the United States District Court for the Eastern District of Oklahoma
- Ronnie L. White (born 1953), judge of the United States District Court for the Eastern District of Missouri
- William White (Ohio judge) (1822–1883), appointed judge of the United States District Court for the Southern District of Ohio, but died before taking office
- William Sylvester White (1914–2004), American judge and member of the Golden Thirteen

== See also ==
- Ronald Whyte
- Justice White (disambiguation)
