= Valensia =

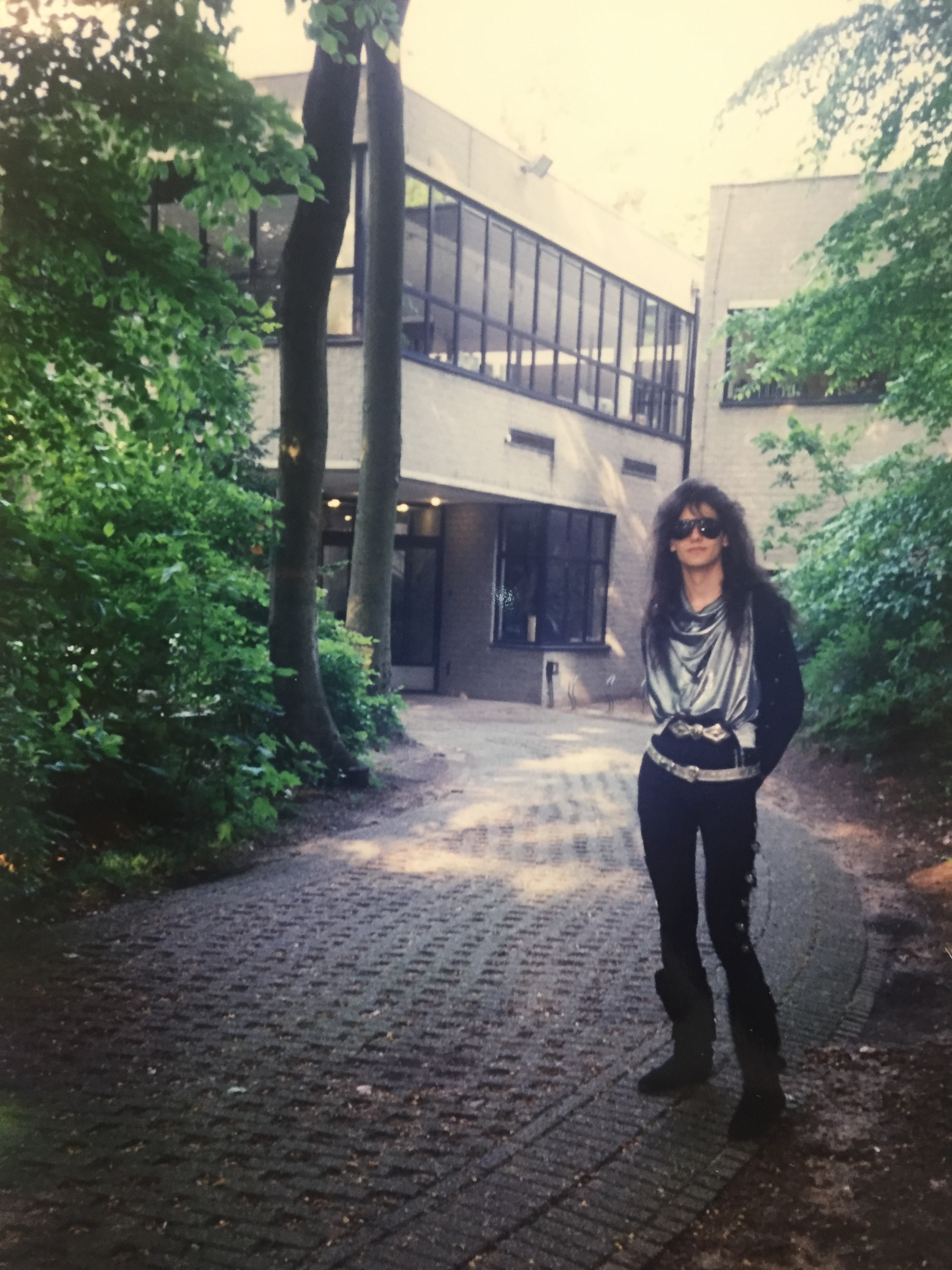
- Valensia at Wisseloord Studios, 1992

Background information
- Also known as: Valensia
- Born: Aldous Byron Valensia Clarkson; April 13, 1971 (age 55)
- Origin: The Hague, Netherlands
- Genres: New-age, hard rock, symphonic rock, progressive rock, Pop Music
- Instruments: Guitar, Piano, Bass
- Years active: 1993–present
- Labels: Phonogram, Polygram Polydor, Universal Music, V2 Records, Marquee Inc.
- Formerly of: V Metal Majesty

Aldous Byron Valensia Clarkson (born April 13, 1971, in The Hague), better known as simply Valensia, is a Dutch composer, producer, singer and multi-instrumentalist.

== Early life ==
Valensia grew up in Waalwijk and used to spend a lot of his time at the family's beachhouse in Dénia, Spain. As a child, he played guitar and sang at the beaches in Dénia. He had also written a lot of songs and was even offered a record contract, but his parents decided he was too young for the music business and refused the offer. Several years later, in the Netherlands, Valensia played in local bands, usually on keyboard or guitar.

== Career ==
=== 1992–1995: Gaia and The White Album ===
Valensia met Robby Valentine (another Dutch singer) at an airport, as they were both listening to Queen´s "Bohemian Rhapsody". After that, Valensia started sending demos to several record companies and producer John Sonneveld noticed him. Then Valensia signed a record deal with Mercury Records and in 1993 his first album Valensia was released.

Influenced by Kate Bush and Queen, Valensia's self-titled first album (known as Gaia in Japan) contained the hit single "Gaia". The song reached No'2 in the Dutch charts and No'2 in Israel as well. "Gaia" had success in other countries too. Four singles were released: "Gaia", "The Sun", "Nathalie" (which peaked at No'4 in Israel) and "Tere".

Soon after the debut album, a mini album called The White Album was released in Japan only. The mini album was released in 1994. It contained 5 tracks, including a Christmas song ("21st Century New Christmas Time") and a cover of Duran Duran's "A View to a Kill".

=== 1996–1998: K.O.S.M.O.S and Valensia '98. ===
Valensia's second album Valensia II (also known as K.O.S.M.O.S) was the first Dutch album recorded in surround sound. The album was produced by John Sonneveld and Pim Koopman (the drummer of Kayak).

Three singles were released: "Kosmos", "Thunderbolt" (only in Japan) and "Blue Rain" (only in the Netherlands).

Valensia's third album was released in 1998. The official name of the album is Valensia '98 Musical Blue Paraphernalian Dreams of Earth's Eventide Whiter Future & Darker Present Soundspheres From New Diamond Age Symphonian Artworks to Yesterday's Westernworld Rockcraft Under the Raging Nineties' Silver Promise of the Happy Hundreds on the Break of the New Millennium's Hazy Misty Dawn. It is also known as Millennium, Valensia '98 and Valensia III. The album was only released in Japan.

=== 1999–2008: Gaia II, V and Metal Majesty ===
In the summer of 1999, V was released. V was a cooperation between Valensia and Robby Valentine.

Valensia's mother Jacqueline died, in November 1999. His next album Gaia II (released on the new record label Marquee) had a song dedicated to his mother, "Requieme pour Jacqueline".

In 2008 Valensia appeared on the Dutch TV program De Reünie. A single entitled "One Day My Princess Will Come" was to be released on February 24, 2010. However, the release was cancelled.

=== 2014–2019: Valensia VI - Gaia III - AGLAEA - Legacy and 7EVE7 ===
On 24 September a new album titled Valensia VI - Gaia III - Aglaea - Legacy was released. Valensia refers to this as "my farewell album". An official music video "The Cabinet of Curiosities" appeared on YouTube.

Being just a temporary farewell, Valensia released a new album called 7EVE7 in 2019.

=== 2022–present: Air Twister ===
In 2022, Valensia re-emerged with the soundtrack for the Yu Suzuki video game Air Twister. The soundtrack features 19 tracks. Some tracks are completely new, other tracks are new renditions of known Valensia compositions, including his hit song "Gaia" from his debut album, Valensia. Suzuki told in several interviews he was a long-time fan of Valensia and was able to get in touch with him on Facebook to pitch him on creating music for the game, to which he agreed.

== Discography ==
=== Studio albums ===
- Valensia (1993)
- Valensia II - K.O.S.M.O.S. (1996)
- V III - Valensia '98 (1998)
- Gaia II (2000)
- The Blue Album (2002)
- Queen Tribute (2003)
- Valensia VI - Gaia III - AGLAEA - Legacy (2014)
- Eden and the Second Serpent (2017)
- The Secret Album (2017)
- 7EVE7 (2019)

=== Soundtrack albums ===
- Air Twister (2022)

=== Mini albums ===
- The White Album (1994)
- Luna Luna (2001)
- Non Plugged (2004)

=== Compilation albums ===
- The Very Best of Valensia (1997)

=== Remix albums ===
- Gaia II.0 (2015)

=== Extended plays ===
- Phantom of the Opera (2000)

=== with V ===
- V (1999)
- Valentine vs Valensia (2002)
- V III - Nymphopsychoschoziphonic (Unreleased)

=== with Metal Majesty ===
- Metal Majesty (2003)
- This is Not a Drill (2004)
- 2005 (2005)
