= Ian White =

Ian White may refer to:

- Ian H. White (born 1959), Northern Irish professor of engineering
- Ian White (darts player) (born 1970), English darts player
- Ian White (footballer) (born 1935), Scottish footballer who played for Leicester City and Southampton in the 1950s and 1960s
- Ian White (ice hockey) (born 1984), Canadian ice hockey player
- Ian White, President of the Methodist Conference for 2002
- Ian White (politician) (born 1945), British Member of the European Parliament
- Ian Herbert White (born 1949), Australian business executive

== See also ==
- Ian White-Thomson (1904–1997), Anglican clergyman
- Ian Whyte (disambiguation)
