= Ian Whyte =

Ian Whyte may refer to:

- Ian Whyte (actor) (born 1971), Welsh actor, stuntman, and former basketball player
- Ian Whyte (conductor) (1901–1960), Scottish conductor
- Ian D. Whyte (1948–2019), British geographer

== See also ==
- Ian White (disambiguation)
