= Colin G. Pooley =

British social geographer

professor Colin G. Pooley

Academic background
- Education: University of Liverpool (BA PhD)
- Thesis: Migration, Mobility and Residential Areas in Nineteenth-Century Liverpool (1979)

Academic work
- Discipline: Geographer
- Institutions: University of Lancaster
- Main interests: Transport and Migration studies

Colin G. Pooley (born 1950) is a specialist in transport and migration studies who is professor emeritus of social and historical geography at the University of Lancaster where he worked from 1975 until 2012.

== Background ==
Alexandra Square, Lancaster University

Pooley was born in Lincolnshire and moved to Liverpool (to university) in 1969. He attended the University of Liverpool, graduating with an honours degree in Geography in 1972 (Rural economy and agricultural change in the upper Itchen Valley, 1500–1800) and PhD in Geography in 1979 (Migration, mobility and residential areas in nineteenth-century Liverpool). He began teaching at Lancaster University in 1975, remaining until retirement and occupying several administrative roles including head of the former Department of Geography. He was associated with the former Centre for North-West Regional Studies, and latterly Lancaster's Centre for Mobilities Research.

== Scholarship ==
Pooley works on the social and historical geography of Britain and continental Europe since the eighteenth century. He began his career investigating housing, health, crime, ethnicity and social change, notably in Liverpool.

His more recent research has been on migration, mobility and sustainable urban travel, with one (2018) project conducting comparative analyses of sustainable urban mobility in Europe, and culture and society from the 1890s to the present. His research techniques have included archival work, travel diaries, policy analysis and qualitative research techniques.

He is the author of numerous volumes and articles on these topics.

== Selected publications ==
- Pooley, C.G.; Johnson, J.H., eds. (1982), The Structure of Nineteenth Century Cities, London: Routledge, ISBN 9780367772086
- Pooley, C.G.; Irish, Sandra (1984), The Development of Corporation Housing in Liverpool, 1869-1945, Resource paper of the Centre for North West Regional Studies, Lancaster: University of Lancaster, ISBN 978-0901272089
- Pooley, C. G.; Whyte, I. D., eds. (1991), Migrants, emigrants and immigrants: A social history of migration, London: Routledge, ISBN 978-103-2000-02-2
- Pooley, C.G.; Lawton, Richard (1992), Britain, 1740-1950: An Historical Geography, London: Hodder Arnold, ISBN 978-0713165500
- Pooley, C. G., ed. (1992), Housing Strategies in Europe, 1800-1930, London: Leicester University Press, ISBN 978-0718514150
- Pooley, C. G. (2001), Space, Time and Society, London: Hodder Education, ISBN 978-0340614006
- Pooley, C. G.; Turnbull, Jean; Adams, Megs, eds. (2005), A Mobile Century? Changes in Everyday Mobility in Britain in the Twentieth Century, London: Routledge, ISBN 9781138259003
- Pooley, C. G.; Turnbull, Jean (2005), Travelling Around Town: Everyday Mobility in Manchester and Salford Since the 1940s, Lancaster: University of Lancaster, ISBN 9781862201552
- Pooley, C. G. (2005), Travelling Around Town: Everyday Mobility in Lancaster and Morecambe Since the 1940s, Lancaster: University of Lancaster
- Pooley, C. G.; Pooley, Sian; Lawton, Richard, eds. (2010), The Diary of Elizabeth Lee: Growing up on Merseyside in the Late Nineteenth Century, Liverpool: Liverpool University Press, ISBN 978-1846311413
- Pooley, C. G., ed. (2013), Promoting walking and cycling, Policy Press, doi:10.5949/UPO9781846315305, ISBN 978-1447310082
- Pooley, C. G. (2017), Mobility, Migration and Transport: Historical Perspectives, London: Palgrave, doi:10.1007/978-3-319-51883-1, ISBN 978-3-319-51883-1
- Pooley, C. and Pooley, M. (2022), Everyday Mobilities in Nineteenth- and Twentieth-Century British Diaries, London: Palgrave Macmillan, ISBN 978-3-031-12683-3
