= The White EP =

The White EP may refer to:

- The White (Agalloch EP), 2008
- The White (William Control EP), 2017
- The White EP (Mirrors EP), 2011
- The White EP (Pop-O-Pies EP), 1982
- The White EP (Vib Gyor EP), 2007
- White EP, part of The Color Spectrum by The Dear Hunter

== See also ==
- The White Album (disambiguation)
- White (disambiguation)
