= Wight (surname) =

- Pronunciation: Why-t

Origin
- Origin: Old English
- Meaning: White, a color devoid of pigment Wright, a worker to make or shape something right Wight, an island off the coast of Great Britain

Other names
- Variant forms: White (surname); Whyte (surname)

Wight is a surname. It is an older English spelling of either Wright (surname) or White (surname), or perhaps denoted an inhabitant of the Isle of Wight.

== People ==
- Andrew Wight (1959–2012), Australian screenwriter and film producer
- Cameron Wight (born 1985), Australian rules footballer
- David Wight (disambiguation), several people
- Dorothea Wight (1944–2013), English artist
- Dylan Wight, Australian politician
- Gail Wight (born 1960), American new media artist
- James Wight, pen name James Herriot (1916–1995), British veterinarian and author
- Lyman Wight (1796 – 1858) Member of the Latter Day Saint
- Martin Wight (1913–1972), British scholar of International Relations
- Orlando Williams Wight (1824–1888), American author
- Paul Wight, ring name Big Show (born 1972), American professional wrestler
- Peter Wight (born 1950), English actor
- Robert Wight (1796–1872), Scottish surgeon and botanist whose standard author abbreviation is Wight
- Rohan Wight (born 1997), Australian cyclist
- Sean Wight (1964–2011), Australian rules football player
- Stephen Wight (born 1980), English actor
- Thomas Wight (died ca. 1608), London publisher.
