= Valensia (album) =

Valensia (also known as "Gaia")

Studio album by Valensia
- Released: 1993
- Studio: Wisseloord
- Genre: Rock, pop
- Length: 47:49
- Label: Mercury
- Producer: John Sonneveld, Pim Koopman

Valensia chronology
Valensia (also known as "Gaia") (1993)	White Album (1994)

Valensia (released in Japan as Gaia) is a 1993 album by Dutch singer Valensia Clarkson. It is Valensia's debut album. The album features Robby Valentine on grand piano ("Nathalie", "T'Kylah", "My Heart Is In Your Hands", "Gaia") and Emmy Verhey on violin ("T'Kylah II", "Gaia").

== Gaia ==
"Gaia" was the first single from the album. In The Netherlands, where the album was recorded, the song is considered to be the most expensive Dutch single in history.

== Track listing ==
1. "Tere"
2. "The Sun"
3. "Scaraboushka"
4. "Nathalie"
5. "Tango Tamara"
6. "T'Kylah II"
7. "T'kylah"
8. "Megalomania"
9. "My Heart Is In Your Hands"
10. "Mr. 1999"
11. "Gaia"
12. "1997"
