= Philip Whyte =

Scottish footballer

Personal information
- Full name: Philip Jasper Whyte
- Place of birth: Aberdeen, Scotland
- Position: Outside right

Senior career*
Years	Team	Apps	(Gls)
1916	Heart of Midlothian	8	(1)
- * Club domestic league appearances and goals

Philip Jasper Whyte was a Scottish professional footballer who played in the Scottish League for Heart of Midlothian as an outside right.

== Personal life ==
Whyte served as a private in the Royal Engineers and the Gloucestershire Regiment during the First World War.

== Career statistics ==
Appearances and goals by club, season and competition
Club	Season	League			National Cup		Total	
Club	Season	Division	Apps	Goals	Apps	Goals	Apps	Goals
Heart of Midlothian	1916–17	Scottish First Division	8	1	—		8	1
Career total			8	1	0	0	8	1
