= White, Washington =

Unincorporated community in Washington, US

- Unincorporated community
- Location in Washington and the United States White (the United States)
- Country: United States
- State: Washington
- County: King
- Elevation: 92 ft (28 m)
- Time zone: UTC-8 (Pacific (PST))
  - Summer (DST): UTC-7 (PDT)
- Area code: 360
- GNIS feature ID: 1512800

White is an unincorporated community in King County, in the U.S. state of Washington.

== History ==
A post office called White was established in 1890, and remained in operation until 1895. The community was named after William H. White, a state judge.
