= The White Album (Valensia album) =

White Album

Studio album by Valensia
- Released: 1994
- Genre: New-age
- Length: 18:49

Valensia chronology
Gaia (1993)	White Album (1994)	K.O.S.M.O.S (1996)

White Album is a 1994 mini-album by Dutch singer Valensia. It was only released in Japan.

== Track listing ==
1. 21st Century New Christmas Time – 4:47
2. The Ex (July July) – 3:32
3. A View to a Kill – 4:44
4. The March of Scaraboushka – 2:33
5. Singing the Swan – 3:01
