= The White Album (band) =

Danish folk pop band

- Origin: Funen, Denmark
- Genres: Folk
- Years active: 2011–present
- Labels: Warner Music
- Members: Frederik Vedersø; Claus Arvad; Jakob Eilsø

The White Album is a Danish folk pop band founded in 2011. The 3-member band is made up of Frederik Vedersø (guitar), Claus Arvad (guitar and mandolin) and Jakob Eilsø (guitar). All members originate from Funen in Denmark. Vedersø is also a singer in the Danish indie band The Eclectic Moniker. The band is signed with Warner Music label.

In 2012, The White Band released their debut EP called Conquistador followed by the studio album The Quiet Strum in 2014 The album reached number 4 on the official Danish Albums Chart. The follow-up album Songs from the Sun was released in 2017.

== Discography ==
=== Albums ===
Year	Album	Peak positions	Certification
Year	Album	DEN	Certification
2014	The Quiet Strum	4	
2017	Songs from the Sun	–	

=== EPs ===
- 2012: Conquistador

=== Singles ===
- 2012: "Conquistador"
- 2016: "One by One"
- 2017: "The Snow"
