= Ian D. Whyte =

British historical geographer (1948–2019)

- Born: 23 January 1948
- Died: September 24, 2019 (aged 71)

Academic background
- Education: University of Edinburgh

Academic work
- Discipline: Geography
- Sub-discipline: Historical Geography
- Institutions: University of Glasgow; University of Lancaster

Ian D. Whyte (23 January 1948 – 24 September 2019) was a British geographer and Professor of Historical Geography at the University of Lancaster. He was the author of many books, including Migrants, Emigrants and Immigrants: A Social History of Migration (1991), Climatic Change and Human Society (1995) and Scotland's Society and Economy in Transition (1997).

== Career ==
Alexandra Square, Lancaster University

Whyte studied for his undergraduate and postgraduate degrees at the University of Edinburgh. His PhD thesis was on Agrarian change in lowland Scotland in the seventeenth century. He was appointed as Lecturer in Geography at Glasgow University and later as Lecturer at Lancaster University in 1979.

Whyte's interest was in the evolution of landscape, economy and society in early-modern Scotland, ranging from agriculture and rural society to urban development. Later, he also extended his research to the study of landscape change and socio-economic changes in the upland areas of Northern England, in particular the process of parliamentary enclosure. He was also keenly interested in issues of landscape and heritage management in the English Lake District.

During his career, he published 17 books and many journal articles. He was appointed to a personal chair in Historical Geography in 1996 and retired in 2012.

Whyte was also involved in developing Lancaster's Centre for North-West Regional Studies and was Editor of the Cumberland and Westmorland Antiquarian and Archaeological Society's journal, Transactions, for several years. He was also a founder Member and Chairman of the Brindle Historical Society.

== Awards ==
Whyte was awarded an Honorary DSc by the University of Edinburgh in 1989 and was awarded an Honorary Fellowship of the Royal Scottish Geographical Society in 1998 for ‘distinguished service to geography in Scotland’.

== Bibliography ==
- Whyte, I. D. (1995), Climatic Change and Human Society, London: Routledge, ISBN 978-103-2002-68-2
- Whyte, I. D. (1997), Scotland's Society and Economy in Transition, Social History in Perspective, London: Red Globe Press, doi:10.1007/978-1-349-25307-4, ISBN 978-1-349-25307-4
- Whyte, I. D. (2000), Landscape and History since 1500, Chicago: University of Chicago Press
- Whyte, I. D. (2002), Landscape and History Since 1500, London: Reaktion Books, ISBN 978-1-86189-138-9
- Winchester, A. J. L.; Whyte, I. D., eds. (2005), Society, Landscape and Environment in Upland Britain, Birmingham: Society for Landscape Studies, ISBN 978-095-3971-11-4
- Whyte, I. D. (2003), Transforming Fell and Valley: Landscape and Parliamentary Enclosure in North West England, Lancaster: University of Lancaster: Centre for North West Regional Studies, ISBN 978-1862-201-32-3
- Pooley, C. G.; Whyte, I. D., eds. (1991), Migrants, emigrants and immigrants: A social history of migration, London: Routledge, ISBN 978-103-2000-02-2
