= Orlando Williams Wight =

American physician

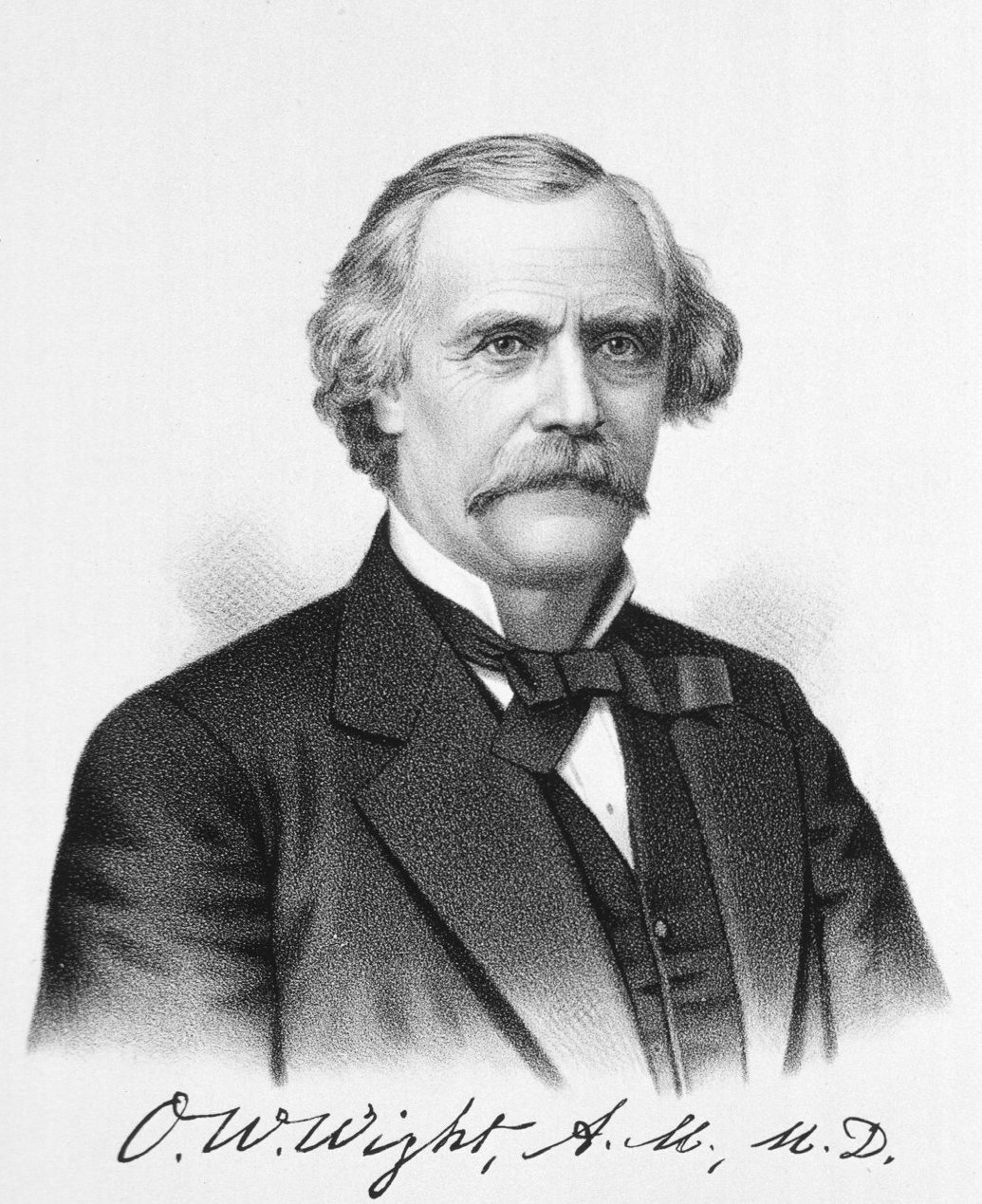
Orlando Williams Wight

Orlando Williams Wight (February 19, 1824 – October 19, 1888) was an American medical doctor and translator.

== Biography ==
Wight was born in Centreville, N. Y. He was educated at the Rochestern College Institute, was ordained as a Universalist clergyman and accepted a call to Newark, New Jersey (1850). Three years later he left the church to engage in literary work. In 1865 he graduated in medicine at the Long Island College Hospital; in 1874 was appointed State geologist and Surgeon General of Wisconsin, and afterward served as health commissioner of Milwaukee (1878–1880) and of Detroit.

== Selected publications ==
- History of Modern Philosophy (translated with F. W. Ricord from the French of Victor Cousin, 1852)
- Life of Abélard and Héloise (1853 and 1861)
- Standard French Classics (fourteen volumes, 1858–1860)
- Pascal's Thoughts (1859)
- The Household Library (18 volumes, 1859 et seq.)
- six volumes of translations from Balzac (1860)
- Henry Martin's History of France (with Mary L. Booth, 1863)
- A Winding Journey Around the World (1888)
