= White hole (disambiguation) =

A white hole is a hypothetical region of spacetime which cannot be entered from the outside, although matter and light can escape from it.

White hole may also refer to:

== Arts and entertainment ==
- "White Hole" (Red Dwarf), an episode of the television series Red Dwarf
- White Hole (film), a 1979 Japanese experimental film by Toshio Matsu
- White Hole, a band formed by Hanno Leichtmann and Nicholas Bussmann
- "The White Hole", an episode of the television series Futurama
