= Wite =

Wite may refer to:

- Gwen Teirbron, a Breton holy woman possibly known in English as Wite
- Saint Wite, a saint who the flag of Dorset's alternate name of Saint Wite's Cross is named after
- Wite, a village on the island of Orangozinho in Guinea-Bissau
- WFNB (AM), which formerly had the callsign of WITE

== See also ==
- White
- Wight
