= Wight, Texas =

Ghost town in Texas, United States

Wight is a ghost town in Crockett County, Texas, United States. It maintained a post office from 1880 to 1883.
