= Kenny Thomson =

Scottish footballer

Personal information
- Full name: Kenny Thomson
- Date of birth: 9 November 1951 (age 74)
- Place of birth: Dunfermline, Scotland
- Position: Defender

Senior career*
Years	Team	Apps	(Gls)
1970–1982	Dunfermline	353	(5)
1982–1988	Alloa Athletic	186	(1)
1987–1990	St Johnstone	94	(1)
1990–1992	Cowdenbeath	21	(0)
Total		654	(7)
- * Club domestic league appearances and goals

Kenny Thomson (born 9 November 1951) is a Scottish former footballer, who played for Dunfermline, Alloa Athletic, St Johnstone and Cowdenbeath. He achieved one of the highest total of Scottish league appearances: 654, between 1970 and 1992.

== Playing career ==
Thomson started playing at Townhill Boys Club Thomson made his Dunfermline debut in August 1970 and despite being part of the team relegating from the first division in 1971-72 he played a part in Dunfermline coming straight back up in 1972-73. After the league restructuring and another relegation Thomson played a key role in the club's promotion in 1979 and was presented with the Dunfermline Player of the Year award. However, he was freed by new manager Pat Stanton in 1982.

Thomson joined Alloa Athletic where he helped them achieve promotion in 1984-85 and later St Johnstone who were promoted to the Premier Division in 1990.

== See also ==
- List of footballers in Scotland by number of league appearances (500+)
