= Kanajjut =

- Location in Nunavut
- Location: Baffin Island, Nunavut
- Coordinates: 62°15′32″N 068°13′39″W
- Type: Inlet
- Ocean/sea sources: Hudson Strait
- Basin countries: Canada

Kanajjut (Inuktitut syllabics: ᑲᓇᔾᔪᑦ), formerly Wight Inlet, is a body of water in Nunavut's Qikiqtaaluk Region. It lies in western Hudson Strait, forming a wedge into Baffin Island's Meta Incognita Peninsula and the western slopes of the Everett Mountains.

It was, for a time, named after Sergeant James Edward Freeman Wight, North-West Mounted Police and Royal Canadian Mounted Police, who had been involved with the arrest of Uloqsaq and Sinnisiak.
