= Hugh Whyte =

Scottish footballer

Hugh Whyte (24 July 1955 – 9 November 2009) was a Scottish football goalkeeper, who played for Hibernian and Dunfermline Athletic.

Whyte, who was born in Kilmarnock, played in the juniors for Hurlford United. Whyte joined Hibernian in 1972 and made five league appearances, but refused to abandon his medical studies when the club asked him to become a full-time professional. He subsequently moved to Dunfermline Athletic in 1976. Dunfermline had been relegated from the First Division in 1975–76 and were unable to sustain full-time football. Whyte established himself as their first choice goalkeeper. Whyte kept the position for nine years, playing 362 games in total while keeping 116 shutouts. After retiring from his football career in 1987, Whyte became the Dunfermline club doctor.
