= Henri Martin (historian) =

French historian (1810–1883)

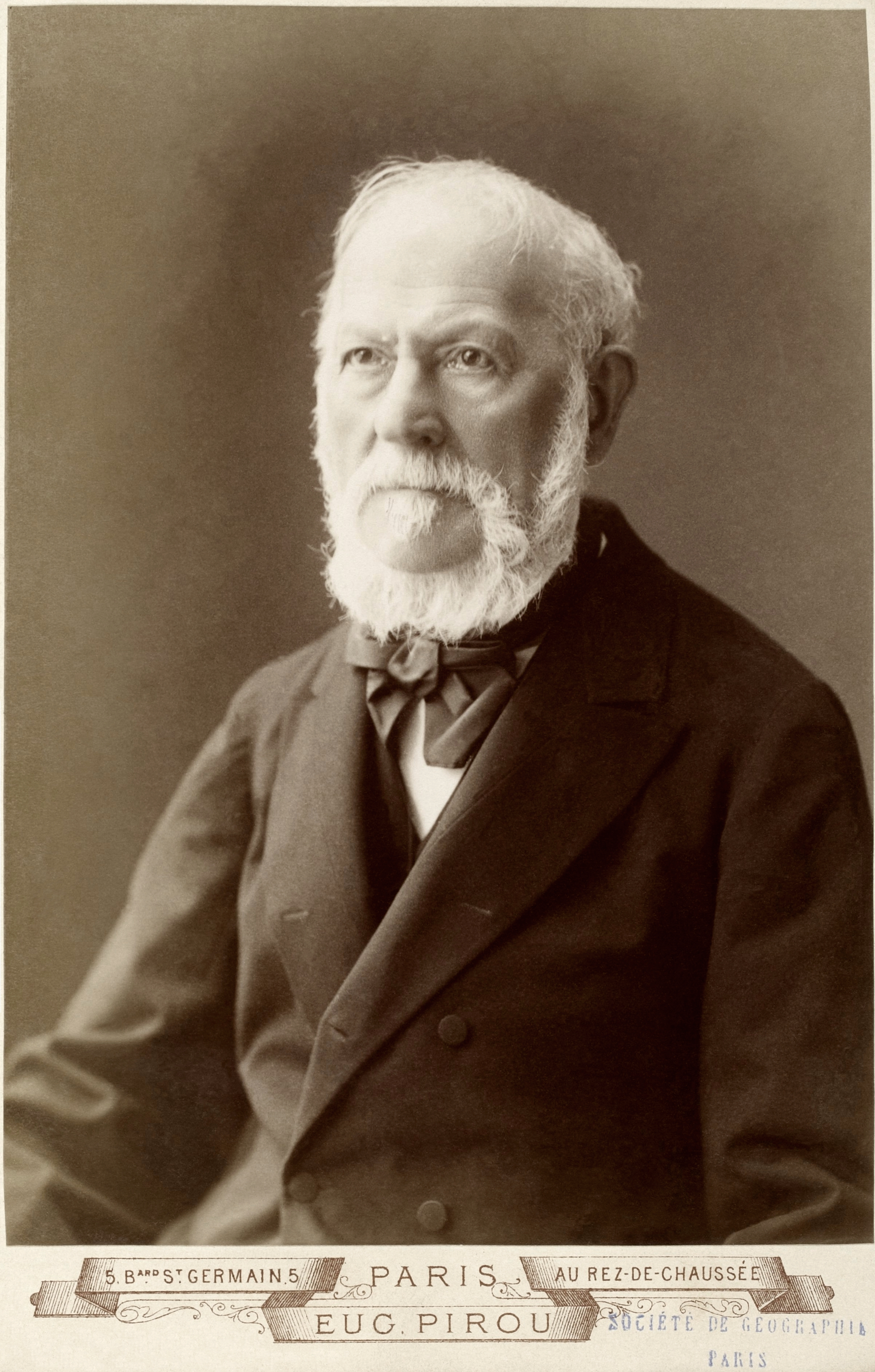
- Martin by Eugène Pirou in 1883
- Born: Bon-Louis-Henri Martin; 20 February 1810; Saint-Quentin, Aisne, France
- Died: 14 December 1883 (aged 73); Paris, France

Academic work
- Notable works: Histoire de France

Signature
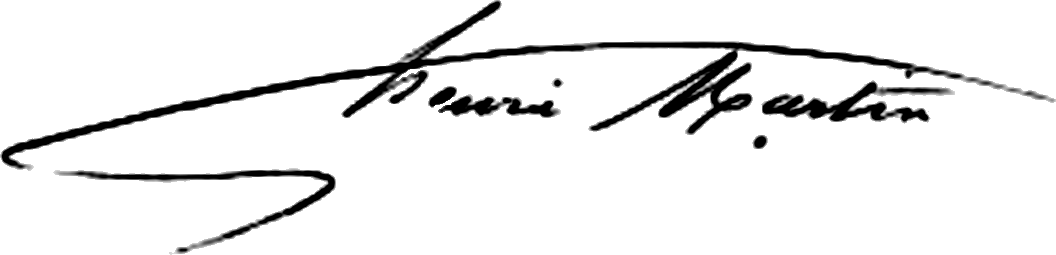

Henri Martin (French pronunciation: [ɑ̃ʁi maʁtɛ̃]; 20 February 1810 – 14 December 1883) was a French historian, who was celebrated in his own day but whose modern reputation has been eclipsed by that of his contemporary, the equally passionate Jules Michelet, whose works have often been reprinted. After publishing a few novels, Martin devoted his life to the study of the history of France, writing Histoire de France, a formidable work in 15 volumes (1833–1836). He later brought the history down to 1789 in the 4th edition (19 vols., 1865), and received from the Institut de France 20,000 francs as a prize in 1869. The Avenue Henri-Martin in Paris is named after him.

== Biography ==
Martin was born in Saint-Quentin into an upper-middle-class family. Trained as a notary, he followed this profession for some time but having achieved success with an historical romance, Wolfthurm (1830), he applied himself to historical research. Martin sat in the Assemblée Nationale as deputy for Aisne in 1871, and was elected on 13 June 1878 to seat number 38 of the Académie française, but he left no mark as a politician. Redactor at the Siècle, he was also mayor of the 16th arrondissement of Paris in 1870, deputy of Paris in 1871, senator in 1876, and one of the founders and the first president of the Ligue des Patriotes. He died in Paris on 14 December 1883 and, acclaimed as "national historian", was given a public funeral. A laudatory biography soon appeared: Gabriel Hanotaux, Henri Martin, Paris, 1885.

== Writings ==
=== Histoire de France ===
Becoming associated with Paul Lacroix (Le Bibliophile Jacob), he planned with him a history of France to consist of excerpts from the chief chroniclers and historians, with original matter filling up gaps in the continuity. In the first volume, which appeared in 1833, Histoire de France depuis les temps les plus reculés jusqu'en juillet 1830, the compiler promised to seek "always the dramatic and picturesque side of history, the one that interests the greatest number"; its success encouraged Martin to make the work his own, and his Histoire de France, in 15 volumes (1833–1836) which spans the space from earliest times to the French Revolution of 1789, was the result. This magnum opus, rewritten and further elaborated during the following 18 years of research (4th ed., 16 vols. and index, 1861–1865) gained for him in 1856 the first prize of the Academy, and in 1869 the grand biennial prize of 20,000 francs. A popular abridgement, L'Histoire de France Populaire (7 vols.) was published in 1867. This, together with the continuation, Histoire de France depuis 1789 jusqu'à nos jours (History of France from 1789 to the Present Time) (6 vols. 1878-1883), gives a complete history of France, superseding Sismondi's Histoire des Français as the primary French history of the 19th century.

This monumental work has not withstood the test of time. Martin's romanticized descriptions of Gauls as representing the Druidic key to France's essentialist "primitive tradition" are based on his longstanding close ties with the Saint-Simonian counter-Enlightenment philosopher Jean Reynaud rather than on objective history. However flawed, his popularized accounts gave a great impetus to Celtic linguistic and anthropological studies. His knowledge of the Middle Ages is inadequate, and his criticisms are not discriminating. As a free-thinking liberal republican outside the Roman Catholic Church, his prejudices often biased his judgment on the political and religious history of the ancien régime. The last six volumes, devoted to the 17th and 18th centuries, are superior to the earlier ones.

=== Other writings ===
In his essay De la France, de son génie et de ses destinées (1847) he sought to give the French a sense of their essentially national destiny within the framework of Romantic nationalism. Other minor works included Daniel Manin (1860), La Russie et l'Europe (1866), Etudes d'archéologie celtique (1872), and Les Napoléon et les frontières de la France (1874).
