= Justice White =

Justice White can refer to:

United States Supreme Court

- Byron Raymond White (1917–2002), associate justice of the United States Supreme Court
- Edward Douglass White (1845–1921), chief justice of the United States Supreme Court

United States state supreme courts

- Alexander White (Alabama politician) (1816–1893), associate justice of the Territorial Utah Supreme Court
- C. Thomas White (1928–2020), associate justice of the Nebraska Supreme Court
- Hugh Lawson White (1773–1840), associate justice of the Tennessee Supreme Court
- John D. White (judge) (1915–1999), associate justice of the Kentucky Supreme Court
- John Turner White (1854–1947), associate justice of the Supreme Court of Missouri
- John White (Alabama judge) (1778–1842), associate justice of the Alabama Supreme Court
- Paul W. White (1911–2002), associate justice of the Nebraska Supreme Court
- Penny J. White (born 1956), associate justice of the Tennessee Supreme Court
- Ronnie L. White (born 1953), associate justice and chief justice of the Supreme Court of Missouri
- S. Harrison White (1864–1945), associate justice and chief justice of the Colorado Supreme Court
- Thomas P. White (1888–1968), associate justice of the Supreme Court of California
- Weldon B. White (1907–1967), associate justice of the Tennessee Supreme Court
- William White (Ohio judge) (1822–1883), associate justice of the Supreme Court of Ohio
- William H. White (judge) (1842–1914), justice of the Washington Supreme Court

Australian courts

- Richard Weeks White (born 1954), justice of the Supreme Court of New South Wales
- Richard Conway White (born 1952), judge of the Federal Court of Australia

== See also ==
- Robert Whyte (judge) (1787–1844), associate justice of the Tennessee Supreme Court
