= Alfred White =

Alfred White may refer to:

- Alfred Holmes White (1872–1953), chemical engineer
- Alfred White (English cricketer) (1854–1941), English cricketer
- Alfred White (Australian cricketer) (1879–1962), Australian cricketer
- Alfred White (politician) (1902–1987), Australian politician
- Alfred Tredway White, American housing reformer and philanthropist
- Alfred White of White and Poppe
- Alfred White (zoologist); see James Scott Bowerbank
- Alf White (gangster) (1887–1942), English gangster
- Alfie White (1909–1970), English footballer

== See also ==
- Alf Wight, British vet and writer
- Alf Whyte, List of Worldwar characters
- Al White (disambiguation)
