= Albert White =

Albert White may refer to:

- Albert White (basketball) (born 1977), American professional basketball player
- Albert White (diver) (1895–1982), American diver and Olympic gold medalist
- Albert White (VC) (1892–1917), English soldier, recipient of the Victoria Cross during World War I
- Albert B. White (1856–1941), Governor of West Virginia
- Albert Scott White (1855–1931), lawyer and politician in New Brunswick, Canada
- Albert Smith White (1803–1864), Senator and U.S. Representative from Indiana
- Albert White (cyclist) (1890–1965), British silver medalist in cycling at the 1920 Summer Olympics
- Albert White (musician) (born 1942), American blues guitarist, singer and songwriter
- Albert White (cricketer) (1889–1965), English cricketer

== See also ==
- Al White (disambiguation)
- Bert White (disambiguation)
