= Herbert White =

Herbert White may refer to:

- Herbert White (cricketer) (1830–1863), English cricketer and clergyman
- Herbert White (footballer) (born 1907), Australian rules football player
- Herbert S. White (born 1927), American professor of library science
- Herbert Thirkell White (1855–1931), Lieutenant Governor of the British Indian province of Burma
- Herb White, basketball player
- Herbert "Whitey" White, manager of Whitey's Lindy Hoppers

== See also ==
- Bert White (disambiguation)
