= Alexander White =

Alexander White may refer to:

== Politicians ==
- Alexander White (Virginia politician), (1738–1804), U.S. Congressman from Virginia
- Alexander White (Alabama politician), (1816–1893), U.S. Congressman from Alabama
- Alexander Colwell White (1833–1906), U.S. Congressman from Pennsylvania
- Alex White (Irish politician) (born 1958), Irish Labour Party politician

== Sports ==
- Alex White (skateboarder), American skateboarder
- Sandy White (footballer) (born 1950), Scottish former footballer

== Others ==
- Alexander White (designer) (born 1988), British designer
- Alexander Whyte (1837–1921), Scottish clergyman and teacher
- Alex White (musician), musician with The Electric Soft Parade

== See also ==
- Al White (disambiguation)
- Alex White (disambiguation)
