= Frederick Greenfield =

English cricketer and Anglican priest

- The Rev. F. J. Greenfield

Personal information
- Full name: Frederick Francis John Greenfield
- Born: 10 May 1850; Gorakhpur, Bengal Presidency, British India
- Died: 25 October 1900; Dundee, Colony of Natal
- Batting: Right-handed
- Bowling: Right-arm slow roundarm

Domestic team information
- Years: Team
- 1873–1876: Cambridge University
- 1873–1883: Sussex
- 1874–1883: MCC

Career statistics
Competition	First-class
Matches	85
Runs scored	2,549
Batting average	16.76
100s/50s	2/9
Top score	126
Balls bowled	4,699
Wickets	111
Bowling average	17.99
5 wickets in innings	4
10 wickets in match	1
Best bowling	7/26
Catches/stumpings	81/–
- Source: CricketArchive, 1 June 2012

Frederick Francis John Greenfield (10 May 1850 (Note: Different sources provide different dates of birth. CricketArchive: 10 May 1850; Boase's Modern English Biography: 1 May 1850; Walker's Admissions to Peterhouse: 10 May 1848.) – 25 October 1900) was an English cricketer and Anglican priest. He captained Cambridge University in 1876 and Sussex in 1876–78 and 1881–82, and played 85 first-class matches. After serving as a chaplain in England, he migrated to South Africa, where he was taken as a prisoner during the Second Boer War and died in 1900.

== Early life and education ==
Greenfield was born in Gorakhpur, Bengal Presidency, to Rev. John Greenfield. (Note: Walker records his name as "Francis Frederic John Greenfield", and the Hurstpierpoint College register as "Frederick John".) He was educated at Hurstpierpoint, where in May 1871 he scored 216 not out against Bolney. He continued at the school as an assistant master until going to Cambridge in 1873. He was admitted to Peterhouse, Cambridge, in April 1873, later migrated to Gonville and Caius College and graduated BA in 1877. (Note: Boase gives the year of his BA as 1876.)

== Cricket career ==
Greenfield played first-class cricket for Cambridge University from 1873 to 1876, won his Blue in 1874, 1875 and 1876, and captained the team in 1876. He played for Sussex from 1873 to 1883 and made 62 first-class appearances for the county. He was twice the captain for Sussex in the periods 1876 to 1878 and 1881 to 1882. He was also a member of the Sussex committee from 1881 to 1890. The cricket writer W. A. Bettesworth thought that Greenfield had built a strong reputation as Cambridge captain, but was not a natural leader for Sussex. Overall, he appeared in 85 first-class matches from 1873 to 1884, also playing for the Marylebone Cricket Club. He was a right-handed batsman and a right-arm slow roundarm bowler who also bowled lobs. He scored 2,549 runs at an average of 16.76, with two centuries and a highest score of 126, and took 111 wickets with a best performance of seven for 26.

== Clerical career ==
Greenfield taught at Framlingham as an assistant master in 1876–77. He was ordained as a deacon of the Church of England in 1877 and priest in 1879 by the Bishop of Norwich. He served as curate of Bruisyard, Suffolk, from 1877 to 1881, of Saxtead, Suffolk, from 1881 to 1883, and of Milton-next-Gravesend, Kent, from 1883 to 1884. (Note: Walker gives his Saxtead curacy as 1881–84.) At the time of the 1881 census he was the second master at the Albert Middle Class College, Framlingham. He was then chaplain of the Poor Law Union in the district of Cuckfield, Sussex, from 1884 to 1891, and also of the Sussex County Lunatic Asylum from 1885 to 1890. (Note: Sources differ on the dates: Boase gives 1884–90 for both chaplaincies, Ambrose 1884–90 for the asylum, and Walker 1885–91 for the asylum.)

== South Africa and death ==
Greenfield then moved to South Africa and served in the Cape Mounted Police, (Note: Ambrose gives the unit as the Cape Mounted Rifles.) and was headmaster of a school near Dundee, Natal, from 1896 until 1900. During the Second Boer War, he was taken prisoner by the Boers, who ill-treated him and robbed him of all his possessions. He travelled to England to seek redress, then returned to South Africa, where he died of pleurisy at Dundee on 25 October 1900. (Note: Bettesworth said the death was due to injuries received at the hands of the Boers.)
