= Alan White =

Alan White may refer to:

== Music ==
- Alan White (Oasis drummer) (born 1972), English drummer in rock group Oasis
- Alan White (Yes drummer) (1949–2022), English drummer in rock group Yes
- Chip White (Alan White, 1946–2020), American jazz drummer

== Sports ==
- Alan White (Australian footballer) (1933–2018), Australian rules footballer
- Alan White (English footballer) (born 1976), English footballer

== Other ==
- Alan White (American philosopher) (born 1951), American philosopher
- Alan White (actor) (1924–2013), Australian actor
- Alan White (economist), University of Toronto finance professor
- Alan White (novelist) (1924–2003), English novelist, author of The Long Day's Dying
- Alan White (RAF officer) (1932–2015), British air marshal
- Alan David White (1923–2020), American physicist
- Alan R. White (1922–1992), Irish philosopher
- Alan White, British Committee of 100 (United Kingdom) signatory

== See also ==
- Allan White (1915–1993), English cricketer
- Allan White (footballer) (1915–1987), Australian rules footballer
- Allen-White School, an historic school in Whiteville, Tennessee
- Al White (disambiguation)
