= Bert White =

Bert White may refer to:

- Bert White (Australian footballer) (1906–1988), Australian rules footballer with Fitzroy
- Berta Lee White (1914–2004), Mississippi politician
- Henry White (footballer, born 1895) (1895–1972), English association football player

== See also ==
- Albert White (disambiguation)
- Robert White (disambiguation)
- Herbert White (disambiguation)
- Hubert White (disambiguation)
