= All White =

All White(s) may refer to:

- All Whites, the New Zealand national football (Soccer) team
- "All White", a song by …And You Will Know Us by the Trail of Dead from Worlds Apart

== See also ==
- All-white jury
- Al White (disambiguation)
- Color line (civil rights issue)
- White (disambiguation)
