= Alex White =

Alex White may refer to:

== Sports ==
- Alex White (badminton), (born 1961), Scottish badminton player
- Alex White (baseball) (born 1988), American professional baseball player
- Alex White (footballer) (1916–1995), Scottish footballer
- Alex White (fighter) (born 1988), American professional mixed martial artist
- Alex White (rower) (born 1983), South African Olympic rower
- Alex White (skateboarder), American skateboarder

== Musicians ==
- Alex White (musician), multi-instrumentalist with Electric Soft Parade
- Miss Alex White (born 1985), musician

== Others ==
- Alex White (author) (born 1981), American writer of science fiction
- Alex White (Irish politician) (born 1958), politician and barrister in Ireland
- Alex Hyde-White (born 1959), English-born, US-raised film and television actor
- Alex White (Canadian politician) (born 1984), leader of the New Brunswick New Democratic Party

== See also ==
- Al White (disambiguation)
- Alexander White (disambiguation)
