= Statue of Charles II, Royal Hospital Chelsea =

Statue in London by Grinling Gibbons

Coordinates: 51.4871°N 0.1577°W

Statue of Charles II
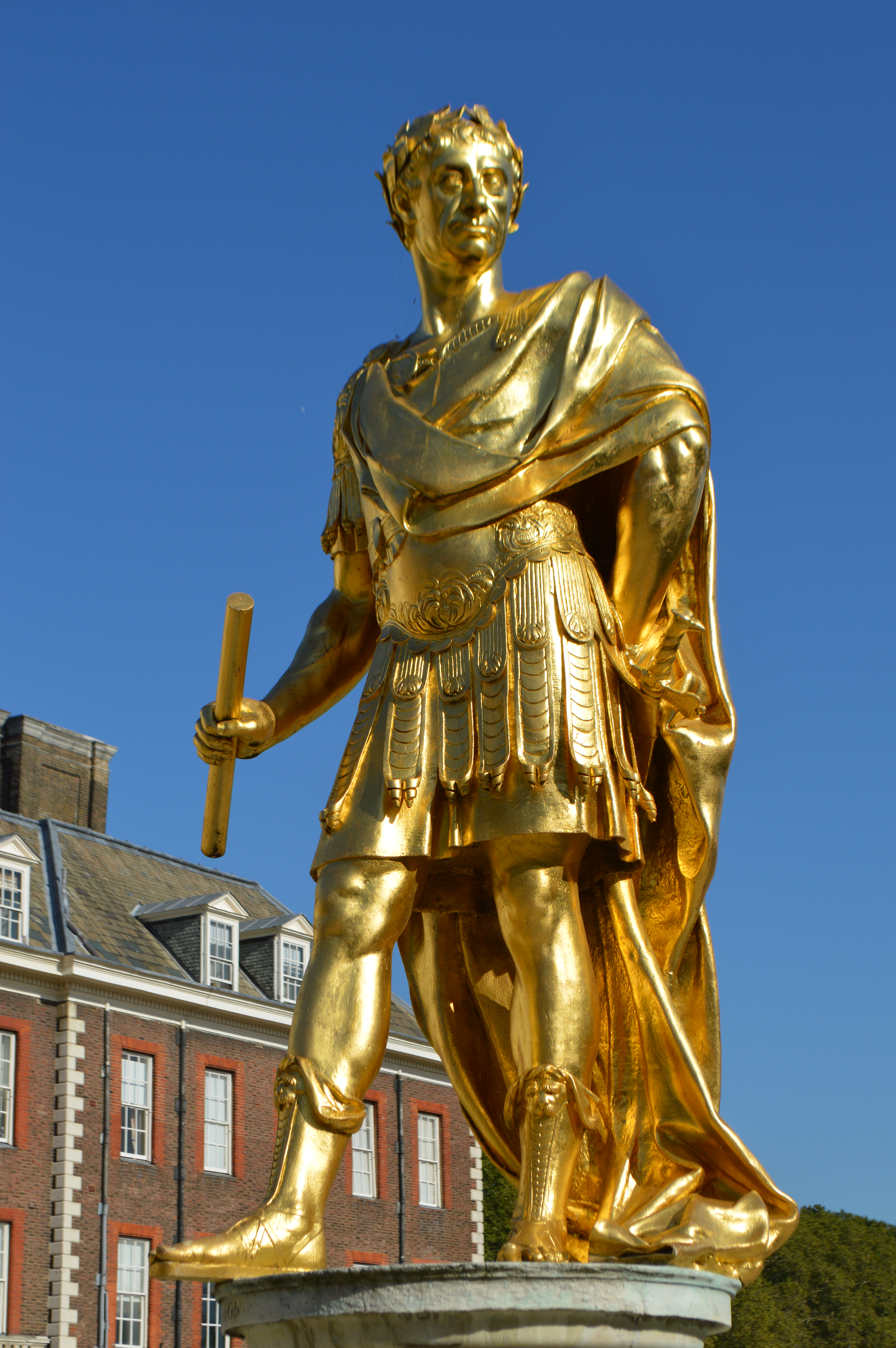
- Artist: Grinling Gibbons
- Completion date: c. 1680
- Type: Statue
- Medium: Brass
- Subject: Charles II of England
- Dimensions: 1.55 m × 1.18 m (5.1 ft × 3.9 ft)
- Location: Royal Hospital; Chelsea; London SW3; England; United Kingdom

Listed Building – Grade I
- Official name: Statue of Charles II in centre of middle courtyard in main buildings, Royal Hospital
- Designated: 5 April 1969
- Reference no.: 1226477

The statue of Charles II stands in the Figure, or Middle, Court of the Royal Hospital, Chelsea, London. The sculptor was Grinling Gibbons, and the statue was executed around 1680–1682. The king founded the Royal Hospital in 1682 as a home for retired army veterans. The statue is a Grade I listed structure.

== History ==
Charles II founded the Royal Hospital in 1682 to care for "those broken by age or war". The inspiration was the Hôtel des Invalides in Paris, founded by Louis XIV of France. The commission was given to Christopher Wren and construction continued from 1682 to 1691. The statue of Charles was commissioned by Tobias Rustat, a member of the king's court and was designed by Grinling Gibbons in about 1682. Gibbons's fee was £500. The statue originally stood elsewhere and was moved to the Royal Hospital after Charles's death in 1685. Annually, on 29 May, Oak Apple Day, the traditional day for the celebration of the Restoration in 1660, the statue is wreathed with oak leaves.

== Description ==
The statue is of brass and was originally gilded in bronze. It has been re-gilded subsequently to commemorate the Golden Jubilee of Queen Elizabeth II in 2002. It depicts the king in the attire of a Roman general, is 7.6 ft high, and stands on a marble plinth. The statue was designated a Grade I listed structure, the highest grading given to buildings and structures of "exceptional interest", in 1969.

== Bibliography ==
- Blackwood, John (1989). London's Immortals: The Complete Outdoor Commemorative Statues. London: Savoy Press. ISBN 0-9514296-0-4. OCLC 21328602.
- Cherry, Bridget; Pevsner, Nikolaus (2002). London 3: North West. The Buildings of England. New Haven, US, London, UK: Yale University Press. ISBN 9780300096521. OCLC 49298248.
- Darke, Jo (1991). The Monument Guide to England and Wales: A National Portrait in Bronze and Stone. London: MacDonald and Co. OCLC 1008240876.
