= Equestrian statue of Charles II, Windsor Castle =

Sculpture by Grinling Gibbons

Coordinates: 51.4839°N 0.6038°W

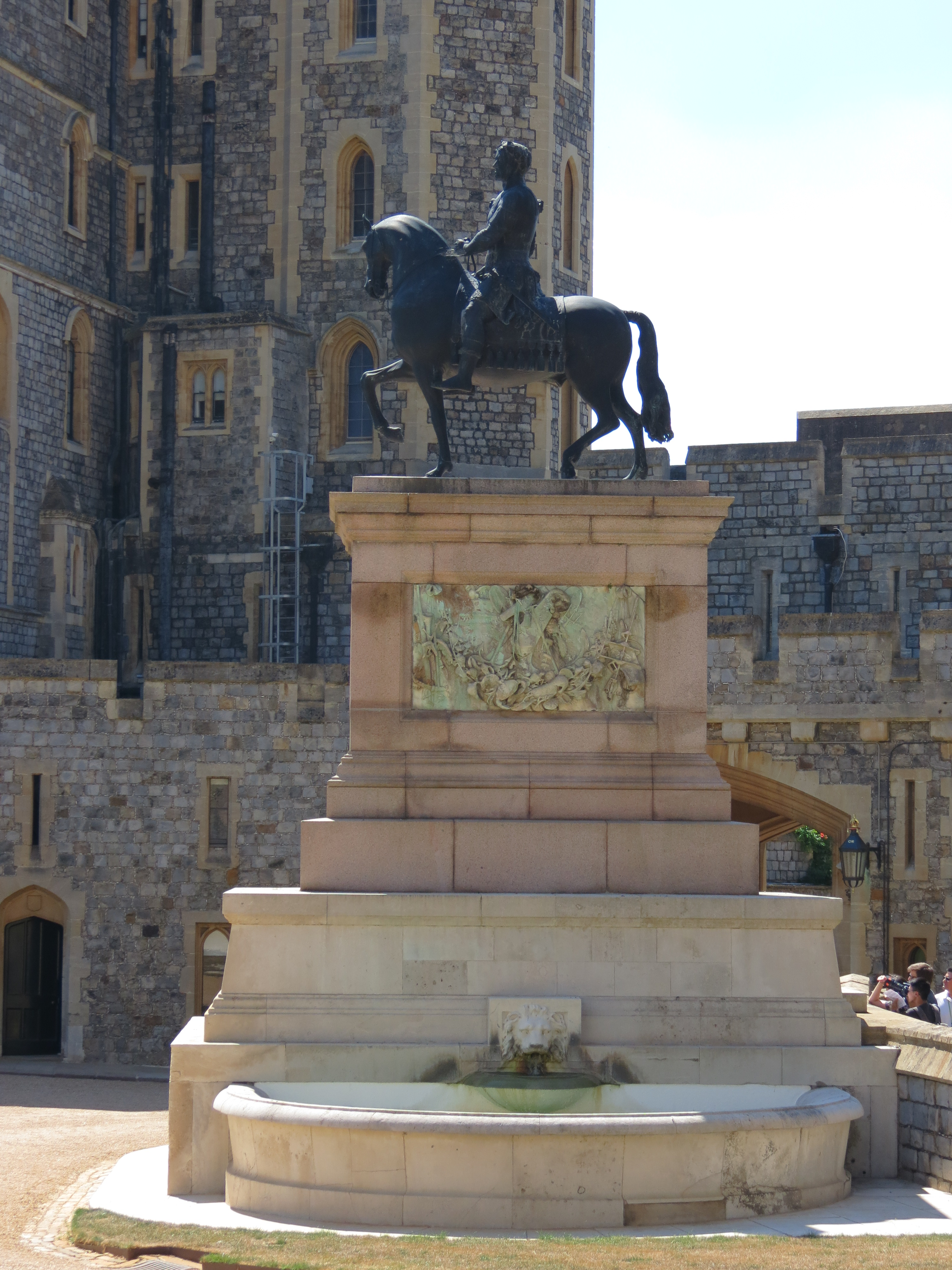

A bronze equestrian statue of Charles II on horseback sits in the Upper Ward of Windsor Castle beneath the castle's Round Tower. It was inspired by Hubert Le Sueur's statue of Charles I in London, the statue was cast by Josias Ibach in 1679, with the marble plinth featuring carvings by Grinling Gibbons. The statue was commissioned by Tobias Rustat, Charles's valet. Rustat was a significant philanthropist of the 1670s. Rustat's fortune was partially derived from the transatlantic slave trade, having been an investor in the Royal African Company.

The rear left hoof of the horse is inscribed 'Josias Ibach Stada Bramesis 1679 FUDIT'. Gibbons had been appointed the 'Surveyor and Repairer of Carved Work at Windsor' in 1682. The Royal Collection Trust listing for the statue describes the design as "very innovative" in its depiction of Charles as a Roman emperor with its absence of traditional symbols of the British monarchy such as the Order of the Garter. Charles is depicted wearing a suit of armour in a classically Roman style, without spurs and stirrups for his horse. He is crowned with a laurel wreath. The statue started a subsequent trend for British monarchs to be portrayed in a Roman style.

The statue may have been inspired by the Equestrian Statue of Marcus Aurelius that was originally situated on the Capitoline Hill in Rome with its similar placing of the horse and design of the plinth.
