= Alfred White (English cricketer) =

English cricketer

Personal information
- Full name: Alfred Charles White
- Born: 28 February 1854; Teddington, Middlesex, England
- Died: 24 July 1941 (aged 87); Esher, Surrey, England
- Batting: Right-handed

Domestic team information
- Years: Team
- 1881: Surrey

Career statistics
Competition	First-class
Matches	1
Runs scored	15
Batting average	15.00
100s/50s	–/–
Top score	9*
Balls bowled	–
Wickets	–
Bowling average	–
5 wickets in innings	–
10 wickets in match	–
Best bowling	–
Catches/stumpings	–/–
- Source: Cricinfo, 24 June 2012

Alfred Charles White (28 February 1854 – 24 July 1941) was an English cricketer. White was a right-handed batsman. He was born at Teddington, Middlesex.

White made a single first-class appearance for Surrey against Sussex in 1881 at The Oval. Sussex won the toss and elected to bat, making 95 all out. Surrey responded in their first-innings by making 193 all out, with White ending the innings not out on 9. Sussex then made 136 all out in their second-innings, leaving Surrey with a target of 39 for victory. White opened the batting in Surrey's chase, scoring 6 runs before he was dismissed by Walter Bettesworth. Surrey reached their target with 8 wickets to spare. This was his only major appearance for Surrey.
