= Hubert White =

Hubert White may refer to:

- Hubie White (born 1940), basketball player
- Hubert White (store), menswear store in Minneapolis's IDS Center

== See also ==
- Bert White (disambiguation)
- Hubert Wyndeatt-Whyte
