= Herbert White (cricketer) =

English cricketer and clergyman

Personal information
- Full name: Herbert Southey White
- Born: August 1830; Tivetshall, Norfolk, England
- Died: 17 May 1863 (aged 32); Tunstead, Norfolk, England
- Batting: Unknown

Domestic team information
- Years: Team
- 1851–1852: Cambridge University

Career statistics
| Competition | First-class |
|---|---|
| Matches | 6 |
| Runs scored | 98 |
| Batting average | 9.80 |
| 100s/50s | –/– |
| Top score | 28* |
| Catches/stumpings | 1/– |
- Source: Cricinfo, 25 January 2023

Herbert Southey White (August 1830 – 17 May 1863) was an English clergyman and a cricketer who played in six first-class cricket matches for Cambridge University in 1851 and 1852. He was born at Tivetshall, Norfolk and died at Tunstead, also in Norfolk.

White was educated at Bury St Edmunds Grammar School and at Jesus College, Cambridge, where he was a Rustat Scholar, taking advantage of a fund for the sons of deceased clergy. He played cricket as a middle- or lower-order batsman, though it is not known whether he was right- or left-handed. He top-scored with an unbeaten 28 for Cambridge in the match against Marylebone Cricket Club (MCC) preceding the 1851 University Match against Oxford University, but failed to be picked for his Blue. The following season, despite being unsuccessful in other matches, he was picked for the University Match, where he made scores of 5 and 7 in a heavy defeat for his side, which played one man short (10 players against Oxford's 11).

White graduated from Cambridge University with a Bachelor of Arts degree in 1853; this converted to a Master of Arts in 1857. He was ordained as a deacon in the Church of England in 1855 and as a priest two years later. He served as curate at Watton, Norfolk and as priest-in-charge of St Matthew's Church, Thorpe, Norwich before settling as vicar of Tunstead and Sco-Ruston in 1858. On 5 May 1863, his wife, Edith Frances, whom he had married in 1858, died at Tunstead vicarage from diphtheria; White died there 12 days later from the same disease.
