= Grinling Gibbons =

Anglo-Dutch sculptor and wood carver

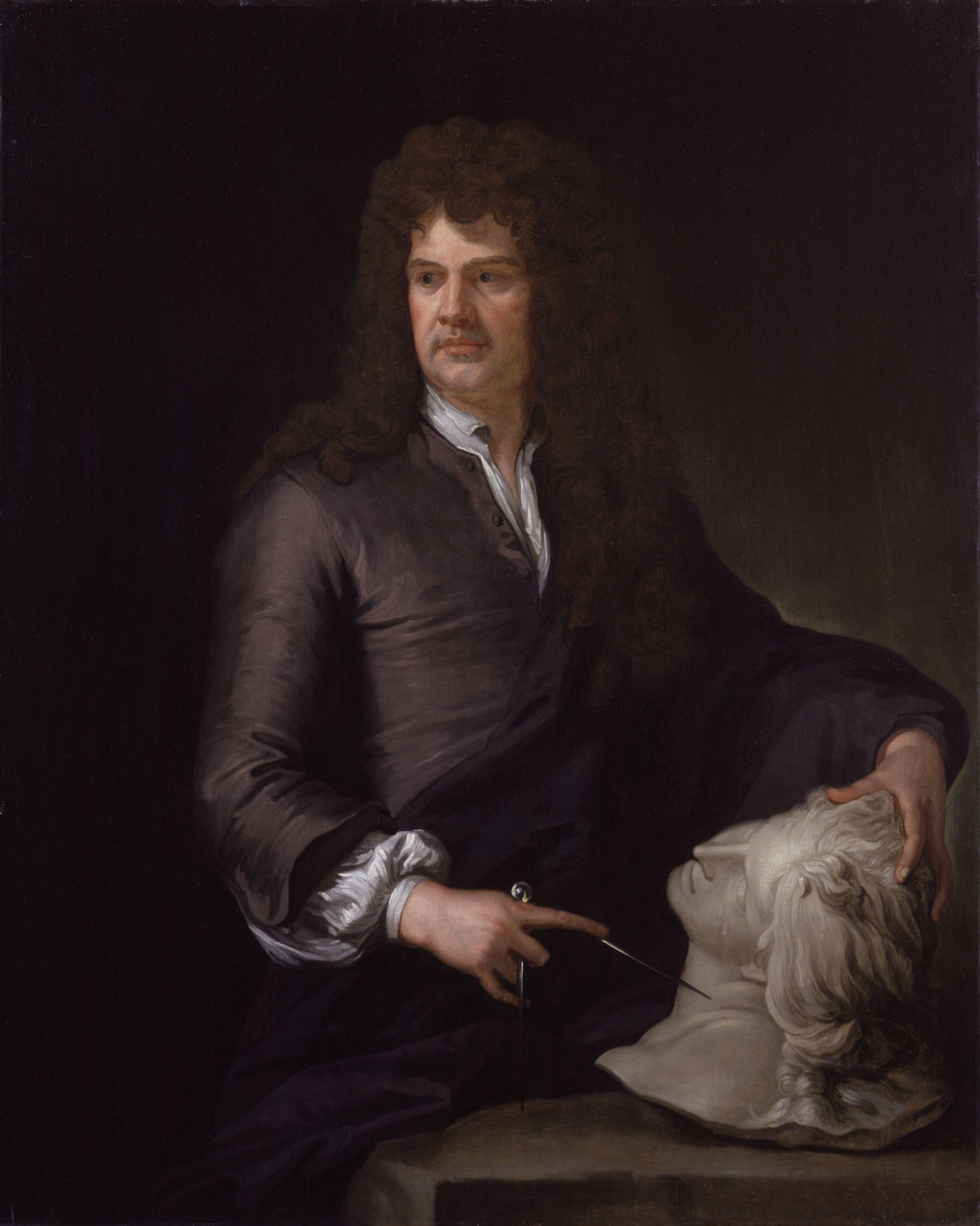
- Grinling Gibbons by Godfrey Kneller, c. 1690
- Born: 4 April 1648; Rotterdam, Dutch Republic
- Died: 3 August 1721 (aged 73)
- Resting place: St Paul's, Covent Garden, London
- Occupations: Sculptor and wood carver
- Known for: Works on St Paul's Cathedral

Grinling Gibbons (4 April 1648 – 3 August 1721) was an Anglo-Dutch sculptor and wood carver known for his work in England, including Windsor Castle, the Royal Hospital Chelsea and Hampton Court Palace, St Paul's Cathedral and other London churches, Petworth House and other country houses, Trinity College, Oxford and Trinity College, Cambridge. Gibbons was born to English parents in Holland, where he was educated.

His father was a merchant. Gibbons was a member of the Drapers' Company of London; he is widely regarded as the finest wood carver working in England, and the only one whose name is widely known among the general public. Most of his work is in lime (Tilia) wood, especially decorative Baroque garlands made up of still-life elements at about life size, made to frame mirrors and decorate the walls of churches and palaces, but he also produced furniture and small relief plaques with figurative scenes. He also worked in stone, mostly for churches. By the time he was established he led a large workshop, and the extent to which his personal hand appears in later work varies.

== Life ==
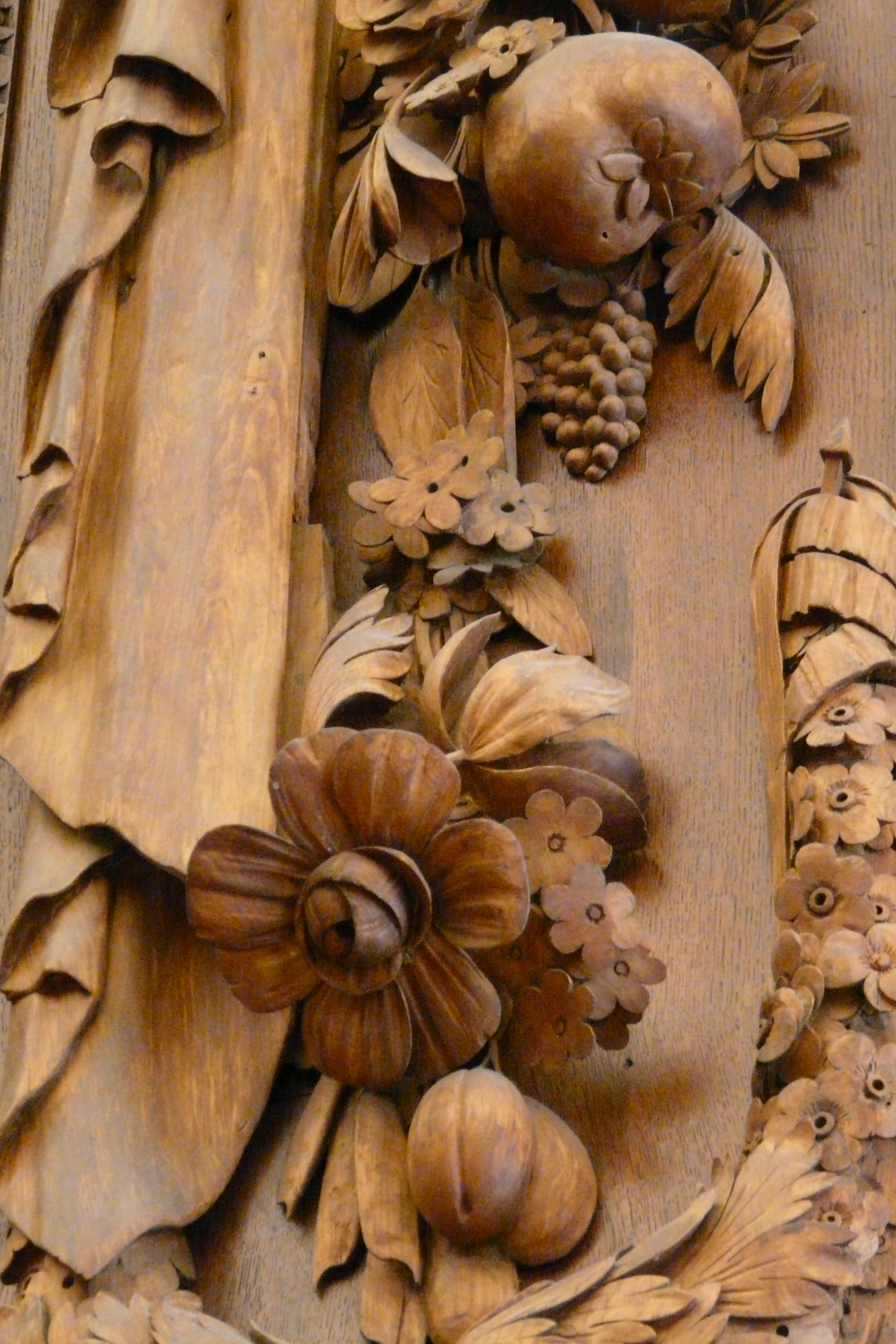
Detail from Hampton Court Palace

Very little is known about his early life. The name Grinling is formed from sections of two family names.

He was born in Rotterdam, Netherlands, and it is sometimes thought that his father may have been the Englishman Samuel Gibbons, who worked under Inigo Jones, but even two of his closest acquaintances, the portrait painter Thomas Murray and the diarist John Evelyn, cannot agree on how he came to be introduced to King Charles II. He moved to Deptford, England, around 1667, and by 1693 had accepted commissions from the royal family and had been appointed as a master carver. By 1680 he was already known as the "King's Carver", and carried out exquisite work for St Paul's Cathedral, Windsor Castle, and the Earl of Essex's house at Cassiobury. His carving was so fine that it was said a pot of carved flowers above his house in London would tremble from the motion of passing coaches.

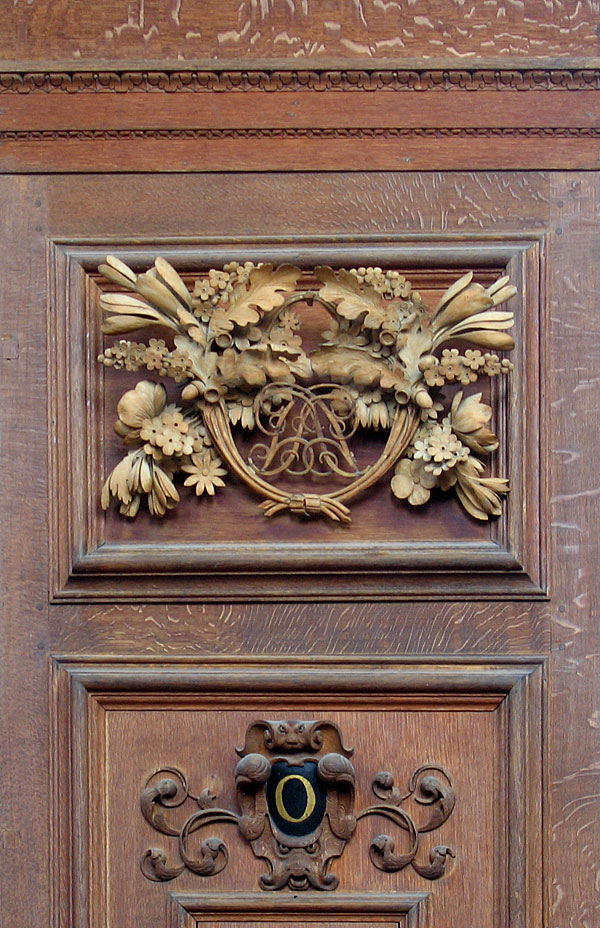
Bookcase carvings for the Wren Library at Trinity College, Cambridge

The diarist Evelyn first discovered Gibbons' talent by chance in 1671. Evelyn, from whom Gibbons rented a cottage near Evelyn's home in Sayes Court, Deptford (today part of south-east London), wrote the following: "I saw the young man at his carving, by the light of a candle. I saw him to be engaged on a carved representation of Tintoretto's Crucifixion, which he had in a frame of his own making." Later that same evening, Evelyn described what he had seen to Sir Christopher Wren. The ‘Crucifixion’ and frame now hang in the library in Dunham Massey Hall in Cheshire. Wren and Evelyn then introduced him to King Charles II who gave him his first commission – still resting in the dining room of Windsor Castle.

Gibbons was a member of the Drapers' Company in London, being admitted by patrimony in 1672 and called to the livery in 1685. He was elected to the court and as a warden and then stood for election to be Master in 1718, 1719, and 1720, losing to an alderman each time.

Horace Walpole later wrote about Gibbons: "There is no instance of a man before Gibbons who gave wood the loose and airy lightness of flowers, and chained together the various productions of the elements with the free disorder natural to each species."

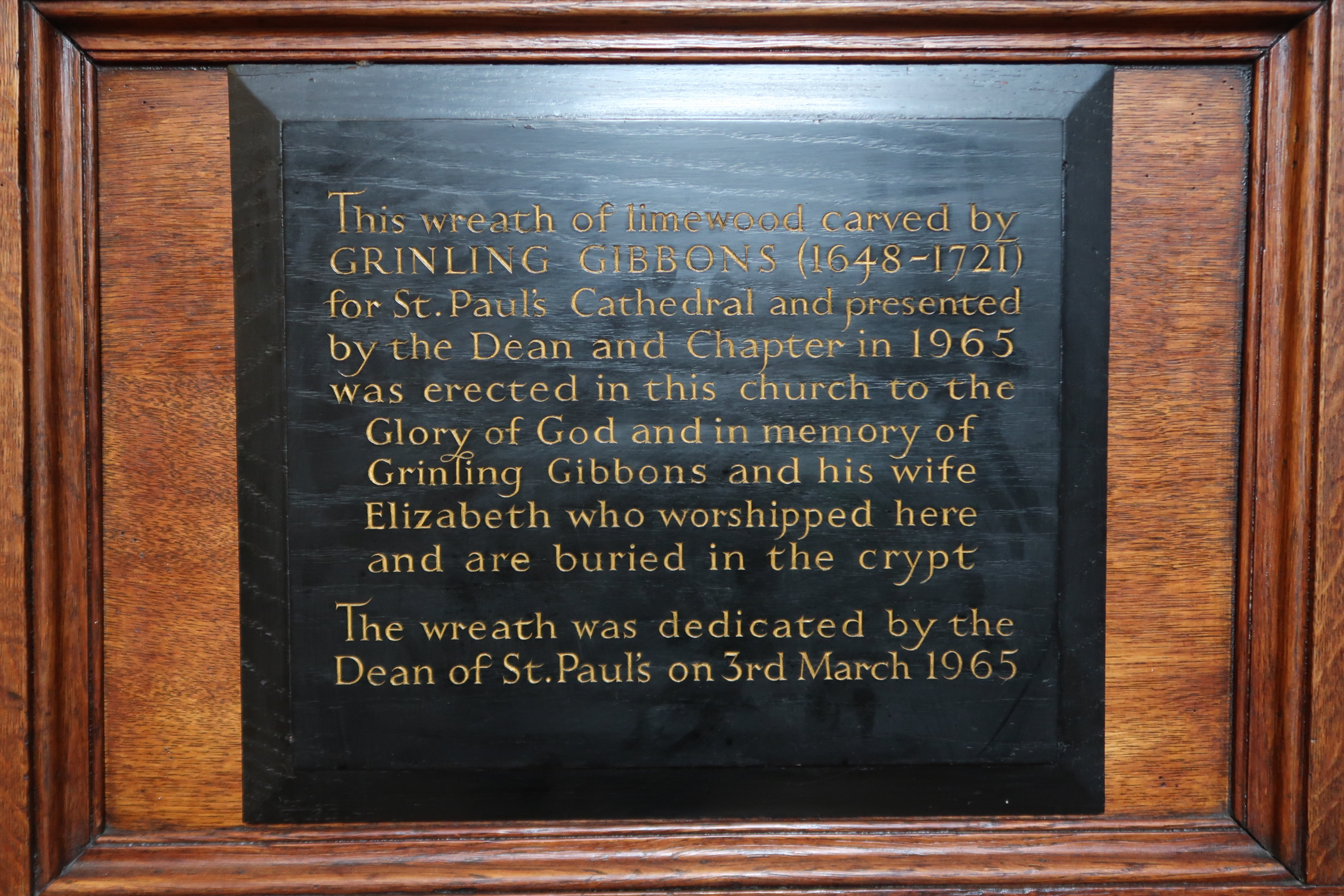
Plaque below a wreath of limewood in St Paul's Church, Covent Garden

Gibbons is buried at St Paul's, Covent Garden, London, along with his wife Elizabeth. They are both buried in the crypt as attested by a plaque in the church below a wreath of limewood, carved by Gibbons and donated by the Dean and Chapter of St Paul's Cathedral in 1965.

== Work ==
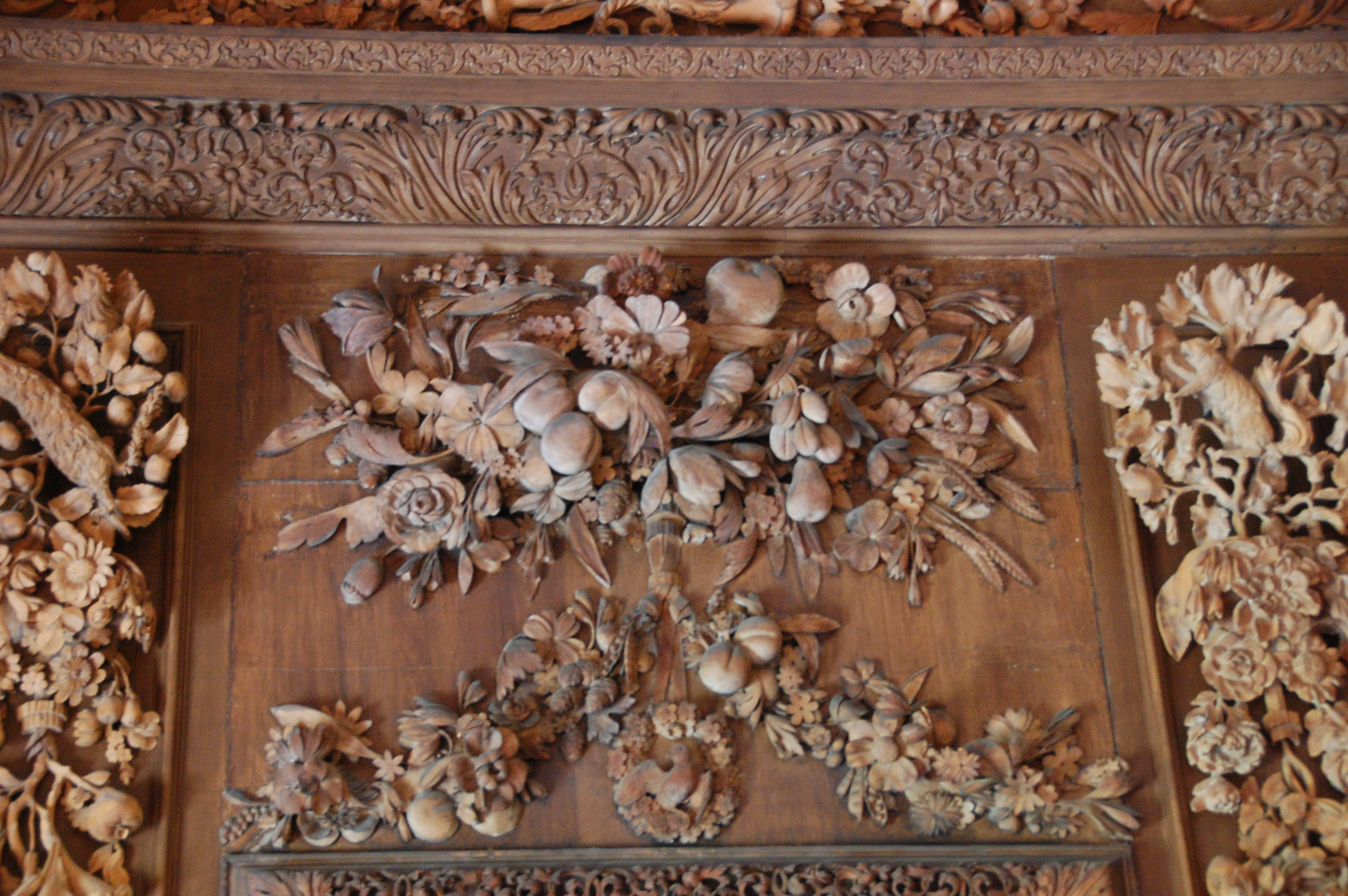
Detail from Carved Room, Petworth House

Gibbons was employed by Wren to work on St Paul's Cathedral and later was appointed as master carver to George I. He was also commissioned by William III to create carvings, some of which adorn Kensington Palace. An example of his work can be seen in the Presence Chamber above the fireplace, which was originally intended to frame a portrait of Queen Mary II after her death in 1694. Also in the Orangery at Kensington, you can see some his pieces. Many fine examples of his work can still be seen in the churches around London, particularly the choir stalls and organ case of St Paul's Cathedral. Some of the finest Gibbons carvings accessible to the general public are those on display at the National Trust's Petworth House in West Sussex. At Petworth the Carved Room is host to a fine and extensive display of intricate wooden carvings by Gibbons.

His work can be seen in the London churches of St Michael Paternoster Royal and St James, Piccadilly, where he carved the wood reredos and marble font. The Anglican dislike of painted altarpieces typically left a large space on the east wall that needed filling, which often gave Grinling's garlands a very prominent position, as here.

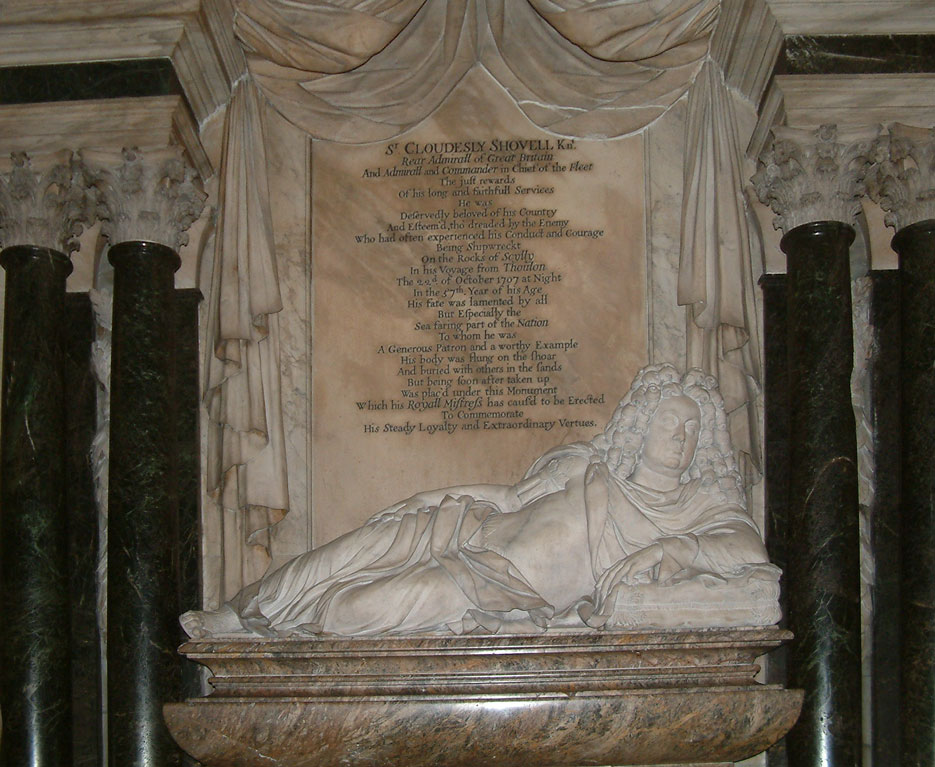
Monument for Cloudesley Shovell in Westminster Abbey

In 1682 King Charles II commissioned Gibbons to carve a panel as a diplomatic gift for his political ally Cosimo III de' Medici, Grand Duke of Tuscany. The Cosimo Panel is an allegory of art triumphing over hatred and turmoil and includes a medallion with a low relief of Pietro da Cortona, Cosimo's favourite painter. The panel is housed in the Palazzo Pitti in Florence. It was displayed in the United Kingdom in the Grinling Gibbons and the Art of Carving exhibition held at the Victoria and Albert Museum from 22 October 1998 until 24 January 1999.

Tobias Rustat commissioned three statues of Stuart kings from the workshop of Grinling Gibbons in the 1670s and '80s. These were the standing statue of Charles II at the Royal Hospital Chelsea, an equestrian statue of Charles II in Windsor Castle and the statue of James II, now in Trafalgar Square. The last was commissioned for the Palace of Whitehall, apparently at the same time as the standing Charles II, and the two works might have been intended as pendant pieces.

In 1685, the new king James II asked Gibbons to carve a panel for another Italian ally, Francesco II d'Este, Duke of Modena, brother to his second wife Mary of Modena. The Modena Panel is a memento mori for Charles II who died earlier that year and includes a funeral dirge from the play The Contention of Ajax and Ulysses by dramatist James Shirley: "There is no armour against fate; Death lays its icy hand on kings: Sceptre and crown must tumble down". It also features a medallion self-portrait of Gibbons. The panel is displayed in the Galleria Estense in Modena.

The Church of St Peter and St Paul, Exton, Rutland, has a fine marble tomb by Gibbons, dating from 1685, showing Baptist Noel, 3rd Viscount Campden with his fourth wife, Elizabeth Bertie, and carvings of his 19 children.

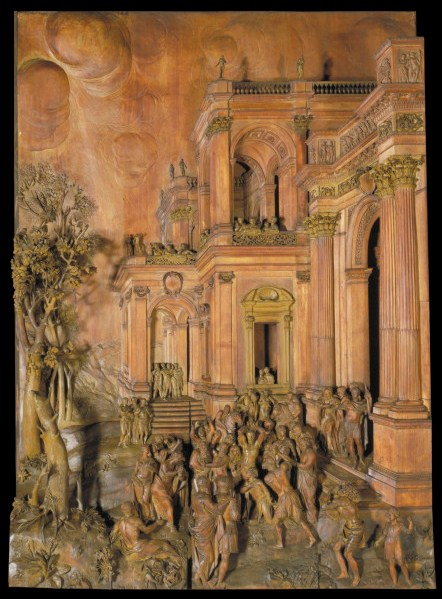
Stoning of St Stephen, c. 1680, in the Victoria and Albert Museum

Many experienced Flemish sculptors such as Artus Quellinus III, John Nost, Anthony Verhuke, Laurens van der Meulen and Peter van Dievoet also worked in Gibbon's London workshop as "servants", i.e. collaborators. As these Flemish artists were not trainees they were never entered in the Draper's records. In a document dated 1679 van der Meulen, Quellin and Verhuke are referred to as servants of Gibbons. Many of them left London and returned to their home country after the Glorious Revolution of 1688.

In the Gibbons workshop these Flemish artists worked on various commissions but the contributions of particular artists active in the workshop are not always identifiable. Laurens van der Meulen and Peter van Dievoet are known to have collaborated on the creation of the statue of King James II during their stay in the workshop of Gibbons.

St Michael and All Angels Church, Badminton, has a monument by Gibbons to Henry Somerset, 1st Duke of Beaufort (1629–1700). He was buried alongside his ancestors in the Beaufort Chapel in St George's Chapel, Windsor, but the monument was moved to Badminton in 1878. The monument by Gibbons is now on the north side of the chancel at St Michael and All Angels Church, Badminton, and consists of an effigy of the Duke in Garter robes, reclining on a sarcophagus and a plinth with relief of St George and the Dragon. There are twin Corinthian columns with embossed shafts, acanthus frieze, cornice with flaming urns, and the Duke's arms and supporters. At the top, 25 ft from the ground, is a tasseled cushion supporting a coronet; on the plinth are full-length female figures of Justice and Truth. Above the Duke's effigy, parted curtains show the heavenly host with palms and crowns. The Latin inscription displays the names of his family and the many offices he held.

Gibbons made the monument for Admiral Sir Cloudesley Shovell, who was killed in the Scilly naval disaster of 1707. Shovell's large marble monument can be seen in the south choir aisle of Westminster Abbey.

Gibbons often carved pea pods in his work. There is a myth that Gibbons carved a closed pea pod at first, and then an open one when the work had been paid for.

== Method of working ==
Gibbons is believed to have invented the method of building up carvings through separate layers, each layer being nailed to the one beneath. The images below show a modern duplication of the technique.

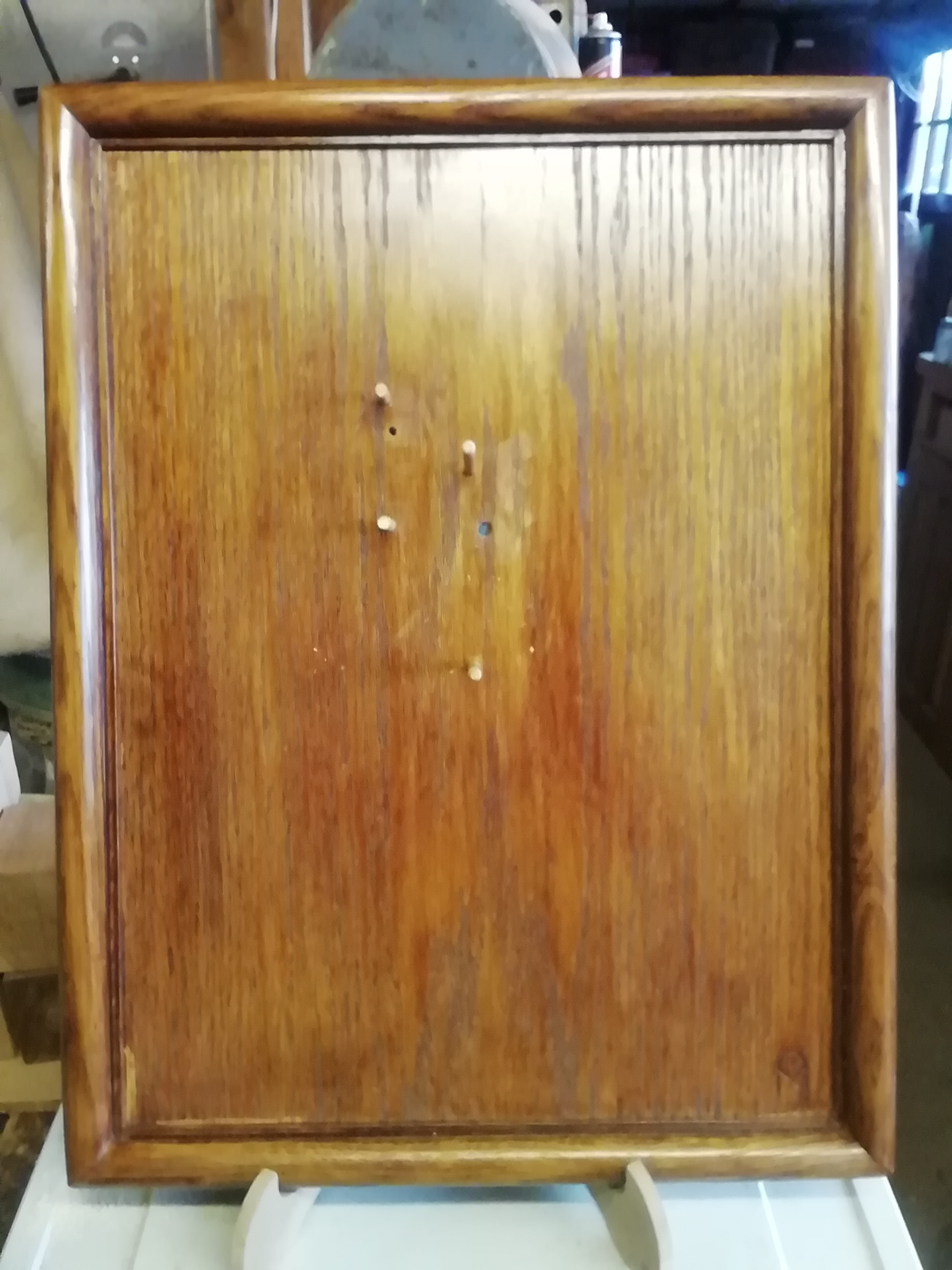
Base fitted with dowels

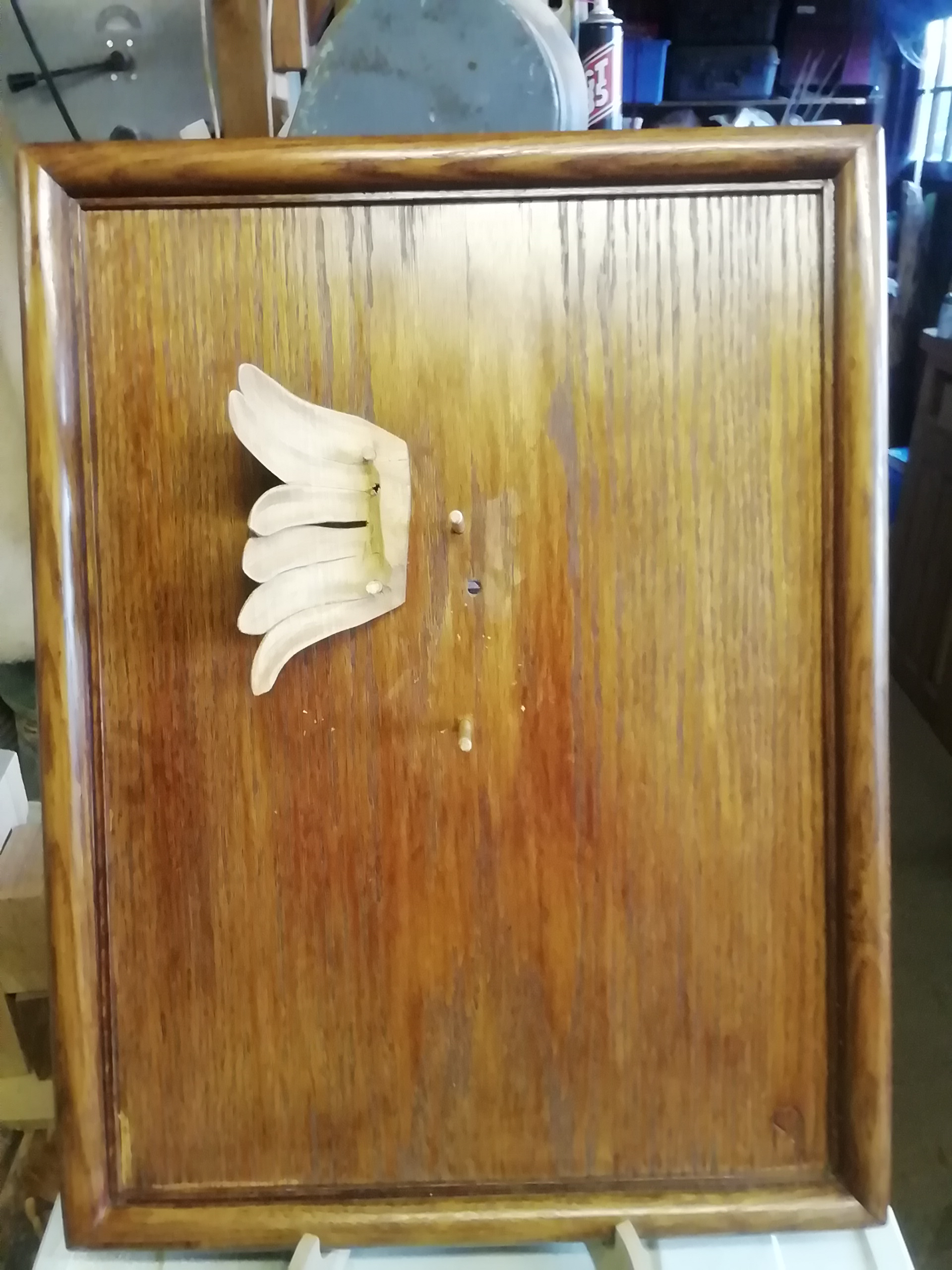
Layer 1

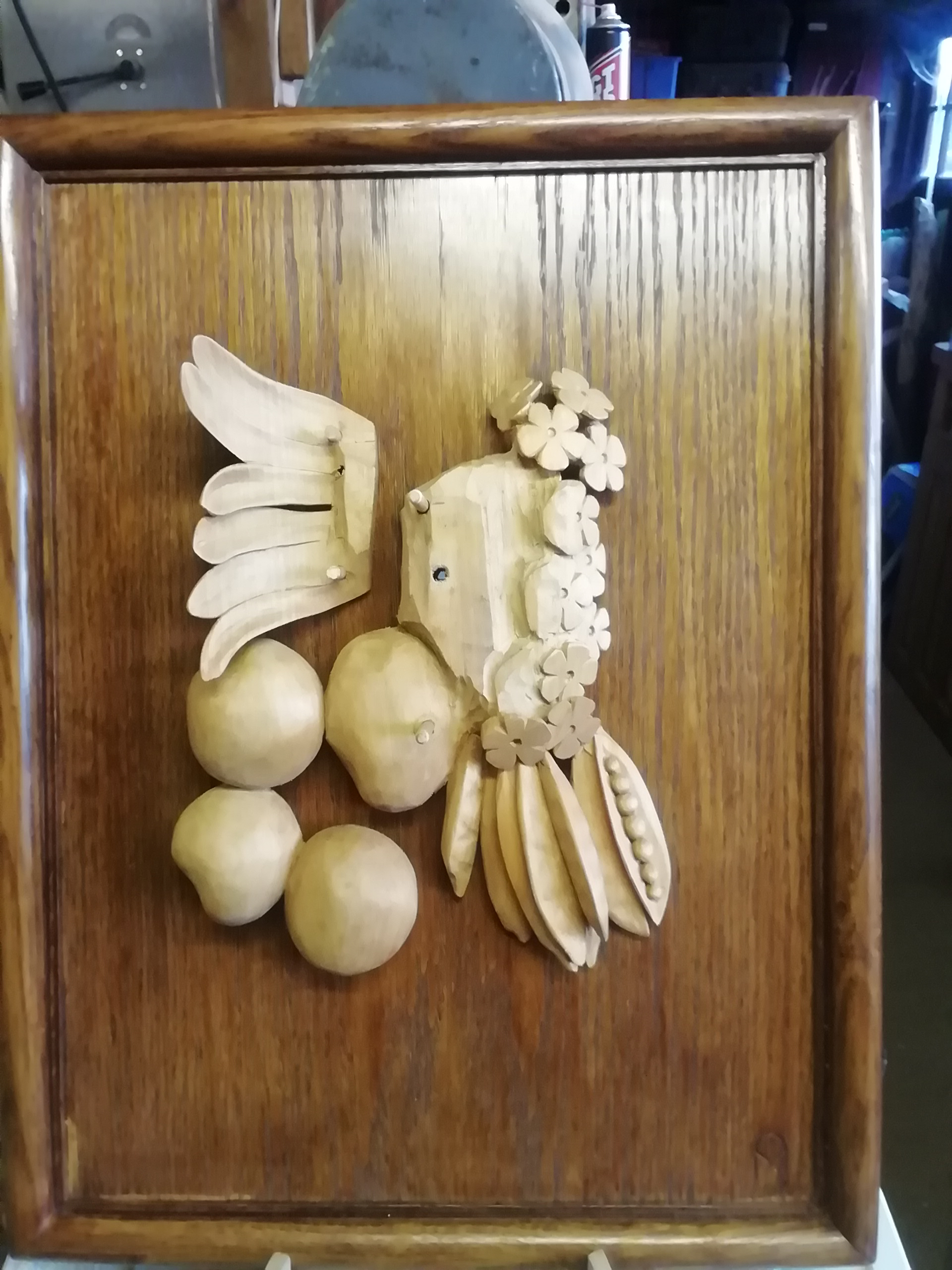
Layer 2

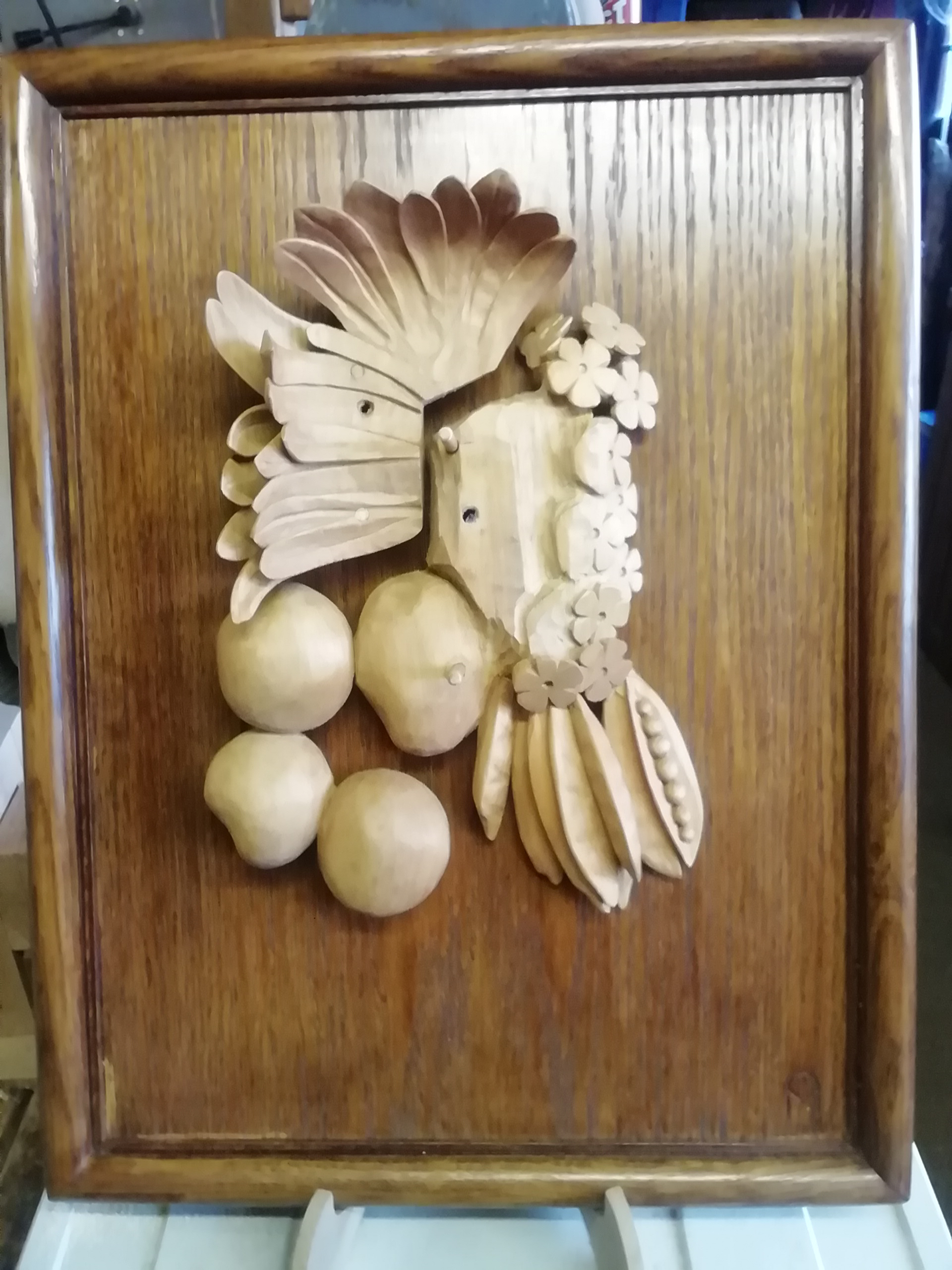
Layer 3

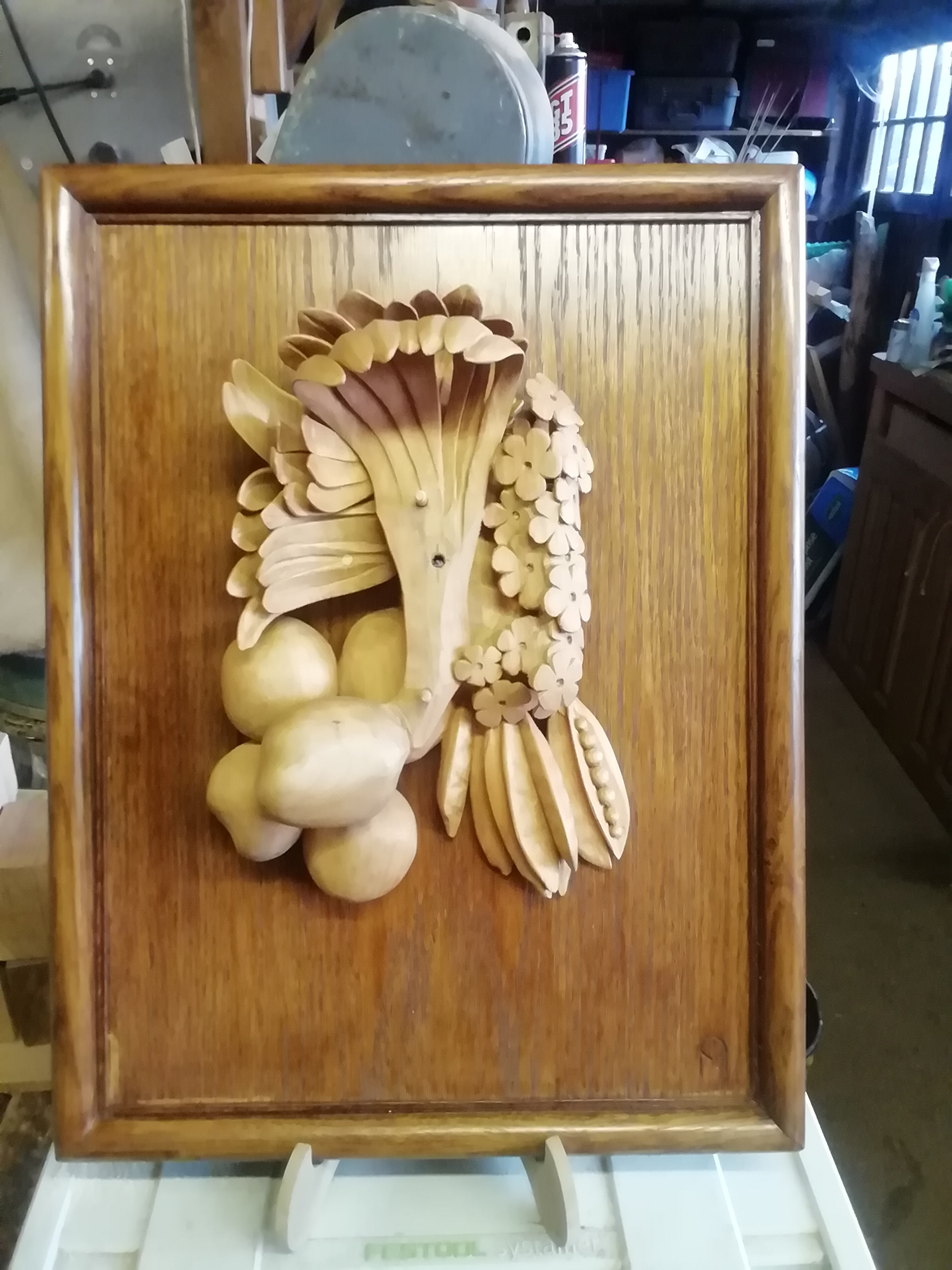
Layer 4

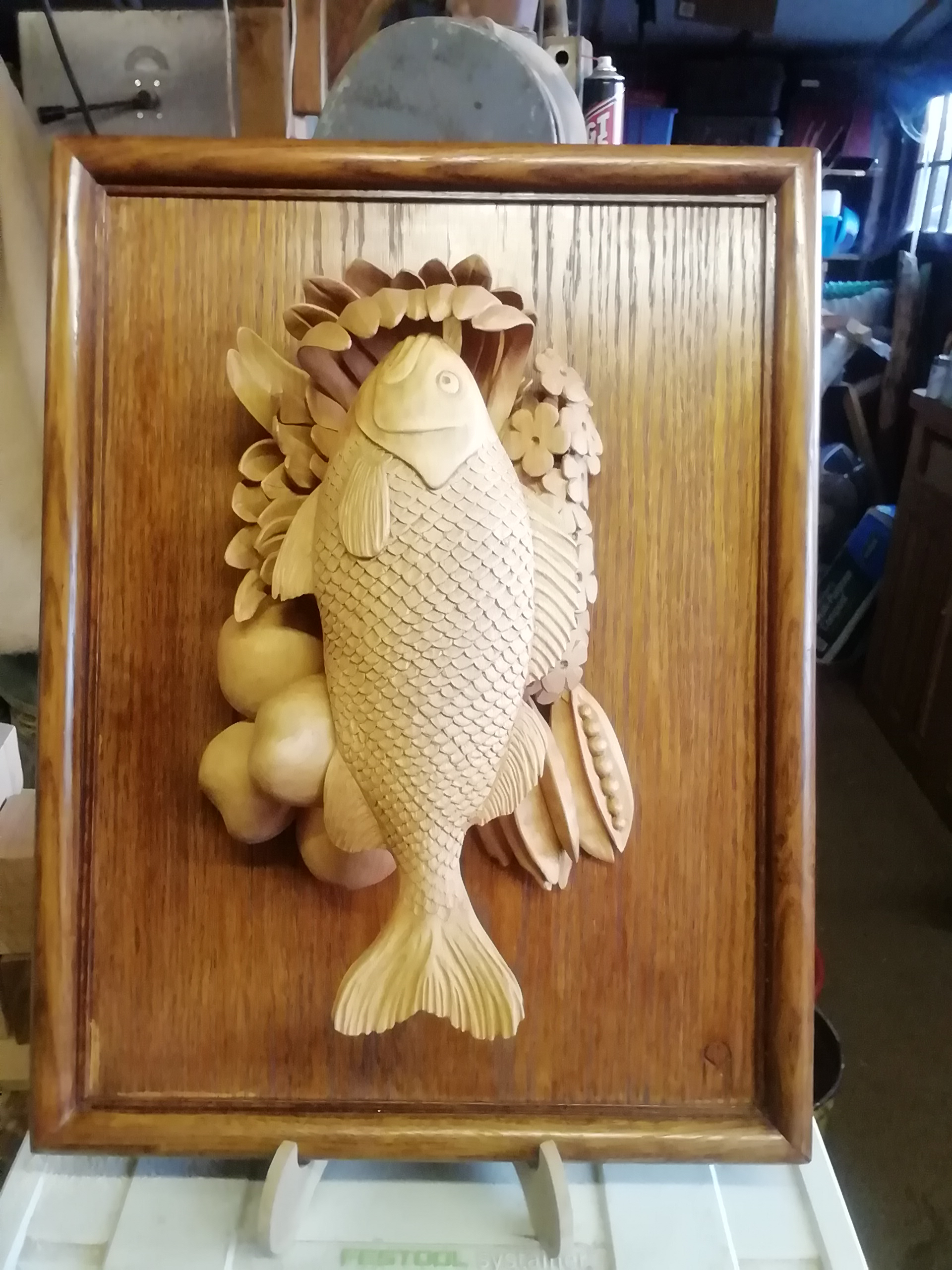
Final layer

== Legacy ==
Gibbons' association with Deptford is commemorated locally: Grinling Gibbons Primary School is in Clyde Street, near the site of Sayes Court in Deptford. Parts of New Cross and Deptford were in the "Grinling Gibbons" council ward from 1978 to 1998.

== List of works ==
- Statue of Charles II, Chelsea, London
- Memorial to William Windham, St Margaret's Church, Felbrigg, Norfolk
- Memorial to Sir Richard Head, 1st Baronet, Rochester Cathedral, Rochester
- Statue of King William III, College Green, Dublin

== Bibliography ==
- The Carved Cartoon: A Picture of the Past, Austin Clare 1873
- The Work of Grinling Gibbons, Geoffrey Beard, John Murray 1989 ISBN 0-7195-4728-8
- Grinling Gibbons and the Art of Carving, David Esterly, V&A Publications 2000 ISBN 1-85177-256-1
- The Lost Carving by David Esterly, 2012

Attribution

This article incorporates text from a publication now in the public domain: Seccombe, Thomas (1898). "Somerset, Henry". In Lee, Sidney (ed.). Dictionary of National Biography. Vol. 53. London: Smith, Elder & Co. pp. 242–245.
