= Tobias Rustat =

British courtier and investor

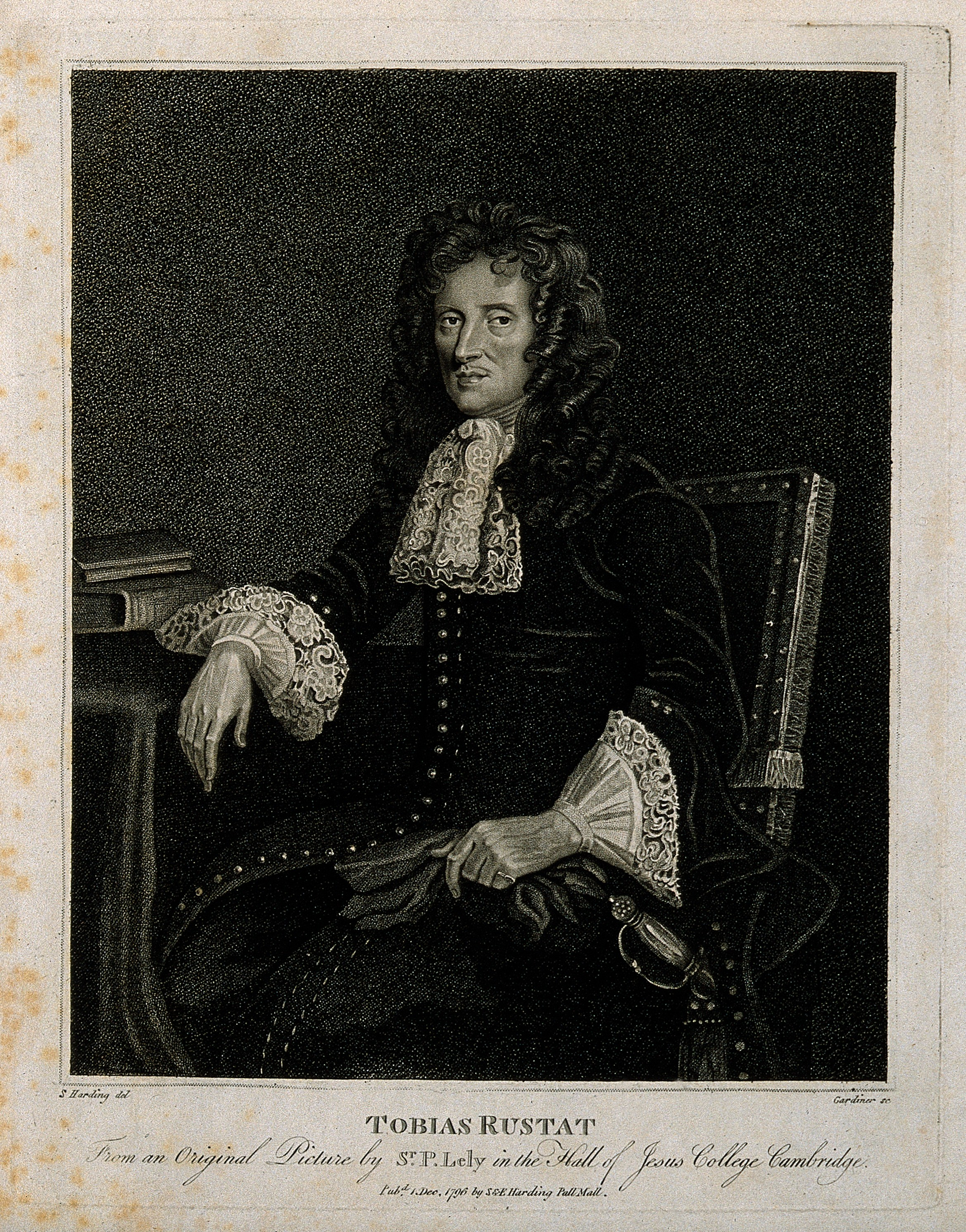
Rustat, a 1796 engraving by W. N. Gardiner (after Kneller, 1682)

Tobias Rustat (bapt. 17 September 1608 – 15 March 1694 N. S.) was a courtier to King Charles II and a benefactor of the University of Cambridge. He is remembered for creating the first fund for the purchase of books at the Cambridge University Library. He was an investor in, and Assistant of, the Royal African Company, an English mercantile company involved in the slave trade.

== Life ==
Rustat was born at Barrow upon Soar, Leicestershire, where his father Robert was vicar. His mother Alice was a sister of Robert Snoden, bishop of Carlisle, 1616–1621. He was baptised at Barrow on 17 September 1608.

After an apprenticeship to a barber-surgeon in London, Rustat entered the service of Basil Feilding, 2nd Earl of Denbigh and attended him in his embassy to Venice, before becoming a servant to his nephew George Villiers, 2nd Duke of Buckingham. An ardent Royalist, he acted as a courier between England and the exiled court. During the Second English Civil War, Rustat joined Buckingham in a 1648 uprising in Kent, where he saved the Duke's life. In 1648 he escaped to the continent with Buckingham. He was present following the Battle of Worcester (1651) and aided the escape of Charles II.

In 1650 Rustat was made Yeoman of the Robes to Charles II, remaining in the position until the king's death in 1685. Rustat's personal wealth came from his career as a courtier and his loyalty to the king. He became an investor, alongside the king and his brother the Duke of York, in a series of trading companies including the Royal African Company and the Gambia Adventurers. Rustat played a role in running the Royal African Company, being elected for three one-year terms as an Assistant (equivalent of a company director) in 1676, 1679 and 1680. The Members of the Court of Assistants can be considered equivalent to a modern-day board of directors. Historian William Pettigrew has stated that this company “shipped more enslaved African women, men and children to the Americas than any other single institution during the entire period of the transatlantic slave trade” and that investors in the company were fully aware of its activities and intended to profit from this exploitation.

In 1675, the University of Cambridge awarded Rustat a Master of Arts degree per literas regias.

John Evelyn wrote of Rustat "He is a very simple, ignorant, but honest and loyal creature."

Rustat is buried in the chapel of Jesus College, Cambridge where there is a monument to him by the studio of Grinling Gibbons. This bears an inscription to Rustat's belief that giving away as much as one is able in life can bring one closer to God in death, and records that he died at the age of 87 on 15 March 1693 (Old Style).

== Benefactions and legacy ==
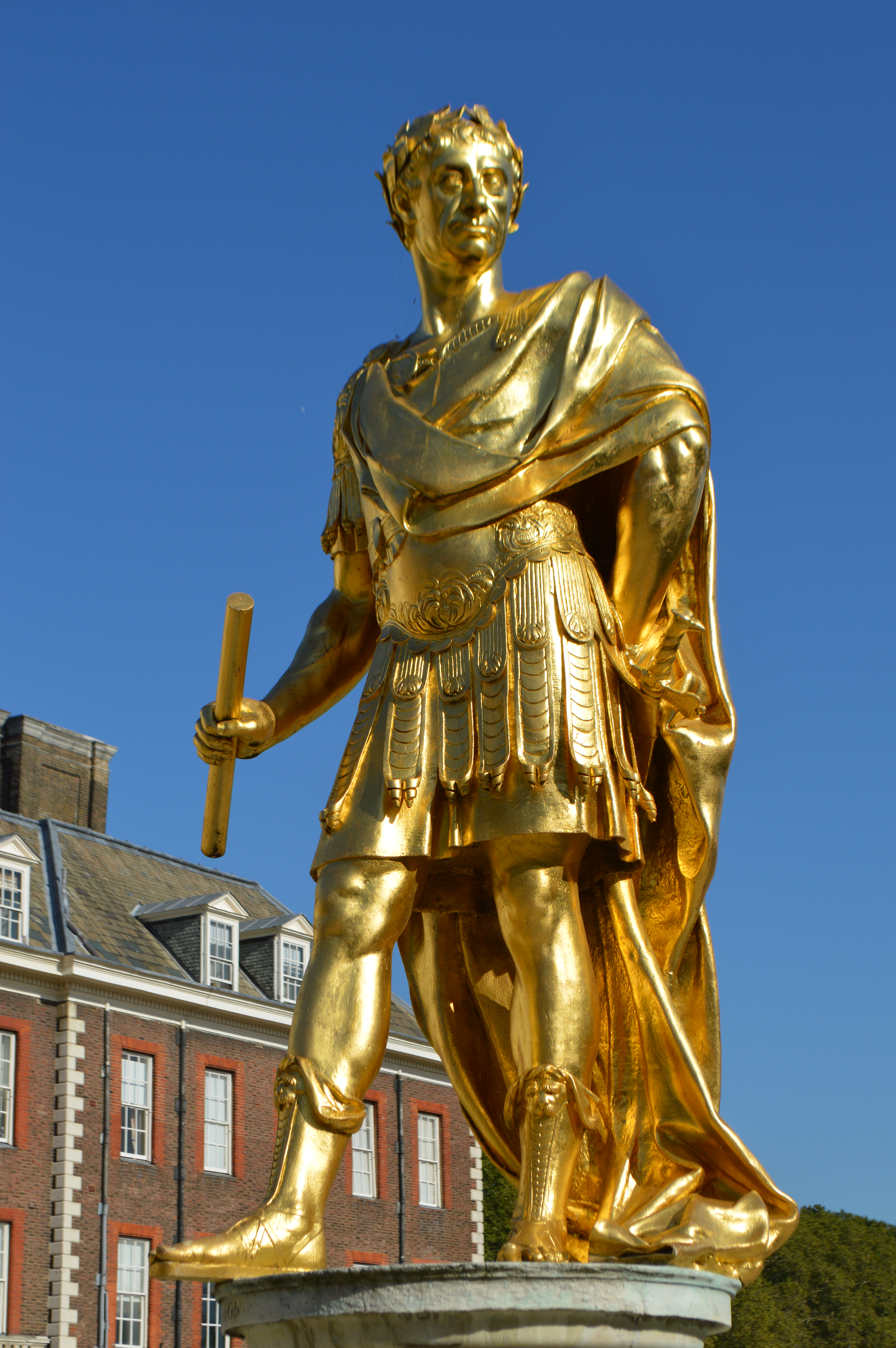
Statue of Charles II, Royal Hospital Chelsea, commissioned around 1680–1682

In later life Rustat became an important benefactor to a number of colleges of the University of Cambridge, in particular to Jesus College where his father had been a student. In January 1667 he created the first fund for the purchase of books at the Cambridge University Library with a donation of £1,000. The books purchased from the fund were to be bound in the same way with Rustat's arms stamped in gold on the cover, kept in one place in the library, and recorded in a vellum book.

Rustat created a scholarship at Jesus College for the orphan sons of Anglican clergymen. Among the Rustat scholars were poet Samuel Taylor Coleridge and clergyman Henry Venn. The Tobias Rustat's Charity supports vicars in Leicestershire.

Rustat commissioned three statues of Stuart kings from the workshop of Grinling Gibbons in the 1670s and '80s. These were the standing statue of Charles II at the Royal Hospital Chelsea, an equestrian statue of Charles II in Windsor Castle and the statue of James II, now in Trafalgar Square. The last was commissioned for the Palace of Whitehall, apparently at the same time as the standing Charles II, and the two works might have been intended as pendant pieces.

Jesus College, Cambridge owns a 1682 portrait of Rustat painted by Godfrey Kneller (previously attributed to Lely). This used to hang in the senior combination room but has been placed in storage. The college commemorated him in the naming of Rustat Road in Cambridge. The Rustat Conferences, founded in 2009, were named after him; in 2020 they were renamed the Jesus College Conferences.

Rustat is commemorated by a small, late 19th-century stone statue at the Old Schools, the original site of the University Library.

== Rustat monument ==
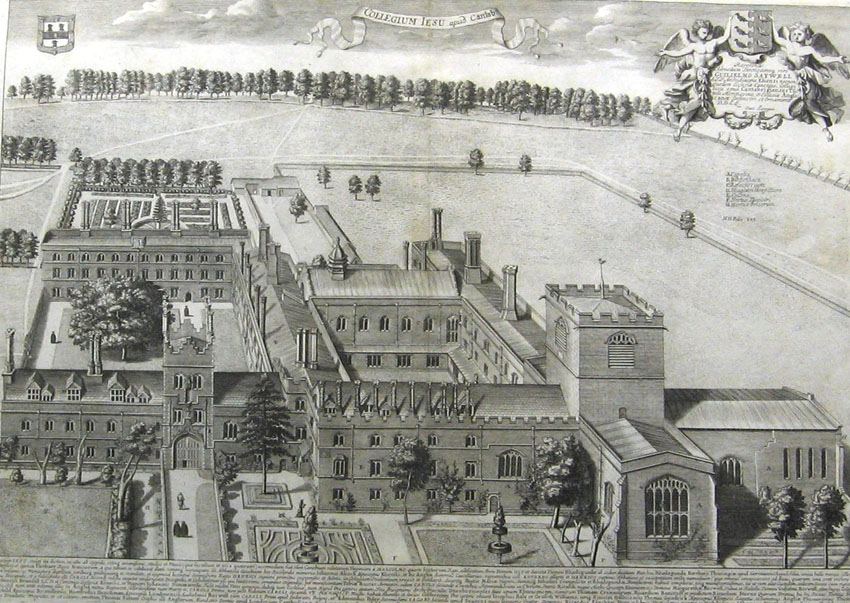
Jesus College, Cambridge by David Loggan (1690)

A white marble memorial monument to Rustat in the chapel of Jesus College is attributed to the studio of Grinling Gibbons, with parts carved by Arnold Quellin and others less certainly by John Nost. The college proposed that this memorial should be removed from the chapel, and a faculty application to permit this was made to the Diocese of Ely in December 2020.

The removal of the monument from the west wall of the college chapel was opposed by Rustat’s descendants and some alumni. An objection by 65 alumni, calling themselves the Rustat memorial group, stated that the character of the chapel would be altered, that the college was trying to alter that character, and that its arguments opposed the whole idea of heritage. The objectors stated that Rustat's involvement with the slave trade was marginal in his life and not unusual in the culture of his time. Evidence had been filed with the University of Cambridge Advisory Group on Legacies of Enslavement which attempted to exonerate Rustat from any significant links to the 17th-century slave trade, as his RAC holdings constituted only 1.7 per cent of his total worth measured by his lifetime giving and his estate at death. English Heritage opposed the proposed relocation while the Archbishop of Canterbury Justin Welby criticised the delay in removing what he described as "a memorial to slavery" on 8 February 2022.

The faculty application to move the Rustat memorial was considered at a three-day consistory court hearing in February 2022. David Hodge QC, Deputy Chancellor of the Diocese of Ely, ruled that removing the memorial would case significant harm to the chapel as a building of special historical and architectural interest. His judgement concluded that Jesus College had not presented a clear and compelling case for removal that outweighed this harm. After the ruling the Archbishop of Canterbury stood by his comments and stated "Memorials to slave-traders do not belong in places of worship."

Jesus College spent £120,000 pursuing its application to remove the Rustat memorial from its chapel. The college decided against an appeal. Costs were not awarded to the opposing party.

== Rustat scholars ==
- Nathaniel Spinckes (1653–1727), nonjuring clergyman
- David Hartley (1705 –1757), philosopher
- Henry Venn (1725–1797), clergyman
- Samuel Taylor Coleridge (1772–1834), poet
- Herbert White (1830–1863), cricketer and clergyman
- Martin Charlesworth (1895–1950), classicist
- Jack Longland (1905–1993), educator, climber and broadcaster.

== See also ==
- Okukor, a Benin bronze at Jesus College until 2021
