= Al White (disambiguation) =

Al White is an American character actor.

Al White may also refer to:

- Al White (politician) (born 1950), Republican member of the Colorado Senate
- Albert White (diver) (1895–1982), American Olympic diver
- Alvin S. White (1918–2006), American test pilot and USAF astronaut

== See also ==
- Alan White (disambiguation)
- Albert White (disambiguation)
- Alex White (disambiguation)
- Alexander White (disambiguation)
- Alfred White (disambiguation)
