= Tunstead, Norfolk =

Village in Norfolk, England

Coordinates: 52.74718°N 1.40149°E

Tunstead
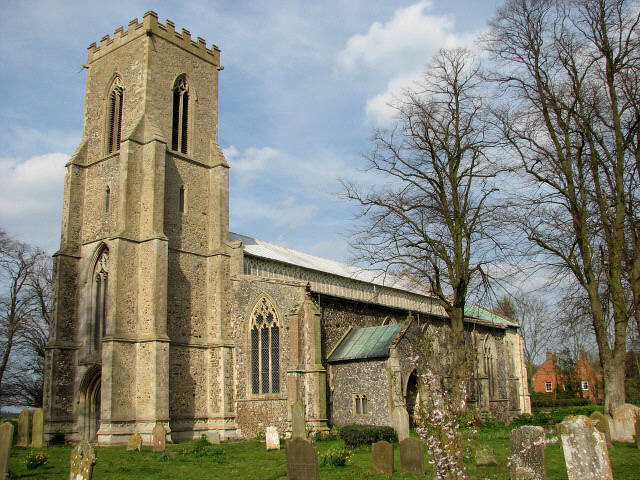
- Saint Mary's parish church, Tunstead, Norfolk

- Location within Norfolk
- Area: 11.32 km^{2} (4.37 sq mi)
- Population: 744 (parish, 2011 census)
  - Density: 66/km^{2} (170/sq mi)
- OS grid reference: TG290210
  - London: 129 miles (208 km)
- Civil parish: Tunstead CP
- District: North Norfolk
- Shire county: Norfolk
- Region: East
- Country: England
- Sovereign state: United Kingdom
- Post town: NORWICH
- Postcode district: NR12
- Dialling code: 01692; 01603
- Police: Norfolk
- Fire: Norfolk
- Ambulance: East of England

Tunstead is a village and a civil parish in the English county of Norfolk. The village is 10.7 miles north-north-east of the city of Norwich, 15 miles south-south-east of Cromer and 129 miles north-east of London. Tunstead is 2.5 miles north of the settlements of Wroxham and Hoveton.

The village's name means "Farmstead". "Hundred Hill" on Bradfield Common may mark the boundary with North Erpingham hundred rather than the meeting-place of the Tunstead hundred.

The nearest railway station is at Hoveton and Wroxham for the Bittern Line which runs between Sheringham, Cromer and Norwich. The nearest airport is Norwich International Airport.

For the purposes of local government, the parish falls within the district of North Norfolk. At the time of the 2001 census, the parish had a population of 674, increasing to 744 at the 2011 census.

The parish church of St Mary has a notable rood screen with ogee arches. The church has some unusual features, i.e. flushwork arcading instead of a clerestory and a raised platform behind the high alter.

== Gallery ==
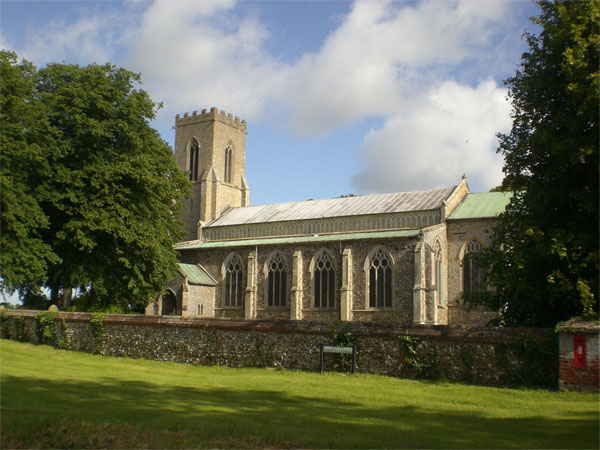
St Mary's Parish Church, Norfolk, England

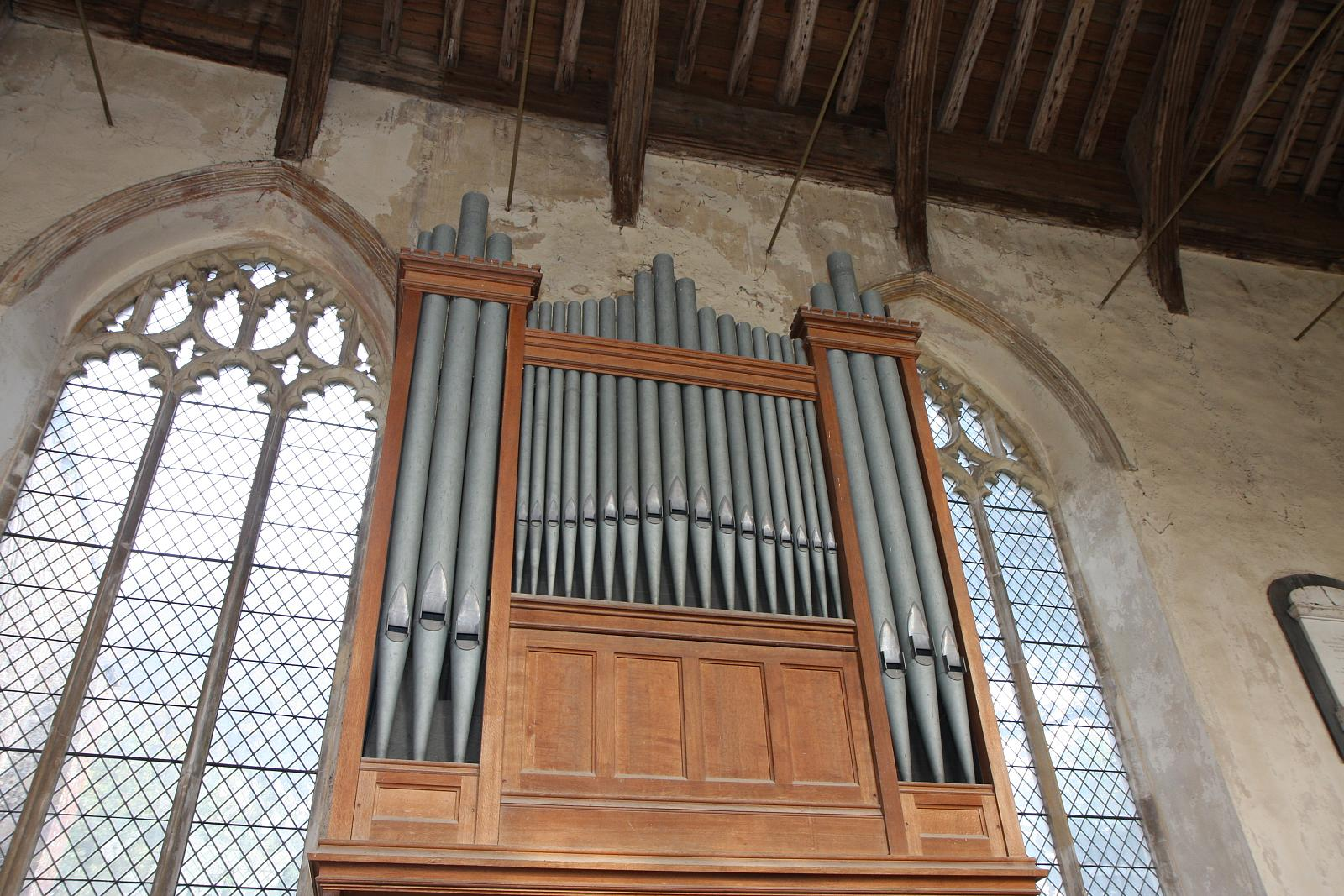
The church's organ

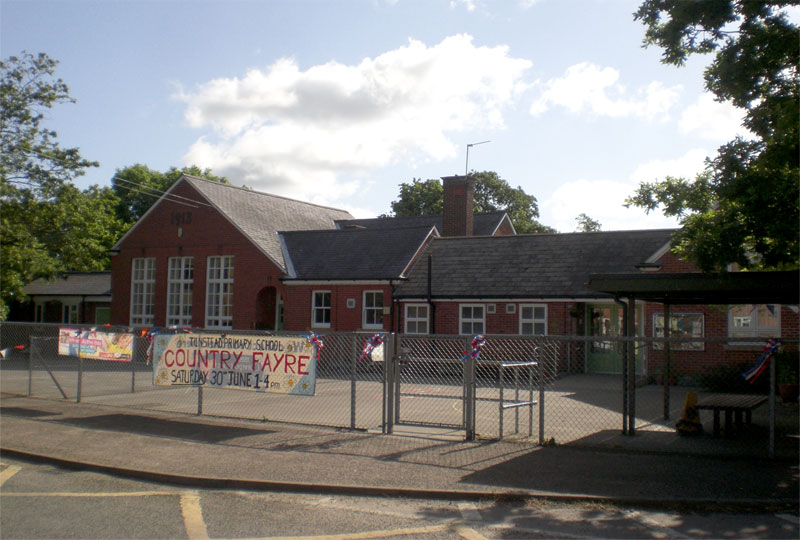
Tunstead Primary School, Norfolk

== See also ==
Tunstead & Sco-Ruston village website
