= Allan White (footballer) =

Australian rules footballer, born 1915

Personal information
- Full name: Allan White
- Born: 21 July 1915
- Died: 4 August 1987 (aged 72)
- Original team: Brunswick Juniors
- Height: 179 cm (5 ft 10 in)
- Weight: 77 kg (170 lb)

Playing career^{1}
Years	Club	Games (Goals)
1936–1939, 1943	Fitzroy	31 (268)
- ^{1} Playing statistics correct to the end of 1943.

Allan White (21 July 1915 – 4 August 1987) was an Australian rules footballer who played for the Fitzroy Football Club in the Victorian Football League (VFL).
