= Alexander White (designer) =

Footwear Designer

- Born: United Kingdom
- Education: University of Edinburgh; London College of Fashion
- Label: Alexander White

Alexander White (born June 1988) is a British shoe designer who launched his eponymous footwear line in September 2014. His collections are distributed internationally, including such retailers as Barneys New York, Lane Crawford and Level Shoe District.

== Early life ==
He attended The King's School, an independent school in Chester before going to study Design and Applied Arts at the University of Edinburgh. He later studied Footwear Design at Cordwainers' College at London College of Fashion.

Before starting his own label, White gained industry experience at Giles Deacon, Erdem and Kurt Geiger. Whilst working for Kurt Geiger he set out to launch his brand after a chance encounter with the Creative Director of Jimmy Choo at Heathrow airport.

In 2015, he was one of the finalists in Vogue Italia’s WHO IS ON NEXT? Competition. In 2017, Alexander White was named Footwear Designer of the Year at the Draper's Footwear Awards. Later that same year, he presented his first collection at London Fashion Week.

Alexander White is a member of the British Fashion Council.
