= Albert White (musician) =

American musician (born 1942)

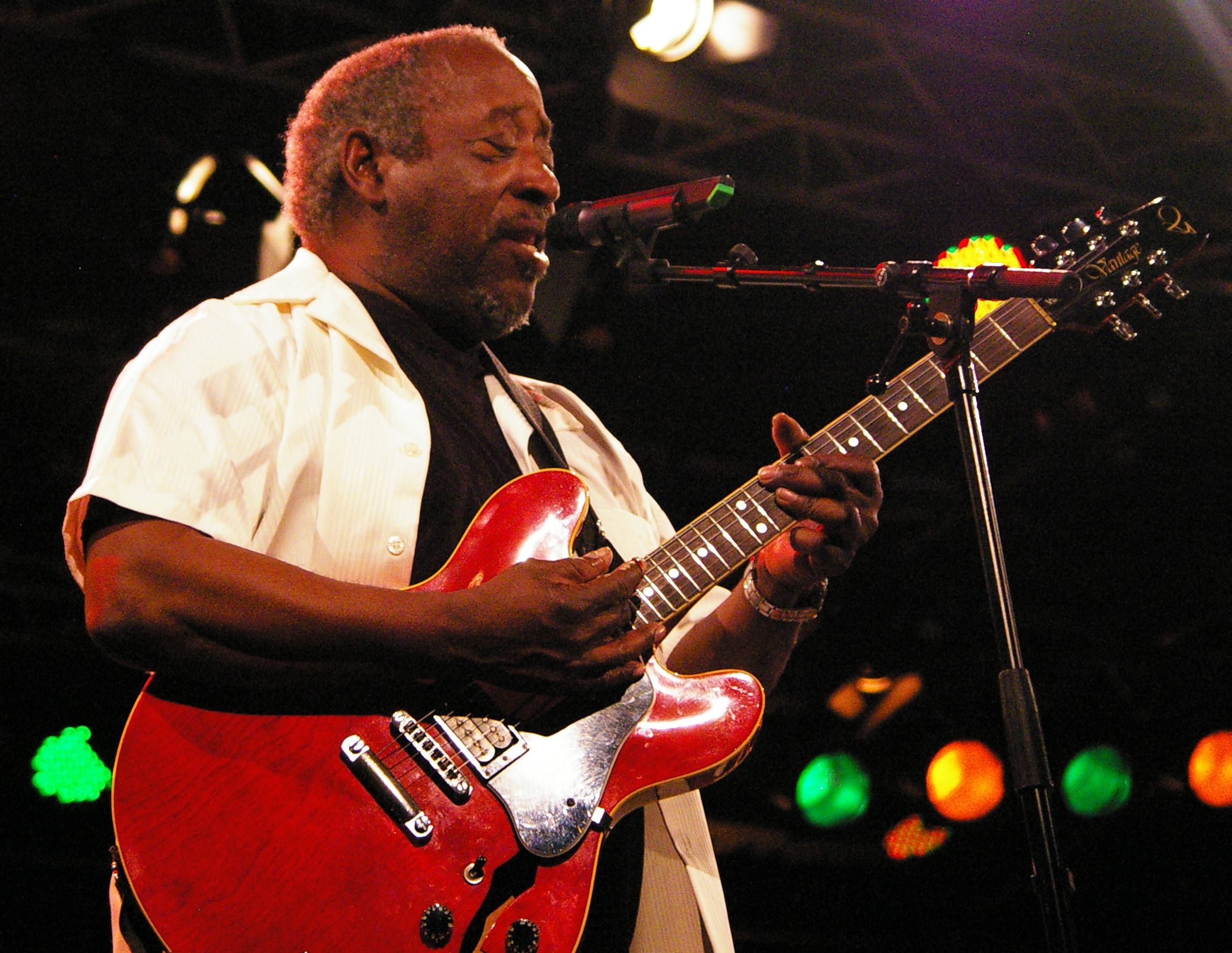

Background information
- Born: December 1, 1942 (age 83); Atlanta, Georgia, United States
- Genre: Electric blues
- Occupations: Guitarist, singer, songwriter
- Instrument: Guitar
- Years active: Late 1950s–present

Albert White (born December 1, 1942) is an American blues guitarist, singer and songwriter. He has released two albums in his own name, although his musical career started in the late 1950s, when he played in Piano Red's then ensemble, later known as Dr. Feelgood & the Interns.

White has variously performed with the Tams, Joe Tex, Ray Charles, Beverly Watkins, Clarence Carter, Ben E. King, Hank Ballard and The Midnighters, and Rufus Thomas.

== Life and career ==
White was born in Atlanta, Georgia, United States. His was a musical family, having Piano Red as an uncle. He began learning to play the guitar from an early age with Piano Red noting that, by the age of nine, White was playing self-made chords on a ukulele. Red then sent White to learn further from his own guitarist, Wesley Jackson. White progressed to the stage that he joined Piano Red's band as guitarist in the late 1950s, becoming bandleader of Dr. Feelgood & the Interns in early 1962. One of the other band members was Beverly Watkins, who became a lifelong friend. When the band folded, White joined the Tams from the late 1960s to the early 1970s, and later in the decade played with Hank Ballard and The Midnighters.

White also had his own ensemble named the Rockers, who played in juke joints, nightclubs, and at various functions throughout the Southeastern United States. On that circuit, White played alongside Rufus Thomas, Ray Charles, Joe Tex, and Ben E. King amongst others. In addition, he recorded with Clarence Carter for Peacock Records. During the 1970s White and the Rockers were recorded at two concerts. One was at the New Palladium on Bankhead Highway, and the second at the Sportsman Oasis Ballroom. Both nights were captured by a low-fi cassette recorder placed on the stage. These remained in the vaults until they were remastered by Music Maker and finally released in September 2016, entitled Albert White and the Rockers.

By 2000, White joined the Music Maker family, benefiting from financial assistance, new equipment and help in recording his 2007 album, Soul of the Blues. Soul of the Blues was enhanced by guest appearances by Steve Cropper, Elvin Bishop and Beverly Watkins. Having retired from running his own business, White was free to promote his work. He has also subsequently toured across the United States, Europe, and Australia.

White's track "A Rose For My Lady" was on the compilation release, Blues Sweet Blues (2008). His track, "Stranded" appeared on the 2011 compilation album, The Music Maker Revue Live! in Europe, released by Dixiefrog.

In January 2016, White performed with the Music Maker Blues Revue during the 2016 GlobalFest at Webster Hall's studio stage, New York.

== Discography ==
=== Albums ===
Year	Title	Record label
2007	Soul of the Blues	Music Maker
2016	Albert White and the Rockers	Music Maker

== See also ==
- List of electric blues musicians
