= Bert White (Australian footballer) =

Australian rules footballer, born 1906

Personal information
- Full name: Bert White
- Born: 2 November 1906
- Died: 2 September 1988 (aged 81)
- Original team: Northcote Juniors
- Height: 165 cm (5 ft 5 in)
- Weight: 67 kg (148 lb)

Playing career^{1}
Years	Club	Games (Goals)
1927	Fitzroy	14 (8)
- ^{1} Playing statistics correct to the end of 1927.

Bert White (2 November 1906 – 2 September 1988) was an Australian rules footballer who played with Fitzroy in the Victorian Football League (VFL).

White played with Northcote in 1928, then with Longwood in 1929, then was cleared to St. Kilda in 1930.
