= Albert White (cricketer) =

English cricketer

Albert Winterton White (1889–1965) was an English cricketer active from 1914 to 1923 who played for Northamptonshire (Northants). He was born in Wellingborough on 10 January 1889 and died in Rushden on 9 March 1965. White appeared in eight first-class matches as a righthanded batsman. He scored 139 runs with a highest score of 29.
