= Alfred Holmes White =

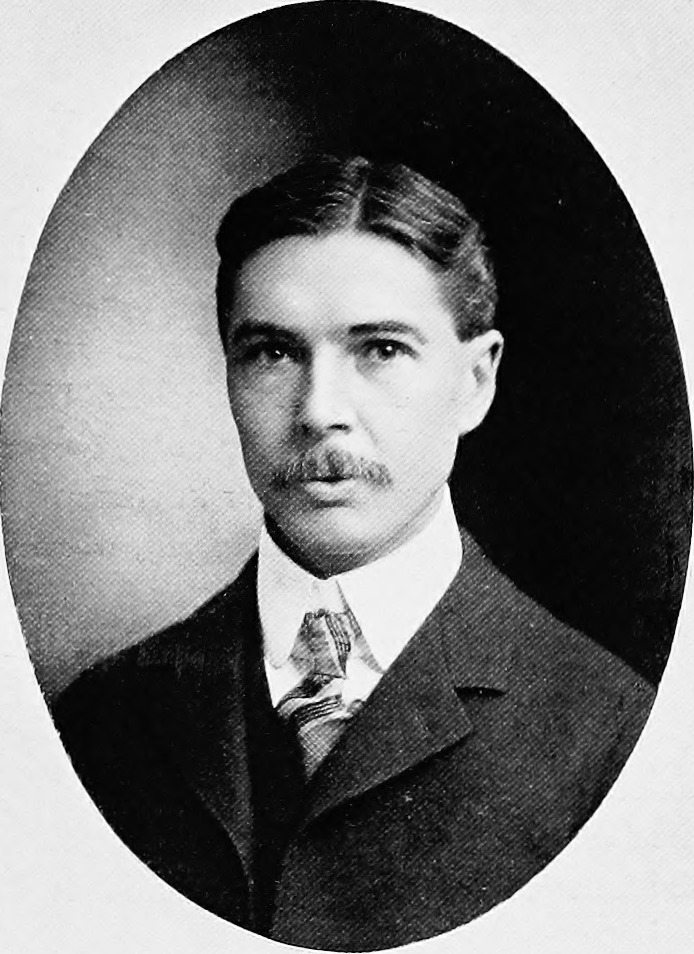
- Born: April 28, 1873; Peoria, Illinois
- Died: August 25, 1953 (aged 80)
- Citizenship: American
- Spouse: Rebecca Mason Downey
- Parent(s): Samuel Holmes White and Jennie McLaren
- Engineering career
- Discipline: Chemical engineering
- Employers: University of Illinois, University of Michigan

Alfred Holmes White (April 28, 1873 – August 25, 1953) was a chemical engineer at the University of Michigan.

== Biography ==
He was born in Peoria, Illinois to Samuel Holmes White and Jennie McLaren. He married Rebecca Mason Downey on July 28, 1903, and had two children.

He led the university's chemical engineering department to great heights of prestige, for over 40 years, beginning with its founding in 1898. His earliest academic job was at the University of Illinois, from 1893 to 1896, after which he joined the University of Michigan the next year, and rose to become a full professor by 1911. He was later made an emeritus professor.

His published works include The Disintegration of Cement Floors and Sidewalks and Studies in the Manufacture of Coal Gas, both in 1909.
