= Walter Bettesworth =

English cricketer

Personal information
- Full name: Walter Ambrose Bettesworth
- Born: 24 November 1856; Horndean, Hampshire, England
- Died: 23 February 1929 (aged 72); Hampstead, Middlesex, England
- Batting: Right-handed
- Bowling: Slow round-arm

Domestic team information
- Years: Team
- 1878 to 1883: Sussex

Career statistics
Competition	First-class
Matches	22
Runs scored	716
Batting average	17.90
100s/50s	0/4
Top score	77
Balls bowled	2192
Wickets	38
Bowling average	25.94
5 wickets in innings	2
10 wickets in match	0
Best bowling	5/66
Catches/stumpings	12/0
- Source: Cricinfo, 27 January 2021

Walter Ambrose Bettesworth (24 November 1856 – 23 February 1929) was an English cricketer and cricket writer.

Bettesworth was educated at Ardingly College in Sussex. A hard-hitting batsman, slow round-arm bowler and energetic field at cover point, he played 21 first-class matches for Sussex between 1878 and 1883. He also played once for Scotland in 1884 against the Philadelphians.

His highest first-class score was 77, the highest score on either side in the match, when Sussex defeated Hampshire in 1881. His best bowling figures were 5 for 66 in Sussex's loss to Yorkshire later that season, when he also made 32 and 59, Sussex's top score.

After finishing at Ardingly as a pupil, Bettesworth returned there to teach, then taught at Blair College in Scotland. Later he became a journalist and one of the best-known writers on the game. He was on the staff of the Cricket Field from 1892 to 1895, assistant editor of Cricket from 1896 to 1905, and cricket editor of The Field from 1906 to 1928. He wrote three books on the game: A Royal Road to Cricket, The Walkers of Southgate, and Chats on the Cricket Field.
